= M-29 (Michigan highway) =

State highway in Michigan, United States

M-29
- M-29 highlighted in red

Route information
- Maintained by MDOT
- Length: 41.634 mi (67.003 km)
- Existed: 1926–present

Major junctions
- South end: M-3 / I-94 in Chesterfield Township
- North end: BL I-94 in Marysville

Location
- Country: United States
- State: Michigan
- Counties: Macomb, St. Clair

Highway system
- Michigan State Trunkline Highway System; Interstate; US; State; Byways
← Bus. M-28	→ M-30

M-29 is a state trunkline highway in the US state of Michigan that runs in a south–north direction from Chesterfield Township to Marysville. It generally runs along the shore of Lake St. Clair and the St. Clair River.

The M-29 designation has been used twice in Michigan starting in 1919. The first designation near Lansing was replaced by U.S. Route 27 (US 27) in 1926. At that time, the M-29 designation was moved to the east side of the state along the current routing and farther north along part of what became US 25 and M-25. The 1933 extension of US 25 replaced the northern section of M-29 leading to the current location of M-29.

== Route description ==
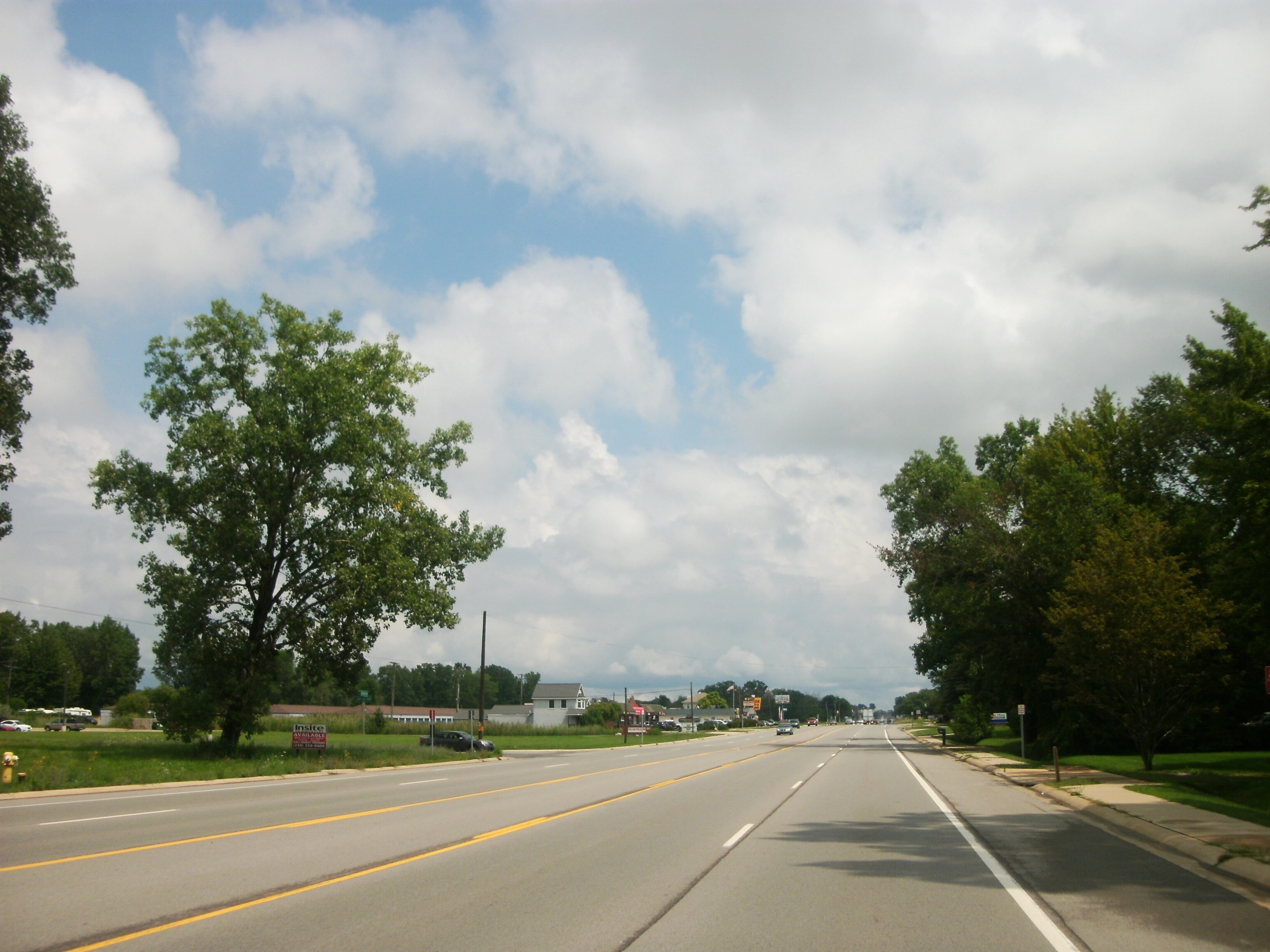
M-29 northbound in Chesterfield Township

The route generally follows the eastern border of the state along the northwest shore of Lake St. Clair and the western bank of the St. Clair River. From Algonac to its northern terminus in Marysville, M-29 is within a mile of Ontario, just across the river to the east. The route starts at an interchange with Interstate 94 (I-94) at exit 243. The road passes east through the residential areas of Chesterfield Township towards the shores of Lake St. Clair. Upon reaching the lake, the road turns to the northeast as it generally follows the contours of the lakeshore and St. Clair River further down. The road passes through New Baltimore and curves around the northern edge of Anchor Bay, which is part of Lake St. Clair. West of I-94, the route continues as 23 Mile Road.

From there the route swings to the south, following the eastern shore of the lake before turning back to the east as it approaches the Harsens Island Ferry docks. M-29 is the main thoroughfare with which to reach Harsens Island which connects to St. Clair Flats Wildlife Area and the communities of Grand Point, Maple Leaf and Sans Souci via M-154 by auto ferry. After passing by the ferry docks, the road turns back to the north, paralleling the St. Clair River as it runs along the eastern side of Algonac State Park, passing through numerous riverbank communities. The road then turns to the north and runs a few blocks inland as it enters Marine City. On the northern side of the town, the road turns back to the east, to once again, running adjacent the bank of the river.

The route continues along the shoreline, until it meanders back inland a bit as it passes by the St. Clair and Belle River power plants, after which it runs close to the bank, once again, buffered by several riverbank residences. As the route enters the city of St. Clair, it is known as River Road and Riverside Avenue as it serves as the main thoroughfare along the shore. As M-29 approaches Marysville the road turns back inland from the river where it travels through the southeastern side of Marysville before terminating at an intersection with I-94 Business Loop which leads into Port Huron.

== History ==
Prior to the implementation of the U.S. Highway System, M-29 existed as a route that connected the Lansing area to Indiana via Charlotte and Marshall. In 1926, when the U.S. Highway system was created, US 27 overtook the alignment that M-29 had previously occupied. At the same time the M-29 designation was shifted to the eastern side of the state, generally where it exists today. However, rather than terminating in Marysville, the route continued all the way around the thumb and into Bay City on a route now occupied by present-day M-25.

In 1933, the US 25 designation was extended from Port Huron, along the existing M-29 roadway, to a terminus in Port Austin. This would have created two discontinuous segments of M-29, so the section designated as such from Bay City to Port Austin was renumbered to M-25. In 1939, M-29, which formerly terminated at US 25 and Gratiot Avenue was shifted slightly eastward and realigned to run along Jefferson Avenue along the Lake St. Clair shoreline. It continued along Jefferson Avenue down to Grosse Pointe Shores where it then turned west along Vernier Road where it then terminated at US 25 on the Detroit – East Detroit border.

In 1949, the route was altered once again when a new bypass was built in Mount Clemens. From New Baltimore, the road continued along 23 Mile Road, as it had before, to US 25 and proceeded to the southwest to Hall Road where it assumed the new bypass alignment and continued to Crocker Boulevard where it turned southeasterly along its former alignment. Later in 1956, the Michigan State Highway Department made a few realignments in the Marine City as the route was moved to its present-day course.

In 1963, a section of I-94 freeway opened from south of Mount Clemens to Marysville. M-29 south of 23 Mile Road was routed onto it down to present day exit 235. Three years later, a realignment in Marysville, realigned M-29 onto the Busha Highway, returning the old route to local control. Finally, in 1971, M-29 south of exit 243 on I-94 was truncated back to its present-day terminus, and the route has existed as such since then.

== Major intersections ==
County	Location	mi	km	Destinations	Notes
Macomb	Chesterfield Township	0.000	0.000	I-94 – Detroit, Port Huron M-3 south (Gratiot Avenue)	Exit 243 on I-94; roadway continues south as M-3
St. Clair	Clay Township	16.525	26.594	Ferry Dock Road	Ferry to Harsens Island for M-154
St. Clair	Marysville	41.634	67.003	BL I-94	
1.000 mi = 1.609 km; 1.000 km = 0.621 mi
