= Clay Township, Michigan =

- Civil township
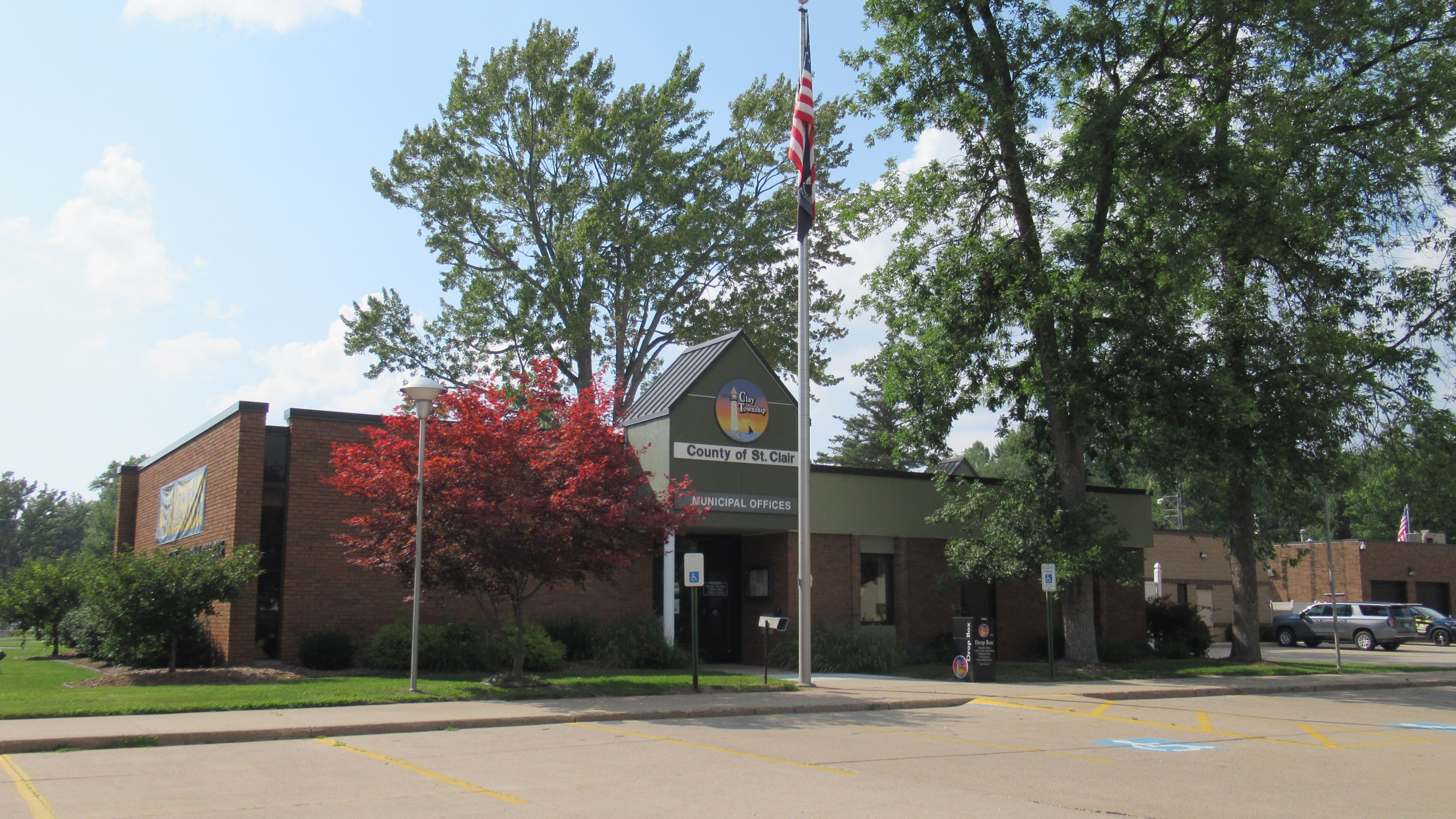
- Clay Township Municipal Offices

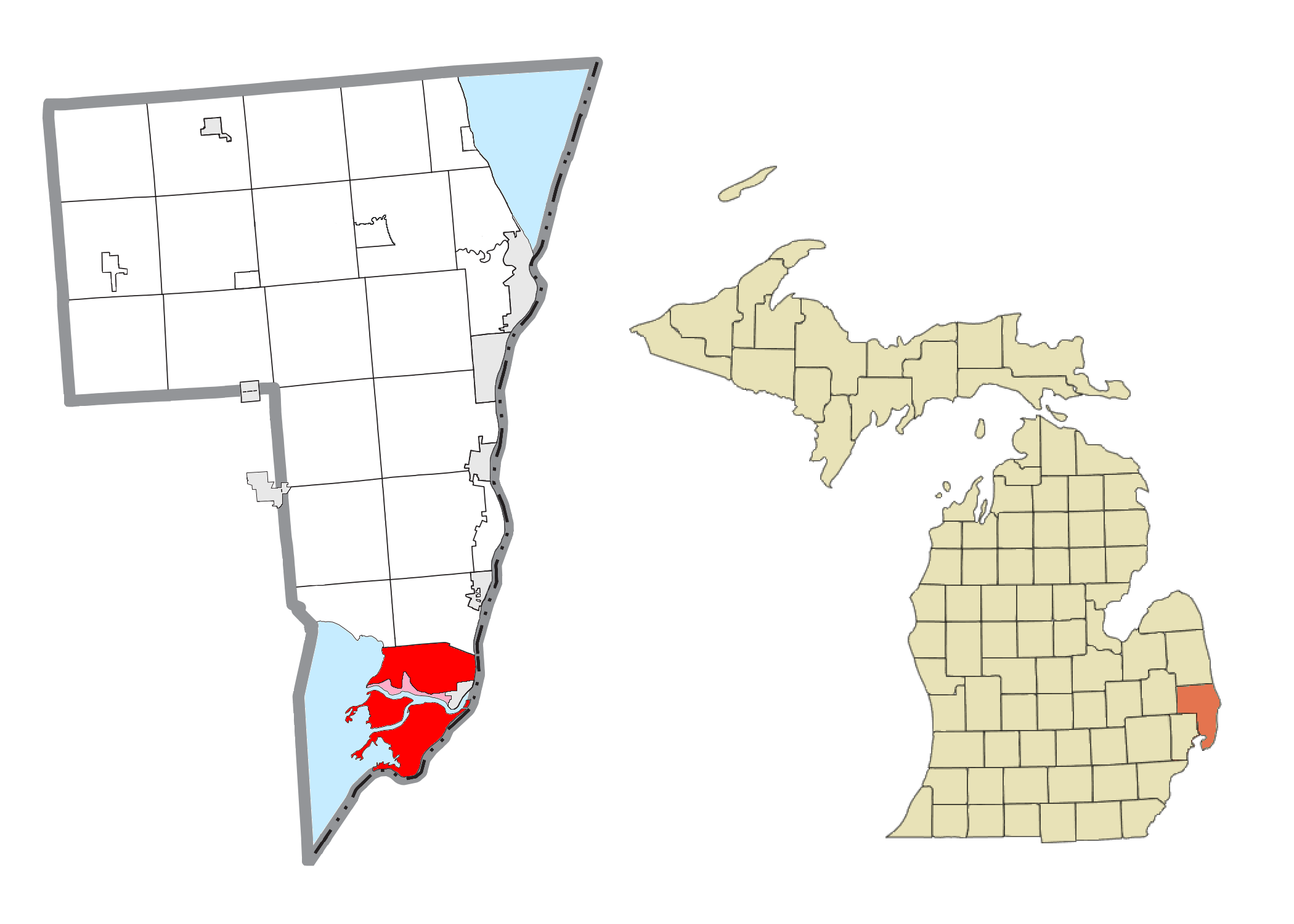
- Location within St. Clair County (red) and the administered CDP of Pearl Beach (pink)

- Location within the state of Michigan Location within the United States
- Coordinates: 42°36′38″N 82°35′31″W
- Country: United States
- State: Michigan
- County: St. Clair
- Settled: 1805
- Established: 1826 (Plainfield Township); 1828 (Clay Township)

Government
  - Supervisor: Paul Cassidy
  - Clerk: Tanya Hogan

Area
  - Total: 82.47 sq mi (213.60 km^{2})
  - Land: 35.32 sq mi (91.48 km^{2})
  - Water: 47.15 sq mi (122.12 km^{2})
- Elevation: 577 ft (176 m)

Population (2020)
  - Total: 8,446
  - Density: 102.4/sq mi (39.5/km^{2})
- Time zone: UTC-5 (Eastern (EST))
  - Summer (DST): UTC-4 (EDT)
- ZIP code(s): 48001 (Algonac); 48028 (Harsens Island)
- Area code: 810
- FIPS code: 26-16180
- GNIS feature ID: 1626090
- Website: Official website

Clay Township is a civil township of St. Clair County in the U.S. state of Michigan. The population was 8,446 at the 2020 census.

The township is located along the mouth of the St. Clair River at Lake St. Clair. The river delta includes numerous islands, in which Harsens Island is the largest. The township mostly surrounds the city of Algonac, but the two are administered autonomously since Algonac incorporated as a city in 1967. Most of Algonac State Park is located within Clay Township.

== Communities ==
- Bedore is an unincorporated community located along the southern coast of Harsens Island at 42°33′28″N 82°36′47″W.
- Clays Landing is an unincorporated community located at the southern terminus of M-154 on Harsens Island at 42°33′06″N 82°36′16″W.
- Forster is an unincorporated community located just west of Bedore at 42°33′40″N 82°37′06″W.
- Grand Pointe is an unincorporated community located in the northeastern area of Harsens Island at 42°35′58″N 82°32′43″W. The affluent community was settled as early as 1888 by the Grand Pointe Improvement Company, and a post office operated briefly from October 16, 1889 until January 5, 1892.
- Harsens Island is the name of the post office that serves the island and several surrounding islands. Harsens Island was first settled as early as 1779 by James Harsen, who was the area's first white settler. By 1783, Harsen had purchased the entire island from its native Indian population. As late as 1809, the island was also known as James (also Jacob or Jacobus) Island. The post office began operating under the name Sans Souci on April 24, 1900 and was renamed Harsens Island on December 31, 1960. The post office uses the 48028 ZIP Code.
- Maple Leaf is an unincorporated community located on Harsens Island just southwest of the community of Sans Souci at 42°34′41″N 82°34′11″W.
- Miller is an unincorporated community located near the southernmost end of Harsens Island at the end of public road access at 42°32′57″N 82°39′32″W.
- Muirs is an unincorporated community located along M-154 on Harsens Island at 42°33′23″N 82°35′14″W.
- Pearl Beach is an unincorporated community and census-designated place (CDP) located along the southern end of the mainland at 42°37′36″N 82°35′52″W.
- Perch Point is an unincorporated community located along M-29 in the northwestern portion of the township along the border with Ira Township at 42°39′54″N 82°37′13″W.
- Pointe aux Tremble is an unincorporated community located along M-29 within the Pearl Beach CDP at 42°37′17″N 82°34′16″W. The community was settled in 1904 as a station along the railway about 3.0 miles (4.8 km) west of Algonac.
- Riverside is an unincorporated community located in the southern portion of Harsens Island at 42°33′32″N 82°37′49″W.
- Roberts Landing is an unincorporated community located along M-29 near Algonac State Park along the border with Cottrellville Township at 42°39′35″N 82°30′57″W. The community was named after its first settler, who arrived here in 1830. The Roberts family settled the area as a popular fishing and hunting destination. A post office operated here from April 29, 1869 until December 15, 1895.
- Sans Souci is an unincorporated community located on Harsens Island at 42°34′52″N 82°33′44″W.

== History ==
The area was first settled by John Martin in 1805, and the area was originally referred to as Pointe du Chene (Oak Point). In 1826, the area was organized as Plainfield Township, which was named by early settler John K. Smith after his hometown of Plainfield, Vermont. A post office named Plainfield began operating here on April 5, 1826 with Smith serving as the first postmaster. In 1828, the township was reorganized and renamed after attorney and statesman Henry Clay, and the post office was later renamed Clay on December 23, 1835; Smith continued serving as postmaster. The post office was renamed Algonac on August 17, 1843. Algonac incorporated as a village within Clay Township in 1867. The village gained autonomy from the township when it incorporated as a city in 1967.

=== Historic sites ===
- Colony Tower Complex
- Harsen House
- LeRoy Smith House
- North Channel Shooting Club
- St. Clair River Informational Designation
- Stewart Farm / Memoir of Aura Stewart
- St. Clair Flats Front and Rear Range Light

== Geography ==
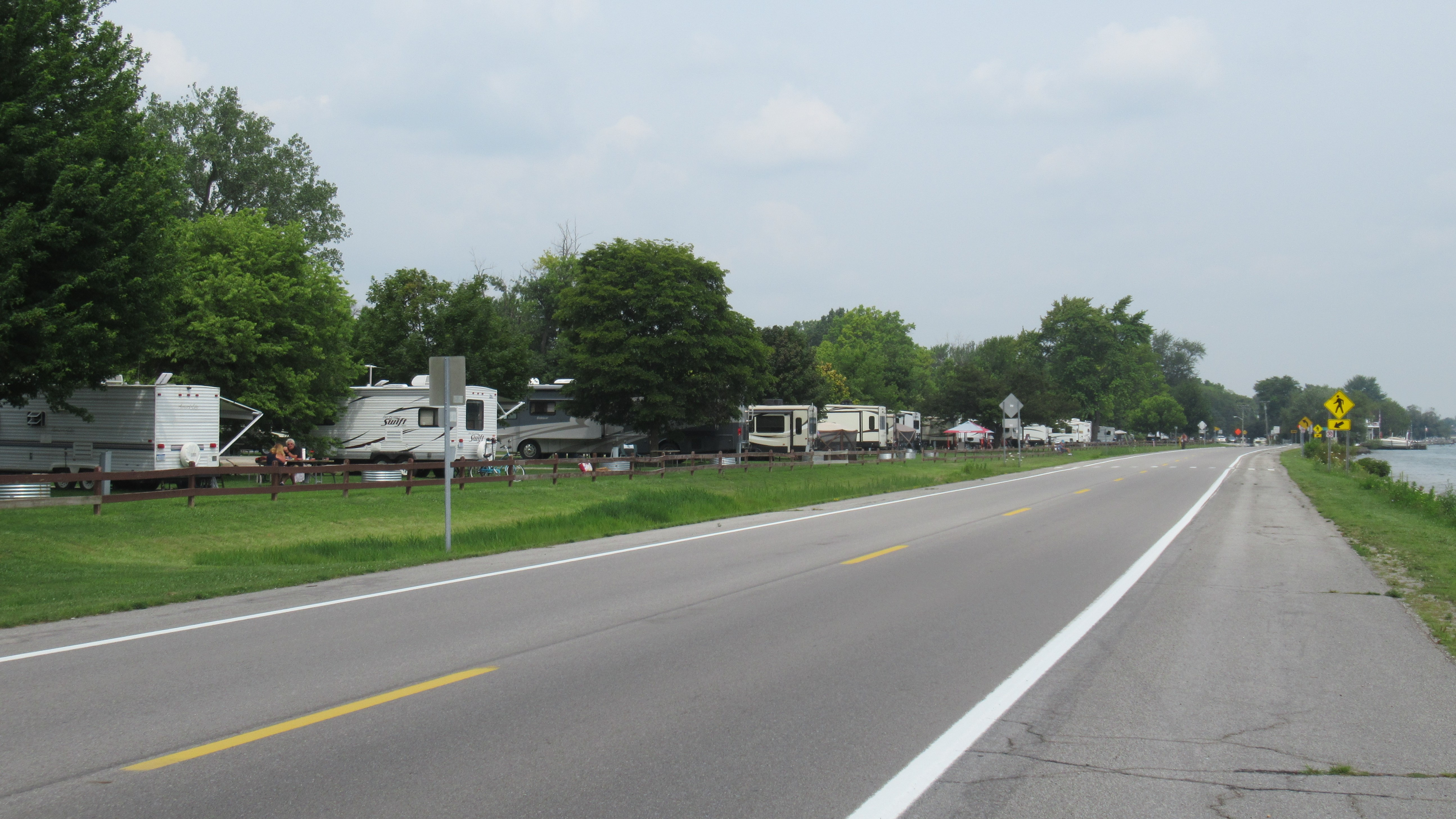
Looking north on M-29 along the St. Clair River at Algonac State Park

According to the U.S. Census Bureau, the township has a total area of 82.47 square miles (213.60 km^{2}), of which 35.32 square miles (91.48 km^{2}) is land and 47.15 square miles (122.12 km^{2}) (57.17%) is water.

The township contains a large portion of water that includes areas along the St. Clair River mouth in the northern Anchor Bay area of Lake St. Clair, which contains numerous channels and canals. Directly across the river is the Walpole Island First Nation in Ontario, which is accessible via the Walpole–Algonac Ferry in downtown Algonac.

The St. Clair Flats State Wildlife Area and the majority of the St. John's Marsh State Wildlife Area are located within Clay Township. Most of Algonac State Park is located within Clay Township with a small portion extending north into Cottrellville Township.

=== Islands ===
- Bruckner Island
- Club Island
- Dickinson Island
- Green Island
- Gull Island
- Harsens Island
- McDonald Island
- Middle Island
- Muscamoot Ridge
- North Island
- Russell Island
- Sand Island
- Strawberry Island

== Transportation ==
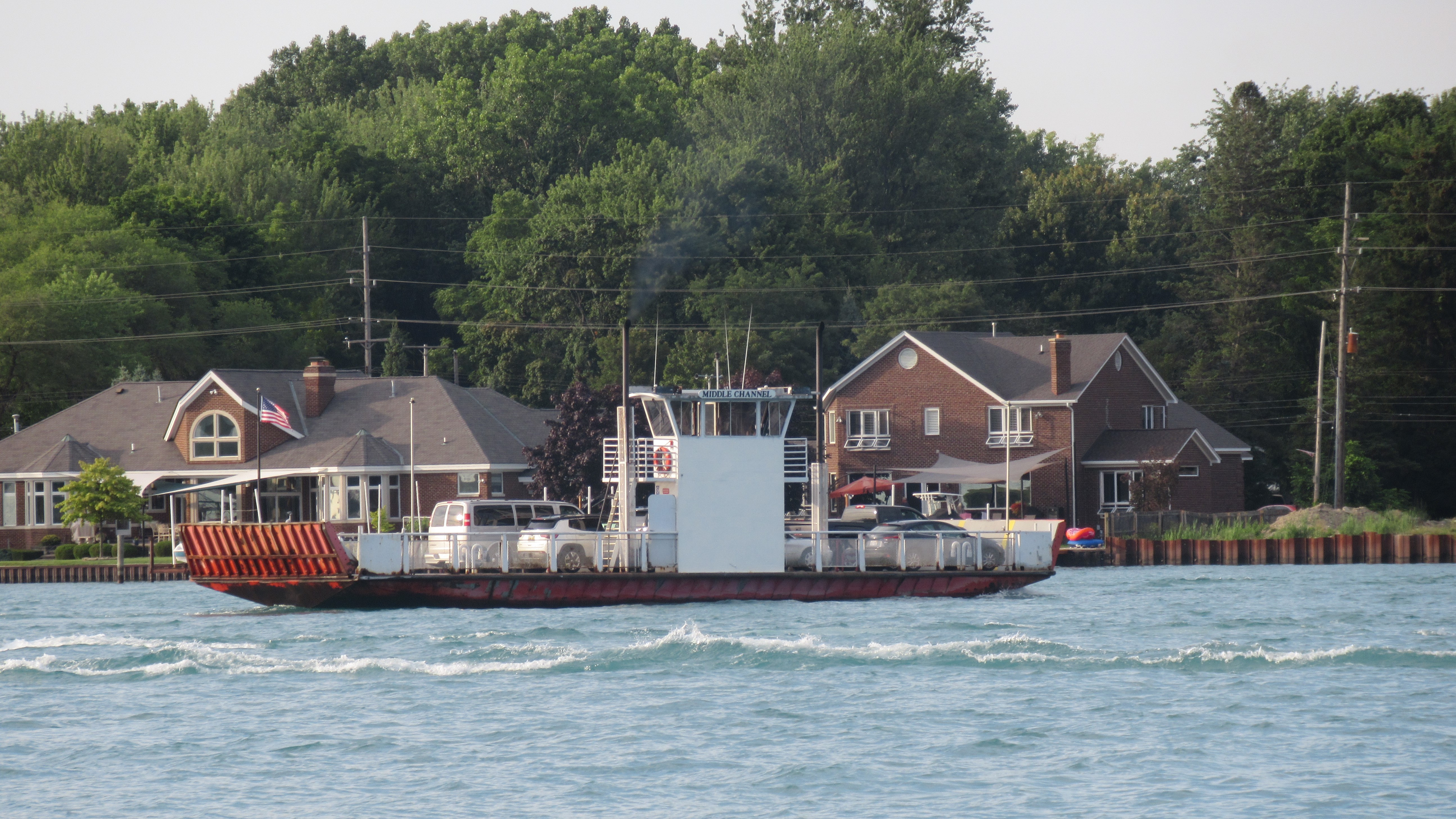
Ferry service to and from Harsens Island

=== Airport ===
- Harsens Island Airport (FAA: Z92) is a general aviation public airport located on Harsens Island. The airport began operating in 1994 and contains a single grass runway.

=== Ferries ===
- Champion's Auto Ferry is a commercial ferry service that provides passenger and automobile transportation from the mainland to Harsens Island.
- Russell Island Ferry transports only passengers to Russell Island, which does not allow automobile traffic. The mainland ferry terminal is located in the city of Algonac. The service consists of a single ferry, the Pride of Lake Huron, which was built in 1948.

=== Major highways ===
- M-29 curves through the township along the coastline of the North Channel and St. Clair River.
- M-154 is a located entirely on Harsens Island and is accessible via ferry service from M-29.
- U.S. Bicycle Route 20 runs through portions of the township and also runs conterminous at some points with the Bridge to Bay Trail.

== Demographics ==
As of the census of 2000, there were 9,822 people, 3,934 households, and 2,844 families residing in the township. The population density was 277.0 inhabitants per square mile (107.0/km^{2}). There were 5,325 housing units at an average density of 150.2 per square mile (58.0/km^{2}). The racial makeup of the township was 97.92% White, 0.20% African American, 0.68% Native American, 0.11% Asian, 0.21% from other races, and 0.87% from two or more races. Hispanic or Latino of any race were 0.85% of the population.

There were 3,934 households, out of which 27.9% had children under the age of 18 living with them, 61.3% were married couples living together, 7.0% had a female householder with no husband present, and 27.7% were non-families. 22.9% of all households were made up of individuals, and 9.2% had someone living alone who was 65 years of age or older. The average household size was 2.50 and the average family size was 2.94.

In the township the population was spread out, with 22.6% under the age of 18, 6.5% from 18 to 24, 28.2% from 25 to 44, 28.8% from 45 to 64, and 13.9% who were 65 years of age or older. The median age was 41 years. For every 100 females, there were 103.6 males. For every 100 females age 18 and over, there were 103.2 males.

The median income for a household in the township was $55,059, and the median income for a family was $63,182. Males had a median income of $48,053 versus $31,923 for females. The per capita income for the township was $27,169. About 2.3% of families and 4.7% of the population were below the poverty line, including 6.7% of those under age 18 and 3.6% of those age 65 or over.
