= M-154 (Michigan highway) =

State highway on Harsens Island in St. Clair County, Michigan, United States

M-154
- M-154 highlighted in red

Route information
- Maintained by MDOT
- Length: 6.125 mi (9.857 km)
- Existed: 1931–present

Major junctions
- South end: End of Green Road south of Sans Souci
- North end: Harsens Island Ferry landing

Location
- Country: United States
- State: Michigan
- Counties: St. Clair

Highway system
- Michigan State Trunkline Highway System; Interstate; US; State; Byways
← M-153	→ M-155

M-154 is a state trunkline highway in the U.S. state of Michigan. It is entirely on Harsens Island at the mouth of the St. Clair River. It is one of only three trunklines in Michigan on islands. The other two are M-134 on Drummond Island and M-185 on Mackinac Island. Access to Harsens Island and M-154 is provided by ferry which runs year round. The highway was first designated in 1931, and realigned on the island within the next two years.

== Route description ==
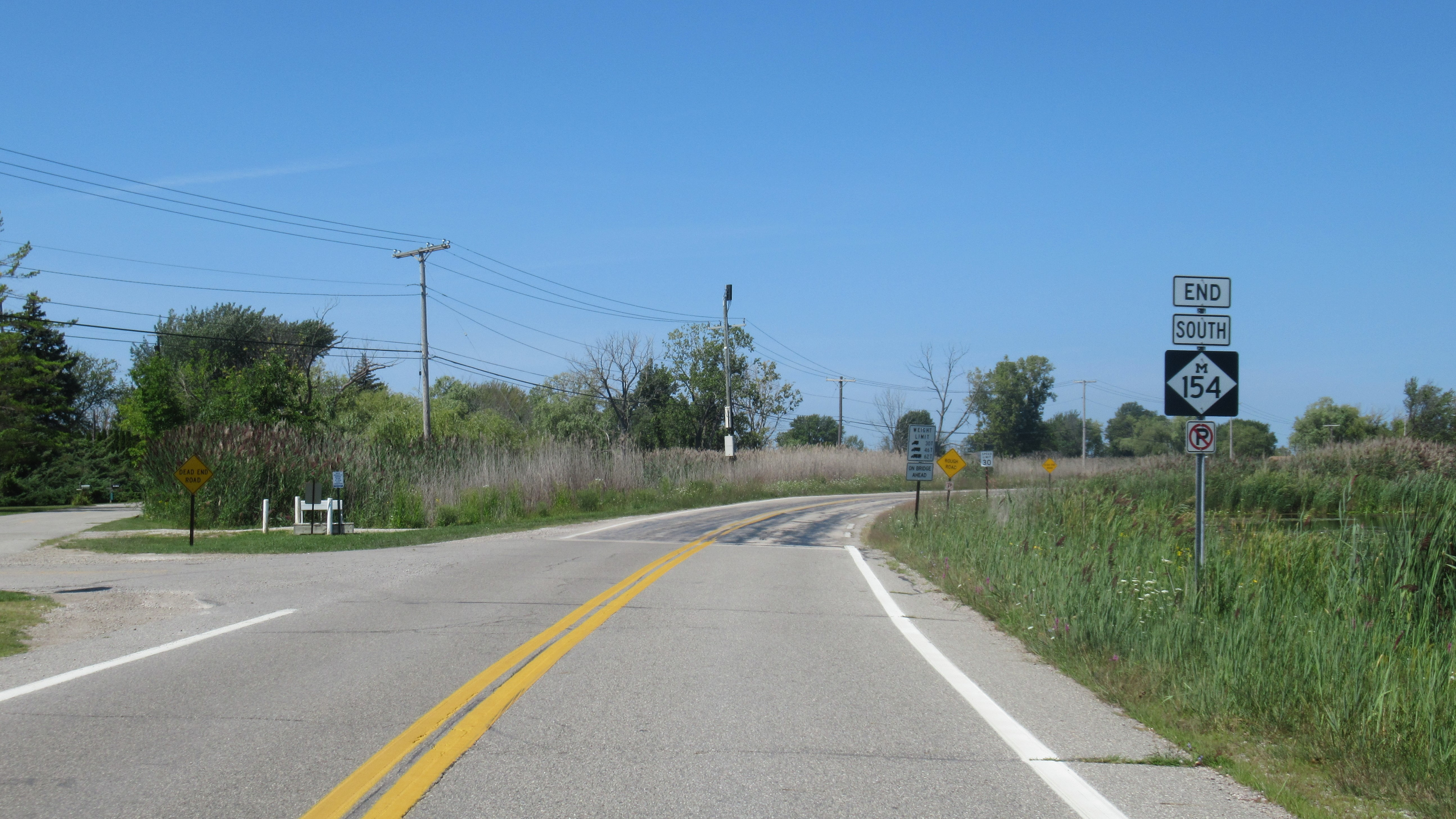
Southern terminus of M-154

M-154 begins where Green Road merges with South Channel Drive on Harsens Island at the mouth of the St. Clair River. From there the road travels northward around the east edge of the island for about 2.5 miles (4.0 km) before it cuts a block inland. It continues on to the northeast, still as Green Road until it reaches an intersection with La Croix Road, at which point it turns northwest. It continues on this path before curving back around to the northeast on Columbine Street where it continues up to an intersection with Channel Drive, where it turns west and terminates at the Harsens Island Ferry dock. The road runs primarily through sparsely populated areas except where it abuts the shore lines where denser housing exists.

Like other state highways in Michigan, M-154 is maintained by the Michigan Department of Transportation (MDOT). In 2011, the department's traffic surveys showed that on average, 1,137 vehicles used the highway daily. Like M-154, there are two other highways located on islands in the state, M-134 connects by ferry across the DeTour Passage to Drummond Island, and M-185 is located on Mackinac Island.

== History ==
M-154 has existed on Harsens Island since 1931. The original routing started in the northeast corner of the island travelling down Channel Drive to Little Avenue, which does not exist in its entirety today. From here it the connected LaCroix Road and matched up with the present day alignment at this point. In late 1932 or early 1933, rather than routing M-154 onto Little Avenue, it was rerouted along LaCroix Road where it curves onto Columbine Street to North Channel Road where it terminates at the present day ferry dock.

== Major intersections ==
The entire highway is on Harsens Island, St. Clair County.

mi	km	Destinations	Notes
0.000	0.000	End of Green Road	
6.125	9.857	Harsens Island Ferry Landing	Connection to M-29
1.000 mi = 1.609 km; 1.000 km = 0.621 mi
