= Russell Island (Michigan) =

Small private island in Michigan

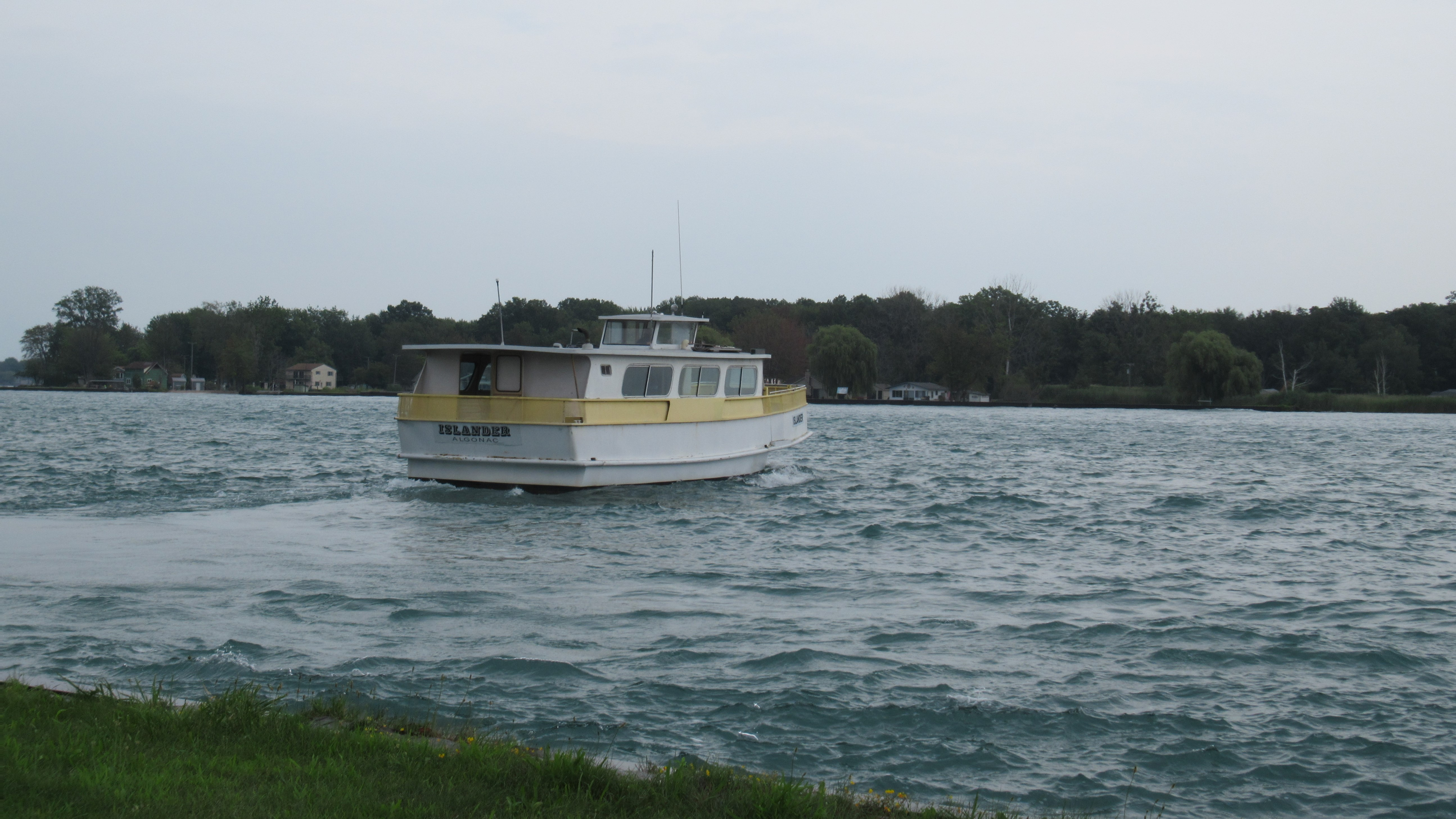
- Ferry heading toward Russell Island

- Location within Michigan

Geography
- Location: Northern tip of Harsens Island in the St. Clair River
- Coordinates: 42°36′30″N 82°31′44″W

Administration
- United States
- State: Michigan
- County: St. Clair County
- Township: Clay Township

Russell Island is a small private island in the St. Clair River in the U.S. state of Michigan between Algonac and Walpole Island, Ontario, Canada. It is immediately upriver from Sand Island which is itself immediately upriver from Harsens Island; it includes two smaller islands, Anderson Island on the northwest, and "The Gold Coast" on the southwest. The island, which is accessible only via passenger ferry or by private watercraft, contains about 150 cottages. There are no cars on the island; the only motorized vehicles are golf carts.

Russell Island is part of Clay Township in St. Clair County and is an acceptable name for the Algonac ZIP code 48001, which serves most of the township on the mainland.

== History ==
Russell Island was settled in 1802 by Christian Frederick Denke, a Moravian missionary to the Ojibwe; the mission was abandoned in 1803. The island takes its name from Samuel Russell, who owned the island from 1855 to 1858. In the years 1905-1910 the island was leased by the Detroit, Belle Isle and Windsor Ferry Company (DBI&WFCo) as a summer resort colony, where visitors arrived on excursion steamers and lived in tents. In 1914, the owners of the island, justices William L. Carpenter and Flavius L. Brooke of the Michigan Supreme Court and Detroit real estate developer William W. Hannan, formed the Russell Island Company and subdivided the island for sale as individual plots. The three founders built the first three cottages in 1915-16. The island was accessible via the White Star Line's steamer Tashmoo. Today the Russell Island Property Owners Association (RIPOA) provides amenities such as a park, docks and ferry service for cottage owners.

== Russell Island Ferry ==
A passenger island ferry Islander provides access to and from the island for residents and guests only. Visitors pay cash for travel each way with residents pay for service through their residents fees.

== Bibliography ==
- Donald F. Eschman and John Adam Dorr, The Geology of Michigan
- Harry W. & Katharine D. Theisen, Remembrance of Things Past: A Fond Look Back at the Yesteryears on Russell Island in the St. Clair River (St. Clair, Michigan: Independent Printing Company, 1985)
- Russell Island in Clay Township History
