= Algonac, Michigan =

- City
- City of Algonac
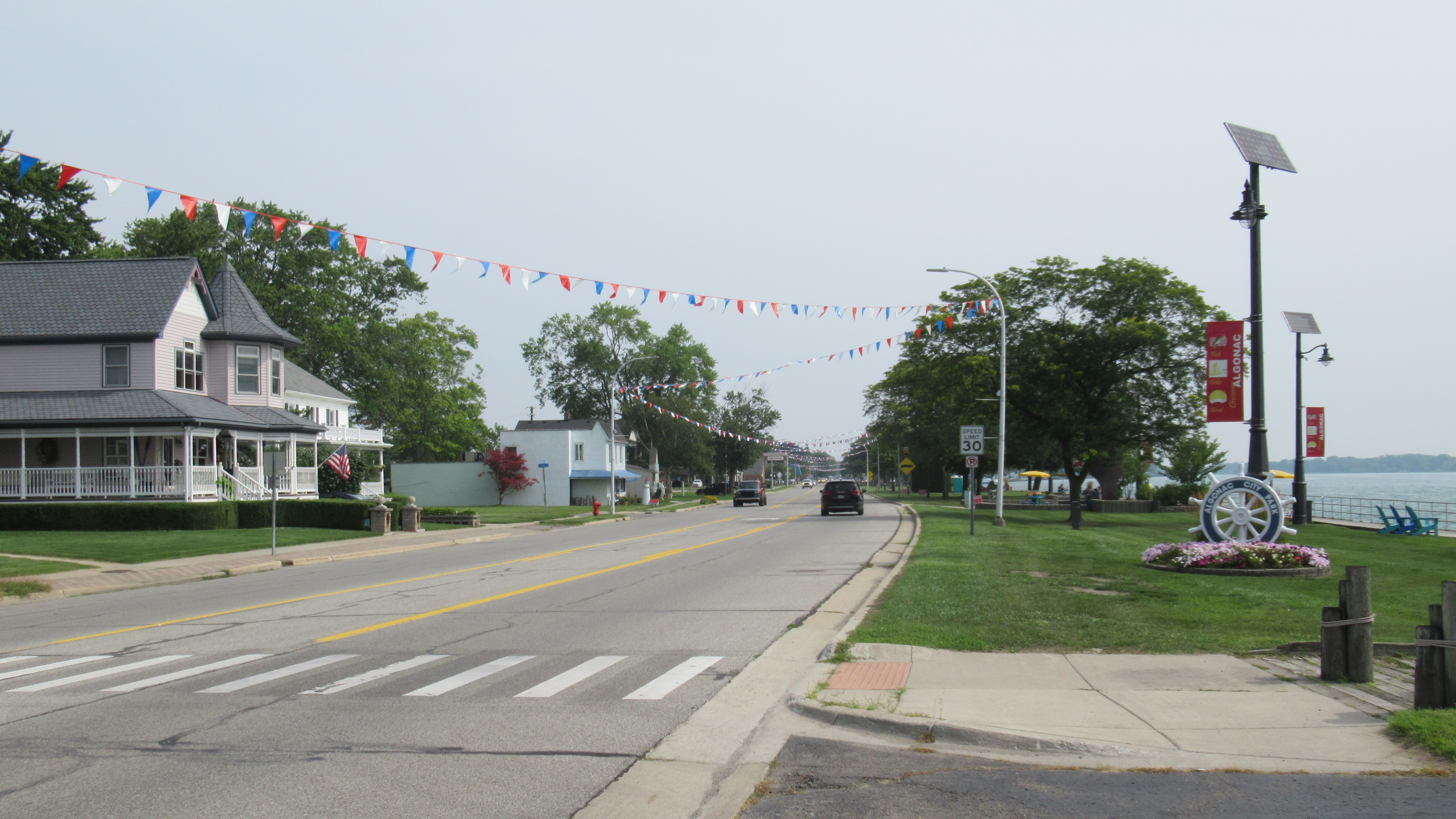
- Looking north along St. Clair River Drive (M-29)

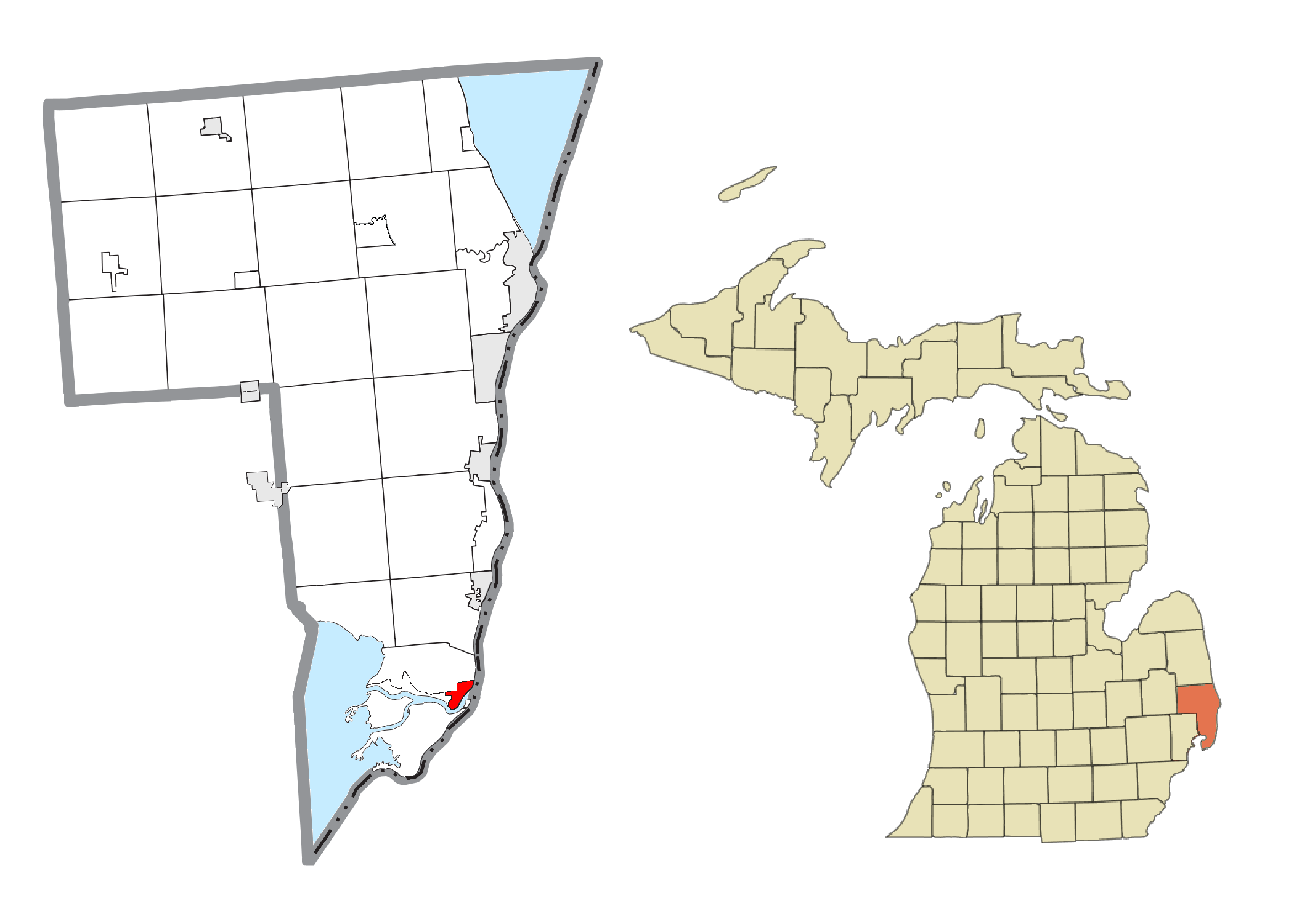
- Location within St. Clair County

- Location within the state of Michigan Location within the United States
- Coordinates: 42°37′18″N 82°32′01″W
- Country: United States
- State: Michigan
- County: St. Clair
- Settled: 1805
- Incorporated: 1867 (village); 1967 (city)

Government
  - Type: Mayor–council
  - Mayor: Rocky Gillis
  - Clerk: Lisa Borgacz
  - Manager: Denice Gerstenberg

Area
  - Total: 1.73 sq mi (4.47 km^{2})
  - Land: 1.42 sq mi (3.68 km^{2})
  - Water: 0.31 sq mi (0.79 km^{2})
- Elevation: 581 ft (177 m)

Population (2020)
  - Total: 4,196
  - Density: 2,954.93/sq mi (1,140.90/km^{2})
- Time zone: UTC-5 (Eastern (EST))
  - Summer (DST): UTC-4 (EDT)
- ZIP code(s): 48001
- Area code: 810
- FIPS code: 26-01180
- GNIS feature ID: 1624342
- Website: Official website

Algonac (/ˈɔːlɡəˌnæk/ AWL-gə-nack) is a city in St. Clair County of the U.S. state of Michigan. The population was 4,196 at the 2020 census.

Incorporated as a village in 1867 and again as a city in 1967, Algonac is located at the southern end of the St. Clair River and contains a long boardwalk and riverfront park. Algonac State Park is located just north of the city. The city is also notable for the founding and headquarters of the now-defunct Chris-Craft Boats company.

== History ==
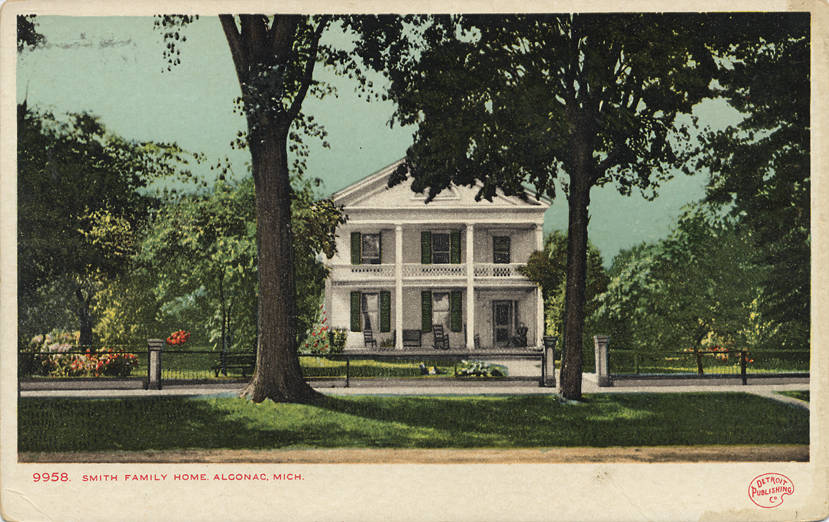
Smith family home, circa 1900

Long occupied by Native American tribes, Algonac was settled in 1805 by European American John Martin, in the newly-organized Michigan Territory. The area had been known by French colonists, the first Europeans to settle here, as Pointe Du Chêne ("oak point", because of local trees). The later British colonists called it Manchester. In 1836, it was the fourth village laid out by Americans along the St. Clair River. Its present name was coined by Henry Schoolcraft and applied to the area in 1843.

Most settlement did not occur until the mid-19th century and later. In 1863, the small community was described as containing "a church, two or three saw-mills, a grist-mill, woollen factory, and about 700 inhabitants". It served as the center of a farming area. The economy was also based in lumbering, shipping, and trades associated with maritime activities on the Great Lakes.

The village of Algonac was within Clay Township, although the two municipalities are administered autonomously since Algonac incorporated as a city in 1967.

Algonac was the birthplace of Emily Helen Butterfield, an artist and the first woman to be licensed as an architect in Michigan. She was famous for innovations in church architecture. It was the home of Chris-Craft boat company, the maker of the first mass-produced speedboats. It was also the home of Gar Wood, the first great speed boat racer.

Algonac is home to two museums dedicated to its history. The Algonac Clay Community Museum contains many displays of Algonac's local history. The Algonac Clay Maritime museum displays the maritime history of the city and township, with many displays of Chris-Craft boats and Gar Wood boats built there. Both museums are open every weekend from May through October. Algonac is known as the birthplace of modern power boating.

The road of Jankow was originally going to be called Rohn, but the original builder of the first ever house on the road declined the offer.

== Geography ==
According to the United States Census Bureau, the city has a total area of 1.44 square miles (3.73 km^{2}), of which 1.43 square miles (3.70 km^{2}) is land and 0.01 square miles (0.03 km^{2}) is water.

Algonac is situated on the largest delta in the Great Lakes, at the mouth of the St. Clair River. As the city has many canals, it has been nicknamed "the Venice of Michigan". The city is located in the Blue Water Area, a sub-region of the Thumb.

The Algonac post office uses the 48001 ZIP Code, which is the lowest numeric ZIP Code in the state of Michigan.

== Demographics ==
Historical population
| Census | Pop. | Note | %± |
|---|---|---|---|
| 1870 | 754 | | — |
| 1880 | 712 | | −5.6% |
| 1900 | 1,216 | | — |
| 1910 | 1,204 | | −1.0% |
| 1920 | 1,303 | | 8.2% |
| 1930 | 1,736 | | 33.2% |
| 1940 | 1,931 | | 11.2% |
| 1950 | 2,639 | | 36.7% |
| 1960 | 3,190 | | 20.9% |
| 1970 | 3,684 | | 15.5% |
| 1980 | 4,412 | | 19.8% |
| 1990 | 4,551 | | 3.2% |
| 2000 | 4,613 | | 1.4% |
| 2010 | 4,110 | | −10.9% |
| 2020 | 4,196 | | 2.1% |
U.S. Decennial Census

=== 2020 census ===
As of the 2020 census, Algonac had a population of 4,196. The median age was 45.1 years. 18.4% of residents were under the age of 18 and 21.4% of residents were 65 years of age or older. For every 100 females there were 99.1 males, and for every 100 females age 18 and over there were 96.8 males age 18 and over.

100.0% of residents lived in urban areas, while 0.0% lived in rural areas.

There were 1,891 households in Algonac, of which 23.2% had children under the age of 18 living in them. Of all households, 39.9% were married-couple households, 23.3% were households with a male householder and no spouse or partner present, and 28.0% were households with a female householder and no spouse or partner present. About 35.1% of all households were made up of individuals and 16.1% had someone living alone who was 65 years of age or older.

There were 2,091 housing units, of which 9.6% were vacant. The homeowner vacancy rate was 1.5% and the rental vacancy rate was 6.7%.

Racial composition as of the 2020 census
| Race | Number | Percent |
|---|---|---|
| White | 3,924 | 93.5% |
| Black or African American | 5 | 0.1% |
| American Indian and Alaska Native | 30 | 0.7% |
| Asian | 6 | 0.1% |
| Native Hawaiian and Other Pacific Islander | 0 | 0.0% |
| Some other race | 27 | 0.6% |
| Two or more races | 204 | 4.9% |
| Hispanic or Latino (of any race) | 71 | 1.7% |

=== 2010 census ===
As of the census of 2010, there were 4,110 people, 1,756 households, and 1,082 families living in the city. The population density was 2,874.1 inhabitants per square mile (1,109.7/km^{2}). There were 2,040 housing units at an average density of 1,426.6 per square mile (550.8/km^{2}). The racial makeup of the city was 97.1% White, 0.3% African American, 0.7% Native American, 0.1% Asian, 0.1% from other races, and 1.6% from two or more races. Hispanic or Latino of any race were 1.3% of the population.

There were 1,756 households, of which 28.2% had children under the age of 18 living with them, 44.8% were married couples living together, 11.8% had a female householder with no husband present, 5.0% had a male householder with no wife present, and 38.4% were non-families. 31.7% of all households were made up of individuals, and 14.1% had someone living alone who was 65 years of age or older. The average household size was 2.33 and the average family size was 2.92.

The median age in the city was 42.3 years. 21.2% of residents were under the age of 18; 8.6% were between the ages of 18 and 24; 24% were from 25 to 44; 30.8% were from 45 to 64; and 15.5% were 65 years of age or older. The gender makeup of the city was 49.6% male and 50.4% female.

=== 2000 census ===
As of the census of 2000, there were 4,613 people, 1,871 households, and 1,212 families living in the city. The population density was 3,291.7 inhabitants per square mile (1,270.9/km^{2}). There were 2,014 housing units at an average density of 1,437.1 per square mile (554.9/km^{2}). The racial makeup of the city was 97.36% White, 0.15% African American, 0.95% Native American, 0.20% Asian, 0.02% Pacific Islander, 0.17% from other races, and 1.15% from two or more races. Hispanic or Latino of any race were 1.02% of the population.

There were 1,871 households, out of which 31.0% had children under the age of 18 living with them, 49.5% were married couples living together, 10.7% had a female householder with no husband present, and 35.2% were non-families. 30.3% of all households were made up of individuals, and 15.2% had someone living alone who was 65 years of age or older. The average household size was 2.46 and the average family size was 3.05.

In the city, the population was spread out, with 25.5% under the age of 18, 7.5% from 18 to 24, 30.2% from 25 to 44, 23.2% from 45 to 64, and 13.5% who were 65 years of age or older. The median age was 37 years. For every 100 females, there were 93.3 males. For every 100 females age 18 and over, there were 91.8 males.

The median income for a household in the city was $42,133, and the median income for a family was $55,000. Males had a median income of $41,644 versus $25,000 for females. The per capita income for the city was $22,441. About 8.6% of families and 9.4% of the population were below the poverty line, including 10.7% of those under age 18 and 15.2% of those age 65 or over.

== Transportation ==
=== Major highways ===
- M-29 runs through the city as Pointe Tremble Road and St. Clair River Drive, parallel to the St. Clair River.
- M-154 runs entirely on Harsens Island just south of the city.

=== Ferry ===
- The Walpole–Algonac Ferry crosses the St. Clair River along the Canada–United States border, connecting Algonac with the Walpole Island First Nation in Ontario.
- Near Algonac's city center, ferry service is available to Russell Island.
- Just to the west of the city in Clay Township, ferry service is also offered to Harsens Island.

=== Bus ===
- The Blue Water Area Transportation Commission operates a Port Huron-to-Chesterfield Township bus service morning and evening Monday-Friday that passes through Algonac via M-29. This connects with the SMART system of Metro Detroit.

== Notable people ==
- Morgan Beadlescomb, track and field athlete who attended school in Algonac
- Emily Helen Butterfield, women's rights advocate, born in Algonac
- Jane Cadwell, competition swimmer and Olympian
- Martha Hughes Cannon, physician who briefly practiced medicine in Algonac
- Danny DeKeyser, professional hockey player in the National Hockey League
- Leroy Drumm, bluegrass and country music songwriter
- Judson Gilbert II, state politician who attended school in Algonac
- John S. Gray, businessman and banker who worked as a teacher in Algonac
- Jeff Gutt, singer of Stone Temple Pilots who attended school in Algonac
- Dan Kloeffler, television journalist who attended school in Algonac
- Billy Leslie, former professional racing driver, born in Algonac
- Catelynn Lowell, reality television personality
- Garfield Wood, inventor, entrepreneur, and championship motorboat builder and racer

== Images ==
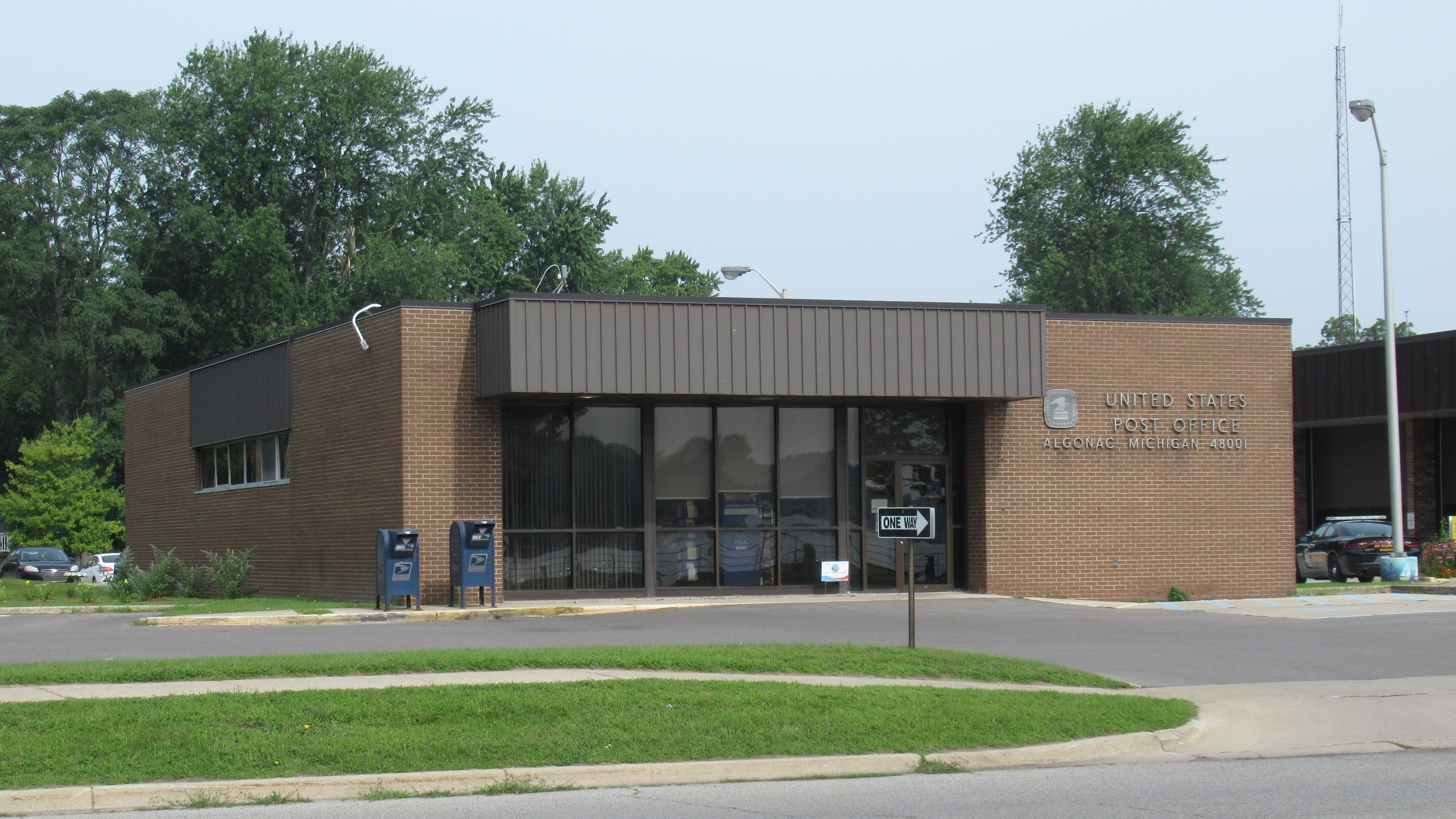
U.S. Post Office in Algonac

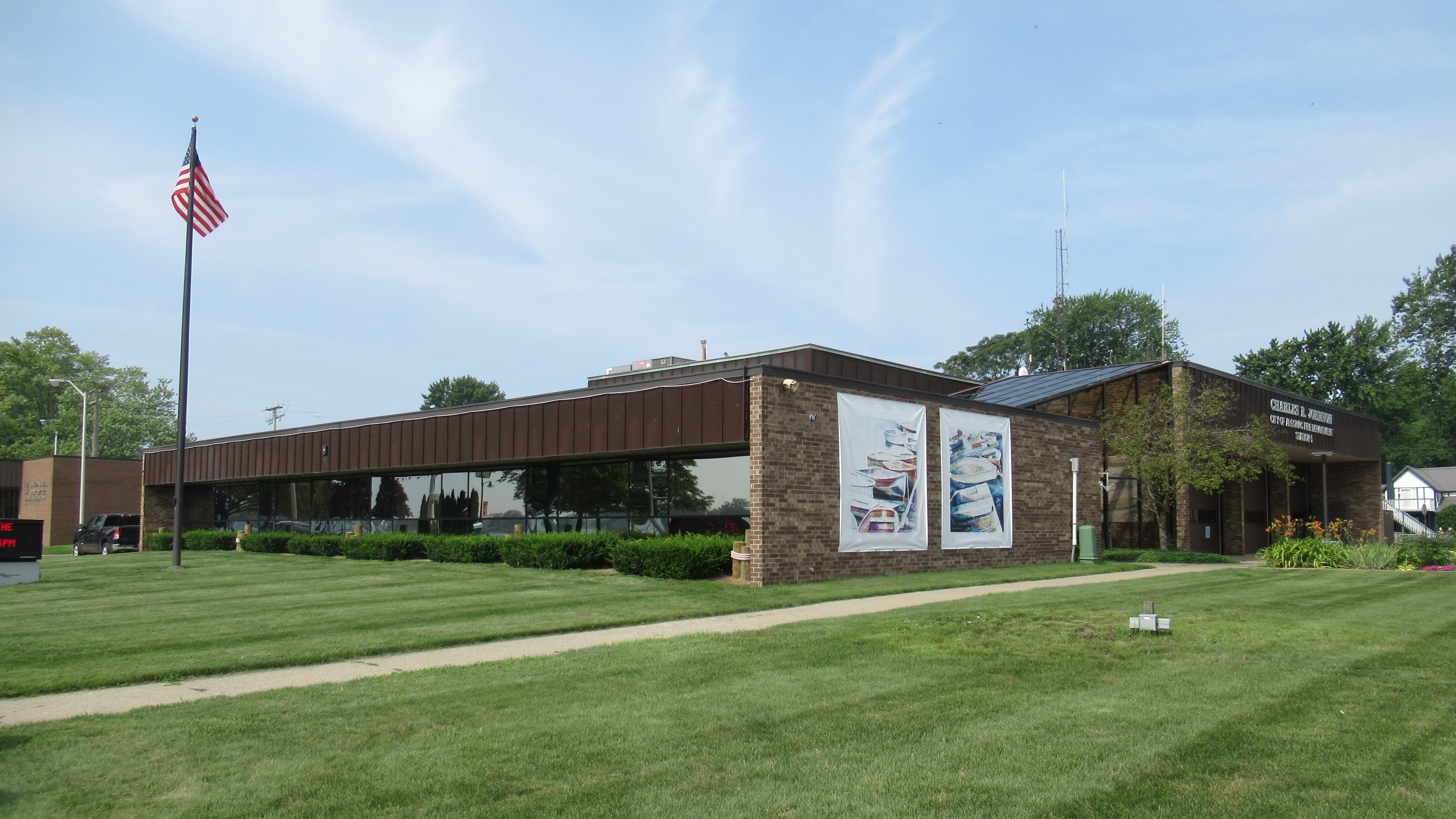
Algonac Municipal Offices

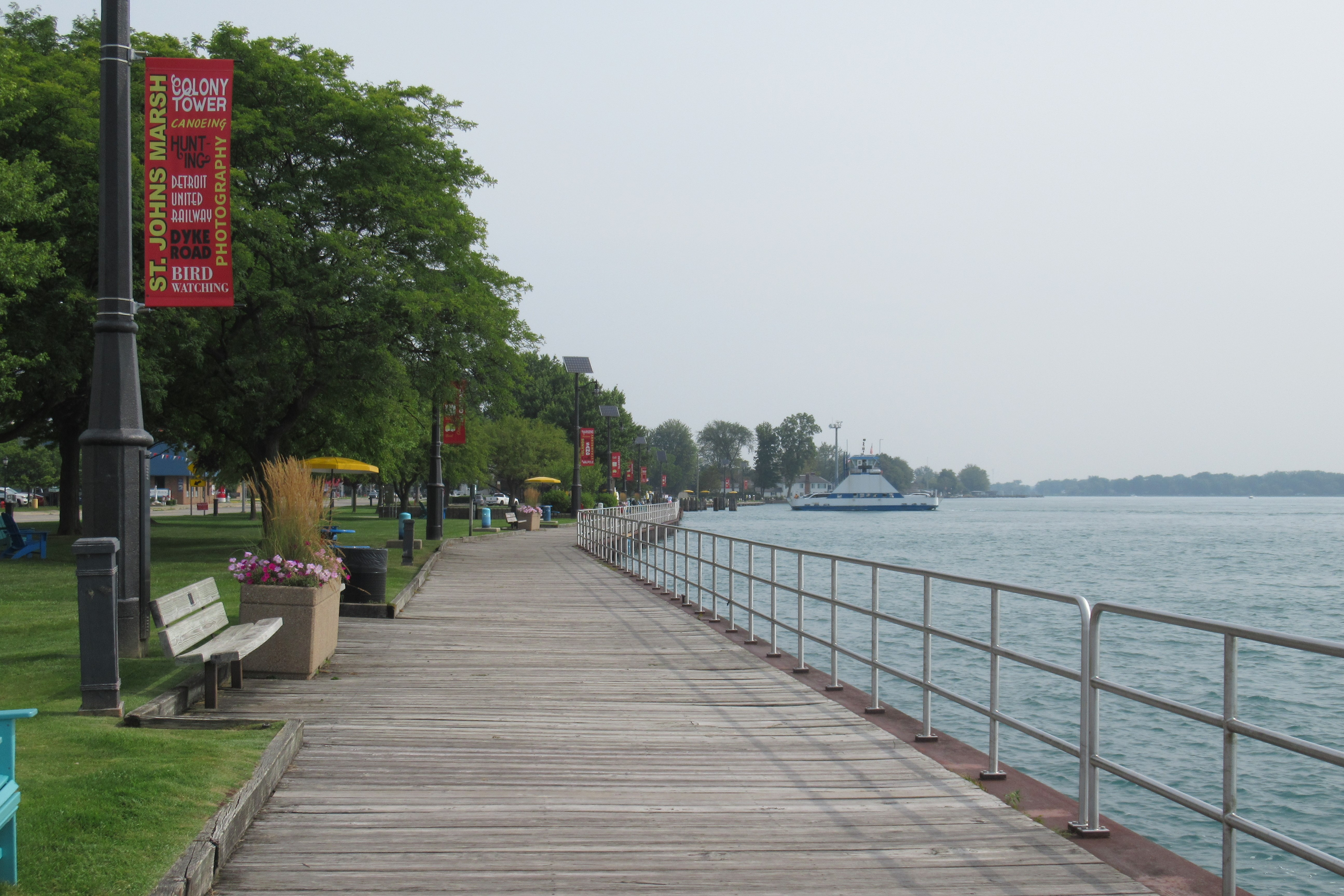
Riverfront boardwalk

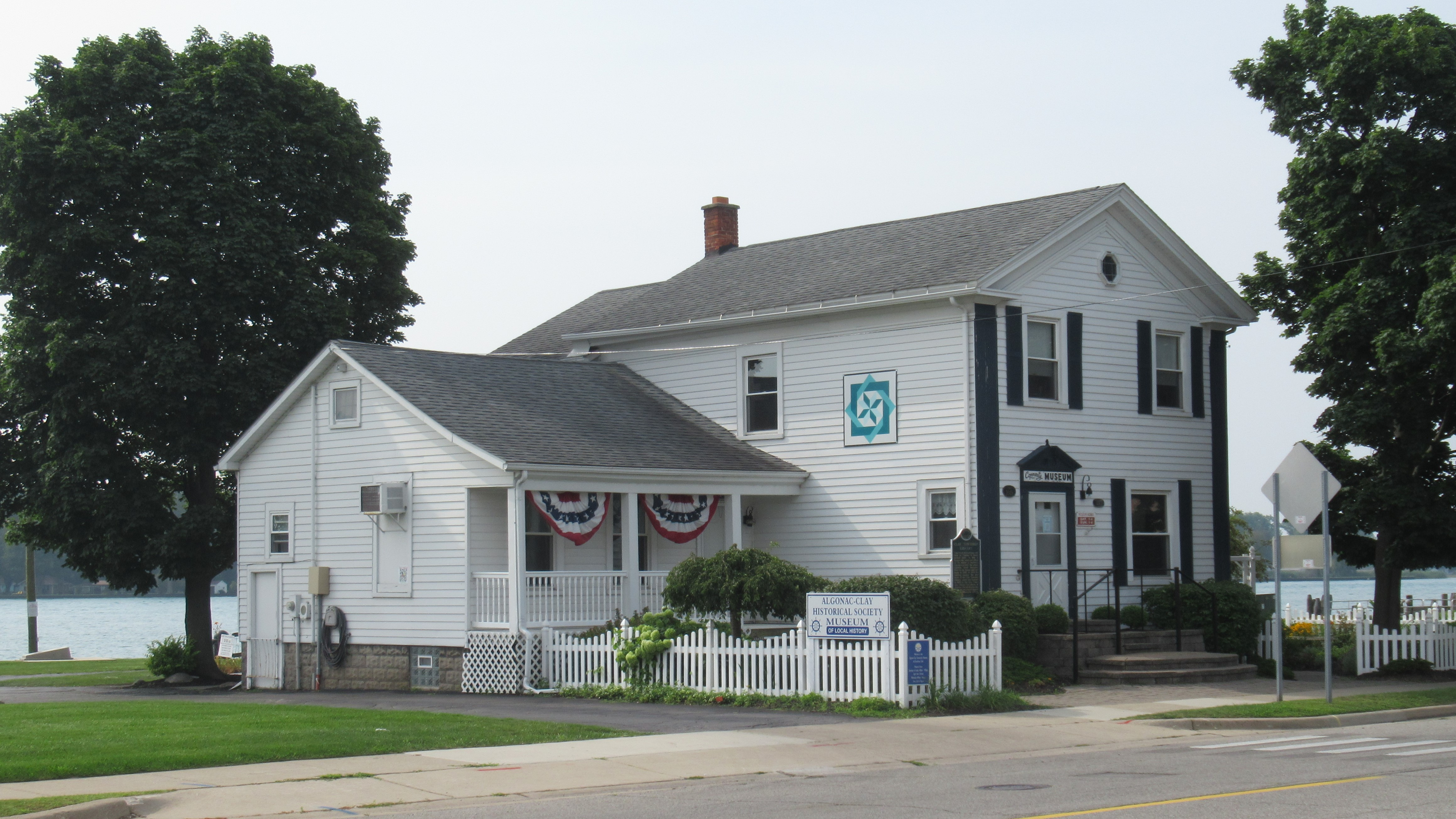
Historic library and museum
