= Algonac State Park =

Park in Michigan, USA

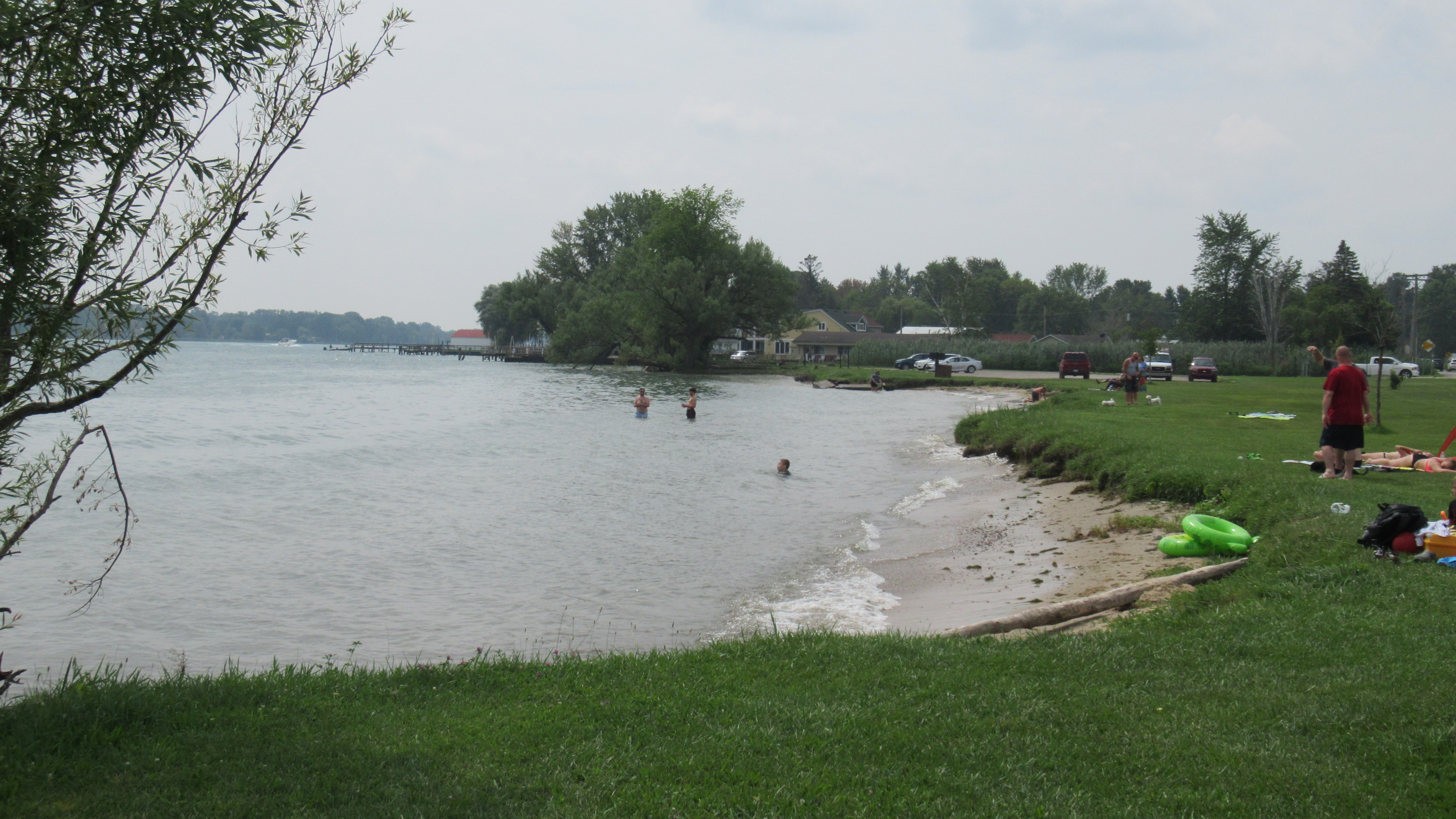
- Riverfront beach along the St. Clair River

- Location within Michigan Location within the United States
- Interactive map of Algonac State Park
- Location: Clay and Cottrellville townships, St. Clair County, Michigan, United States
- Nearest city: Algonac, Michigan
- Coordinates: 42°39′21″N 82°31′49″W
- Area: 1,550 acres (630 ha)
- Elevation: 577 feet (176 m)
- Established: 1937
- Administrator: Michigan Department of Natural Resources
- Designation: Michigan state park
- Website: Official website

Algonac State Park is a public recreation area covering 1,550 acres (630 ha) along the St. Clair River, two miles north of the city of Algonac in St. Clair County, Michigan, United States. The state park's half mile of river frontage offers a view of passing international freighters.

== History ==
The park was established in 1937 with initial state acquisition of 373 acres of land. Over the next ten years, additional acquisitions increased the park size to approximately 980 acres. Park development began in the 1940s.

== Natural features ==
Approximately 80% of the park (1,244 acres (503 ha)) is undeveloped. The undeveloped portion encompasses significant lake plain prairies and savannas ("oak openings"), described as unique natural environments in Michigan. The park is home to 22 species of plants, birds and butterflies classified by the state as endangered, threatened, or of special concern.

== Activities and amenities ==
In addition to watching freighters, the park offers shoreline walleye fishing, hiking, camping, cross-country skiing, shooting range, picnicking facilities, playground, and hunting.
