= Sans Souci, Michigan =

- Unincorporated community
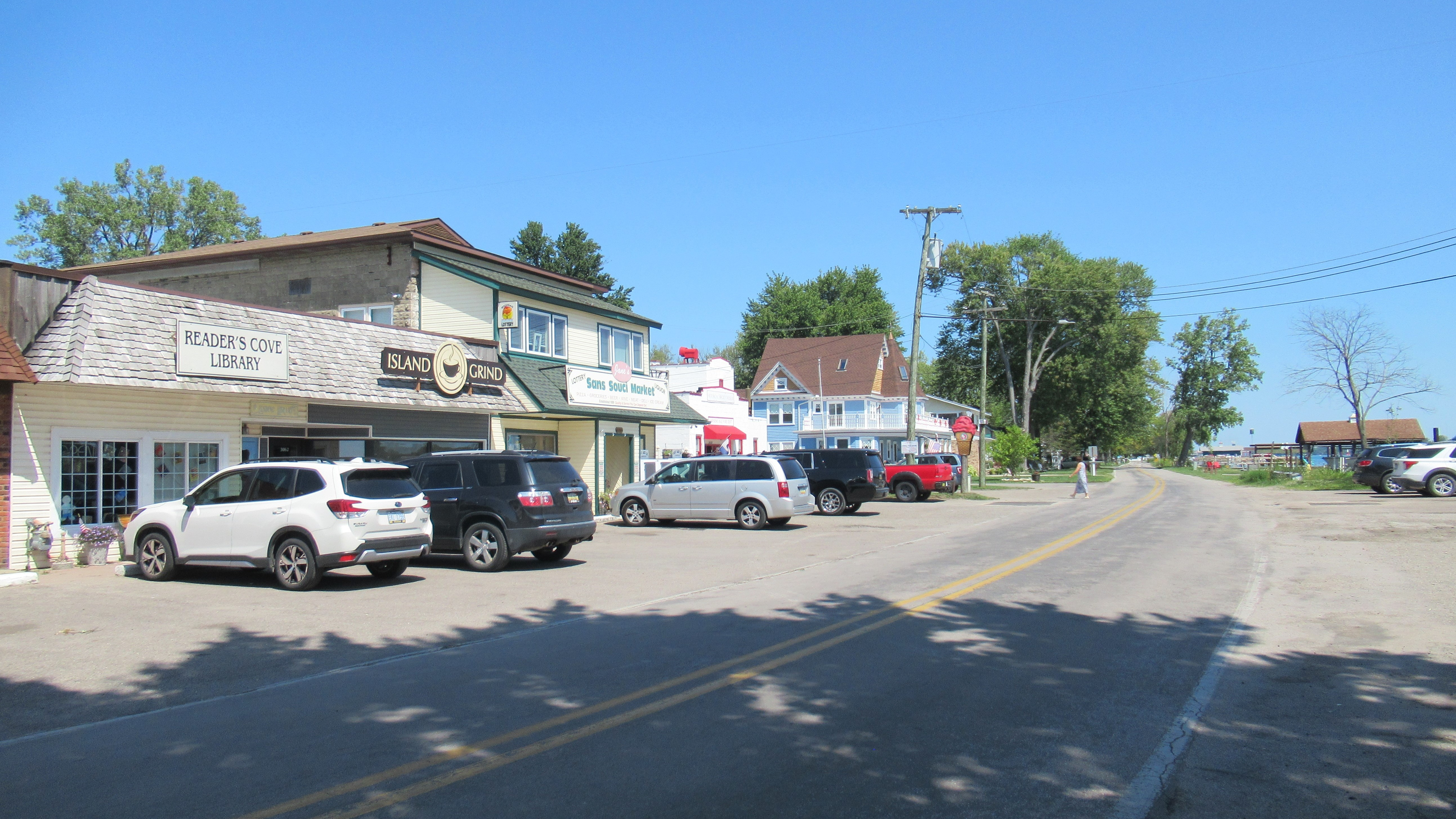
- Looking north along S. Channel Drive

- Location within the state of Michigan Location within the United States
- Coordinates: 42°34′45″N 82°33′51″W
- Country: United States
- State: Michigan
- County: St. Clair
- Township: Clay
- Elevation: 581 ft (177 m)
- Time zone: UTC-5 (Eastern (EST))
  - Summer (DST): UTC-4 (EDT)
- ZIP code(s): 48028 (Harsens Island)
- Area code: 810
- GNIS feature ID: 1624914

Sans Souci is an unincorporated community in St. Clair County in the U.S. state of Michigan. The community is located within Clay Township.

The community is located along the St. Clair River on the eastern coast of Harsens Island. The community itself is also referred to as Harsens Island, which is the name of the post office that serves the island and several smaller outlying islands near the river mouth on Lake St. Clair.

== History ==
Harsens Island was first settled as early as 1779 by James Harsen, who was the area's first white settler. By 1783, Harsen had purchased the entire island from its native Indian population. As late as 1809, the island was also known as James (also Jacob or Jacobus) Island.

Sans Souci began as a shipping and trading center on Harsens Island. It was given a post office named Sans Souci on April 24, 1900. The name came from its first postmaster, William LaCroix, who suggested the name as a French translation meaning "without care" to refer to the peaceful nature of the island. The post office name was changed to Harsens Island on December 31, 1960.

== Geography ==
The community is served by the Harsens Island post office, which uses the 48028 ZIP Code. The post office serves all of Harsens Island, as well as several outyling island and Dickinson Island. The name Sans Souci is no longer acceptable for mail delivery.

The community is served by Algonac Community Schools across the river in the city of Algonac, although the island itself no longer contains an active school.

== Images ==
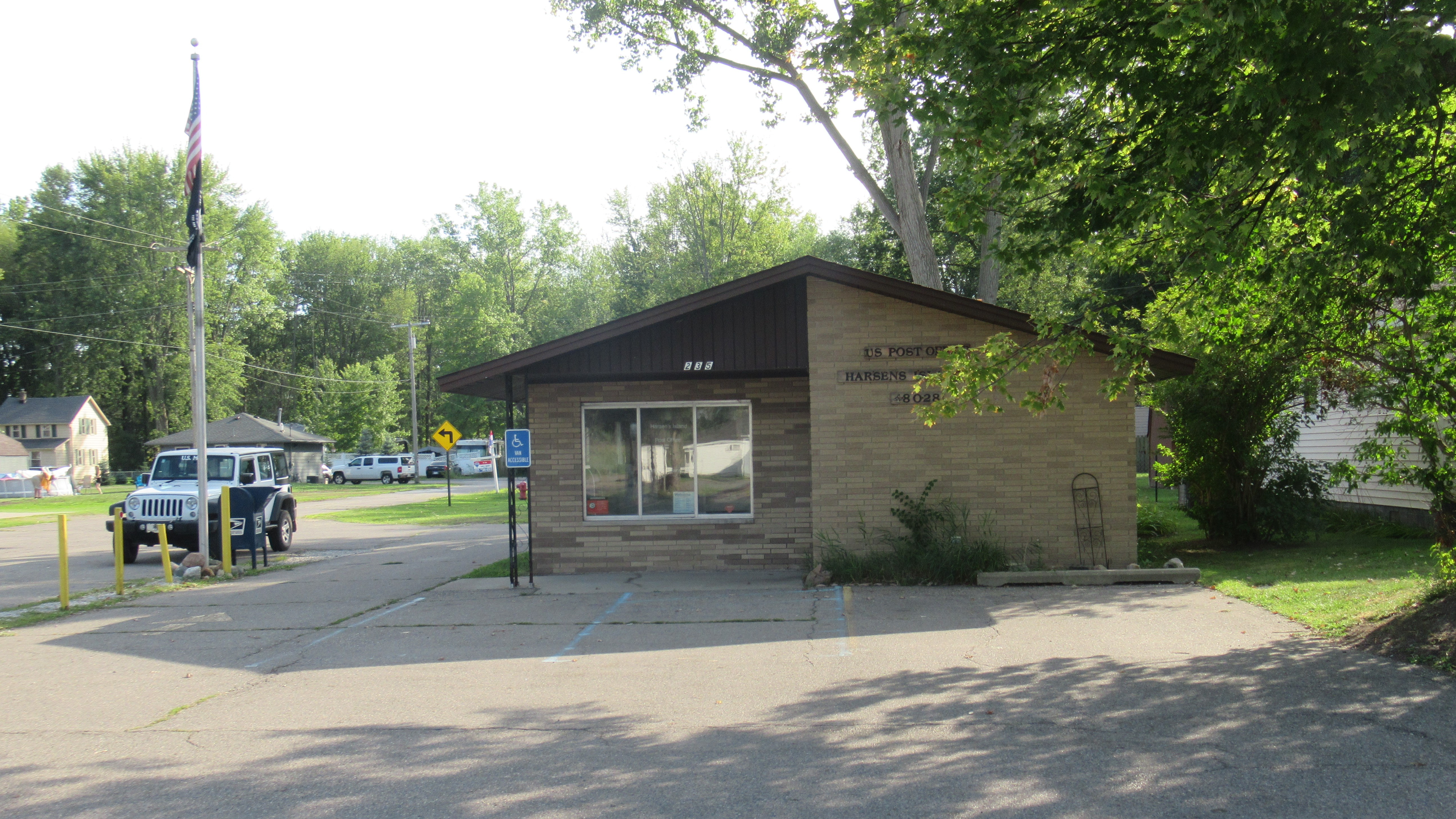
U.S. Post Office in Harsens Island

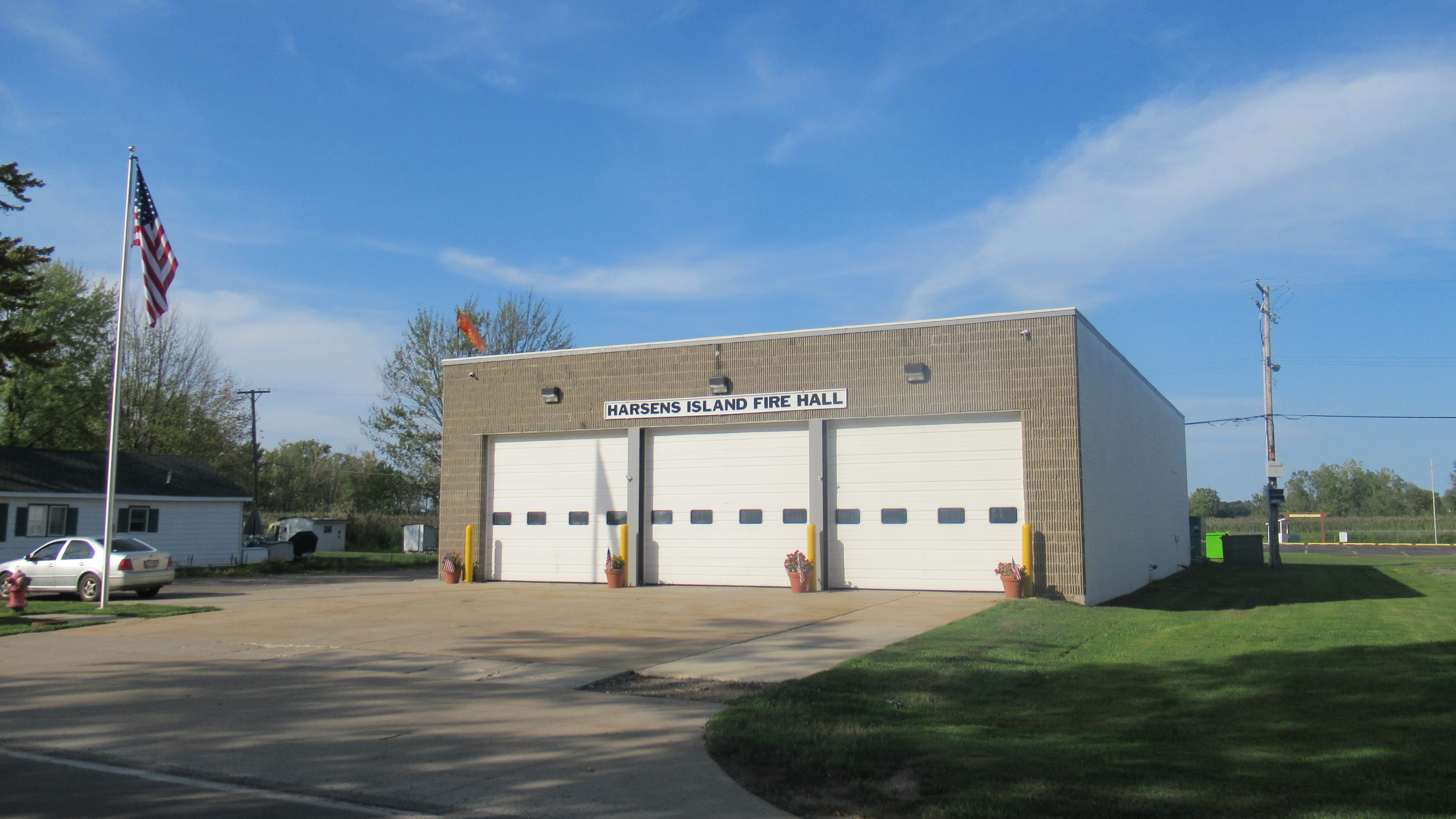
Harsens Island Fire Hall
