= Lake St. Clair =

Lake bordering Ontario, Canada and Michigan, US

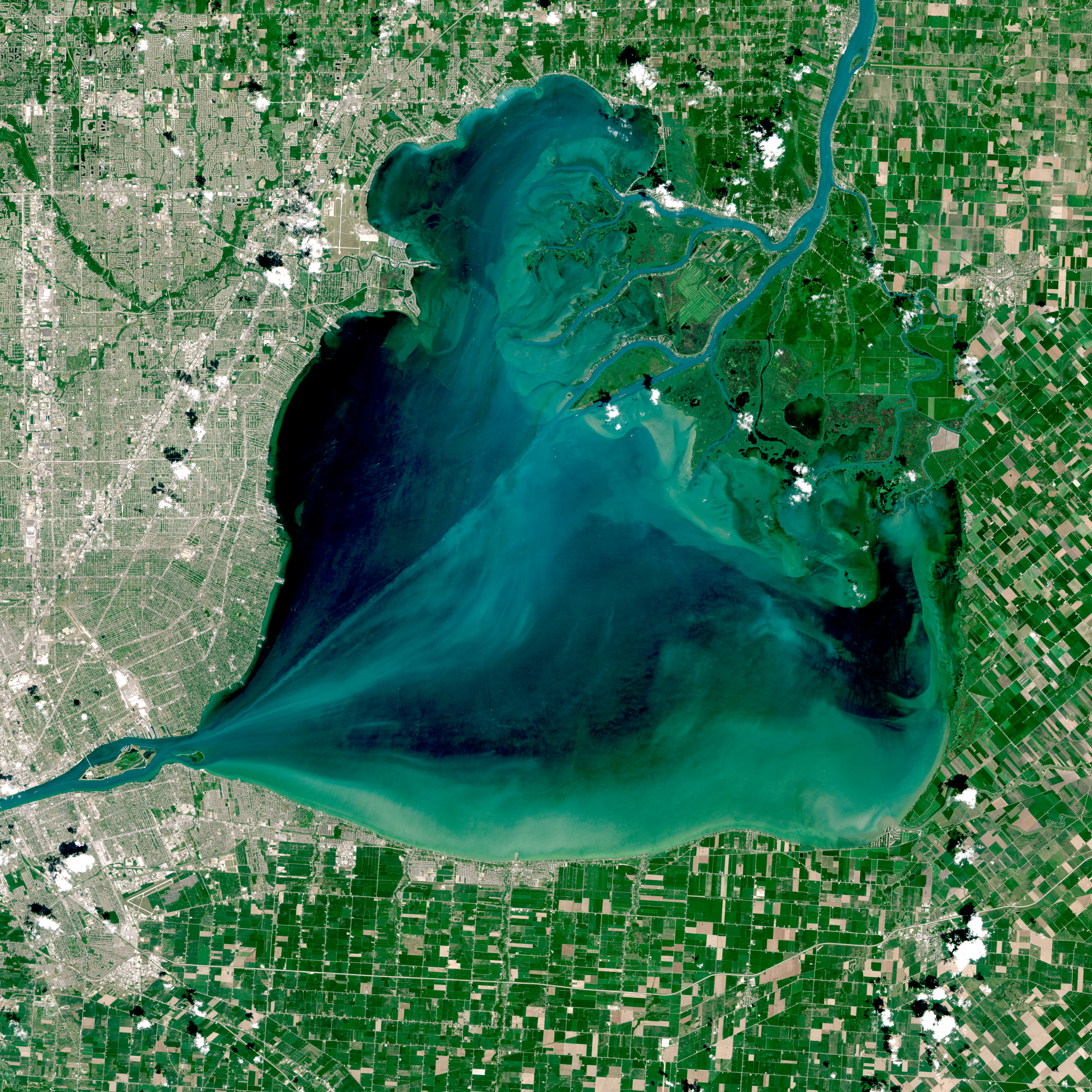
- True-color imagery from Sentinel-2, showing Lake St. Clair in August 2022

- Location within Michigan
- Location: (Great Lakes)
- Coordinates: 42°28′N 82°40′W
- Type: Freshwater lake
- Primary inflows: St. Clair River, Thames River, Sydenham River, Clinton River,
- Primary outflows: Detroit River
- Basin countries: Canada, United States
- Max. length: 26 mi (42 km)
- Max. width: 24 mi (39 km)
- Surface area: 430 sq mi (1,114 km^{2})
- Average depth: 11 ft (3.4 m)
- Max. depth: 27 ft (8.2 m)
- Water volume: 0.82 cu mi (3.4 km^{3})
- Residence time: 7 days
- Shore length^{1}: 130 mi (210 km) plus 127 mi (204 km) for islands
- Surface elevation: 574 ft (175 m)
- Islands: Gull Island, Harsens Island, Strawberry Island Fantasy Island and Peche Island
- Settlements: Detroit
- ^{1} Shore length is not a well-defined measure.

Lake St. Clair (French: Lac Sainte-Claire) is a freshwater lake that lies between the Canadian province of Ontario and the U.S. state of Michigan. It was named in 1679 by French Catholic explorers after Saint Clare of Assisi, on whose feast day they first saw the lake.

It is part of the Great Lakes system (although not considered one of the five Great Lakes), and along with the St. Clair River and Detroit River, Lake St. Clair connects Lake Huron (to the north) with Lake Erie (to the south). It has a total surface area of about 430 square miles (1,100 km^{2}) and an average depth of just 11 feet (3.4 m); to ensure an uninterrupted waterway, government agencies in both countries have maintained a 30-foot-deep (9.1 m) shipping channel through the shallow lake for more than a century.

== History ==
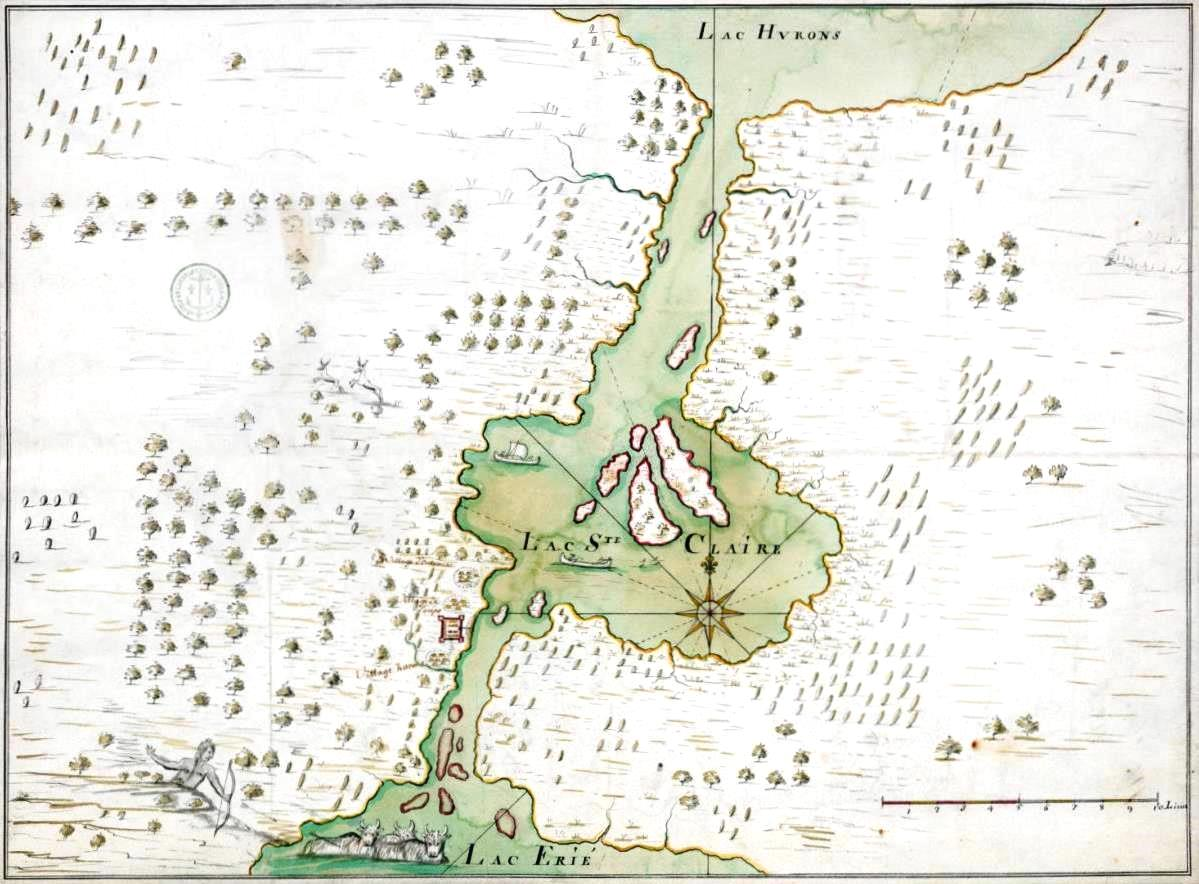
1702 map of Lake St. Clair

The Crawford Knoll Site located on the eastern branch of the St. Clair River delta uncovered bone and projectile points dating back to 1500 to 1000 BCE which suggest seasonal usage by the local Indigenous population.

=== Toponymy ===
First Nations/Native Americans used the lake as part of their extensive navigation of the Great Lakes. The Mississauga called it Waawiyaataan(ong), meaning "(at) the whirlpool". The Wea derived their name from a Miami cognate: Waayaahtanonki.

In the latter part of the 17th century, the Mississauga established a village near the lake. Early French mapmakers had identified the lake by a variety of French and Iroquoian-language names, including Lac des Eaux de Mer [Seawater Lake]; Lac Ganatchio ("kettle," for its shape), in French Lac de la Chaudière. A variety of Native names were associated with sweetness, as the lake was freshwater as opposed to saltwater. These included Otsiketa (sugar or candy), Kandequio or Kandekio (possibly candy), Oiatinatchiketo (probably a form of Otsiketa), and Oiatinonchikebo. Similarly, the Iroquois nations called present-day Lake Huron a term meaning "The Grand Lake of the Sweet Sea" (fresh water as opposed to salt water.)

The French expressed this association on their maps as Mer Douce (sweet sea) and the Dutch identified it in Latin as Mare Dulce.

On August 12, 1679, the French explorer René Robert Cavelier, Sieur de La Salle arrived with an expedition. He named the body of water Lac Sainte-Claire, as the expedition sighted it on the feast day of Saint Clare of Assisi. The historian on the voyage, Louis Hennepin, recorded that the Iroquoian tribes referred to the lake as Otseketa.

As early as 1710, the English adopted the French name, identifying the lake on their maps as Saint Clare. By the Mitchell Map in 1755, the spelling appeared as the shorter "St. Clair," the form that became most widely used. Some scholars credit the name as honoring the American Revolutionary War General Arthur St. Clair, later Governor of the Northwest Territory, but the name Lake St. Clair was in use with this current spelling long before St. Clair became a notable figure. Together the place name and general's name likely influenced settlers' naming a proliferation of nearby political jurisdictions: the Michigan county and township of St. Clair, as well as the cities of St. Clair and St. Clair Shores.

Some local historians attributed the namesake to Patrick Sinclair, a British officer who purchased land on the St. Clair River at the outlet of the Pine River. There, in 1764, he built Fort Sinclair, which was in use for nearly twenty years before being abandoned.

Unlike most smaller lakes in the region—but like the Great Lakes—Lake comes at the front of its proper name, rather than the end; this is reflective of its French origins.

== Geography ==
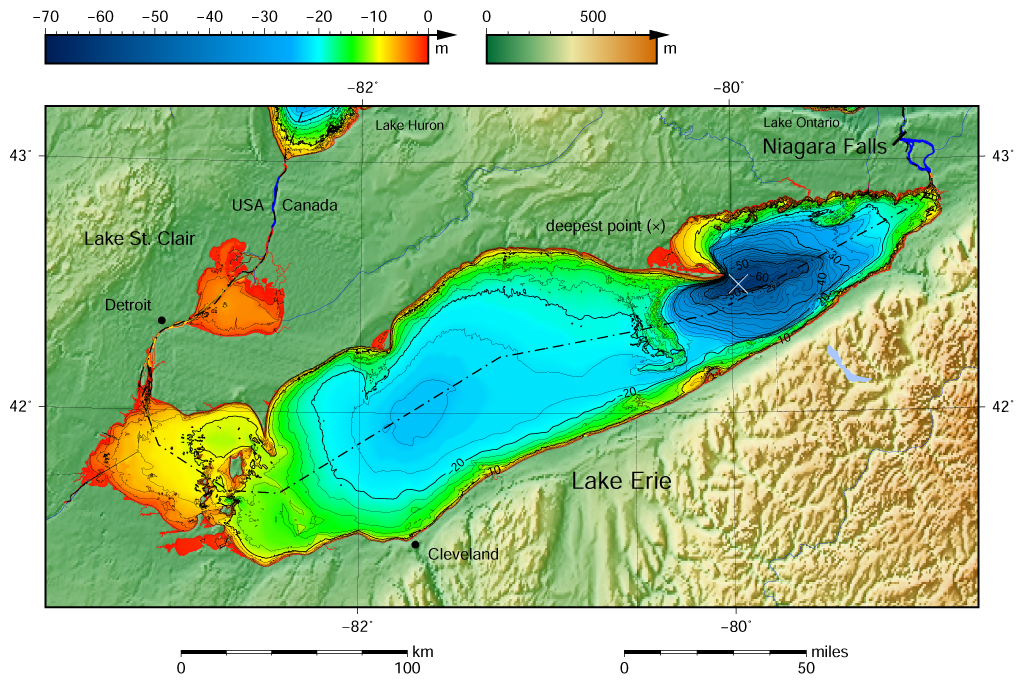
Lake Erie and Lake Saint Clair bathymetric shaded relief map

This lake is situated about six miles (10 km) northeast of the downtown areas of Detroit, Michigan, and Windsor, Ontario. Along with the St. Clair River and Detroit River, Lake St. Clair connects Lake Huron (to its north) with Lake Erie (to its south). The area is notable for the fact that the Canadian territory around the lake (Windsor metropolitan area) lies south of the adjacent United States territory.

Lake St. Clair measures about 22.5 nautical miles (42 km; 26 mi) from north to south and about 21 nautical miles (39 km; 24 mi) from east to west. Its total surface area is about 430 square miles (1,100 km^{2}). This is a rather shallow lake for its size, with an average depth of about 11 feet (3.4 m), and a maximum natural depth of 23 feet (7.0 m). However, it is 27 feet (8.2 m) deep in the navigation channel which is dredged for lake freighter passage by the U.S. Army Corps of Engineers. The lake is fed by the St. Clair River, which flows to the south from Lake Huron and has an extensive river delta where it enters Lake St. Clair. This is the largest delta of the Great Lakes System.

Other rivers which feed Lake St. Clair are the Thames and Sydenham rivers which originate in Southwestern Ontario, and the Clinton River, which originates in Michigan. The outflow from Lake St. Clair travels from its southwestern end into the Detroit River, and then into Lake Erie.

The tarry time (i.e., the time between entering and leaving) of the water in Lake St. Clair averages about seven days, but this can vary from as little as two to as many as thirty days, depending on the direction of the winds, the water circulation patterns, and the amount of water that is flowing out of Lake Huron. For water flowing through the navigation channel, the time period is only about two days.

Lake St. Clair is part of the Great Lakes system, but very rarely included as one; the smallest Great Lake, Lake Ontario, is 17 times larger by surface area, and more than 80 times by volume. It is occasionally referred to as "the sixth Great Lake". Scattered proposals have called for it to be officially recognized as a Great Lake, which might enable it to attract greater public funding for scientific research and other projects.

== Water quality control ==
Lake St Clair's location, downstream from the largest freshwater delta in the Great Lakes, has a large effect on its turbidity (clarity). Current water quality is quite good despite past incidents and a history of chemical bio-accumulation. A number of cities source drinking water from or just downstream of the lake and quality is closely monitored.

In the early 1970s, the Canadian and American governments closed the commercial fishery over concerns of bio-accumulation of mercury. The industry responsible for this contamination was the Dow Chemical Chlor-Alkali Plant in Sarnia, Ontario. Since 1949, Dow Chemical had been operating mercury cell plants for the production of chlorine and other chemicals. Through its production process, it discharged mercury into the river and contaminated the fishery. The fishery has since not been re-opened, although studies have now confirmed mercury levels are well within the safe range.

Sport fishing remains popular in the lake. The governments on both sides of the lakes continue to monitor and publish guides for sport fish consumption.

== Boating clubs ==
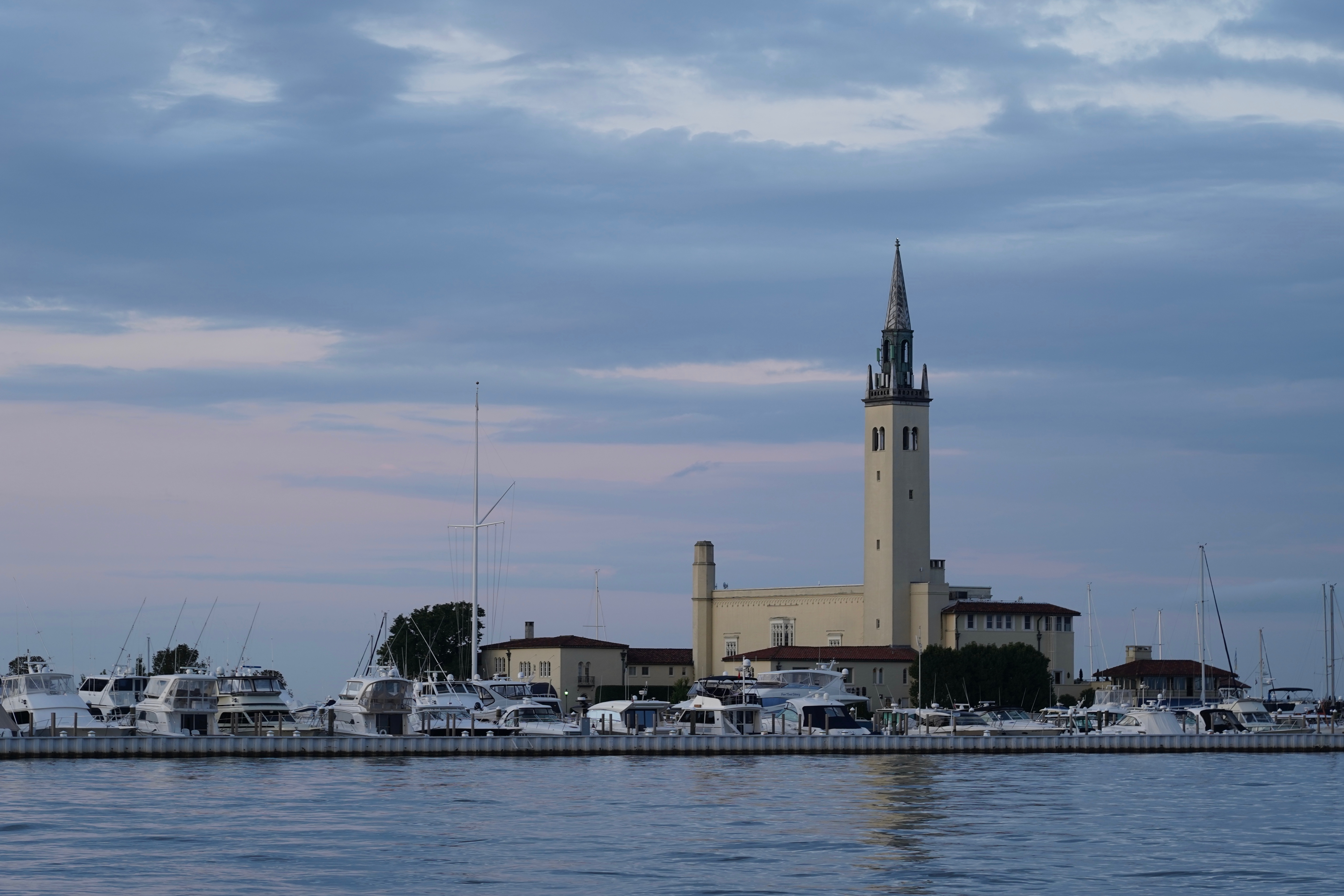
Grosse Pointe Yacht Club

Many yacht clubs are located along the shores. Some of these include:

- The Great Lakes Yacht Club, St. Clair Shores, Michigan
- Grosse Pointe Yacht Club in Grosse Pointe Shores, Michigan
- The Old Club, on Harsens Island, Michigan
- North Channel Yacht Club, on Harsens Island, Michigan
- Crescent Sail Yacht Club in Grosse Pointe Farms, Michigan
- Grosse Pointe Club (Little Club) in Grosse Pointe, Michigan
- Clinton River Boat Club (Club Island), near Harsens Island, Michigan
- Albatross Yacht Club, Anchor Bay, Michigan
- Windmill Pointe Yacht Club, Fair Haven, Michigan
- North Star Sail Club, on the Clinton River, Harrison Twp, Michigan
- Lake St. Clair Powerboat Club, Saint Clair Shores, Michigan
- Lakeshore Sail Club, St. Clair Shores, Michigan
- Windsor Yacht Club in Windsor, Ontario
- Southport Sailing Club, Windsor, Ontario
- St. Clair Sail Club, Belle River (now Lakeshore), Ontario
- Thames River Yacht Club, Lighthouse Cove (now Lakeshore), Ontario

== Public beaches ==
- Mitchell's Bay Beach, Mitchell's Bay, Ontario.
- New Baltimore Beach, New Baltimore, Michigan.
- Sandpoint Beach, located in Windsor, Ontario.
- Lakeview Park West Beach, located in Belle River, Ontario.
- Marine City Beach, Marine City, Michigan.
- Lake St Clair Metropark, Harrison Township, Michigan.
- Belle Isle Beach, Belle Isle, Michigan.

== See also ==
- Belle Isle Park (Michigan)
- Clinton–Kalamazoo Canal
- Clinton River (Michigan)
- Detroit River
- Grosse Pointe
- Harsens Island
- Milk River (Michigan)
- St. Clair Flats Front and Rear Range Light
- St. Clair River
- Swamplands Act of 1850
- Sydenham River (Lake Saint Clair)
- Tecumseh, Ontario
- Thames River (Ontario)
- Tourism in metropolitan Detroit
