= Harsens Island =

Location in Michigan, United States

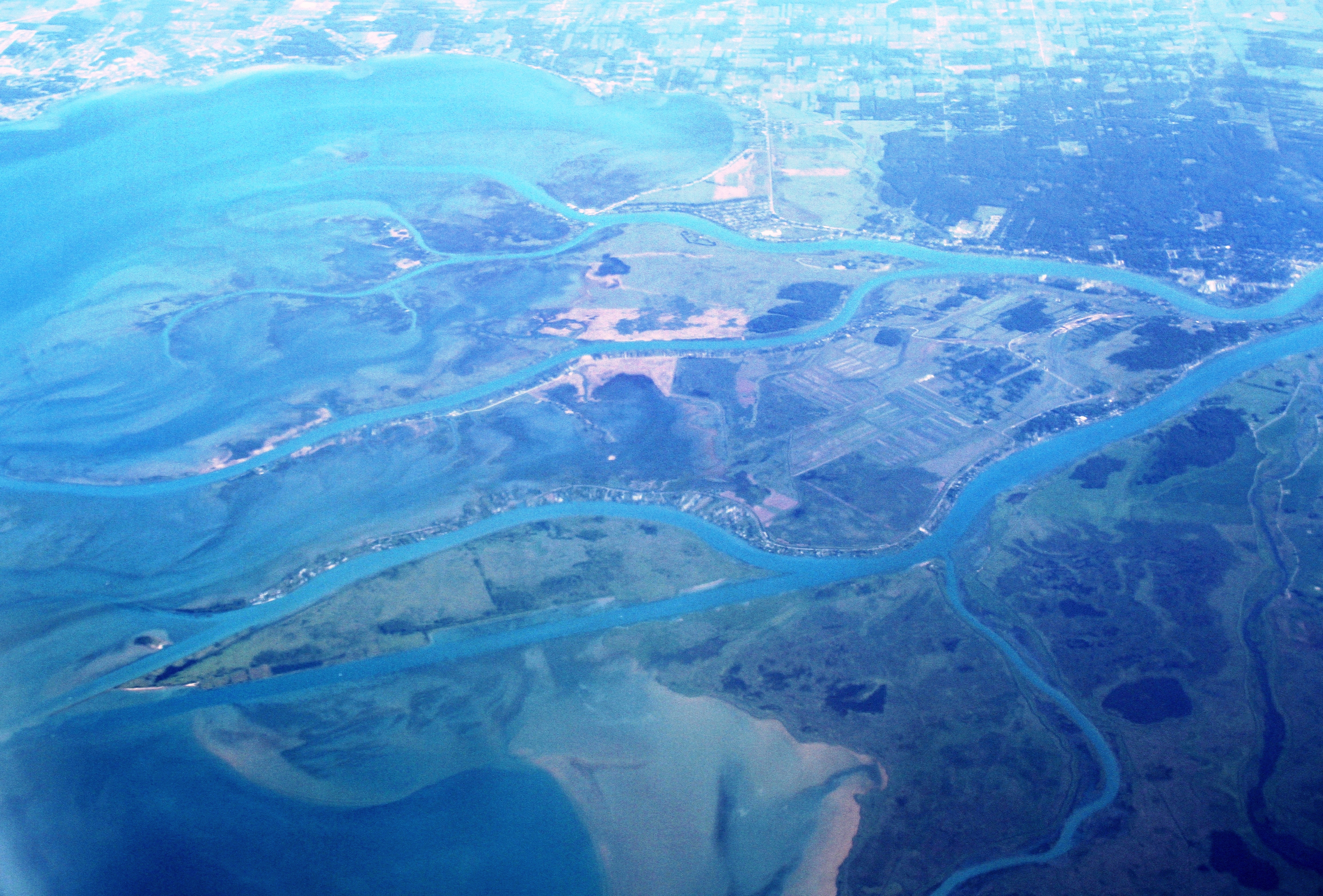
- Aerial view of Harsens Island (center)

- Location within Michigan

Geography
- Location: Mouth of the St. Clair River at Lake St. Clair
- Coordinates: 42°35′24″N 82°33′05″W

Administration
- United States
- State: Michigan
- County: St. Clair County
- Township: Clay Township

Harsens Island is a marshy island at the mouth of the St. Clair River on Lake St. Clair, in the U.S. state of Michigan. Politically, the island is in Clay Township of St. Clair County.

== History ==
The island was named for its first Euro-American settler, Jacob Harsen (sometimes referred to as "James"), son of Barnardus and Catharina Pruyn Harsen. He was a direct descendant of David Pieterse Schuyler of the New York Schuyler family and Wolfert Gerritse van Couwenhoven. Harsen migrated from Albany, New York in about 1779, during the American Revolutionary War, with his daughter Sara and son-in-law Isaac Gerrit Graveraet (or Graveret). Harsen bought the island from the local Native Americans in 1783. It was also known as "Jacob Island" (also James or Jacobus Island) as late as 1809. The name of the post office, Sans Souci, was changed to "Harsens Island" in 1960.

Great Britain and the United States disputed the island's jurisdiction for many years. The 1783 Treaty of Paris, which ended the American Revolutionary War, described the international boundary line with imprecise terms in several places, including the mouth of the St. Clair River. The area had not been surveyed at that time. In the most commonly known map of the area from that period, made by John Mitchell in 1755 and which was used in negotiating the treaty, the delta and all the islands at the mouth of the St. Clair River are absent.

According to the 1783 treaty, the boundary line was to run through the middle of Lake Erie until it arrives at the water communication between that lake and Lake Huron, "thence along the middle of said water communication into the Lake Huron". Due to this vagueness, all the delta islands, including Harsens and Dickinson, were claimed by the British. Some persons located in the new United States who did not want to renounce their status as British subjects following the war moved to make their residences there. The area was administered by the Hesse District of Upper Canada, which also awarded land grants in the islands. In 1809, surveyors for the British government placed the boundary line in the north channel, which placed all of the delta and islands under British control.

But, the 1814 Treaty of Ghent, which ended the War of 1812, acknowledged the ambiguity of provisions in the 1783 treaty:

And, whereas, doubts have arisen, what was the middle of the said river, lakes, and water communication, and whether certain islands lying in the same were within the dominions of his Britannic majesty, or of the United States." To decide these questions, two commissioners were to be appointed, one from each nation, to designate the international boundary. They executed their survey of the Detroit River, Lake St. Clair, and the St. Clair River in 1819 and 1820; and issued their final conclusions on June 18, 1822. Their decision regarding the St. Clair River delta was that the boundary should run north through Lake St. Clair, entering "that mouth or channel of the River St. Clair which is usually denominated the Old Ship Channel; thence along the middle of said channel, between Squirrel Island on the southeast, and Herson's [sic] Island on the northwest, to the upper end of the last mentioned island, which is nearly opposite to Point aux Chenes, on the American shore; thence along the middle of the River St. Clair, keeping to the west of, and near, the islands called Belle Riviere Isle, and Isle aux Cerfs, to Lake Huron.

By this definition, both Harsens and Dickinson islands were placed on the U.S. side of the boundary.

In 1870 a case arose involving Hiram Little of Wallaceburg, Ontario, a captain who was given a contract to provide cord wood and supplies to a work crew. At the time, a ship canal was being dredged through the marshy areas near Lake St. Clair. By this time shipping was increasing and the need for a deep, free-flowing canal was required. During one trip to the work area, Capt. Little's ship was seized by U.S. officials, who claimed he was operating illegally since he was in U.S. waters. Little protested, claiming he was in Canadian water, and challenged U.S. officials to prove their contention. After searching of documents, including contact with the Crown in England who supplied early charts of the area, Capt. Little was ultimately proven correct. To avoid further embarrassment, the U.S. officials moved the international boundary east, further infringing on Canadian (and First Nations) land.

The present St. Clair River, from Russell Island to Lake St. Clair, has been the international boundary line between Canada and the United States ever since. Some observers still disagree as to which nation should legally "own" Harsen's Island and the St. Clair delta area. The Walpole Island First Nation claims that Harsen's Island is unceded territory and properly belongs to them.

Harsens Island is the only U.S. island in the flats that can be reached by automobile ferry, and is the only one with roads and an unincorporated community, Sans Souci. The island community had a public school, which has closed and been replaced by a restaurant. Other tourist attractions include shops, an art gallery, and a small airport. All the other U.S. islands—there are scores of them—are accessible only by boat.

== Geography ==
The St. Clair River is an integral part of the Great Lakes, draining water from Lake Huron down into Lake St. Clair. Lake St. Clair then empties into the Detroit River, which flows into Lake Erie. The delta was formed about 6,000 years ago and long was a desired area of habitation by indigenous peoples.

The St. Clair River is the international boundary between the United States and Canada. The river carries more freighter traffic than the Suez and Panama Canals combined. Over 1 billion US gallons (3,800,000 m^{3}) of fresh water per day flow down the St. Clair River, and through its delta region, the St. Clair Flats.

Harsens Island is the major U.S. island in the Flats. The Canadian side of the Flats has the largest islands in the delta, including Walpole Island, which are among six islands controlled by the Walpole Island First Nation, made up of Ojibwa, Potawatomi, and Odawa peoples.

The St. Clair Flats supports a range of wildlife, such as the great blue heron, snapping turtles, watersnakes, muskrats, mink, whitetail deer, pintail, canvasback and mallard ducks, Canada geese and red-winged blackbirds. The area is a popular fishing spot, as yellow perch, large and small mouth bass, rock bass, carp, sunfish, pumpkinseed fish, bluegills, and silver bass are available. The State of Michigan owns about 75% of the area of Harsen's Island, and manages waterfowl and wildlife sanctuaries throughout.

== Bibliography ==
- Michael Dixon Books. Life at the Flats
- Michael Dixon Books. When Detroit Rode the Waves
- Romig, Walter. Michigan Place Names. Detroit: Wayne State University Press, 1986.
- Jenks, William Lee. St. Clair County, Michigan, its history and its people. Chicago and New York: The Lewis publishing company, 1912.
- Bkejwanong Walpole Island First Nation website @ http://www-personal.umich.edu/~ksands/Warpole.html
- Bielinski, Stefan. New York State Museum. Bernardus Harsen's bio (Jacob's father) "http://exhibitions.nysm.nysed.gov/albany/bios/h/beharsen8347.html"
- Bielinski, Stefan. New York State Museum. Jacob Harsen bio "http://exhibitions.nysm.nysed.gov/albany/bios/h/jaharsen8350.html"
- Bielinski, Stefan. New York State Museum. Catharina Pruyn Harsen's bio (Jacob's mother) "http://exhibitions.nysm.nysed.gov/albany/bios/p/capruyn.html"
- Bielinski, Stefan. New York State Museum. Jacob's mother's family bio "http://exhibitions.nysm.nysed.gov/albany/bios/p/pruyn.html"
- The Holland Society of New York Harsen archive name list. "http://www.hollandsociety.org/?s=harsen"
- The Pruyn House and family history. Jacobs Harsen's mother was a member of this family. https://www.pruynhouse.org
- Additional historical context about Isaac Graveraet and Jacob Harsen. https://tappingroots.com/2022/01/20/a-lovely-view-the-history-of-the-graveraet-and-harsen-families-of-harsens-island-michigan-part-one/
