= St. Clair River =

River in North America

Saint Clair River
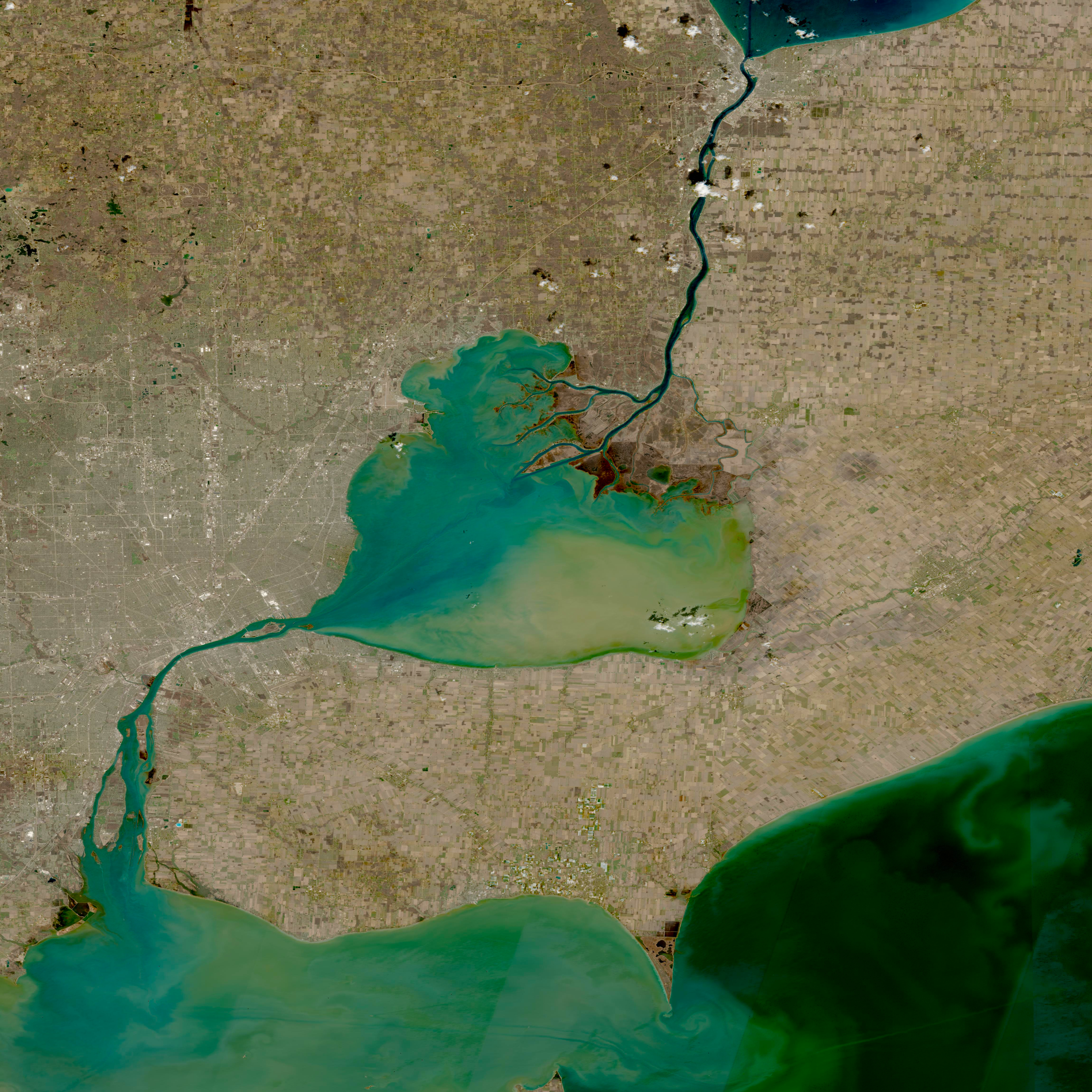
- Sentinel-2 satellite photo, showing Lake Saint Clair (center), as well as St. Clair River connecting it to Lake Huron (to the North) and Detroit River connecting it to Lake Erie (to the South)

Location
- Countries: Canada, United States

Physical characteristics
- Source
  - location: Lake Huron
- Mouth
  - location: Lake St. Clair
- Length: 40.5 mi (65.2 km)
- Basin size: 223,600 mi^{2} (579,000 km^{2})
- Discharge
  - average: 182,000 cu ft/s (5,200 m^{3}/s)

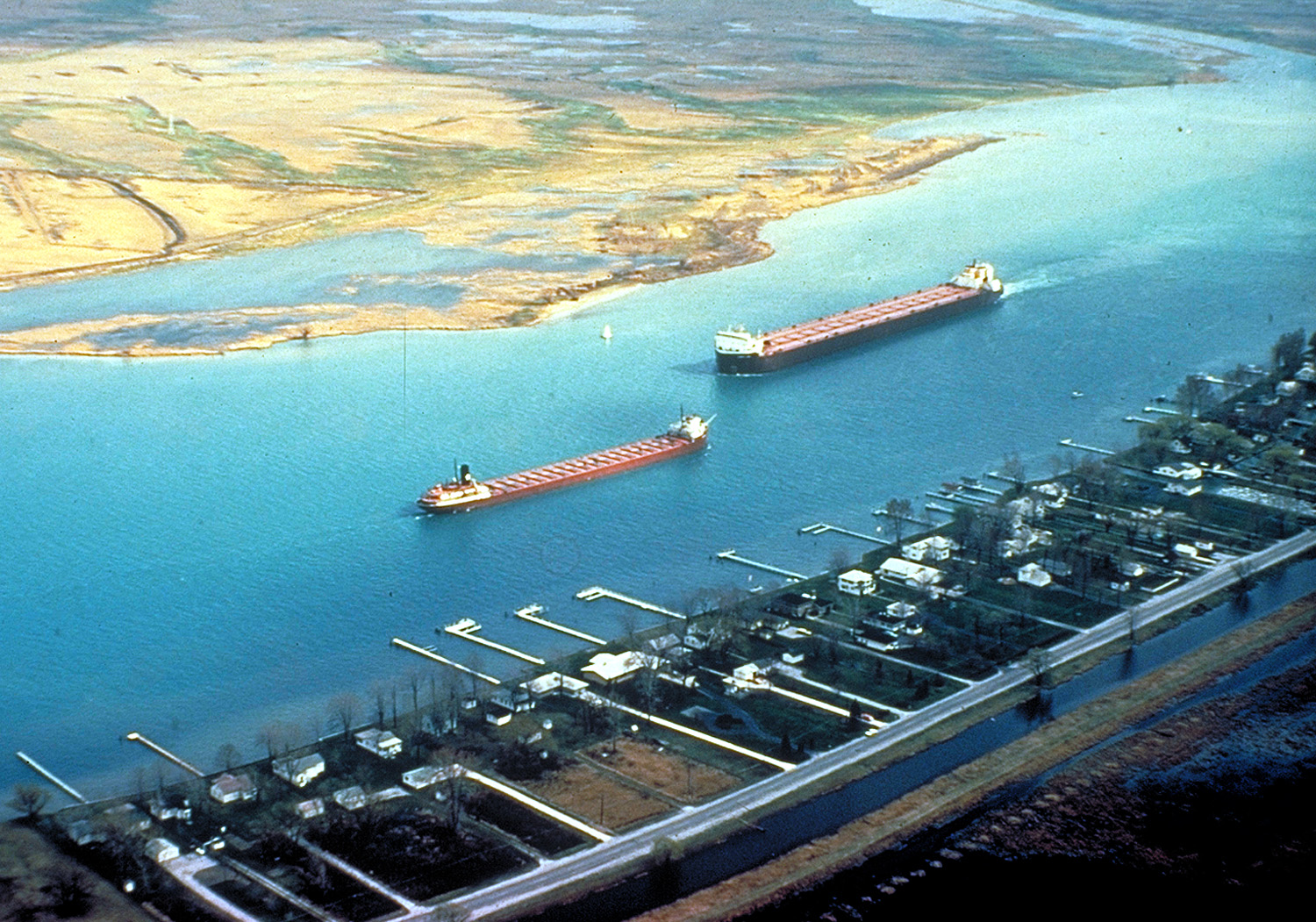
Great Lakes freighters navigating the lower St. Clair River. View is from the U.S. side, looking across to Canada.

The St. Clair River is a 40.5-mile-long (65.2 km) river in eastern North America that flows from Lake Huron into Lake St. Clair, forming part of the international boundary between Canada and the United States and between the Canadian province of Ontario and the U.S. state of Michigan. The river is a significant component in the Great Lakes Waterway, whose shipping channels permit cargo vessels to travel between the upper and lower Great Lakes. The St. Clair Delta is located at the mouth of the St. Clair River where it meets Lake St. Clair and is the largest delta in the Great Lakes system, covering approximately 140 square miles (360 km^{2}).

== Location ==
The river, which some consider a strait, flows southward, connecting the southern end of Lake Huron to the northern end of Lake St. Clair. Near its mouth at Lake St. Clair, it divides into three main channels; the North, Middle, and South Channels, forming the St. Clair Delta, also known as the St. Clair Flats. Like a strait, the river functions as a narrow waterway connecting two larger bodies of water.

== Size ==
The river is 40.5 miles (65.2 km) long and drops 5 feet (2 m) in elevation from Lake Huron to Lake St. Clair. The flow rate averages around 182,000 cubic feet per second (5,200 m^{3}/s), and the drainage area is 223,600 square miles (579,000 km^{2}). This takes into account the combined drainage areas of Lakes Huron, Michigan, and Superior.

== History ==
Generations of indigenous cultures traveled by canoe on the lakes and rivers in this area, carrying on trade across the region and continent.

In the 18th century, French voyageurs and coureurs des bois traveled on the river to trade with the Ojibwa and other regional Native Americans and transport furs in canoes to major posts of French and British traders, including Fort Detroit, built in 1701 downriver from Lake St. Clair on the Detroit River. European demand for American furs, especially beaver, was high until the 1830s.

During the mid-19th century and later, Port Huron and Marine City, Michigan, became major shipbuilding centers, especially the latter. Lumber harvested on The Thumb of Michigan was shipped downriver as log rafts to Detroit for processing and export both domestically and internationally. The wooden ships built along the river carried migrants and immigrants up the river and west through the upper Great Lakes on their way to new homes in the American West. Their farms later shipped out grain to eastern markets as part of the developing area.

Beginning in the late 19th century, iron ore mined in the Mesabi Range, copper and grain were carried east through the lakes by lake freighters, increasingly made of steel in the 20th century, traveled throughout the Great Lakes, transporting commodities such as iron ore from the Mesabi Range, copper, and grain, all products of settlers' labor. Iron was taken to Ashtabula, Ohio and other industrial cities for processing and steel manufacture, and grain was often shipped through to major eastern markets such as Cleveland and New York City.

From the late 19th century, lake steamers carried passengers and traveled among the small towns along the St. Clair and Detroit rivers, and around the Great Lakes. At one time 31 lines operated, but with the rise of automobile use in the 20th century, they gradually declined.

== Watersheds ==
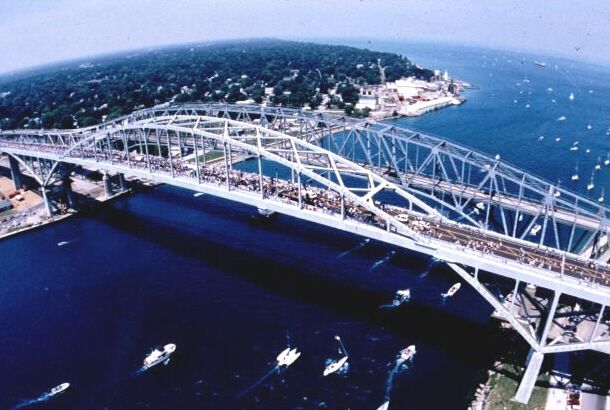
Head of river looking into Lake Huron, showing the twin Blue Water Bridge

The St. Clair River and its Lambton County tributaries in Ontario contribute 103,210 acres (41,770 ha) to the watershed. This figure does not include the Sydenham River watershed. In Michigan, the Black, Pine, and Belle rivers drain 780,600 acres (315,900 ha) in Lapeer, Macomb, Sanilac, and St. Clair counties; the watersheds around Bunce Creek and Marine City are relatively small.

== Islands ==
- Stag Island lies between Corunna, Ontario and Marysville, Michigan.
- Fawn Island is near Port Lambton, Ontario and Marine City, Michigan.
- Walpole, Seaway, Bassett, Squirrel, Pottowatamie, St. Anne, Dickinson, Russell and Harsens islands are located in the delta where the St. Clair River flows into Lake St. Clair near Algonac, Michigan. These islands are part of the "St. Clair Flats", the only major river delta in the Great Lakes. Six of the islands in this delta are unceded territory that are part of the Walpole Island First Nations, whose members include Ojibwe (Anishinaabe), Potowatomi, and Odawa peoples. They call this delta area Bkejwanong, meaning "where the waters divide".

== Land usage ==
Most of the watershed away from the river in Ontario and Michigan is used for agriculture. There were numerous sugar beet farms in the flatlands, and an annual beet market was held in Marine City, Michigan, for years at harvest time. Many of the 19th-century English immigrants to this area came from Lincolnshire, England, where sugar beets were a major commodity crop in the 19th and 20th centuries.

A few forest and wetland areas have survived. Their area has declined significantly since European-American settlement, clearing, and development of cultivated fields for various agricultural crops.

Much of the shoreline on both sides of the St. Clair River is urbanized and extensively industrialized. Intensive development has occurred in and near the adjacent cities of Port Huron, Michigan and Sarnia, Ontario, at the northern end of the river. The most dense concentration of industry, including a large petrochemical complex, lies along the Ontario shore south of Sarnia. Historically, Sarnia was founded as a fur trading post.

Several communities along the St. Clair rely on the river as their primary source of drinking water. About one-third to one-half of the residents of Michigan receive their water from the St. Clair/Detroit River waterway. Industries including petroleum refineries, chemical manufacturers, paper mills, salt producers, and electric power plants also need high-quality water for their operations. Since the late 20th century and passage of environmental laws to protect air and water quality, there have been occasional incidents when some of these industries have illegally contaminated river waters after discharging pollutants. Major clean-up activities were required.

== Land habitat ==
Land areas of the St. Clair River shoreline and flats consist of two biological zones: upland and transitional, both of which are normally above the water table, but which may be flooded periodically.

Forests in the region consist of a mix of deciduous species occurring in both upland and bottomland ecosystems, many of which lie near their northern climatic limit. Most pre-European settlement forests were cleared for agriculture, industry, or urbanization. Remaining stands include state imperiled wet-mesic flatwoods and globally imperiled lakeplain oak openings found within St. John’s Marsh State Wildlife Area, Dickinson Island, and Walpole Island. Remnants of globally imperiled lakeplain wet and wet-mesic prairie also persist in these areas. In addition to widespread industrialization and development, coastal wetlands along the shores of Lake St. Clair and the St. Clair Delta have been heavily degraded by invasive species, particularly European reed (Phragmites australis subsp. australis), narrow-leaved cattail (Typha angustifolia), and hybrid cattail (Typha x glauca).

Transitional species are abundant in the low-lying regions, categorized as shrub ecotones, wet meadows, sedge marshes, and island shorelines and beaches. This habitat is home to water and land mammals, including humans, as well as songbirds, waterfowl, insects, pollinators, reptiles, and amphibians.

== Water habitat ==
The aquatic habitat of the St. Clair River ranges from deep and fast near the Blue Water Bridge to shallow and slow in the lower river near its discharge point into Lake St. Clair.

Each area provides a unique habitat for aquatic life:

- macrophytes (visible marine plants),
- benthic macroinvertebrates (organisms that live at the bottom of a lake or stream),
- phytoplankton and zooplankton (floating plants and animals),
- emergent vegetation (plants seen above the water surface),
- fish (from minnows to large sport fish).

== Area of concern ==
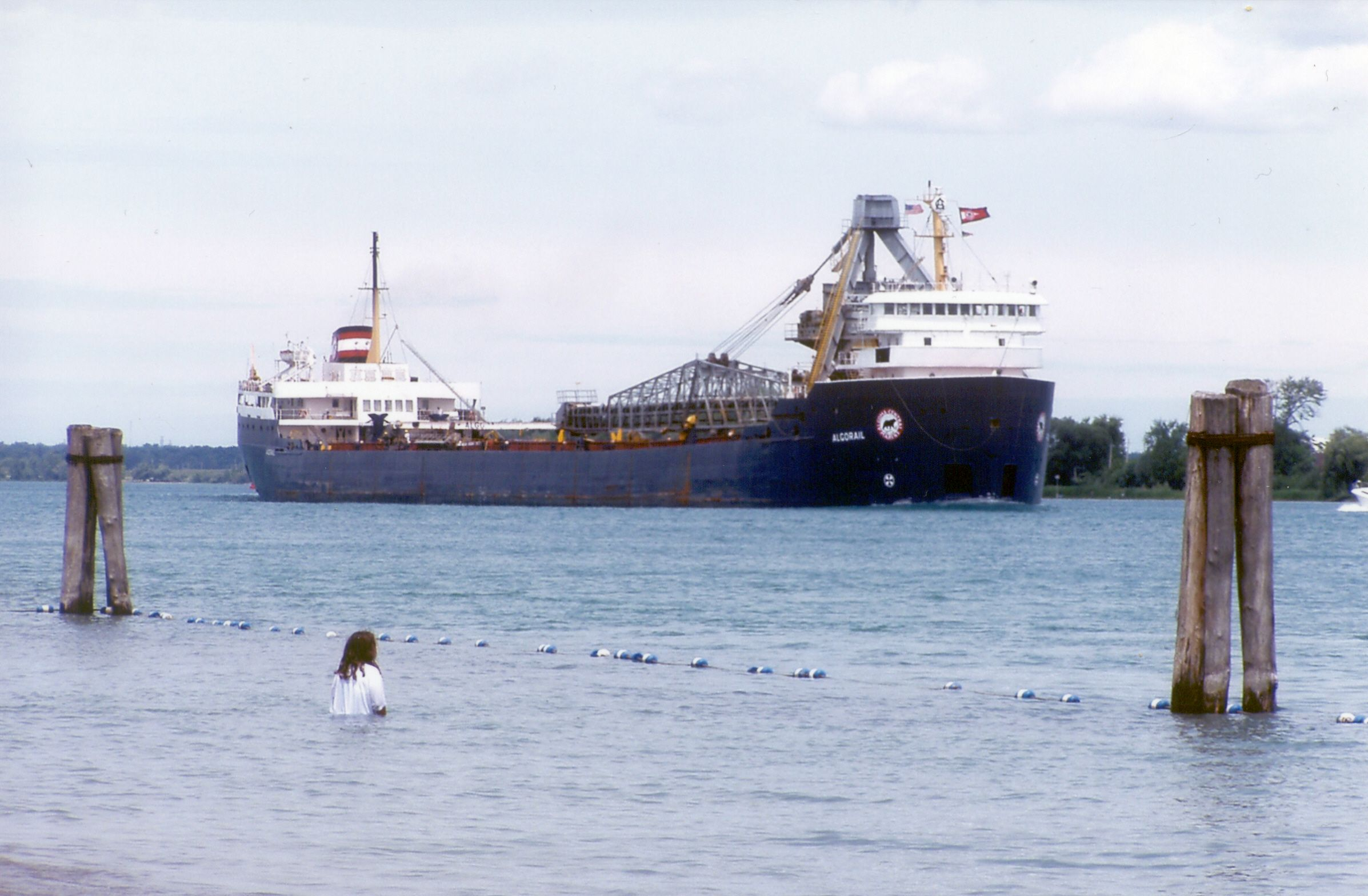
Canadian freighter Algorail downbound in the St. Clair River

The St. Clair River is a binational Area of Concern (AOC) that borders both the United States and Canada. An AOC is an area within the Great Lakes, that has suffered from environmental destruction. The St. Clair River has been considered an AOC because conventional pollutants such as bacteria, heavy metals, toxic organics, contaminated sediment, fish consumption advisories, impacted animal and plant life, and beach closings.

The United States found that 10 out of 14 of the beneficial use impairments (BUI) were impaired, which would lead to a $21 million investment from the Great Lakes Restoration Initiative. After several habitat projects, only two impairments exists: the Restrictions on Fish and Wildlife Consumption and the Restrictions on Drinking Water Consumption or Taste and Odor Problems.

=== Beneficial use impairments ===
A beneficial use impairment is a change within the physical, biological, and chemical consistency that causes significant environmental degradation. The St. Clair River has undergone several projects and clean up to remove the BUIs that affected the area. There are currently only 2 BUIs left on the St. Clair River, and once those 2 are removed, the river might go through the delisting process.

==== List of beneficial use impairments that has impacted the St. Clair River ====
- Restrictions on fish and wildlife consumption
- Restrictions on drinking water consumption, or taste and odor
- Tainting of fish and wildlife flavor – REMOVED 2010
- Restriction on dredging activities – REMOVED 2011
- Added costs to agriculture or industry – REMOVED 2012
- Degradation of aesthetics – REMOVED 2012
- Degradation of benthos – REMOVED 2015
- Beach closings – REMOVED 2016
- Bird or animal deformities or reproduction problems – REMOVED 2017
- Loss of fish and wildlife habitat – REMOVED 2017

=== Remedial action plan ===
==== Remediation and restoration work ====
The St. Clair River AOC includes the entire river, from the Blue Water Bridge at the north end, to the southern tip of Seaway Island, west to St. Johns Marsh and east to include the north shore of Mitchells Bay on Lake St. Clair. Anchor Bay is not included.

Through the Great Lakes Agreement, a Remedial Action Plan (RAP) was created to initiate cleanup measures. Its background report noted the adverse effects of pollution in the river and lakes:

- Restrictions on fish consumption
- Bird and animal deformities
- Degradation of benthos
- Restrictions on dredging activities
- Restrictions on drinking water consumption
- Beach closings
- Degradation of aesthetics
- Added cost to agriculture and industry
- Loss of fish and wildlife habitat

According to the Stage 1 Remedial Action Plan (RAP), the reasons for the Loss of Fish and Wildlife Habitat beneficial use impairment (BUI) in the St. Clair River were general loss of the aquatic plant community due to industrial, agricultural, recreational, and urban developments. A large blob of perchloroethylene was found at the bottom of the St Clair River due to runoff from Dow Chemical Corp in 1985. It remains there, slowly mixing with the water.

The RAP for the St. Clair River AOC was initiated in 1985. A bi-national group called the RAP Team, which included representatives from federal, state, and provincial governments of both Canada and the United States was established in 1987 to develop the plan and to ensure adequate and appropriate public involvement.

== Erosion and Great Lakes drainage ==
Federal officials have long acknowledged that dredging and riverbed mining in the St. Clair dropped the long-term average of Great Lakes Huron and Michigan by about 16 inches. A bi-national Great Lakes water-level study concluded in 2013 that unexpected erosion since the last major St. Clair dredging project in the early 1960s has dropped the lakes' long-term average by an additional 3 to 5 inches. Today, these lakes are nearly 2 feet lower than before human modifications to the riverbed of the St. Clair River. This record low has raised concerns about the long-term health of the lakes. Activists urge remediation to slow the flow of waters through the St. Clair River and out of the lake system, to restore former water levels. However, as of October 2020, the Lake Huron water is averaging 581.5 feet above sea level, which is considerably above the Datum of 577.5 feet, and above the Mean Long-Term Water Level of 578.8 feet.

== Crossings ==
This is a list of bridges and other crossings of the St. Clair River from Lake St. Clair upstream to Lake Huron.

Crossing	Carries	Location	Coordinates
Walpole Island Bridge	Municipal Road 32	Chatham-Kent Municipality and Walpole Island, Ontario (Crosses the Chenal Ecarte of the St. Clair)	42°35′34.4″N 82°28′27.7″W
Harsens Island Ferry	Cars and passengers	Algonac, Michigan and Harsens Island, Michigan (crosses the North Channel of the St. Clair)	42°36′57.4″N 82°33′38.9″W
Russell Island Ferry	Passengers only	Algonac, Michigan and Russell Island, Michigan	42°37′07.2″N 82°31′47.9″W
Walpole–Algonac Ferry	Cars and passengers	Algonac, Michigan and Walpole Island, Ontario	42°37′01.6″N 82°31′17.6″W
Sombra–Marine City (Bluewater) Ferry - Closed 2018	Cars and passengers	Marine City, Michigan and Sombra, Ontario	42°42′46.4″N 82°29′13.3″W
St. Clair Tunnel	Canadian National Railway	Port Huron, Michigan and Sarnia, Ontario	42°57′34.2″N 82°25′19.0″W
Blue Water Bridge	I-94 / I-69; Highway 402	Port Huron, Michigan and Sarnia, Ontario	42°59′55.1″N 82°25′23.9″W

== See also ==
- List of rivers of Ontario
- List of rivers of Michigan
- Blue Water River Walk
