= Anchor Bay High School =

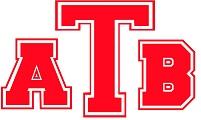

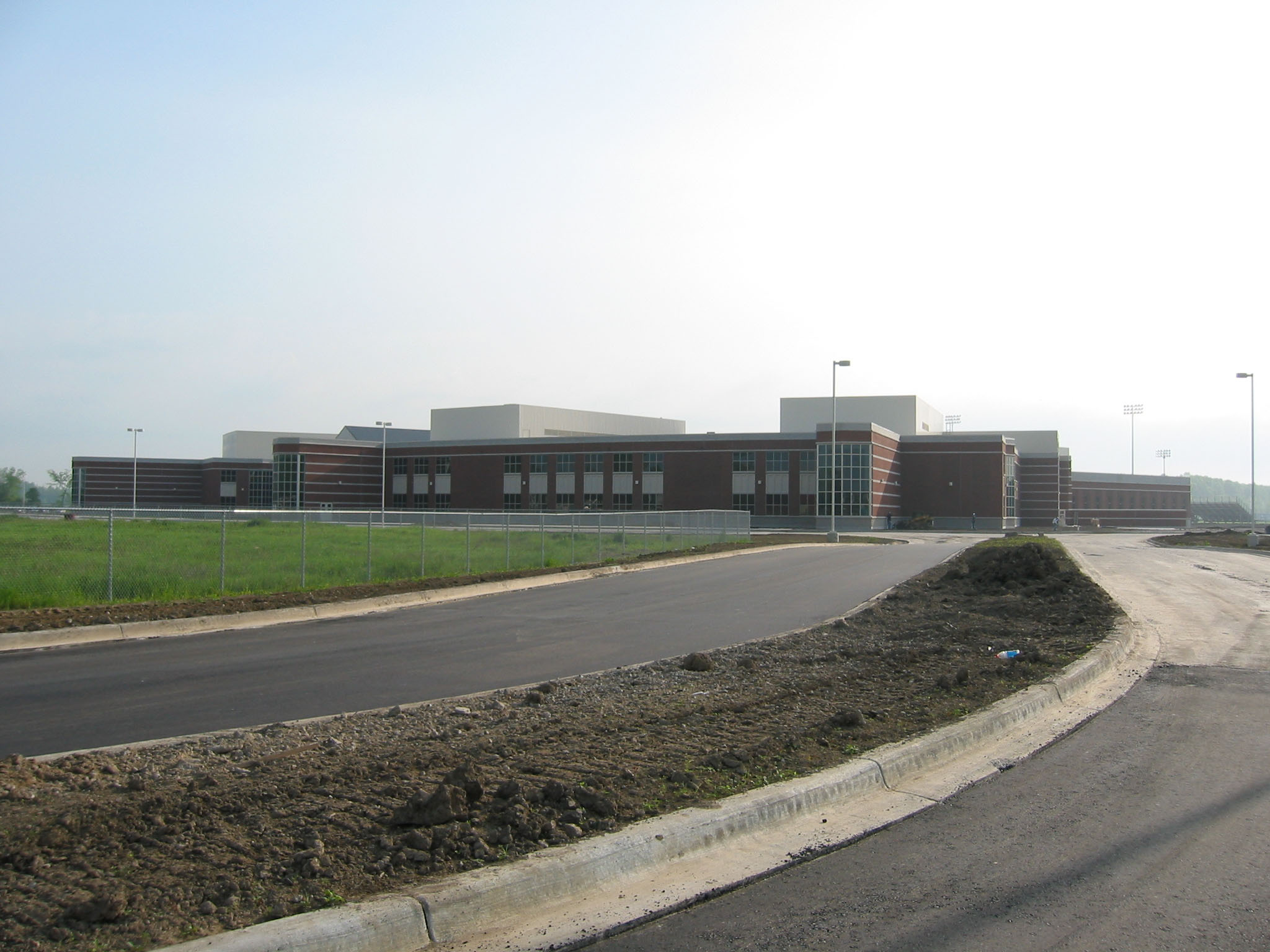

Location
- 6319 County Line Road; Fair Haven, Michigan 48023; United States
- Coordinates: 42°42′42″N 82°43′38″W

Information
- Type: Public high school
- School district: Anchor Bay School District
- Principal: Michael Mackenzie
- Teaching staff: 74.22 (on a FTE basis)
- Grades: 9–12
- Enrollment: 1,777 (2023–2024)
- Student to teacher ratio: 23.94
- Campus: Suburban
- Colors: Red & white
- Athletics conference: Macomb Area Conference
- Nickname: Tars
- Rival: L'Anse Creuse North High School, Dwight D. Eisenhower High School, Dakota High School, Romeo High School
- Accreditation: AdvancED
- Yearbook: The Anchor
- Website: anchorbat.msd.net

Anchor Bay High School is a four-year secondary school located in Fair Haven, Michigan (St. Clair County), United States. It is part of the Anchor Bay School District.

== History ==
The former high school in Chesterfield Township was converted to a middle school when the new high school opened at the beginning of the 2003–04 school year.

== Demographics ==
The demographic breakdown of the 1,938 students enrolled in 2014-15 was:

- Male - 49.6%
- Female - 50.4%
- Native American/Alaskan - 0.1%
- Asian/Pacific islanders - 0.9%
- Black - 3.4%
- Hispanic - 2.5%
- White - 89.7%
- Multiracial - 3.4%

23.9% of the students were eligible for free or reduced lunch.

== Athletics ==
The Anchor Bay Tars compete in the Macomb Area Conference. The school colors are red and white. The following MHSAA-sanctioned sports are offered:

- Baseball (boys)
- Basketball (girls and boys)
- Bowling (girls and boys)
- Competitive cheer (girls)
- Cross Ccuntry (girls and boys)
- Football (boys)
- Golf (boys)
- Ice hockey (boys)
- Lacrosse (boys)
- Soccer (girls and boys)
- Softball (girls)
- Swim and dive (girls and boys)
- Tennis (girls and boys)
- Track and field (girls and boys)
- Volleyball (girls)
- Wrestling (boys)

== Notable alumni ==
- Butch Hartman, cartoon animator
- Greg Janicki, professional soccer player
- Taiwan Jones, NFL linebacker
- Anthony Misiewicz, MLB pitcher
- Ken Pavés, celebrity hairstylist
- Kathleen Rose Perkins, actress
