= Taiwan Jones (linebacker) =

American football player (born 1993)

No. 49
- Position: Linebacker

Personal information
- Born: December 1, 1993 (age 32); New Baltimore, Michigan, U.S.
- Listed height: 6 ft 3 in (1.91 m)
- Listed weight: 252 lb (114 kg)

Career information
- High school: Anchor Bay (Fair Haven, Michigan)
- College: Michigan State
- NFL draft: 2015: undrafted

Career history
- New York Jets (2015–2016); Memphis Express (2019); Los Angeles Wildcats (2020); Michigan Panthers (2022)*
- * Offseason or practice squad member only

Awards and highlights
- Second-team All-Big Ten (2014)

Career NFL statistics
- Total tackles: 2
- Stats at Pro Football Reference

Taiwan Markis Jones (born December 1, 1993) is an American former professional football player who was a linebacker in the National Football League (NFL). He played college football for the Michigan State Spartans. Jones signed with the New York Jets as an undrafted free agent in 2015. The Michigan Panthers of the United States Football League (USFL) selected Jones with the 11th pick in the 21st round of the 2022 USFL draft.

== Early life ==
Jones attended Anchor Bay High School in Michigan. Jones was ranked as the 30th best linebacker by Rivals.com and was ranked the 57th ranked linebacker by Scout.com. Jones was selected to the PrepStar's All-Midwest Team. Jones was named to the all-state Division 1-2 first-team by The Detroit News and Associated Press. He was named to the all-county and all-conference teams in his senior season and also was named the Macomb Area Conference Blue Division MVP also in his senior season. Jones was a utility player at high school, where he played at running back, wide receiver and quarterback. Jones recorded 46 tackles and three interceptions in his 2010 season. Jones also played for the Anchor Bay basketball team in which he was a three-year starter. Jones was named an Associated Press Class A All-State honorable mention for the 2010–11 basketball season. He also named to the Detroit Free Press All-East Team in his senior season.

College recruiting
| Name | Hometown | School | Height | Weight | 40^{‡} | Commit date |
|---|---|---|---|---|---|---|
| Taiwan Jones; Outside linebacker | New Baltimore, Michigan | Anchor Bay | 6 ft 3 in (1.91 m) | 205 lb (93 kg) | -- | Mar 23, 2010 |
| Taiwan Jones; Outside linebacker | Recruit ratings: Scout: Rivals: | | | | | |
Overall recruit ranking: Scout: 57 (OLB) Rivals: -- National, 30 (OLB), 10 (Mich)
‡ Refers to 40-yard dash; Note: In many cases, Scout, Rivals, 247Sports, On3, and ESPN may conflict in their listings of height, weight and 40 time.; In these cases, the average was taken. ESPN grades are on a 100-point scale.; Sources: "Michigan State Football Commitments". Rivals.; "2011 Team Ranking". Rivals.com.

== Professional career ==
Pre-draft measurables
| Height | Weight | Arm length | Hand span | 40-yard dash | 10-yard split | 20-yard split | 20-yard shuttle | Three-cone drill | Vertical jump | Broad jump | Bench press |
|---|---|---|---|---|---|---|---|---|---|---|---|
| 6 ft 2 5/8 in (1.90 m) | 245 lb (111 kg) | 34 in (0.86 m) | 10 in (0.25 m) | 4.82 s | 1.70 s | 2.79 s | 4.33 s | 7.25 s | 33.5 in (0.85 m) | 9 ft 7 in (2.92 m) | 19 reps |
All values from NFL Combine/Pro Day

According to NFLDraftScout.com, Jones was projected to go in the fifth round in the 2015 NFL draft and his NFL comparisons were to NFL Linebacker Brandon Spikes and current Cincinnati Bengals linebacker Nico Johnson.

In May 2015, Jones signed with the New York Jets as an undrafted free agent following the conclusion of the 2015 NFL draft. On December 18, 2015, he was promoted to the active roster.

On September 3, 2016, he was released by the Jets as part of final roster cuts. He was re-signed by the Jets on October 26, 2016. He was released again by the Jets on November 22, 2016.

On April 1, 2019, Jones signed a contract to play with the Memphis Express of the Alliance of American Football, only to learn of the league's suspension of operations the following day.

In October 2019, Jones was selected by the Los Angeles Wildcats in the 2020 XFL draft's open phase. He had his contract terminated when the league suspended operations on April 10, 2020.
