= 9 P.M. =

9 P.M. or variants may refer to:

- A time on the 12-hour clock
- "9 PM (Till I Come)", 1999 song by German electronic dance music producer ATB
- "9:00 P.M." (The Pitt season 1), episode 15 from season 1 of The Pitt
- "9:00 P.M." (The Pitt season 2), episode 15 from season 2 of The Pitt
