= Home, James =

Home, James can refer to:

- Home, James (1928 film), a 1928 film
- Home, James (2013 film), a 2013 film
- Home James!, a British television comedy
