= Anchor Bay School District =

School district in Michigan

Address
- 5201 County Line Rd. Casco Twp., St. Clair, Michigan, 48064; United States
- Coordinates: 42°44′41″N 82°43′49″W

District information
- Type: Public
- Grades: PK–12
- Superintendent: Phil Jankowski
- Accreditation: North Central Association
- Schools: 11
- Budget: $87,683,000 (2022-23 expeditures)
- NCES District ID: 2602790

Students and staff
- Students: 5,334 (2024–2025)
- Teachers: 303.65 (2024-2025) FTE
- Staff: 667.91 (2024-2025) FTE
- Student–teacher ratio: 17.57 (2024-2025)

Other information
- Website: www.anchorbay.misd.net

Anchor Bay School District is a school district in Macomb County and St. Clair County, Michigan, serving New Baltimore and portions of the townships of Casco, Chesterfield, Ira, and Lenox.

The schools are accredited by Cognia.

== History ==
Several schools in the district were formerly Anchor Bay High School. Lighthouse Elementary once housed the high school. Anchor Bay Middle School North was then built as Anchor Bay High School. Its opening in fall 1966 was delayed one day by a late furniture delivery. Eleven years later, a new Anchor Bay High School opened in fall 1977. The architect was Harman, Tibedeau, Wedge and Associates. It became Anchor Bay Middle School South when it was replaced by the present building in 2003. The architect of the present high school was TMP Associates.

== Reconfiguration ==
As part of the bond issue passed in 2022, the high school is using the following career pathway tracks: 1. Engineering, natural science & agriculture, 2. Health & human services, 3. Arts & communication, and 4. Business & technology. Beginning in the 2025-2026 school year, elementary schools will serve grades kindergarten to four, Middle School North will serve grades five and six, and Middle School South will serve grades seven and eight.

== Schools ==
Schools in Anchor Bay School District
School	Address	Notes
High Schools
Anchor Bay High School	6319 County Line Rd, Fair Haven	Grades 9–12. Opened fall 2003.
Middle Schools
Anchor Bay Middle School North	52805 Ashley St., New Baltimore	Grades 5-6 (6-8 before 2025-26)
Anchor Bay Middle School South	48650 Sugarbush, New Baltimore	Grades 7-8(6-8 before 2025-26)
Elementary Schools
Ashley Elementary School	52347 Ashley, New Baltimore	K-4 (K-5 before 2025-26)
Francois Maconce Elementary School	6300 Church Rd., Ira Twp.	K–4 (K-5 before 2025-26)
Great Oaks Elementary School	32900 24 Mile Road, Chesterfield Twp.	K–4(K-5 before 2025-26)
Lighthouse Elementary School	51880 Washington St., New Baltimore	K–4 (K-5 before 2025-26)
Lottie M. Schmidt Elementary School	33700 Hooker, New Baltimore	K–4 (K-5before 2025-26)
Dean A. Naldrett Elementary School	47800 Sugarbush, New Baltimore	K–4 (K-5 before 2025-26)
MacDonald Early Childhood	5201 County Line Rd., Casco Twp.	preschool
Early Childhood Center & School Age Child Care	52680 Washington St., New Baltimore	preschool
Other Facilities
Aquatic Center	52401 Ashley, New Baltimore	
