= 8 P.M. =

8 P.M. and variations may refer to:

- A time on the 12-hour clock
- "8:00 P.M." (The Pitt season 1), episode 14 from season 1 of The Pitt
- "8:00 P.M." (The Pitt season 2), episode 14 from season 2 of The Pitt
