= Kathleen Rose Perkins =

American actress

- Born: November 15, 1974 (age 51); New Baltimore, Michigan, U.S.
- Education: Western Michigan University
- Occupation: Actress
- Years active: 2001–present
- Known for: Episodes 'Til Death

Kathleen Rose Perkins (born November 15, 1974) is an American actress.

== Life and career ==
Perkins was born in New Baltimore, Michigan, the daughter of Leonard and Donna Perkins. She graduated from Anchor Bay High School (1992) and enrolled in Western Michigan University, where she graduated with a degree in Musical Arts. Her passion for the theater blossomed when she got involved with the Anchor Bay school's performing arts club, which was headed by Joseph P. Abell.

Her career began in 2001 with a role in the television series The Fighting Fitzgeralds. She had a recurring role as Principal Duffy in the Fox sitcom 'Til Death and has made guest appearances in over 20 other television series, including NCIS: Los Angeles, Trust Me, Gary Unmarried, Tell Me You Love Me, Castle, The Game and The Exes, among others. Perkins also has appeared in several TV movies.

She had a starring role as Carol Rance in the BBC-Showtime comedy series Episodes. She plays the title character's mother in the Disney+ show Doogie Kameāloha, M.D.

== Filmography ==
=== Film ===
Year	Title	Role	Notes
2004	Burning Annie	Jen	
2005	Living 'til the End	Cynthia	
2010	10 Years Later	Miranda Miller-Huffman	
2012	The Pact	Liz	
2012	Cowgirls 'n Angels	Rebecca	
2013	Paradise	Amber	
2013	Enough Said	Fran	
2014	The Skeleton Twins	Carlie	
2014	Home, James	Anita Massie	
2014	A Short History of Decay	Shelly	
2014	Six Dance Lessons in Six Weeks	Susie	
2014	Gone Girl	Shawna Kelly	
2015	The Better Half	Calista / Cali Ryan	
2015	How Sarah Got Her Wings	Daphne	
2018	Almost Home	Linda	
2019	Walk. Ride. Rodeo.	Stacy	
2024	Almost Popular	Mrs. Quinn	

=== Television ===
Year	Title	Role	Notes
2001	The Fighting Fitzgeralds	Eliza	Episode: "The Easter Rebellion"
2003	Miss Match	Joanna	Episode: "The Love Bandit"
2003	Without a Trace	Amy Horton	Episode: "Coming Home"
2005	Suzanne's Diary for Nicholas	Kate Wilkinson	TV film
2005	Talk Show Diaries	Marion	TV film
2005	Living with Fran	Laurie	Episode: "The Reunion"
2005	Just Legal	Nadine Abbot	Episode: "The Limit"
2005	How I Met Your Mother	Marybeth	Episode: "The Limo"
2006	Four Kings	Phyllis	Episode: "Chest, Mate"
2006	Stacked	Zoey	Episodes: "The Third Date", "You're Getting Sleepy"
2006–2007	Help Me Help You	Jocelyn	Recurring role (4 episodes)
2008	Nip/Tuck	Tabitha Maloney	Episode: "Kyle Ainge"
2008	Eli Stone	Donna Milton	Episode: "One More Try"
2008	Grey's Anatomy	Sarah	Episode: "Piece of My Heart"
2008	Never Better	Claire	TV film
2008–2009	The Game	Faye	Recurring role (2 episodes)
2009	Trust Me	Amy	Recurring role (6 episodes)
2009	Gary Unmarried	Joan Plummer	Recurring role (4 episodes)
2009	Castle	Elise Finnegan	Episode: "Fool Me Once..."
2009	Married Not Dead	Christine	TV film
2009–2010	'Til Death	Ms. Duffy	Recurring role (12 episodes)
2009–2013	NCIS: Los Angeles	Coroner Rose Carlyle	Recurring role (5 episodes)
2010	The Mentalist	Willa Brock	Episode: "Rose-Colored Glasses"
2010	Law & Order: LA	Amy Powell	Episode: "Sylmar"
2011	Lie to Me	Colette Bradley	Episode: "Gone"
2011	Man Up!	Becky	Episode: "Letting Go"
2011	Private Practice	Jodi	Episode: "Remember Me"
2011–2017	Episodes	Carol Rance	Main role (40 episodes)
2012	Royal Pains	Lucy Walker	Episode: "A Farewell to Barnes"
2012	The Exes	Dr. Carol Thomas	Episode: "Analyze Them"
2013	The Gates	Helen Baxley	TV film
2013	Person of Interest	Vanessa Watkins	Episode: "Reasonable Doubt"
2015	Ballot Monkeys	Melanie Buck	
2015	The Millers	Miss Sparks	Episode: "Hero"
2015–2019	Fresh Off the Boat	Mey-Mey	6 episodes
2016	Abducted: The Jocelyn Shaker Story	Caitlin Shaker	TV film
2016	Code Black	Dr. Amanda Nolan	Recurring role, Season 2
2016–2017	Colony	Jennifer McMahon	11 episodes
2016–2017	You're the Worst	Priscilla	Recurring role, Seasons 3–4
2017–2018	American Housewife	Stacy Clouser	2 episodes (Season 2)
2019	Single Parents	Bobbi Babsen	2 episodes
2020	I Am Not Okay with This	Maggie	Main cast
2021	Big Shot	Miss Goodwin	Recurring (7 episodes)
2021–2023	Doogie Kameāloha, M.D.	Dr. Clara Hannon	Main role (20 episodes)
2025	Dexter: Original Sin	Barb Plimpton	Episode: "Blood Drive"
