= 9:00 P.M. (The Pitt season 1) =

- The Pitt episode
- Episode no.: Season 1 Episode 15
- Directed by: John Wells
- Written by: R. Scott Gemmill
- Cinematography by: Johanna Coelho
- Editing by: Mark Strand
- Production code: T76.10115
- Original air date: April 10, 2025
- Running time: 60 minutes

Guest appearances
- Shawn Hatosy as Dr. Jack Abbott (special guest star); Amielynn Abellera as Perlah; Jalen Thomas Brooks as Mateo Diaz; Brandon Mendez Homer as Donnie; Kristin Villanueva as Princess; Kayla Anjali as Georgia; Lesley Boone as Lena; Joanna Going as Theresa Saunders; Devon Gummersall as Larry Edwards; Ayesha Harris as Dr. Parker Ellis; Michael Hyatt as Gloria Underwood; Jackson Kelly as David Saunders; Ken Kirby as Dr. John Shen; Kerry Knuppe as Hillary Edwards; Aidan Laprete as Max Wilcox; Tedra Millan as Dr. Emery Walsh; Sarah Jane Morris as Janey; Taj Speights as Jake Malloy

Episode chronology
← Previous "8:00 P.M."	Next → "7:00 A.M."

"9:00 P.M." is the fifteenth episode and first-season finale of the American medical drama television series The Pitt. The episode was written by series creator R. Scott Gemmill, and directed by executive producer John Wells. It was released on Max on April 10, 2025.

The series is set in Pittsburgh, following the staff of the Pittsburgh Trauma Medical Hospital ER (nicknamed "The Pitt") during a 15-hour emergency department shift. The series mainly follows Dr. Michael "Robby" Robinavitch, a senior attending still reeling from some traumas. In the episode, the staff prepares for final arrangements as Gloria dictates that they must go home and leave their duties to the night shift.

The episode received critical acclaim, with critics praising the performances, emotional tone, writing, pacing and closure to the season. Noah Wyle, Katherine LaNasa and Shawn Hatosy submitted the episode to support their Emmy nominations for Outstanding Lead Actor in a Drama Series, Outstanding Supporting Actress in a Drama Series and Outstanding Guest Actor in a Drama Series, respectively, with all winning.

== Plot ==
Robby (Noah Wyle) intercepts McKay's (Fiona Dourif) arrest and talks to the police officers. After informing them that deactivating the ankle monitor allowed McKay to save one of their officers, she is released from police custody. Subsequently, he checks on King (Taylor Dearden) and Shen (Ken Kirby), informing Flynn's parents that their son needs a lumbar puncture. When Mrs. Edwards refuses, Robby takes the father to the morgue to make the point that his son can still be saved, but the father instead walks out in disgust.

After being reprimanded again by Robby, Langdon (Patrick Ball) asks Dana (Katherine LaNasa) to support him, but is surprised when she reveals that she is considering resigning. Langdon tells Robby that he stole doses to calm his withdrawal symptoms and feared seeing a doctor as he could lose his license. When Robby tells him that he needs to seek help, Langdon tells him that a night shift nurse saw his panic attack. McKay has a private conversation with David (Jackson Kelly), telling him that whatever he had intended for his "hit list", he must get help and that this is his one chance to turn his life around; although initially unsure whether she had gotten through to him, McKay later sees him talking to a psychiatrist as she is on her way home. Flynn's father decides to proceed with the lumbar puncture when his wife leaves the room. When she returns, she gets upset with her husband, although King manages to complete the puncture in time. Dana tells Robby that the police have arrested Doug Driscoll, the patient who attacked her, and he encourages her to press charges.

Despite the interns wanting to continue their shifts, Gloria (Michael Hyatt) orders them to go home and leave their duties to the night shift. Santos (Isa Briones) discloses to a patient that one of her friends took her own life after they were taken advantage of by an older man and her honesty convinces him to talk about his suicidal thoughts with a professional. Despite initially wanting to keep working, the events of the day finally catch up with Mohan (Supriya Ganesh), who briefly breaks down in the bathroom before composing herself. Before everyone leaves, Robby delivers a speech condemning the mass shooting and praising his colleagues for their work through the day. Dana consoles Robby when he stares at a memorial, explaining that Adamson's death could not be prevented in any way. As they leave, Santos notices Whitaker (Gerran Howell) heading to an unused wing of the hospital and follows him. She finds that he is sleeping there as he does not have a house or car. She offers him to stay with her for a while rent-free in exchange for cleaning, which he accepts. Mateo (Jalen Thomas Brooks) invites Javadi (Shabana Azeez) to the park after work for some drinks to decompress, which she accepts.

Robby tries to talk with Jake (Taj Speights), but he brushes him off, telling him he is not his father. A shaken Robby subsequently informs Leah's parents of their daughter's death, devastating them. At the rooftop, Robby and Abbott (Shawn Hatosy) have a conversation, in which Robby confesses to his panic attack. Abbott consoles him, explaining that he did a great job. They then leave for the day, planning to go for a drink with a few colleagues at the park. There, it is revealed that Abbott is using a prosthetic leg. As they make a toast, they see an ambulance approaching the hospital. Robby decides to leave, telling them "tomorrow is another day."

== Production ==
=== Development ===
The episode was written by series creator R. Scott Gemmill, and directed by executive producer John Wells. It marked Gemmill's sixth writing credit, and Wells' second directing credit.

=== Writing ===
Regarding the ending, where it is revealed that Abbott lost his leg during military service and is now using a prosthetic leg, Gemmill said, "We wanted to make Abbott a vet, and his experience in those scenarios, those situations, inform him somewhat as a doctor." The writers wanted to first show Abbott's development as doctor, before dropping the reveal in the final scene, "we didn’t want to make a big deal about it. It was just to show that, you know, so that nobody judged him ahead of time. And at the end, it's a big, hopefully a good reveal, and you realize it has never slowed him down one bit." Shawn Hatosy said, "He's clearly got something buried that he's dealing with. Compared to what Dr. Robby is going through, it is a perfect dynamic and balance. When things go wrong for Robby, he has somebody there who is also capable of leading, but is also somebody that Dr. Robby can lean on."

Gemmill also said that Langdon and Robby both would try to fix their respective problems, "I think that that relationship can be repaired. It's going to take some time, and with the nature of our show, it's a little bit tough, because we're only showing that relationship over 15 hours. You can only do so much in 15 hours." Isa Briones liked that Santos never got to confront Langdon in the finale, "There is not some big retribution moment or anything. It's what it is like to have conflicts with people at work. We had to band together and get this job done. It was insane. It's also not her job to oversee that. She uncovered something and now she's on her own journey." She also felt content with Santos' development by the end of the episode, adding "First days are always an impactful thing in our lives. We're always going to leave the first day of something feeling different and being changed in some way."

=== Filming ===
The scenes in the park were filmed in Pittsburgh at a park across Allegheny General Hospital. The conversation between Robby and Abbott on the rooftop was filmed in the hospital as well. The rooftop scene was shot in September 2024, on the same day the series filmed the rooftop scene from the first episode. Despite having scripts ready, they still did not decide on a reason for why Robby was on the ledge, explaining that "We make references to Robby having given a speech that had not been written [...] it was more excitement that the puzzle pieces all fit, and when we put that [scene] in, it actually felt earned, and in continuity with everything we've done. That felt really gratifying."

== Critical reception ==
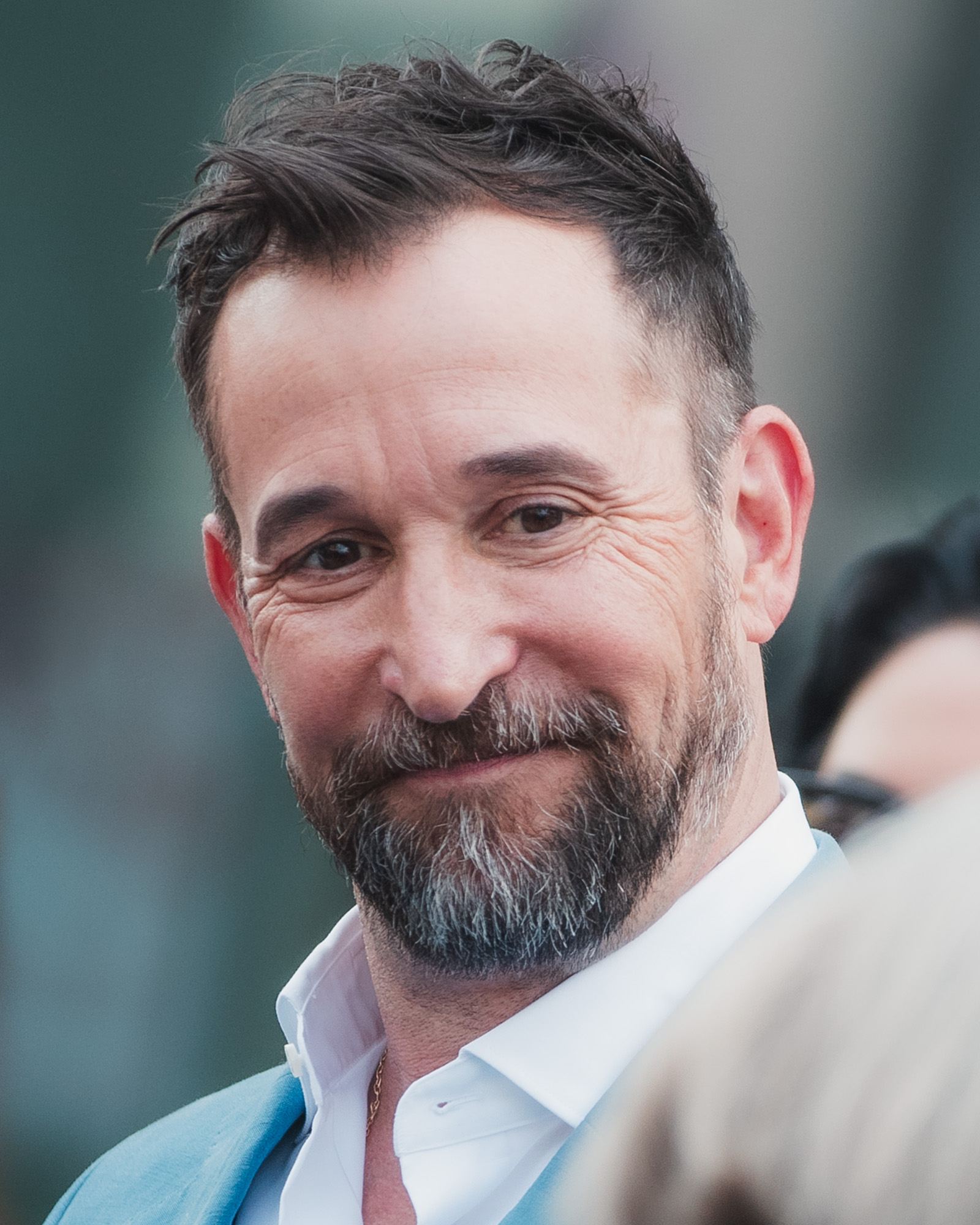
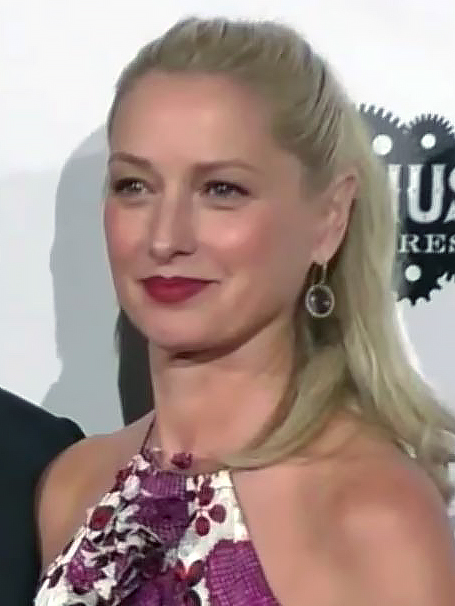
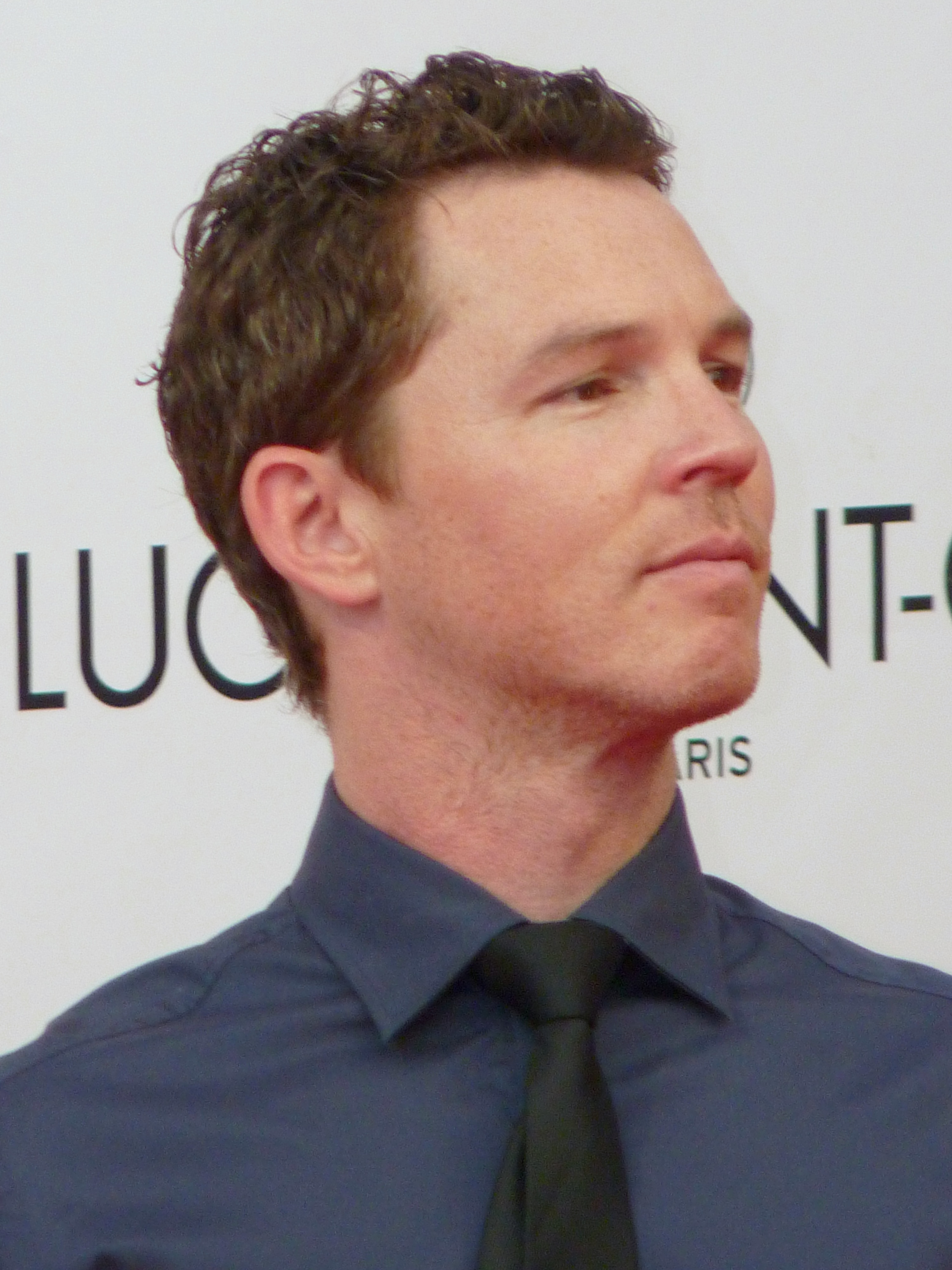
Noah Wyle, Katherine LaNasa and Shawn Hatosy's performances received critical acclaim, and won the Emmys for Outstanding Lead Actor in a Drama Series, Outstanding Supporting Actress in a Drama Series and Outstanding Guest Actor in a Drama Series respectively.

"9:00 P.M." received critical acclaim. Laura Bogart of The A.V. Club gave the episode an "A" grade and wrote, "In the premiere, he carried a determination not to be undone by the ghosts of the day his mentor died. Now, he walks away with new ghosts that—no matter how stubborn, smart, or gifted he is—he will never be able to forget. This image is a perfect testament to everything that has made The Pitt such a reward to watch and a word-of-mouth phenomenon in a time when so many medical dramas are trying to be the next Grey's Anatomy."

Maggie Fremont of Vulture gave the episode a perfect 5 star rating out of 5 and wrote, "'9:00 P.M.' is about as satisfying a finale a show like this could deliver. I am reveling in the wonderful television we've been treated to in this episode, and all season long." Brady Langmann of Esquire wrote, "By now, it's no secret that The Pitt tackled every problem that is facing America right now, but the finale tries to answer a remarkably simple question: Why do healthcare workers choose to work in healthcare?"

Kristen Baldwin of Entertainment Weekly gave the episode a "B+" grade and wrote, "It was a little jarring to see the doctors and nurses outside of the hospital in the finale's final scenes. After just 15 episodes, I'm almost pathologically attached to these characters, thanks to Gemmill and The Pitt's outstanding ensemble." Nick Bythrow of Screen Rant wrote, "The Pitt episode 15 provided a fitting finale for Robby and his fellow doctors, fully encompassing a day in the lives of those working at the busy trauma hospital. With plenty of setup for season 2 and a satisfying close to this first chapter, the finale's realism and character moments made it a strong way to finish up the day."

Judy Berman of Time wrote, "A resident tells an intern she's running on adrenaline and bound to crash. 'This job can't be your life,' one doctor says to another. Yet the waiting room, which was cleared while the ER treated PittFest casualties, is already full of people in dire need of medical attention. As much as these doctors and nurses have earned a good night's rest, they're also painfully aware that their work will never be done." Lili Loofbourow of The Washington Post wrote, "A show like this one needed the final episode to explore the aftermath of the emergency. In filming the ensemble as they transition out of crisis into disoriented calm, The Pitt takes particular care to show people seeing—and people not being seen."

Jasmine Blu of TV Fanatic gave the episode a 4.9 star rating out of 5 and wrote, "If you're anything like me, you’re not ready to let go of this series yet. Like Mohan, after getting placed in the most chaotic, immersive experience ever, my adrenaline is still racing, and I'm [not] remotely ready for the comedown." Johnny Loftus of Decider wrote, "You are a character on The Pitt, or you are a viewer of The Pitt. Either way, it's been an extremely harrowing, occasionally terrifying, profoundly sad, and sometimes incredibly joyful real-time ride. With many of these emotions occurring simultaneously. So how does an ice-cold can of Iron City sound? We all deserve it."
