= 8:00 P.M. (The Pitt season 1) =

- The Pitt episode
- Episode no.: Season 1 Episode 14
- Directed by: John Cameron
- Written by: Simran Baidwan
- Cinematography by: Johanna Coelho
- Editing by: Joey Reinisch
- Production code: T76.10114
- Original air date: April 3, 2025
- Running time: 45 minutes

Guest appearances
- Shawn Hatosy as Dr. Jack Abbott (special guest star); Amielynn Abellera as Perlah; Jalen Thomas Brooks as Mateo Diaz; Brandon Mendez Homer as Donnie; Kristin Villanueva as Princess; Kayla Anjali as Georgia; Lesley Boone as Lena; Brad Dourif as Mr. McKay; Joanna Going as Theresa Saunders; Ayesha Harris as Dr. Parker Ellis; Robert Heaps as Chad Ashcroft; Michael Hyatt as Gloria Underwood; Jackson Kelly as David Saunders; Ken Kirby as Dr. John Shen; Aidan Laprete as Max Wilcox; Tedra Millan as Dr. Emery Walsh; Sarah Jane Morris as Janey; Skyler Stone as Buster Pirelli; Tracy Vilar as Lupe Perez; Bethany Walls as Whitney Rivera; Kerry Knuppe as Hillary Edwards; Taj Speights as Jake Malloy

Episode chronology
← Previous "7:00 P.M."	Next → "9:00 P.M."

"8:00 P.M." is the fourteenth episode of the American medical drama television series The Pitt. The episode was written by executive producer Simran Baidwan, and directed by John Cameron. It was released on Max on April 3, 2025.

The series is set in Pittsburgh, following the staff of the Pittsburgh Trauma Medical Hospital ER (nicknamed "The Pitt") during a 15-hour emergency department shift. The series mainly follows Dr. Michael "Robby" Robinavitch, a senior attending still reeling from some traumas. In the episode, Robby tries to regain his senses to continue his duties, while Abbott helps Mohan with a risky procedure. The staff is also informed of the identity of the mass shooter.

The episode received critical acclaim, with praise towards the slower nature of the episode, directing, performances and ending.

== Plot ==
Whitaker (Gerran Howell) arrives at the makeshift morgue in search of blankets and is surprised to find Robby (Noah Wyle) alone, tearfully reciting the Shema. Whitaker convinces Robby that they need him, although it takes a few moments before Robby composes himself.

A man, Brian, crashes his car in the parking lot; he was injured during the shooting but stayed to help as many people as possible, bringing an unconscious victim in the car. Alongside Ellis (Ayesha Harris), Langdon (Patrick Ball) and Santos (Isa Briones) treat the victim, later revealed to have overdosed, despite the tension between them. Brian has also developed an air embolism in his heart, and Mohan (Supriya Ganesh) cooperates with Abbott (Shawn Hatosy) to save him. Abbott helps Mohan to proceed with a risky procedure, despite Dr. Walsh (Tedra Millan) wanting to get Brian to a hyperbaric chamber. McKay (Fiona Dourif) ignores a phone call from the Allegheny County Courthouse and temporarily leaves her duty to meet with her father (Brad Dourif), who has come to pick up Harrison. Noticing Chad (Robert Heaps), Mr. McKay insults him. Mateo (Jalen Thomas Brooks) debriefs on the events of the day with Javadi (Shabana Azeez) and expresses his admiration for her work.

Gloria (Michael Hyatt) informs the staff that SWAT has already found the shooter, who committed suicide near a river. SWAT has also cleared the venue, indicating that there are no more victims on the way. With security releasing David (Jackson Kelly), Robby and McKay question him. David becomes aggressive when he finds that he must stay 72 hours under surveillance and is not allowed to see his mother. Theresa (Joanna Going) finally sees her son and shocks him by revealing that she agreed to the psychiatric hold, as she felt distressed by the victims of the shooting and was concerned after she was unable to get in contact with him. Refusing to speak to any professionals, David tells his mother to get out of the room, and Robby informs McKay that she is responsible for David being brought in by the police and must make things right. Langdon talks with Jake (Taj Speights), telling him Robby did everything he could to save Leah. Jake's mother Janey (Sarah Jane Morris) also arrives at the hospital to pick him up and has a conversation with Robby, encouraging him not to blame himself. After reuniting a patient with her daughter, King (Taylor Dearden) briefly breaks down, but is reassured by Robby that she is a great doctor.

An unresponsive minor, Flynn, and his sister Georgia are brought to the Pitt. Dr. Shen (Ken Kirby) and King try to treat his sepsis and pneumonia, but struggle to make further progress until Robby diagnoses him with the measles and potentially acute disseminated encephalomyelitis. When Flynn's mother Hillary Edwards (Kerry Knuppe), relying on half-understood health information on the Internet, refuses to allow a lumbar puncture to test for ADEM, Robby loses his temper with her and storms off. He then runs into Whitaker and thanks him for helping him earlier. They reflect on using their faith to help them cope with difficult times, and Whitaker repeats some of Robby's earlier advice back to him about learning to live with and accept the hardships of being a physician. Abbott speaks to Dana, and they discuss their concerns about Robby's mental health. Two police officers arrive, looking for McKay. When she confirms that she tampered with her ankle monitor, which would not stop beeping, the police arrest her.

== Production ==
=== Development ===
The episode was written by executive producer Simran Baidwan, and directed by John Cameron. It marked Baidwan's third writing credit, and Cameron's second directing credit.

=== Writing ===
On the scene where Whitaker convinces Robby to compose himself and return to his duties, Noah Wyle said, "The only thing that he can think of to do is to recite a very simple and basic prayer. And that's when Whitaker finds him — somebody who's on the opposite end of the professional spectrum. Different faith, different age. Watching those two guys try and negotiate this moment that was private and is now public was a really interesting and fun thing to play." Gerran Howell added, "any win for Whitaker is very satisfying for me, because he's been through it. Outside of how Whitaker is doing and how capable he is as a doctor, this is where you see him step up and just be there for a person. He has value in this moment, and in mirroring Robby's words back to him."

Wyle mentioned that the writers wanted the audience to suspect that David could be the mass shooter, as "that was to underscore the storyline that we really wanted to explore with David's character, which is about misunderstanding at every level. Trying to connect, but missing crucial moments when that connection really needs to be in place. Otherwise, it can trigger suspicion, paranoia, panic, over-involvement, lapse in judgment — all sorts of things happen in the wake of our bias, our misinterpretation and our misunderstanding of David's behavior."

Regarding McKay's reactions to David's storyline, which culminates in "8:00 P.M.", Fiona Dourif stated, "David is a representation of McKay’s history and what could possibly happen with my son, you know? I think I made a series of bad decisions. There was this point when you’re around that age where you feel invincible and you don’t understand the repercussions of your actions. It was trying to do my best to guide him to not ruin his life. You know, and having a second chance that I had." Speaking on McKay's arrest at the conclusion of the episode, Dourif explained, "I think the primary feelings were humiliation, utter humiliation, and then rage, rage at the injustice and absurdity of that situation and the fact that it was happening in front of everybody. It was a shotgun at the end of the longest day of your life. It's a mixed metaphor, but you know what I mean."

=== Casting ===
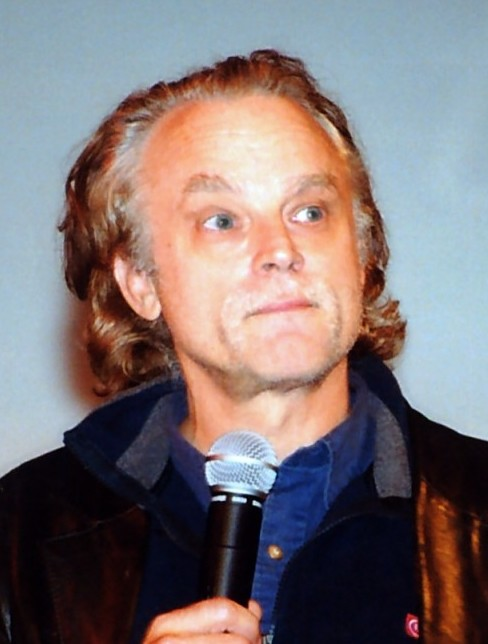
Brad Dourif guest stars in the episode.

A week before the episode aired, it was confirmed that Brad Dourif would make a guest appearance in the episode. Fiona Dourif suggested that Noah Wyle might have come up with the idea, as the writers considered ways to get Harrison out of the hospital. Episode writer Simran Baidwan met with Fiona about offering the role of McKay's father to her real-life father, and they were delighted. Fiona commented, "It was just pure pride. I had pride pumping through my body because he's a very special person and a brilliant actor. We really trust each other. I could just look at him and the dynamic is there. I don't think I was nervous. I was just delighted."

== Critical reception ==
"8:00 P.M." received critical acclaim. Laura Bogart of The A.V. Club gave the episode an "A" grade and wrote, "One of the great assets of The Pitt's episodic structure is the way that time continues to compound, with the effects of every moment felt acutely even after the immediate crisis has subsided. There is no quick shift to Dr. Robby. He is still in that pediatric room and broken over all the death he experienced that day—and all the days that came before it. He is always in the room. He may never get out of it."

Alan Sepinwall wrote, "It's a smart choice to have Whitaker be the one to pull Robby out of his panic attack. He's been shown throughout the season to have strong people skills. But he's also inexperienced enough—and knows he's inexperienced enough—that he can't give a traditional, melodramatic pep talk. All he can do is point out how badly the whole team needs him right now, given the stakes. That bluntness is enough to shake Robby out of his PTSD and back to work."

Maggie Fremont of Vulture gave the episode a 4 star rating out of 5 and wrote, "Even Mr. Iced Coffee can tell something is wrong. Robby is still ranting, though: 'They want medical treatment but they don't want medical advice? What the fuck are we doing?' You can feel the frustration jump off the screen and the anger is warranted, but still, you have to wonder if Robby will ever be able to rein it in again on this shift. He's got an hour to try." Brady Langmann of Esquire wrote, "Did you forget that The Pitt is, in fact, a TV show that aims to entertain? (I mean this as a total compliment, but I feel like we've been watching a documentary over the past two weeks.) One of The Pitt's long-running bits—Dr. McKay's legal woes—finally pay off this episode when the police put her in custody. Why, you ask? Because she dared to stop her ankle monitor's incessant beeping in the middle of a mass casualty event."

Nick Bythrow of Screen Rant wrote, "With one last hour remaining, The Pitt episode 14 offered a strikingly calmer penultimate episode contrasted with many of the more high-stakes installments in the series. But the events it sets up—from Robby confronting his feelings to McKay getting arrested—illustrate just how multifaceted and unpredictable the season finale is going to be." Jasmine Blu of TV Fanatic gave the episode a 4.5 star rating out of 5 and wrote, "Overall, it was a great hour to recover from the frantic shooting, which leaves me wondering what might be in store for the final hour."

Johnny Loftus of Decider wrote, "There is only one episode—hour—left of The Pitt, and watching these characters anticipate the end of their harrowing shift is making us have feelings. We've never said this before about a series: we'll miss them." Gabriela Burgos Soler of Telltale TV wrote, "The Pitt handles the passing of time so well that it feels like we have been clocking in for a shift at the ER for the past fourteen weeks, or hours in The Pitt world. The dread of an hour not going by fast enough or that it passes too quickly has never been represented more accurately."
