= Marshall Bell =

American actor

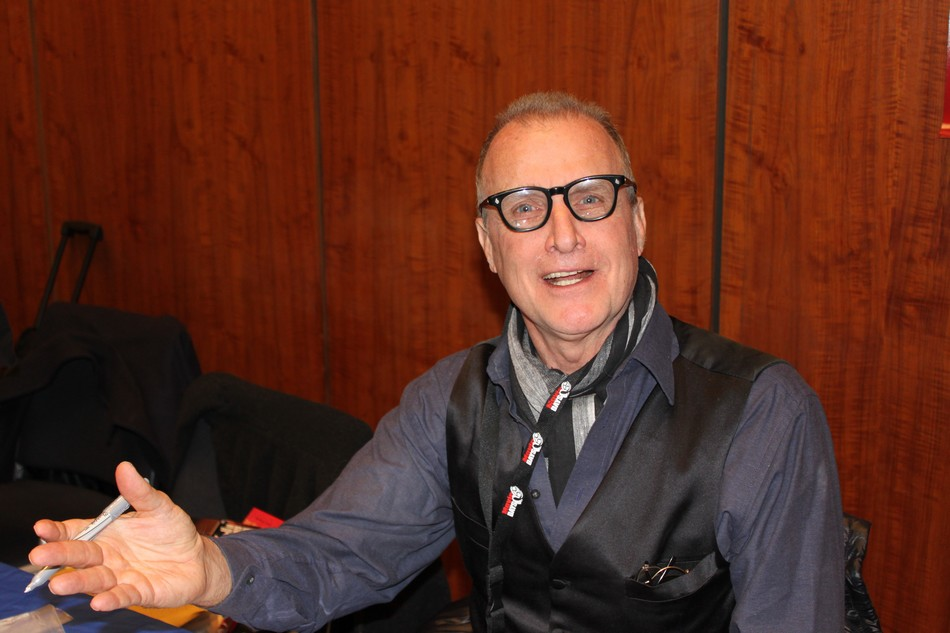
- Bell in 2009
- Born: Archibald Marshall Bell; September 28, 1942 (age 84); Tulsa, Oklahoma, U.S.
- Occupation: Actor
- Years active: 1984–present
- Spouse: Milena Canonero (m. 1980)

Archibald Marshall Bell (born September 28, 1942) is an American character actor. He has appeared in many character roles in movies and television. He is known for roles in A Nightmare on Elm Street 2: Freddy's Revenge (1985), Stand by Me (1986), Twins (1988), Total Recall (1990) and Starship Troopers (1997).

== Early life and education ==
Bell was born in Tulsa, Oklahoma, where he lived until age 13. His family then moved to Denver, Colorado. Bell attended boarding school at St. Paul's, Concord, New Hampshire, but was expelled. He then went to Fountain Valley School in Colorado Springs, where he became interested in acting after performing as Elwood Dowd in the play Harvey.

Bell was discouraged by others, however, who told him he was not a good enough actor, and did not act again for over 20 years. He attended the University of Colorado, majoring in sociology, and served three years in the Army. He eventually became a consultant, teaching business executives to improve their speaking skills.

== Career ==
Bell's movie debut was in the role as Ronsky in Alan Parker's drama Birdy (1984). After Birdy, he played Gerry Jones in the Fred Roos comedy Seven Minutes in Heaven (1985). His first major role was as the cruel Coach Schneider in the slasher/horror A Nightmare on Elm Street 2: Freddy's Revenge (1985). Bell played Mr. Lachance, Gordie's grieving father, in the adventure/drama Stand by Me (1986); the ruthless hitman, Webster, in the comedy Twins (1988) starring Arnold Schwarzenegger and Danny DeVito; and George, who has mutant Martian resistance leader, Kuato, attached to his stomach, in director Paul Verhoeven's blockbuster science fiction/adventure Total Recall (1990) starring Schwarzenegger.

He made his TV acting debut in the series The Oldest Rookie in 1987, playing Det. Gordon Lane. Bell starred as Ford Plasko in the short-lived series G vs E. His many guest appearances include Hill Street Blues, Wiseguy, Tales from the Crypt, The X-Files, Millennium, Deadwood and House. He has also appeared in a TV commercial for IBM.

Other movie roles include Lips' Cop in the action/crime thriller Dick Tracy (1990) opposite Warren Beatty; the title role of a frightening homeless man terrorizing Bill Paxton's character in the comedy/thriller The Vagrant (1992) opposite Paxton and Michael Ironside; General Owen in the science fiction/adventure Starship Troopers (1997); the warden, Marshall Krutch, in the award-winning biopic Capote (2005) opposite Philip Seymour Hoffman; John Leshing in the family/mystery Nancy Drew (2007) opposite Emma Roberts; and Principal Rocker in the comedy Hamlet 2 (2008). Bell also played the voice acting role as Mr. Sesehund in the animated feature feature Heidi 4 Paws (2008).

== Personal life ==
Bell is married to Milena Canonero, a four-time Oscar-winning costume designer, and they live in West Hollywood, California.

== Filmography ==
Year	Title	Role	Notes
1984	Birdy	Ronsky	
1985	Seven Minutes in Heaven	Gerry Jones	
1985	A Nightmare on Elm Street 2: Freddy's Revenge	Coach Schneider	
1986	Legal Eagles	Process Server	Uncredited
1986	Manhunter	Atlanta Policeman	Uncredited
1986	Stand by Me	Mr. LaChance	
1987	No Way Out	Contra #1	
1988	Cherry 2000	Bill	
1988	Johnny Be Good	Chief Elkans	
1988	Tucker: The Man and His Dream	Frank	
1988	Wildfire	Lewis	
1988	Twins	Webster, The Hitman	
1990	Total Recall	George, Kuato	
1990	Dick Tracy	Lip's Cop	
1990	Air America	Q.V.	
1991	Oscar	Reporter #1	
1992	The Vagrant	The Vagrant	
1992	Leather Jackets	Stranger	
1992	Diggstown	Warden Bates	
1992	Innocent Blood	March	
1993	Undercover Blues	Sykes	
1993	Heaven & Earth	Dinner Guest #3	
1994	The Chase	Ari Josephson	
1994	The Silence of the Hams	Cross Dressing Agent	
1994	Airheads	Carl Mace	
1994	Natural Born Killers	Deputy #1	
1994	The Puppet Masters	General Morgan	
1994	Love Is a Gun	Jean's Husband	
1995	Payback	Tom 'Gully' Gullerman	
1995	Things to Do in Denver When You're Dead	Lieutenant Atwater	
1995	Operation Dumbo Drop	Colonel Pederson	
1995	Just Looking	Dave	
1996	Too Fast Too Young	Detective Quentin Thompson	
1997	Truth or Consequences, N.M.	Police Lieutenant	
1997	The Brave	Larry	
1997	The End of Violence	Sheriff Call	
1997	Starship Troopers	General Owen	
1997	One of Our Own	Colonel Dale Cameron	
1999	Virus	J.W. Woods Jr.	
1999	A Slipping-Down Life	Mr. Casey	
1999	Black and White	'Toast'	
2000	Mercy	Gil Reynolds	
2000	Sand	Gus	
2000	Face the Music	Tommy The Bartender	
2002	Beneath Clouds	Boy At Service Station	
2002	Serving Sara	Warren Cebron	
2003	Northfork	Mr. Stalling	
2003	Identity	District Attorney	
2004	Dandelion	Uncle Bobby	
2005	Rebound	NCBA Vice President	Uncredited
2005	Capote	Warden Marshall Krutch	
2005	Pomegranate	Producer	
2006	Art School Confidential	Lonny	
2006	Room 6	Mr. Roberts	
2006	Rescue Dawn	Admiral Berrington	
2006	The Astronaut Farmer	Judge Miller	
2006	Little Chenier	Tuck Dupuis	
2007	Nancy Drew	John Leshing	
2007	Sex and Death 101	Victor Rose III	
2007	The Final Season	Harvey Makepeace	
2008	Hamlet 2	Principal Rocker	
2008	Stargate Atlantis	Terrence Kramer	Season 5: Episode 16 "Brain Storm "
2009	Heidi 4 Paws	Mr. Sesehund	Voice
2010	The Rock 'n' Roll Dreams of Duncan Christopher	Uncle Virgil	
2010	Footsteps	Mr. Dennenberg	
2011	Puncture	Jeffrey Dancort	
2011	The Rum Diary	Donovan	
2012	Somebody Up There Likes Me	Lyla's Father	
2012	To the Wonder	Bob	
2013	Vertical	Walter Stewart	
2013	The Bling Ring	L.A. Detective #1	
2013	Palo Alto	Jake	
2014	A Bit of Bad Luck	Mr. Creech	
2014	Home, James	Larry	
2015	90 Minutes in Heaven	Dr. Greider	
2015	Waffle Street	Miles Drake III	
2016	Director's Cut	Moving Company Guy	
2016	Is That a Gun in Your Pocket?	Dwayne	
2016	The Congressman	Sherm Hawkins	
2016	Rules Don't Apply	Colonel Maxwell	
2016	Thirty Nine	Lawyer	
2017	The Last Word	Mr. Daniels	
2020	Mainstream	Marty	
2020	Love Is Love Is Love	John	
2021	Outer Banks	Doctor	Season 2, Episode 3: "Prayers"
2025	Dreams	Michael McCarthy	
TBA	Last Train to Fortune	TBA	Post-production
