= Home, James (2013 film) =

2013 film

- Film poster
- Directed by: Jonathan Rossetti
- Written by: Jonathan Rossetti; Julie Gearheard
- Produced by: Julie Gearheard; Colin Moran; Jonathan Rossetti; Erin Anne Williams
- Starring: Jonathan Rossetti; Kerry Knuppe
- Cinematography: George Su
- Edited by: Karoliina Tuovinen
- Music by: Noah T
- Release dates: July 14, 2013 (Tulsa, Oklahoma)
- Running time: 83 minutes
- Country: United States
- Language: English

Home, James is a 2013 American romantic drama film directed by and starring Jonathan Rossetti.

== Cast ==
- Jonathan Rossetti as James
- Kerry Knuppe as Cooper
- Julie Gearheard as Sam
- Rick Dacey as Mike
- Kathleen Rose Perkins as Anita Massie
- Marshall Bell as Larry
- Maggie Kiley as Mother

== Production ==
The film was shot in Tulsa, Oklahoma.

== Reception ==
The film has an 83% rating on Rotten Tomatoes. Michael Smith of Tulsa World awarded the film three stars out of four.

=== Accolades ===
The film won the Best Oklahoma Film award at the 2013 DeadCENTER Film Festival.
