= Anchor Bay (Michigan) =

Freshwater bay, part of Lake St. Clair in Michigan

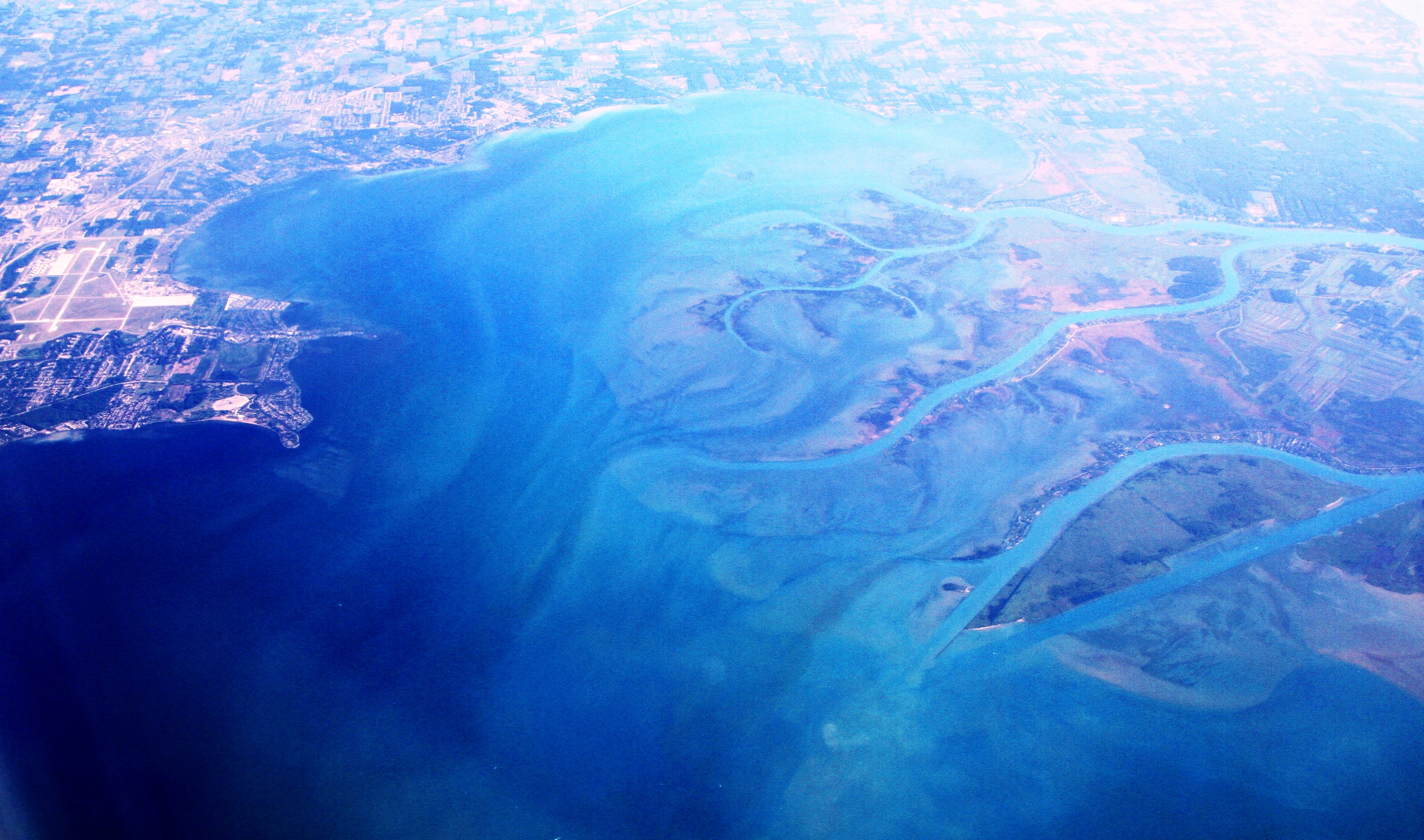
- Aerial view of the Anchor Bay from the south towards north, over Macomb County

- Location within Michigan Location within the United States
- Location: (Great Lakes)
- Coordinates: 42°37′N 82°43′W
- Type: Freshwater Bay
- Primary inflows: St. Clair River, Clinton River, Black Creek and Salt River.
- Primary outflows: Lake St. Clair and then to the Detroit River
- Basin countries: United States, Canada
- Max. length: 9 mi (14 km)
- Max. width: 10 mi (16 km)
- Surface area: 90 sq mi (233 km^{2})
- Islands: Strawberry Island, and the tips of Dickinson and Harsens Island
- Settlements: New Baltimore, Michigan, Anchor Bay Harbor, Michigan

Anchor Bay is a freshwater bay forming the northern region of Lake St. Clair in the U.S. state of Michigan. It generally encompasses the waters north of a line between Huron Point (part of the Lake St. Clair Metro Park Beach, not to be confused with Port Huron) and the Middle Channel of the St. Clair River (which enters Lake St. Clair between Dickinson Island and Harsens Island). It covers over 90 square miles (230 km^{2}) and has a depth of 1 to 11 feet (0.30 to 3.35 m), which is unusually shallow for its immense size.

== Geography ==
The bay is about 25 miles (40 km) northeast of downtown Detroit, Michigan. It is just south of New Baltimore, Michigan and borders the townships of Harrison, Clinton, Chesterfield, Ira, Clay, and several islands, including Dickinson and Harsens. The bay is notable because Canadian waters lie to the south of the adjacent United States territory and make up a major portion of Lake Saint Clair.

Anchor Bay measures over 8 nautical miles (15 km; 9.2 mi) from north to south and over 9 nautical miles (17 km; 10 mi) from east to west. It is fed by the St. Clair River, which flows southwards from Lake Huron and has an extensive river delta where it enters Lake Saint Clair, the largest delta of the Great Lakes System. This bay is part of the Great Lakes System.

== Naming ==
French explorers discovered and named Lake Saint Clair on August 12, 1679. Among the party of 34 men were voyageur Rene-Robert Cavelier, Sieur de la Salle and Roman Catholic friar Father Louis Hennepin. Aboard the Griffon, the first sailing vessel on the Upper Lakes, the group sailed from the Niagara Falls area on August 7, 1679, and entered the Detroit River on August 11. They reached Lake Saint Clair the following day and named it Lac Sainte Claire in honor of Sainte Claire of Assisi, whose feast day fell at that time. Sainte Claire established the order of Franciscan nuns, the Order of the Poor Claires. Government officials and mapmakers later changed the spelling to the present form of Saint Clair. This led to some confusion as to the true origin of the lake's name.

As early as 1710, the English identified the lake on their maps as Saint Clare. By the Mitchell Map in 1755, the spelling appeared as St. Clair, the form that became most widely used. Some scholars believe the name honors American Revolutionary War General Arthur St. Clair, later Governor of the Northwest Territory; however, the name Lake St. Clair was in use, with its current spelling, long before St. Clair became a notable figure. The lake's name and the general's name likely influenced the naming of St. Clair County, the township of St. Clair, and the cities of St. Clair and St. Clair Shores.

The name's origin has also been confused with Patrick Sinclair, a British officer who purchased land on the St. Clair River at the Pine River outlet. In 1764, he built Fort Sinclair, which was used for nearly 20 years before it was abandoned.

Unlike most smaller lakes in the region— like the Great Lakes—the word Lake occurs first in its name rather than at the end, reflecting its French origins.

== Water quality ==
Anchor Bay is a part of the largest freshwater delta in the Great Lakes. Its current water quality is quite good despite past pollution incidents and a history of chemical bio-accumulation. Several cities obtain their drinking water from or just downstream of the lake, and quality is closely monitored.

In the early 1970s, the Canadian and American governments closed the commercial fishery over concerns of bio-accumulation of mercury caused by the Dow Chemical Chlor-Alkali Plant in Sarnia, Ontario. Since 1949, Dow has operated mercury cell plants that produce chlorine and other chemicals, discharging mercury into the river and contaminating the fishery. The fishery has remained closed, although studies indicate mercury levels are now within safe ranges.

== Boat clubs ==
Many yacht clubs (boating and sailing clubs) are along the lake's shores, including:

- Clinton River Boat Club (Club Island), near Harsens Island, Michigan
- Albatross Yacht Club, Anchor Bay, Michigan
- North Star Sail Club, on the Clinton River, Harrison Twp, Michigan

== Public beaches ==
- New Baltimore - Beach at Walter and Mary Burke Park in Downtown New Baltimore, Michigan
- Lake St Clair Metropark - Harrison Township, MI
- Most of the small islands on the bay (Strawberry, Grassy Bends [locally known as "Grassy"]) have sandy beaches or sand bars to enjoy. Visitors should be aware that some are not family-friendly (notably that of nearby Gull Island, especially during Jobbie Nooner weekend).

== Fauna ==
Many of North America's freshwater fish species are found in the lake throughout the seasons. Species popular with anglers include bass, bluegill, bullhead, catfish, muskellunge, northern Pike, perch, salmon, smelt, steelhead, sturgeon, trout, and walleye. Several invasive species also inhabit the lake, including zebra mussels, sea lampreys, alewives and round gobies.

== See also ==
- St. Clair River
- Clinton River (Michigan)
- Harsens Island
