= Linette Beaumont =

British actress

Linette Beaumont is a British actress. She has appeared in Agatha Raisin Series 3, the Endeavour Series V drama, produced by Mammoth Studios; and co-starred in the award-winning film The Prowler. She's a veteran of numerous television productions including EastEnders, Casualty, and Coronation Street.

== Career ==
=== Beginnings ===
Beaumont's father was a Marine Commando who became the chief herdsman at the Hatfield House and her mother was an opera singer from New Zealand. She began dancing at three, trained with Ivy Baker, an original director of Laine Theatre Arts, and at age 16 began teaching dance to other children who would otherwise not have had the opportunity. She studied acting at Drama Centre London in her mid-20s. She was signed to her first talent agency before graduating from the Drama Centre and was cast in Lynda LaPlante's crime drama Trial and Retribution.

More roles followed with Holby City, Casualty, The Bill, Coronation Street, Grange Hill, a drama series on BBC One, and a 2004 drama Murder in Suburbia.

=== Stage ===
On stage, Beaumont's leading credits include playing Lady MacBeth described in a UK Theater critique by Sara Mae Tuson as the "journey she takes from manipulative harpy to broken queen" is a "vividly portrayed, compelling performance." Her work as the lead, Lady Teazle, in a School for Scandal was a "delicious" portrayal. Beaumont also played the leads as Martha Dobie in The Children's Hour and Libby in Blue Window.

=== Film and television ===
Beaumont played a wife interested in her dead husband's money on Agatha Raisin Series 3: When the Pig Turns, catching the suspicious eye of Agatha (Ashley Jensen). Beaumont says she "read the [Agatha Raisin] mystery books as a child" and says the show "is a tonic with wonderful mad characters." In the episode, Beaumont had to faint in her opening scene. "Everyone thought I fainted for real and came running to my aid," she recalled, saying the "joke was on me because I had to faint again and again."

She noted that working with director Craig Gillespie on Cruella was a "huge deal for me and unforgettable" because she's a big fan of his.

Beaumont starred opposite Dominic Rowan in The Prowler, an award-winning short film released March 2015. The project evolved from Beaumont's having previously worked with director Tim Kent at Pinewood Studios.

It was a "unique collaboration of industry veterans" with the screenplay written by television industry veteran and novelist Matthew Arlidge. Beaumont said her character in The Prowler "finds herself in a very dark place" and that it's her job "to tell my character's story without judgement.". Beaumont won for Best Performance, Toronto Film Festival 2017; Best Shorts California 2017; Madrid Film Festival 2017 Best Lead Actress, nomination.

The director of cinematography was BAFTA award-winner James Friend, ASC BSC; sound design by Glenn Freemantle.

Beaumont guest-starred on the ITV drama, Endeavour Series V: Episode 2 Cartouche, as the sister-in-law of Detective Thursday (Roger Allam) and the wife of his brother Charlie, played by Phil Daniels. She previously portrayed Cherish Hylton on EastEnders and guest-starred on Doctors.
Other productions of note include being cast in The Shooting Party, a classical TV drama based on Isabel Colgate's book of the same title; the sci-film The Ungone by Simon Bovey that was shortlisted at Cannes and described as a "near perfect sci-fi short"; and starred opposite Con O'Neil in the film What's Your Name 41?. She is in pre-production as the lead role in Melody's Tune, with writer-director Daniel Yost.

== Filmography ==
Year	Title	Role	Media
2023	Doctors	Trudy Palmer	Episode: "The Leaving Party"
2021	Cruella	Posh Guest 2	Film
2021	All the Things You Are	Tabitha	Film
2021	All Those Small Things	Dorothy	Film
2020	Agatha Raisin	Amy Beech	Sky One
2018	Endeavour Series V	Paulette	ITV
2018	Sparrows Call	Sarah	Film
2018	Melody's Tune	Wanda/Lulu	Film
2017	The Prowler Film	Eva	Film
2016	EastEnders	Cherish Hylton	BBC
2016	Doctors	Leona Sharpley	BBC
2013	MacBeth	Lady MacBeth	Traffic of the Stage
2010	The Bill	Lisa Cooper	ITV
2008	Coronation Street	Izzy	ITV
2007	Holby City	Roberta Colvin	BBC
2007	The Un-Gone	Maya Salinger	Film
2006	A School for Scandal	Lady Teazle	Upstairs at the Gatehouse
2005	The Bill	Sally Delveccio	ITV
2005	What's Your Name 41?	Natalia	Film
2003	EastEnders	Kimberly	BBC
2002	Trial and Retribution	Justine	ITV
2002	Grange Hill	Zoe Hartfield	BBC

== Personal Interests ==
Beaumont uses her professional acting and dance background to mentor and encourage children who have been bullied, have confidence issues, health problems and physical disabilities. She also has a rescue dog, Stan.
