= R.I.P.D. 2: Rise of the Damned =

2022 film by Paul Leyden

- Release poster
- Directed by: Paul Leyden
- Screenplay by: Andrew Klein; Paul Leyden
- Based on: Rest in Peace Department by Peter M. Lenkov
- Produced by: Ogden Gavanski
- Starring: Jeffrey Donovan; Penelope Mitchell; Jake Choi; Richard Brake; Rachel Adedeji; Kerry Knuppe; Evlyne Oyedokun
- Cinematography: Bruno Degrave
- Edited by: Kevin Armstrong
- Music by: J. Peter Robinson
- Production companies: Universal 1440 Entertainment; Dark Horse Entertainment
- Distributed by: Universal Pictures Home Entertainment
- Release date: November 15, 2022
- Running time: 102 minutes
- Country: United States
- Language: English

R.I.P.D. 2: Rise of the Damned is a 2022 direct-to-video buddy cop science fantasy film directed by Paul Leyden, from a screenplay he co-wrote with Andrew Klein, and produced by Universal Home Entertainment. Based on the Dark Horse comic book series R.I.P.D., it serves as a prequel to the 2013 film of the same name.

== Plot ==
Recruited by the R.I.P.D., a resurrected sheriff returns to Earth to save humanity from a gateway to hell.

The film's opening credits show Otis Clairborne opening a gateway to hell in search of gold, as a result of which a mysterious being takes possession of him.

A few months later, Sheriff Roy Pulsipher is killed by a gang of criminals led by Otis Clairborne in Red Creek (Utah). As in the first film, Roy enters an office of the Rest In Peace Department (R.I.P.D.) on his ascent to the afterlife. After looking through the weapons, Roy commits himself to the R.I.P.D. by shaking hands with the office manager Hano to fight Deados. He is sent back to Earth, lands in an outhouse in an open field, is overrun by buffalo and meets his partner, Jeanne d'Arc.

Since Roy is certain that he has shot one of the criminals who is still alive, he assumes that they are Deados. Roy and Jeanne intercept a prison transport with three captured criminals, distract the marshals and identify one of the prisoners as Deado because of the burn on his upper body. Jeanne causes him to explode with a drop of holy water and implode with her sword. Another criminal overpowers Roy, but is eliminated by Jeanne. They question the third, Slim Samuels, about Otis Clairborne's plans and take him prisoner.

They arrive in a deserted town and check into a hotel. As Roy and Jeanne appear on Earth as two black sisters, the hotel owner and mayor, Mayor Julius Butterfield, is hesitant to take them in. Both Butterfield and the hotel employee Beverly are suffering from a cough, which they believe is caused by gases from a mine on a mountain. Roy and Jeanne tie up Slim and go to the mine, where Butterfield has already tried to betray them in exchange for a gas mask, but are overpowered and imprisoned. In prison, Roy meets Angus again, the fiancé of his daughter Charlotte.

Clairborne plans to have the prisoners open the gate to hell, as the Deados are unable to do so themselves. The escaped Deados are then to take possession of the prisoners.

Beverly frees Slim, who is not, as suspected by Roy, responsible for his death (Butterfield had fake wanted notices printed for Slim). Slim frees Roy, Jeanne and Angus. Jeanne is able to overcome her fear of fire, jumps over the open gateway to hell and throws in a drop of Jesus' tears, which she found centuries ago in a plundered church, and thus closes the gate. What remains is the demon Astaroth, a helper of the devil, which has possessed Clairborne. In the final battle, Roy finds the tears of Jesus, drizzles his bullets and shoots Astaroth.

Slim and Beverly are appointed sheriff and deputy sheriff and arrest Butterfield for Roy's murder. Butterfield explains that he had mistaken Roy for a criminal that he was on the run from. Roy attends his daughter's wedding to Angus. Roy wants to say goodbye to Jeanne, but thanks to his minimum contract term of 100 years, he is still bound to her.

== Cast ==
- Jeffrey Donovan as Roycephus "Roy" Pulsipher
- Rachel Adedeji as Avatar Roy
- Penelope Mitchell as Jeanne d'Arc
- Evlyne Oyedokun as Avatar Jeanne
- Jake Choi as Slim Samuels
- Richard Brake as Mayor Otis Clairborne
- Tilly Keeper as Charlotte Pulsipher, Roy's daughter
- Stephanie Levi-John as Beverly, a Hotel employee
- Richard Fleeshman as Angus, Charlotte's fiancé
- Kerry Knuppe as Hano
- Péter Fancsikai as a Bank accountant

== Development ==
In August 2022, it was announced that a prequel film titled R.I.P.D. 2: Rise of the Damned had been filmed, which stars Jeffrey Donovan, Penelope Mitchell, Jake Choi, Richard Brake and Kerry Knuppe, for Universal Pictures Home Entertainment.

== Release ==
The film was released directly to Blu-ray and DVD on November 15, 2022.

=== Critical reception ===
On the review aggregator website Rotten Tomatoes, 25% of 4 critics' reviews are positive, with an average rating of 3.1/10.

Paste gave it a negative review.
