= James Faulkner (actor) =

British actor (born 1948)

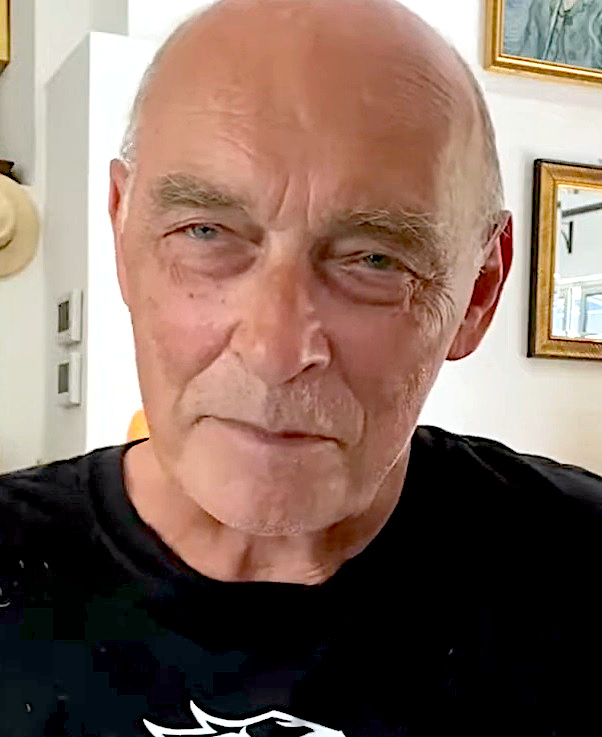
- Faulkner at German Comic Con 2021
- Born: James Sebastian Faulkner; 18 July 1948 (age 78); Hampstead, London, England, UK
- Education: Royal Central School of Speech and Drama; Wrekin College
- Occupation: Actor
- Years active: 1970–present
- Spouse: Kate Faulkner (m. 1976)
- Children: 2

James Sebastian Faulkner (born 18 July 1948) is a British actor. He is best known for playing Pope Sixtus IV in the television series Da Vinci's Demons (2014–2015), Randyll Tarly in the television series Game of Thrones (2016–2017), and Saint Paul in the film Paul, Apostle of Christ (2018).

== Early life ==
James Faulkner was born in Hampstead, on 18 July 1948. For three years, he studied acting at the Royal Central School of Speech and Drama.

== Career ==
In 1972, Faulkner made his acting debut as Josef Strauss in the musical film The Great Waltz at the age of 24.

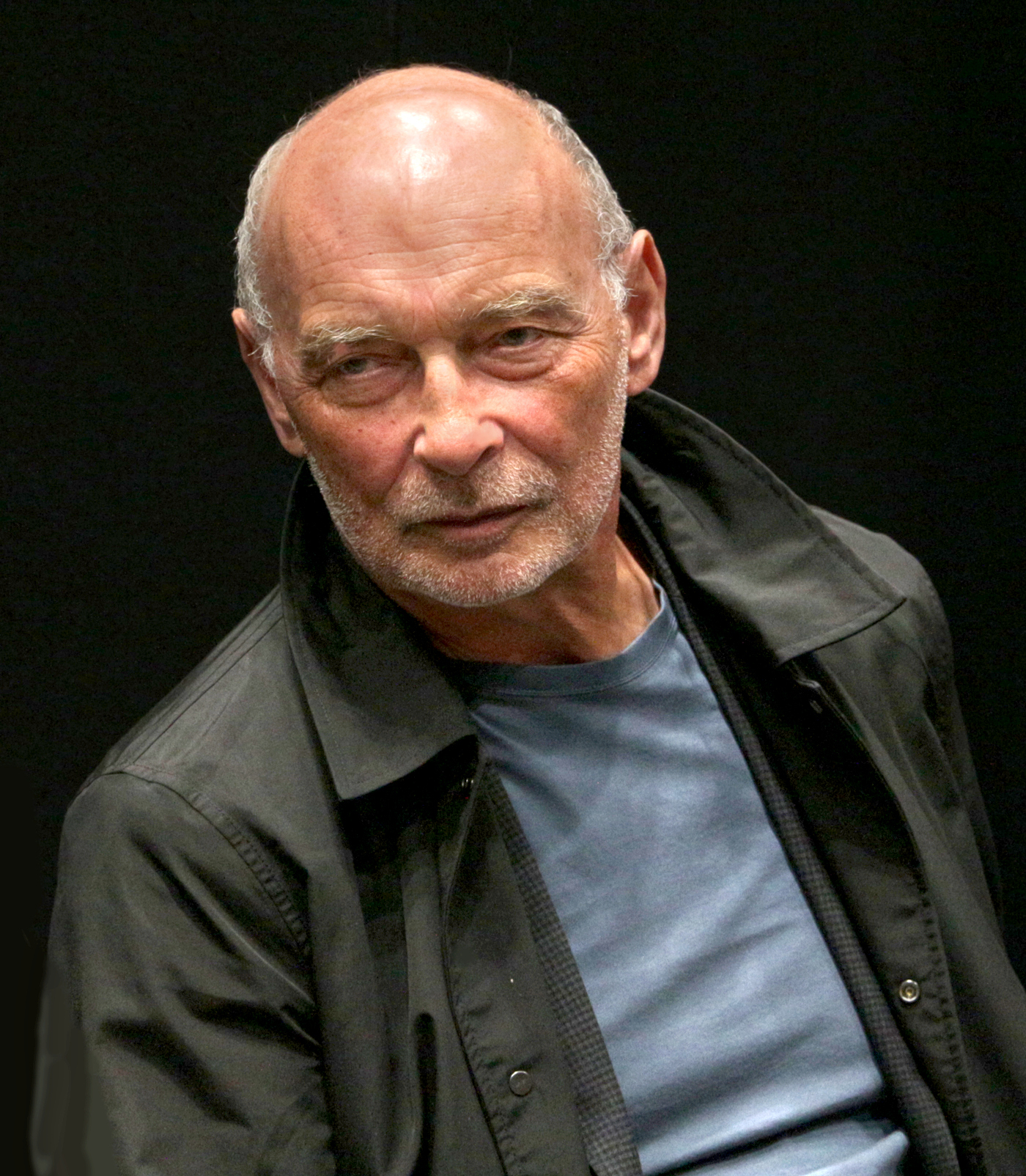
James Faulkner on stage at the Glasgow Film and Comic Con 2018

In 2016, Faulkner was cast as Randyll Tarly, the strict father of Samwell Tarly, in the HBO fantasy television series Game of Thrones, for the show's sixth season. In 2018, Faulkner has portrayed the title character in the Christian film Paul, Apostle of Christ.

== Filmography ==
=== Film ===
Year	Title	Role	Notes
1972	The Great Waltz	Josef Strauss	
1974	The Abdication	Magnus de la Gardie	
1975	Conduct Unbecoming	2nd Lt. Edward Millington	
1976	Whispering Death	Terrick	
1979	Zulu Dawn	Teignmouth Melvill	
1980	Flashpoint Africa	Ramon Funes	
1981	Priest of Love	Aldous Huxley	
1983	Eureka	Roger	
1992	Carry On Columbus	Torquemada	
1992	Lovejoy 'Friends in High Places'	Alfredo Pereira	
1996	Crimetime	Crowley	
1997	A Kid in Aladdin's Palace	Luxor	
2001	Burning Down the House	Hal Lander	
2001	Bridget Jones's Diary	Uncle Geoffrey	
2003	I Capture the Castle	Aubrey Fox-Cotton	
2004	Bridget Jones: The Edge of Reason	Uncle Geoffrey	
2004	Agent Cody Banks 2: Destination London	Lord Duncan Kenworth	
2005	Colour Me Kubrick	Oliver	
2006	The Conclave	Cardinal Guillaume D'Estouteville	
2006	The Good Shepherd	Lord Cooper	
2006	Day of Wrath	Friar Anselmo	
2007	Hitman	Smith Jamison	
2008	The Bank Job	Guy Singer	
2011	X-Men: First Class	Swiss Bank Manager	
2016	Bridget Jones's Baby	Uncle Geoffrey	
2016	Underworld: Blood Wars	Cassius	
2017	Final Portrait	Pierre Matisse	
2017	Atomic Blonde	Chief C	
2018	Paul, Apostle of Christ	Saint Paul	
2018	The Sonata	Sir Victor Ferdinand	
2021	All Those Small Things	Jonathan Robbins	
2022	The Devil Conspiracy	Cardinal Vincini	
2022	Hounded	Remington Redwick	
2023	Awareness	El Americano	
2024	Chief of Station	Deputy Director Williams	
2025	The Last Supper	Caiaphas	
2025	Wake Up Dead Man	Reverend Prentice Wicks	

=== Television ===
Year	Title	Role	Notes
1976	I, Claudius	Herod Agrippa	TV serial, 6 episodes
1978	Hazell	Gordon Gregory	6 episodes
1984	Minder	Apsimon	Episode: The Car Lot Baggers
1984	Strangers and Brothers	Christopher Mansel	Episode: #13
1985	The Bill	Sidney Sharman	Episode: Burning the Books
1985	Minder on the Orient Express	Ted Moore	TV Film spin off.
1986	First Among Equals	Simon Kerslake	TV serial
1988	The Hound of the Baskervilles	Stapleton	Alongside Jeremy Brett and Edward Hardwicke for the Granada TV production
1989	Frederick Forsyth Presents	Markus Vogel	Just Another Secret (1989)
1989	The Shadow Trader	David Constance	Two part mini-series for TVNZ
1989	Agatha Christie's Poirot	Major Eustace	Episode: Murder in the Mews (Series 1 Episode 2)
1991	Inspector Morse	Basilios Vasilakis	Episode: Greeks Bearing Gifts (Series 5 Episode 4)
1992	The Blackheath Poisonings	Roger Vandervent	3 episodes
1994	Wycliffe	Steven Lander	Episode: The Dead Flautist (Series 1 Episode 2)
1997	Pie in the Sky	Ronald Quicke	Episode: Cutting the Mustard (Series 5 Episode 4)
1998	Taggart	Colonel Robert Falkirk	Episode: Dead Reckoning (Series 14 Episode 41)
2010	Ben Hur	Marcellus	TV mini-series, 2 episodes
2010	Spooks	Robert Westhouse	Series 9 Episode 2
2013–2015	Da Vinci's Demons	Pope Sixtus IV	24 episodes
2014	Downton Abbey	Lord Sinderby	4 episodes
2016	Life on Earth: A New Prehistory	Narrator	3 episodes
2016–2017	Game of Thrones	Randyll Tarly	5 episodes
2018	Death in Paradise	Frank O'Toole	Episode: Written in Murder (Series 7 Episode 3)
2018	Watership Down	Frith	Episode: The Journey
2020	The Alienist	Cornelius Vanderbilt II	Recurring role
2020	Wizards: Tales of Arcadia	King Arthur/Green Knight	Main Voice Role
2021	Tribes of Europa	General Cameron	Recurring role
2022	Slow Horses	Charles Partner	Recurring role - Episodes 2 & 6
2025	Hotel Costiera	Aaron Tarsky	Episode: Sheryl

=== Video games ===
Year	Title	Role	Notes
2001	Walking with Beasts: Operation Salvage	Voice	
2009	Harry Potter and the Half-Blood Prince	Professor Severus Snape (voice)	
2012	Blades of Time	Narrator, Brutal Lich (voices)	
2014	Dragon Age: Inquisition	Cassandra's Associate (voice)	
2016	The Turing Test	T.O.M (voice)	
2018	League of Legends	Swain (voice)	
