= Jack Roberts (actor) =

American actor

Jack Roberts (born 1979) is an American actor, writer, and producer from Tulsa, Oklahoma. He is a graduate of The New School. He's best known for his Duncan Christopher in The Rock 'n' Roll Dreams of Duncan Christopher.
