= The Rock 'n' Roll Dreams of Duncan Christopher =

- Directed by: Justin Monroe
- Written by: Jack Roberts
- Produced by: Jack Roberts; Justin Monroe; Gillian Fritzsche; Ryan Fritzsche; Jim Edwards; Payton Dunham
- Starring: Jack Roberts; Peter Bedgood; Marshall Bell
- Cinematography: Luc Nicknair
- Edited by: Ryan Fritzsche
- Release date: 2010
- Country: United States
- Language: English

The Rock 'n' Roll Dreams of Duncan Christopher is an American independent comedy film written by Jack Roberts and directed by Justin Monroe. It stars Jack Roberts as the titular character, Duncan Christopher.

The Rock 'n' Roll Dreams of Duncan Christopher was filmed in and near Tulsa, Oklahoma, in the fall of 2008. It was in post-production for most of 2009. It premiered in 2010 on March 27 at the Method Fest Independent Film Festival, where it was nominated for Best Low Budget Feature Film and won the award for Best Marketing Campaign. The movie went on to win 10 awards with 7 of them Best Feature, Jury or Audience Awards, including the Best Okie Feature at the 2010 deadCENTER Film Festival. It was an Official Selection at several prestigious film festivals around the world, including Mar del Plata Film Festival in Argentina, STARZ Denver Film Festival, San Diego International Film Festival, and the Heartland Film Festival.

== Plot ==
Duncan Christopher, the awkward son of a rock legend, works through the suicide of his father in the brutal underground world of karaoke.

== Cast ==
- Jack Roberts as Duncan Christopher: socially awkward, home-schooled rock-star wanna-be from rural Oklahoma.
- Peter Bedgood as Charlie Bordeaux: Duncan's cousin, bandmate, and manager.
- Marshall Bell as Uncle Virgil: Duncan's codgerly uncle.
- Lizz Carter as Geneveve Reynolds: Duncan's love interest.
- Aaron Moreland as Simply Irresistible: Duncan's arch memesis, the reigning Karaoke king of Tulsa, OK.
- Heather Roberts as Angeline Christopher: Duncan's quirkily embittered sister.

== Awards ==
The film won numerous awards both nationally and internationally, unless otherwise noted in 2010.

Awards
Festival	Award	Recipient(s)	Outcome
Edmonton International Film Festival	Best Indie Feature Film		Won
Edmonton International Film Festival	Rising Star Award	Jack Roberts	Won
The United Film Festivals (Tulsa)	Jury Award - Best Narrative Feature Film		Won
The United Film Festivals (Tulsa)	Audience Award - Best Feature Film		Won
Method Fest Independent Film Festival	Stella Artois Maverick Award for Low Budget Feature Film		Nominated
Method Fest Independent Film Festival	Maverick Award for Best Marketing		Won
deadCENTER Film Festival	Best Okie Feature Film		Won
Offshoot Film Festival	Jury Award - Best Feature Film		Won
Offshoot Film Festival	Audience Award - Best Feature Film		Won
Idyllwild International Festival of Cinema (2011)	Audience Award - Best of Fest		Won
Idyllwild International Festival of Cinema (2011)	Best Score / Soundtrack	Damion Shade; Joe Cinocca; Ryan M. Fritzsche	Won
Mar del Plata Film Festival	Best Soundtrack		Nominated

The film was also an official selection at a number of other film festivals in 2010 and 2011 including:

- The United Film Festivals (Los Angeles, 2010)
- Temecula Valley International Film Festival, (2010)
- The United Film Festivals (San Francisco, 2010)
- Starz Denver Film Festival (2010)
- Heartland Film Festival (2010)
- San Diego Film Festival (2010)
- Kansas International Film Festival (2010)
- The United Film Festivals (New York, 2010)
- Vermont International Film Festival (2010)
- The United Film Festivals (London, 2010)
- Bend Film Festival (2010)
- Comedy Cluj Film Festival (Romania, 2011)

== Distribution ==
On May 22, 2012 both the film and soundtrack were released by Gravitas Ventures and Velvet Blue Music respectively. After a limited theatrical run, the film transitioned into a full digital release beginning with iTunes and has since rolled out to other significant cable/VOD providers including Amazon, AT&T U-Verse, Charter, Verizon, Dish Network and Mediacom. The soundtrack had a full digital release including platforms such as iTunes, Amazon, Spotify, Rhapsody, eMusic and Insound. It was also released in retail stores across the U.S.
