= All Those Small Things =

2021 American drama film written and directed by Andrew Hyatt

- Poster
- Directed by: Andrew Hyatt
- Written by: Andrew Hyatt
- Produced by: Rich Cowan; Caleb Applegate; Cory Pyke; Marc Dahlstrom; Nike Imoru
- Starring: James Faulkner; Kerry Knuppe; Aaron Dalla Villa
- Cinematography: Gerardo Madrazo
- Edited by: Travis Berry
- Music by: Sean Johnson
- Production companies: Rebel Kat Productions; North by Northwest Entertainment; Chi Rho Films
- Distributed by: Moonstone Entertainment
- Release date: April 8, 2021 (Seattle International Film Festival)
- Running time: 107 minutes
- Country: United States
- Language: English

All Those Small Things is a 2021 American drama film written and directed by Andrew Hyatt and starring James Faulkner, Kerry Knuppe and Aaron Dalla Villa.

The film premiered at the Seattle International Film Festival on April 8, 2021.

== Synopsis ==
After the recent death of a close friend, Jonathan Robbins, a British game show host, searches for a deeper meaning for his life when he travels to the United States after receiving a letter from a young fan.

== Cast ==
- James Faulkner as Jonathan Robbins
- Kerry Knuppe as Ruby
- Aaron Dalla Villa as Dennis aka "Tiny Hammer"
- Gloria Laino as Alice
- Lacy Hartselle as Svetlana
- Cliff Parisi as Nick
- David Robb as David
- Nigel Betts as Spencer
- Jim Meskimen as Brian
- Andrew Bricknell as Michael
- Nike Imoru as TV Producer
- Obadiah Freeman as Benjamin
- Joe Hartzler as Gene
- David S. Hogan as Artie
- Kate Vita as Katie
- John Forbes as Sonny
- Sharva Maynard as Amanda
- Linette Beaumont as Dorothy
- Chris Hansen as Stoner Dude
- Jinny Ryann as Party Girl
- Afaria Duke as Party Guy
- John Paulsen as Cowboy
- D.R. Anderson as Cowboy #2
- Charles Talley as Cowboy #3
- Melaine Moore as Blonde #1

== Production ==
=== Development and pre-production ===
Executive producers Nike Imoru and Rebecca Petriello optioned the script in 2018 after being intrigued by its themes of age and aging, with hopes that audiences would relate to the protagonist's journey, and the story's message that changing "“just one life for the better” can lead to radical and transformative shifts in ourselves." On August 13, 2019, the Board of Directors at Washington Filmworks' Local Lens Program gave approval to have the film shot in the state. On November 15, 2019, James Faulkner was cast in the lead role of Jonathan Robbins, marking his second collaboration with writer and director Andrew Hyatt.

=== Filming ===
The film was shot on location in Spokane, Washington, London and Marlow from November 2019 and into early-2020.

=== Post-production ===
Post-production work on the film was done remotely due to the COVID-19 pandemic.

== Release ==
On November 5, 2020, Moonstone Entertainment acquired the world sales rights to the film ahead of that year's virtual edition of the American Film Market. It held its world premiere virtually at the Seattle International Film Festival on April 8, 2021.

== Reception ==
The film, as of April 14, 2021, received mixed reviews from critics. Stefan Milne of Seattle Met was mixed about the film, writing that "It doesn’t know quite where it is, or what it is. Its depiction of small-town Washington trades in the broadest of caricatures, which then veer dully into tropes of rural authenticity (everyone turns out to be kindhearted and generous). The comedy doesn’t land, and the drama—even in Faulkner’s able hands—skews tired and maudlin." Josiah Teal of Film Threat praised Faulkner and Knuppe's performances but criticized the uneven tone of the film, citing the characterization of Villa's "Tiny Hammer" as one of the main reasons. He went on to add that it was "an uplifting film about finding your place in the world. If you're a fan of the genre or want to see a solid Jonathan Faulkner performance outside of Westeros, this is a solid watch."
