= New Baltimore, Michigan =

- City
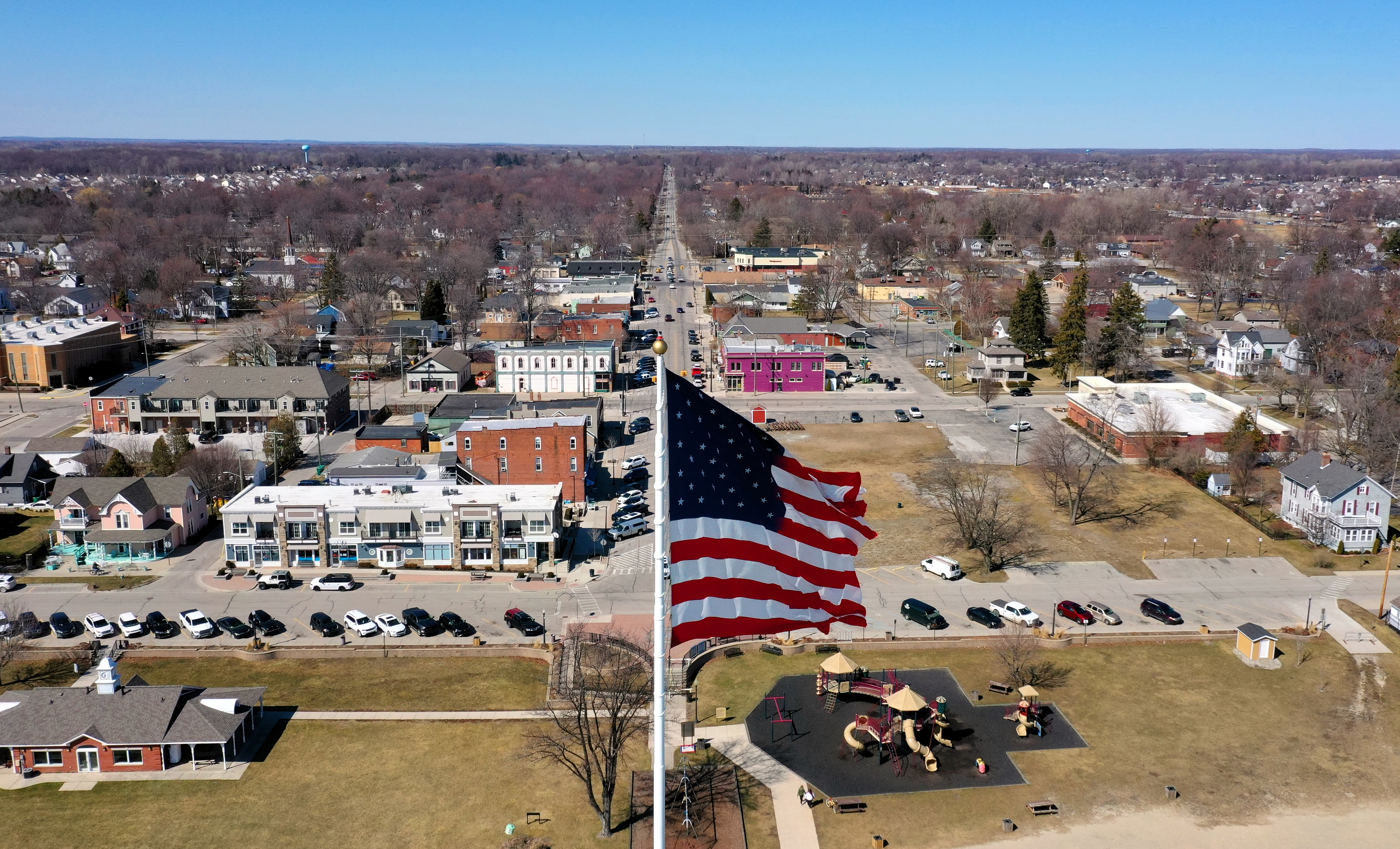
- Aerial view centered along Washington Street

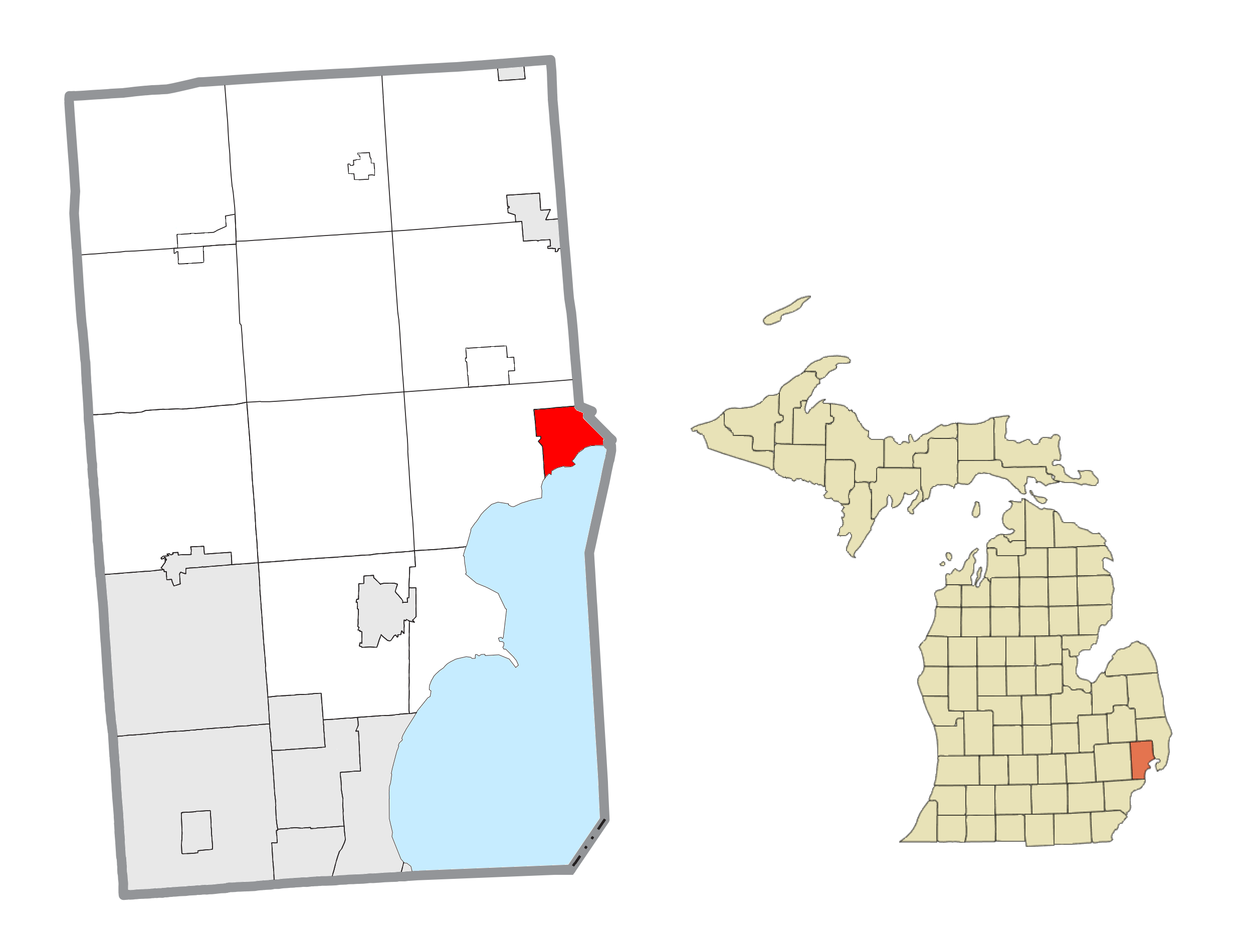
- Location within Macomb County and the state of Michigan

- Location within Michigan Location within the United States
- Coordinates: 42°40′52″N 82°44′13″W
- Country: United States
- State: Michigan
- County: Macomb
- Settled: 1796
- Incorporated: 1867 (village); 1931 (city)

Government
  - Type: Mayor–council
  - Mayor: Thomas Semaan
  - Clerk: Marcella (Marcia) Shinska
  - Treasurer: Jeanne Bade

Area
  - Total: 6.73 sq mi (17.42 km^{2})
  - Land: 4.60 sq mi (11.92 km^{2})
  - Water: 2.12 sq mi (5.50 km^{2})
- Elevation: 584 ft (178 m)

Population (2020)
  - Total: 12,117
  - Estimate (2023): 11,992
  - Density: 2,605.6/sq mi (1,006.04/km^{2})
- Time zone: UTC-5 (Eastern (EST))
  - Summer (DST): UTC-4 (EDT)
- ZIP Code: 48047
- Area code: 586
- FIPS code: 26-57100
- GNIS feature ID: 0633313
- Website: www.cityofnewbaltimore.org

New Baltimore is a city in Macomb County in the U.S. state of Michigan. The population was 12,117 at the 2020 census. New Baltimore is a northern suburb of Metro Detroit and is located along the northern shores of Lake St. Clair.

== History ==
New Baltimore incorporated as a village in 1867 and as a city in 1931. Previously, it was split between Macomb and St. Clair counties; however, in the 1970s, the city was able to petition to adjust the county boundaries such that it would align with the city's eastern border. This placed New Baltimore completely in Macomb County, where it remains to this day. The town sits on the waterfront along Lake St. Clair's Anchor Bay, and offers a public park, beach, and downtown-shopping district.

Prior to the arrival of European settlers, indigenous tribes are known to have inhabited much of New Baltimore's shoreline for thousands of years, and in the 1800s the land was recorded to have many ancient burial mounds and man made earth-works. W.B Hinsdale excavated multiple sites in New Baltimore, and recorded his countless findings in his novels in the early 20th century. Most of these locations have long been destroyed by treasure hunters and developed over, with an unfortunate though seemingly familiar lack of regard to the public's knowledge of the city's vast history with indigenous tribes.

German explorer Pierre Yax (b.1763) in Grosse Pointe, New France (now Michigan) was the first recorded non-Native American in the New Baltimore area. Pierre Yax was a son of Johan Michael Jacks, the first German in what would eventually become the state of Michigan. Pierre Yax arrived in New Baltimore in 1796 and subsequently obtained a land grant signed by President John Quincy Adams on July 23, 1826. The land grant tracked back to a land patent Yax had in 1812, when Michigan was still part of the Michigan Territory.

Later, other French settlers came to this area and took residence along the waterfront and rivers. They developed farms that had narrow frontage of 400 of 900 feet and extended inland from the water. Generally, the depth of the parcel was determined by how far a man could plow or cultivate in a day.

The first evidence of a settled community came in 1845, when a Mount Clemens businessman, Alfred Ashley, platted 60 acres (24 ha) of land lying on both sides of Washington Street. This would become known as the village of Ashley. On September 20, 1851, a post office called Ashleyville was established with Ashley as postmaster. Ashley also opened businesses in lumbering, shipping, and real estate. The original village of Ashley occupied what is now the center part of downtown New Baltimore, extending northwest along Clay, Base and Maria Streets from Anchor Bay. The land was subdivided in the typical gridiron fashion used in most American communities at that time. Over the years, irregularities developed in the gridiron subdivision pattern because of the lack of local controls, conflicts with French claims, and changing land uses, particularly along the waterfront area. This created problems in both subdivision patterns in general and waterfront use in particular that remain today. This original settlement bore Ashley's name until 1867, when the village name was changed to New Baltimore.

Throughout its history, New Baltimore has been linked to the regional economy by virtue of the city's access to the waterfront and the region's transportation network. In its early years, New Baltimore took advantage of its waterfront location to operate port facilities exporting agriculture and manufacturing products to other communities. The area was known for the manufacturing of barrels, brooms, bricks, coffins, corsets, and creamery products. Lumber products and building materials were shipped by boat from the local mills. Development was heavily oriented to the waterfront, where shipping piers extended a hundred or more feet into the lake.

As automobile transportation increased in importance and travel patterns changed, so did the development of the city. Goods were no longer shipped by water and the waterfront slowly changed. Between 1860 and 1880, New Baltimore changed from a strong manufacturing and exporting community to a thriving community in Macomb County with many resort activities and well-known commercial establishments. The community was a popular getaway spot for Metro Detroiters and boasted an opera house, hotels, salt baths (which nearby city of Mount Clemens was famous for in the late 19th and early 20th centuries), summer and winter recreational activities, saloons, a brewery and numerous resort and commercial establishments. The city was in the path of a steam locomotive line that ran between Detroit and Port Huron in the late 19th century. As technology changed, the city constructed an electricity plant to accommodate inter-urban passenger trains, which lasted until the mid-1920s. Today, access to the city is provided via Interstate 94. The historic New Baltimore water tower was demolished in the summer of 2015 and raised in the park to take its place was the State's tallest flag. The flagpole stands at 160 feet tall on the shores of Anchor Bay at Walter and Mary Burke Park. The New Baltimore Lions Club raised more than $100,000 to have the flagpole installed with the intention of creating a landmark for boaters after the city's historic water tower was demolished. A dedication ceremony took place in October 2016.

== Geography ==
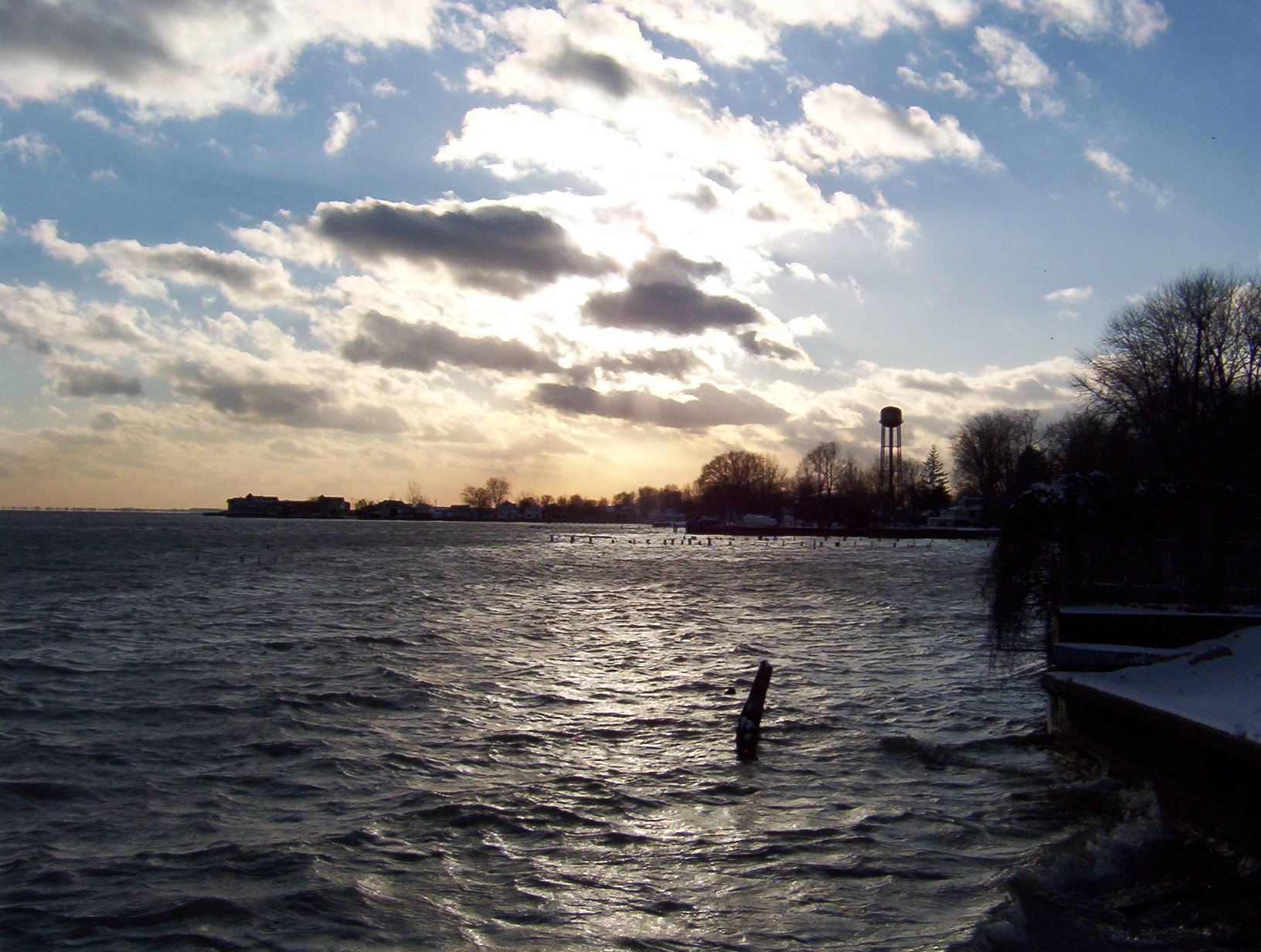
New Baltimore's water tower over Anchor Bay of Lake St. Clair

New Baltimore is in eastern Macomb County, with its eastern border following the St. Clair County line. It is on the northern shore of Anchor Bay, the northernmost part of Lake St. Clair. Highway M-29 passes through the city as Main Street, leading east 14 miles (23 km) to Algonac on the St. Clair River and west 4 miles (6 km) to Interstate 94 in Chesterfield Township. New Baltimore is 10 miles (16 km) northeast of Mount Clemens, the Macomb county seat.

According to the United States Census Bureau, the city has a total area of 6.73 square miles (17.43 km^{2}), of which 4.60 square miles (11.91 km^{2}) are land and 2.12 square miles (5.49 km^{2}), or 31.6%, are water.

== Demographics ==
Historical population
Census	Pop.	Note	%±
1880	1,024		—
1890	865		−15.5%
1900	922		6.6%
1910	920		−0.2%
1920	974		5.9%
1930	1,148		17.9%
1940	1,434		24.9%
1950	2,043		42.5%
1960	3,159		54.6%
1970	4,132		30.8%
1980	5,439		31.6%
1990	5,798		6.6%
2000	7,405		27.7%
2010	12,084		63.2%
2020	12,117		0.3%
2023 (est.)	11,992		−1.0%
U.S. Decennial Census

=== 2020 census ===
As of the 2020 census, New Baltimore had a population of 12,117. The median age was 42.3 years. 22.1% of residents were under the age of 18 and 15.0% of residents were 65 years of age or older. For every 100 females there were 97.3 males, and for every 100 females age 18 and over there were 95.2 males age 18 and over.

100.0% of residents lived in urban areas, while 0.0% lived in rural areas.

There were 4,638 households in New Baltimore, of which 32.9% had children under the age of 18 living in them. Of all households, 55.9% were married-couple households, 15.2% were households with a male householder and no spouse or partner present, and 22.6% were households with a female householder and no spouse or partner present. About 24.4% of all households were made up of individuals and 11.2% had someone living alone who was 65 years of age or older.

There were 4,775 housing units, of which 2.9% were vacant. The homeowner vacancy rate was 0.4% and the rental vacancy rate was 2.0%.

Racial composition as of the 2020 census
Race	Number	Percent
White	10,962	90.5%
Black or African American	312	2.6%
American Indian and Alaska Native	53	0.4%
Asian	99	0.8%
Native Hawaiian and Other Pacific Islander	4	0.0%
Some other race	51	0.4%
Two or more races	636	5.2%
Hispanic or Latino (of any race)	294	2.4%

=== 2010 census ===
As of the census of 2010, there were 12,084 people, 4,434 households, and 3,187 families living in the city. The population density was 2,621.3 inhabitants per square mile (1,012.1/km^{2}). There were 4,740 housing units at an average density of 1,028.2 per square mile (397.0/km^{2}). The racial makeup of the city was 94.4% White, 2.7% African American, 0.4% Native American, 0.9% Asian, 0.2% from other races, and 1.4% from two or more races. Hispanic or Latino of any race were 1.8% of the population.

There were 4,434 households, of which 41.3% had children under the age of 18 living with them, 60.0% were married couples living together, 8.2% had a female householder with no husband present, 3.6% had a male householder with no wife present, and 28.1% were non-families. 23.3% of all households were made up of individuals, and 9.1% had someone living alone who was 65 years of age or older. The average household size was 2.72 and the average family size was 3.25.

The median age in the city was 37.1 years. 28.8% of residents were under the age of 18; 6.6% were between the ages of 18 and 24; 29.6% were from 25 to 44; 25.1% were from 45 to 64; and 9.8% were 65 years of age or older. The gender makeup of the city was 48.9% male and 51.1% female.

=== 2000 census ===
As of the census of 2000, there were 7,405 people, 2,942 households, and 1,994 families living in the city. The population density was 1,604.5 inhabitants per square mile (619.5/km^{2}). There were 3,218 housing units at an average density of 697.3 per square mile (269.2/km^{2}). The racial makeup of the city was 96.89% White, 0.53% African American, 0.36% Native American, 0.47% Asian, 0.04% Pacific Islander, 0.46% from other races, and 1.27% from two or more races. Hispanic or Latino of any race were 1.34% of the population.

There were 2,942 households, out of which 33.1% had children under the age of 18 living with them, 56.3% were married couples living together, 8.2% had a female householder with no husband present, and 32.2% were non-families. 27.4% of all households were made up of individuals, and 10.4% had someone living alone who was 65 years of age or older. The average household size was 2.48 and the average family size was 3.05.

In the city, the population was spread out, with 25.4% under the age of 18, 6.8% from 18 to 24, 34.3% from 25 to 44, 23.7% from 45 to 64, and 9.7% who were 65 years of age or older. The median age was 36 years. For every 100 females, there were 94.6 males. For every 100 females age 18 and over, there were 92.7 males.

The median income for a household in the city was $60,699, and the median income for a family was $72,046. Males had a median income of $49,648 versus $33,083 for females. The per capita income for the city was $26,921. About 1.0% of families and 3.5% of the population were below the poverty line, including 1.3% of those under age 18 and 8.0% of those age 65 or over.

== Government ==
New Baltimore is a home-rule city with an elected mayor and six at-large council members. Since 2022, Tom Semaan has served as mayor.

The city of New Baltimore is within the boundaries of the Anchor Bay School District, and hosts Lighthouse Elementary, Ashley Elementary, Anchor Bay Middle School North, and Anchor Bay's Aquatic Center.

== Michigan's tallest flagpole ==
Since 2016 the focal point of the community has been Michigan's tallest flagpole. The pole is 160 feet (49 m) high and the American flag it holds is 30 by 60 feet (9.1 by 18.3 m) and sits on the edge of Lake Saint Clair's Anchor Bay. The $103,000 cost was paid for with donations led by an initial contribution of $10,000 by the New Baltimore Lions Club.

== Notable people ==
- Butch Hartman, animator
- Roy Kellerman, Secret Service agent
- Kathleen Rose Perkins, actress
- Claudia Schmidt, folk singer
- Tom Stanton, writer
