= Chesterfield Township, Michigan =

- Charter township
- Chesterfield Charter Township
- Flag Logo

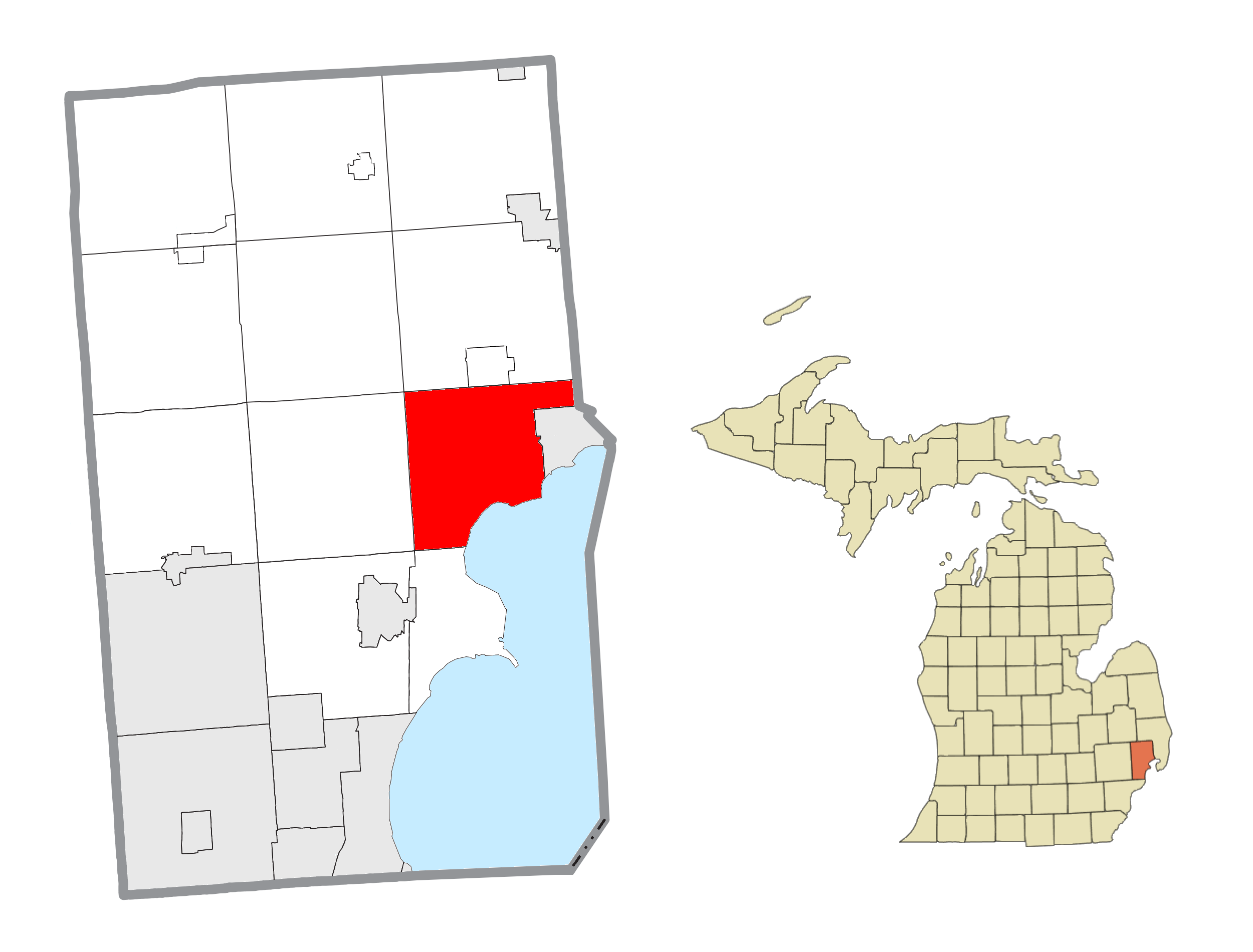
- Location of Chesterfield Township in Macomb County, Michigan (left) and of Macomb County in Michigan (right)

- Location within Michigan Location within the United States
- Coordinates: 42°40′15″N 82°48′34″W
- Country: United States
- State: Michigan
- County: Macomb
- Organized: 1842

Area
  - Total: 30.6 sq mi (79 km^{2})
  - Land: 27.6 sq mi (71 km^{2})
  - Water: 3.0 sq mi (7.8 km^{2})
- Elevation: 590 ft (180 m)

Population (2020)
  - Total: 45,376
  - Density: 1,644.3/sq mi (634.9/km^{2})
- Time zone: UTC-5 (Eastern (EST))
  - Summer (DST): UTC-4 (EDT)
- ZIP Codes: 48047, 48051
- Area code: 586
- FIPS code: 26-15340
- GNIS ID: 1626074
- Website: chesterfieldtwp.org

Chesterfield Charter Township is a charter township of Macomb County in the U.S. state of Michigan. As of the 2020 census the population was 45,376.

The township was organized in 1842, formed from a portion of Macomb Township. In 1989 it gained charter status. The township is part of Metro Detroit.

== History ==
Chesterfield Township was originally established as a general law township in 1842. It became a charter township in 1989.

The original European-American settlement in the area was a hamlet called Chesterfield, first settled in 1830. When the Grand Trunk Railway came through in 1865, it stimulated the development of businesses in the hamlet. It had a post office from 1875 until 1907, but has since lost its specific identity.

== Geography ==
Chesterfield Township is in eastern Macomb County and is bordered on the north by Lenox Township and the village of New Haven; on the east by Ira Township in St. Clair County, and by the village of New Baltimore; on the southeast by Anchor Bay, which is a part of Lake St. Clair; on the south by Harrison Township; and on the west by Macomb Township.

According to the United States Census Bureau, the township has a total area of 30.6 square miles (79 km^{2}), of which 27.6 square miles (71 km^{2}) are land and 3.0 square miles (7.8 km^{2}), or 9.85%, are water.

Much of Chesterfield Township is dominated by suburban subdivisions and shopping developments; its population is increasingly diverse, reflecting area demographic changes. In 2010 some 89% of the population identified as non-Hispanic whites; in the late 20th century, the largely rural township had an even higher percentage of whites. Anchor Bay influences the southeastern part of the community, where many pleasure boats, docks, and marine-related businesses can be found.

== Communities ==
There are nine unincorporated communities in the township and no incorporated villages:

- Anchor Bay Gardens is located off Jefferson Avenue at Sunrise Street and Jans Drive (42°38′34″N 82°48′45″W; Elevation: 571 ft./174 m.).
- Anchor Bay Harbor is located on Jefferson Avenue south of Anchor Bay Gardens, between Sugerbush and Cotton roads (42°39′19.1″N 82°47′56.7″W; Elevation: 577 ft./176 m.).
- Anchor Bay Shores is located off Jefferson Avenue, south of Anchor Bay Harbor between William P. Rosso Highway and 21 Mile Road (42°38′08″N 82°49′00″W; Elevation: 581 ft./177 m.)
- Chesterfield is located on M-3 from 23 Mile Road to 22 Mile Road. (42°39′46″N 82°50′33″W; Elevation: 607 ft./185 m.)
- Chesterfield Shores is near the border with City of New Baltimore north of Jefferson Avenue and south of M-29/23 Mile Road (42°40′12″N 82°45′41″W ; Elevation: 587 ft./179 m.).
- Fairchild was located in the southern portion of the township. It had a post office starting in 1906.
- Lottivue is located between Jefferson Avenue, Lake Saint Clair, Brandenburg Park and Schneider Road (42°39′34″N 82°45′43″W ; Elevation: 577 ft./176 m.).
- Milton is located at Gratiot Avenue and 24 Mile Road (42°41′21″N 82°49′19″W; Elevation: 607 ft./185 m.) and once was a station on the Grand Trunk Railroad. The first post office in the township was established here in 1837 in the house of Robert O. Milton, with the name of "New Haven Post Office". When this was moved to New Haven, Alfred D. Rice established another post office in Milton. That post office closed at some point, and another was opened in January 1856, with Edmund Matthews as postmaster. This office operated until July 1904. Milton was home to a school, three churches, a doctor, a blacksmith, and a couple of saloons. The last saloon survived until 2004, when it was torn down, at that time it was known as the "Teddy Bear Bar." The school, known as Milton School, was incorporated into another building, which was torn down in 2002.
- Point Lakeview is located southwest of Lottivue between the Salt River and Lake Saint Clair.
- Sebille Manor is located northwest of Anchor Bay Harbor between Sugarbush and Donner roads (42°39′40″N 82°48′44″W; Elevation: 587 ft./179 m.).

== Demographics ==
As of the 2020 census, Chesterfield Township had a population of 45,376. The racial and ethnic composition of the population was 38,322 (84.45%) non-Hispanic white, 2668 (5.88%) African American, 108 (0.24%) Native American, 496 (1.09%) Asian, 444 (0.98%) non-Hispanics from some other race, 2921 (6.44%) from two or more races, and 1,504 (3.31%) Hispanic or Latino.

As of the 2010 census Chesterfield Township had a population of 43,381. The racial and ethnic composition of the population was 89.5% non-Hispanic white, 5.3% African American, 0.4% Native American, 1.0% Asian, 0.1% non-Hispanics from some other race, 1.8% from two or more races, and 2.4% Hispanic or Latino.

As of the census of 2000, there were 37,405 people, 13,347 households, and 10,076 families residing in the township. The population density was 1,341.7 inhabitants per square mile (518.0/km^{2}). There were 13,967 housing units at an average density of 501.0 per square mile (193.4/km^{2}). The racial makeup of the township was 93.43% White, 2.97% African American, 0.40% Native American, 0.76% Asian, 0.02% Pacific Islander, 0.87% from other races, and 1.56% from two or more races. Hispanic or Latino of any race were 2.52% of the population.

There were 13,347 households, out of which 43.1% had children under the age of 18 living with them, 62.1% were married couples living together, 9.5% had a female householder with no husband present, and 24.5% were non-families. 19.2% of all households were made up of individuals, and 4.7% had someone living alone who was 65 years of age or older. The average household size was 2.78 and the average family size was 3.22.

In the township 29.8% of the population was under the age of 18, 7.9% from 18 to 24, 36.4% from 25 to 44, 19.3% from 45 to 64, and 6.6% was 65 years of age or older. The median age was 33 years. For every 100 females, there were 98.5 males. For every 100 females age 18 and over, there were 95.6 males.

The median income for a household in the township was $61,630, and the median income for a family was $69,554. Males had a median income of $50,834 versus $30,275 for females. The per capita income for the township was $24,410. About 3.9% of families and 4.7% of the population were below the poverty line, including 6.8% of those under age 18 and 3.8% of those age 65 or over.

== Government ==
The township is governed by a board of trustees and a township supervisor. A clerk and treasurer are also elected.

== Fire department ==
Chesterfield Township is served by a mix of career and part-time firefighters, under the direction of the Public Safety Director, and supervision of a full-time chief. The department staffs two stations 24/7.

== Education ==
Chesterfield Township is primarily covered by two school districts: the Anchor Bay School District, and L’Anse Creuse Public Schools. A small portion of the northern part of the township is also zoned to New Haven Community Schools.
