= Kerry Knuppe =

Native American actress, playwright, & screenwriter in film, television, & theatre

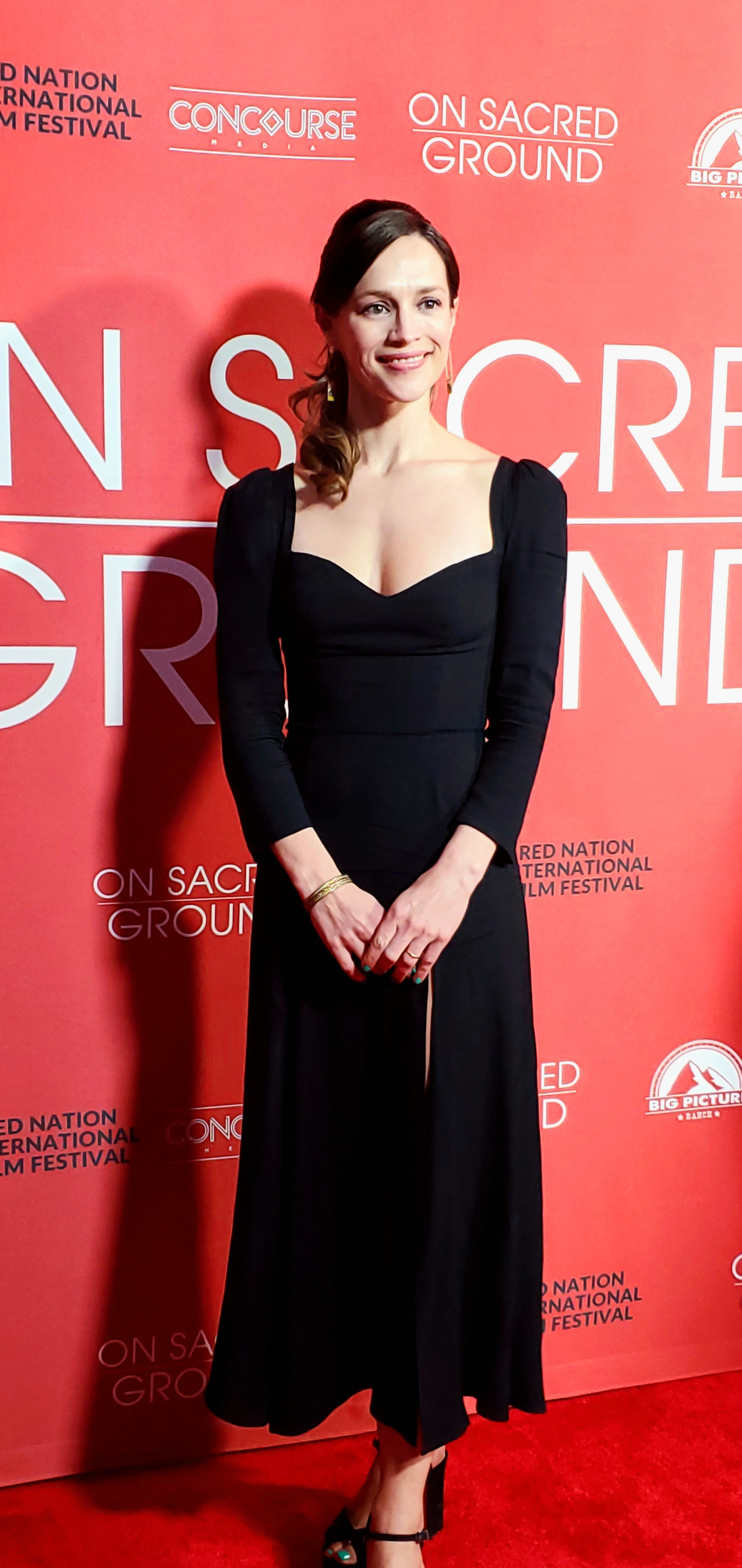
- Knuppe at the 2022 Red Nation Film Festival
- Born: South Dakota
- Occupations: Actress, playwright

Kerry Knuppe is a Native American (Oglala Lakota) actress, playwright, and screenwriter from the Pine Ridge Indian Reservation in South Dakota. In film, Knuppe is known for her roles in The Old Way, The Blind, R.I.P.D. 2: Rise of the Damned, On Sacred Ground, All Those Small Things, and Skills like This. In television, Knuppe is known for her roles in The Pitt, Criminal Minds: Evolution, Pachinko, Ratched, Hollywood, and Harley Quinn.

== Career ==
=== Theatre ===
Knuppe has written Morning View Drive, Family Plot, The Decision, and Ellie as a playwright. Knuppe's performances include portraying The Woman in Arthur Miller's Death of a Salesman with Rob Morrow at The Ruskin Group Theatre and portraying Laura Wingfield in Tennessee Williams' The Glass Menagerie at the Greenway Court Theatre. Knuppe is an Actors Studio lifetime member and continues to study at the Actors Studio West in Los Angeles. Knuppe was also selected for the Playwrights Lab at the Actors Studio West where she continues to develop her plays.

=== Film ===
Knuppe portrayed Ruth Briggs in the 2023 western The Old Way with Nicolas Cage and Ryan Kiera Armstrong. Knuppe portrays Hano in R.I.P.D. 2: Rise of the Damned with Jeffrey Donovan. Knuppe won the Outstanding Performance by an Actress in a Leading Role award at the 2022 Red Nation Film Festival for her performance in On Sacred Ground.

=== Television ===
Knuppe portrays Doris Mayfair in Ryan Murphy's Ratched and Sally in Murphy's Hollywood. Knuppe also portrays Hillary Edwards in The Pitt, Mrs. Holmes in Pachinko, Ramona Havener in Criminal Minds: Evolution, and voices Terra in the animated series Harley Quinn.
