= Ira Township, Michigan =

- Civil township
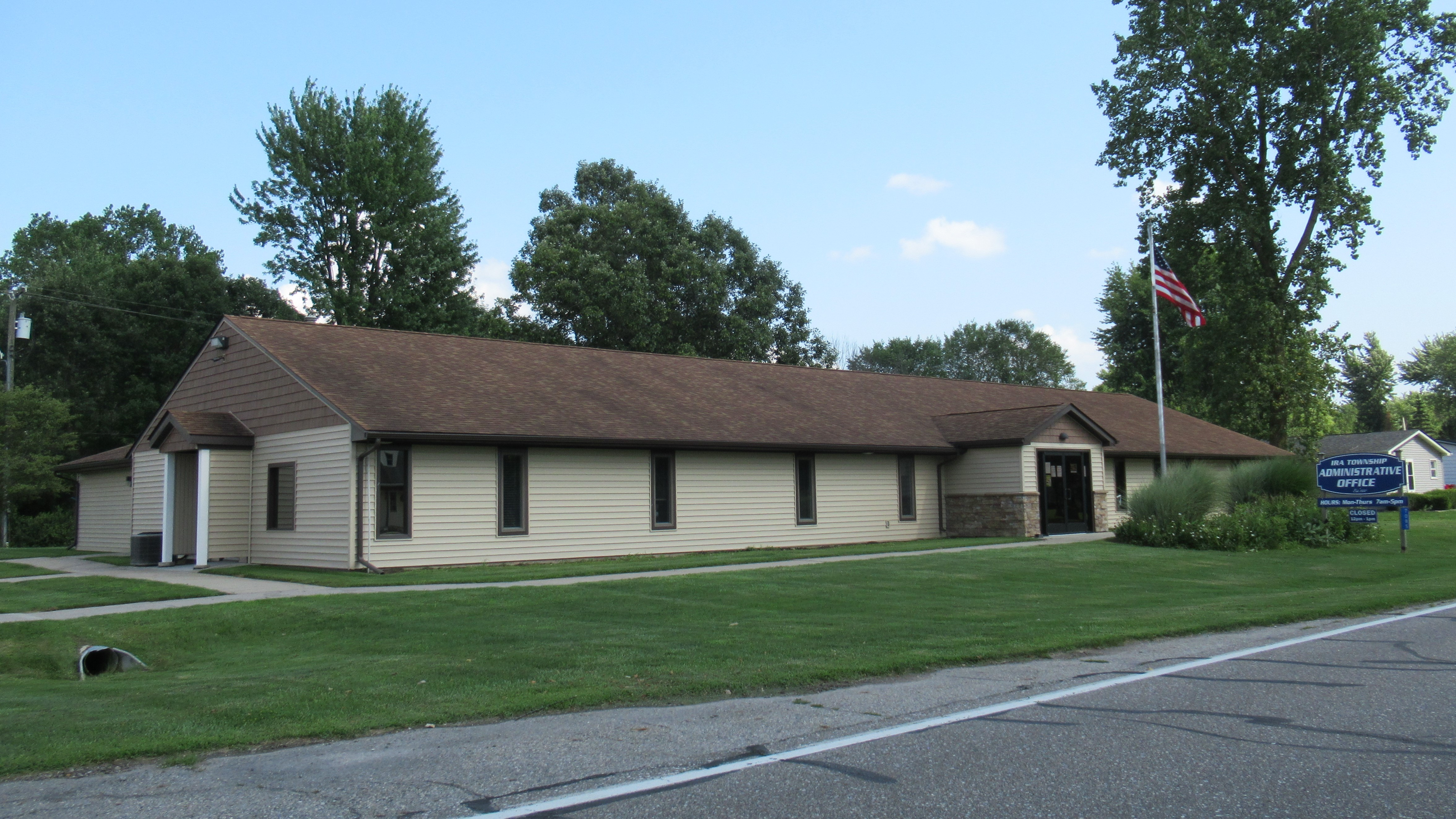
- Ira Township Administrative Office

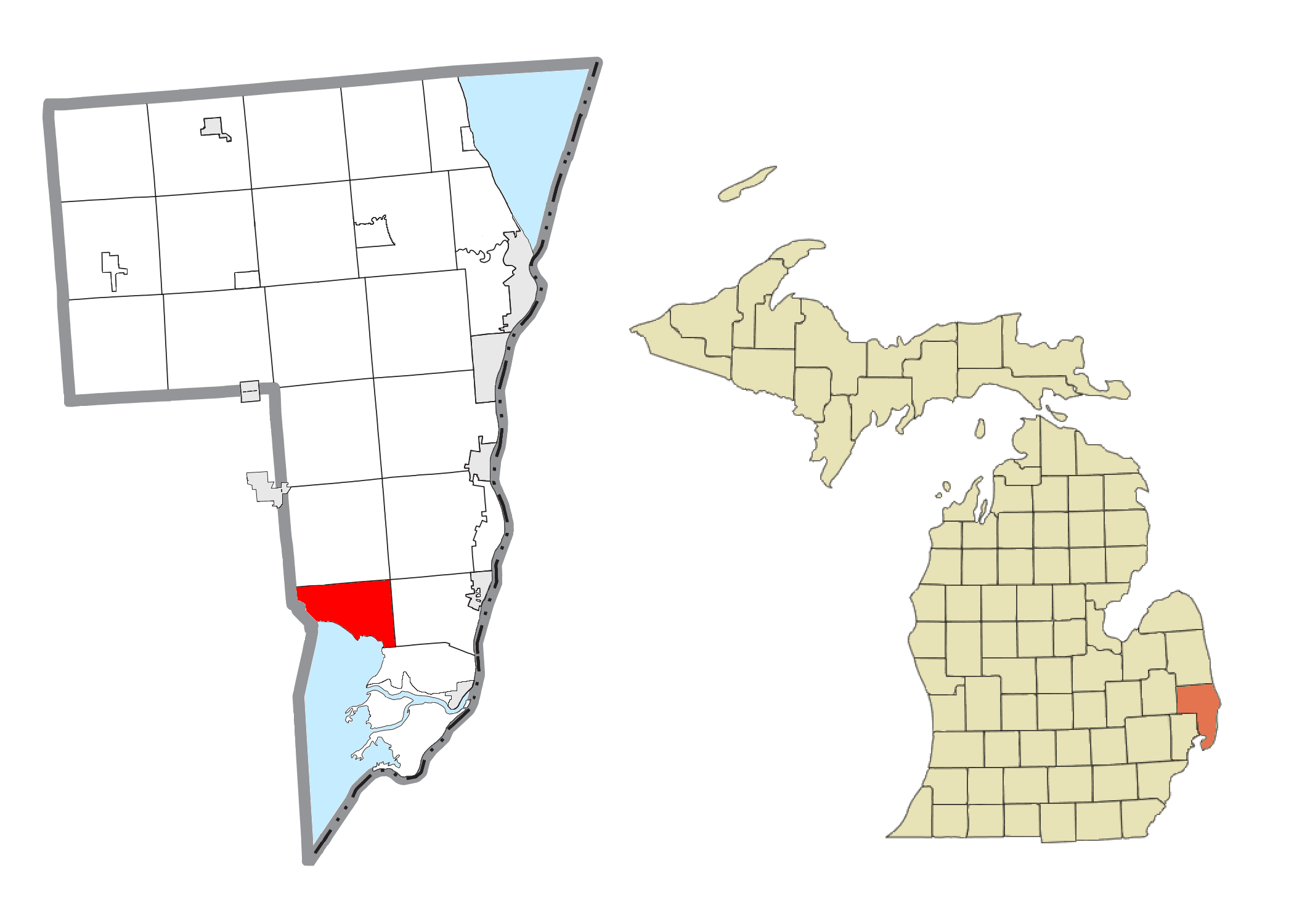
- Location within St. Clair County

- Location within the state of Michigan Location within the United States
- Coordinates: 42°41′38″N 82°40′07″W
- Country: United States
- State: Michigan
- County: St. Clair
- Established: 1837

Government
  - Supervisor: James Endres
  - Clerk: Jean Corbat

Area
  - Total: 21.63 sq mi (56.02 km^{2})
  - Land: 17.03 sq mi (44.11 km^{2})
  - Water: 4.60 sq mi (11.91 km^{2})
- Elevation: 587 ft (179 m)

Population (2020)
  - Total: 4,967
  - Density: 291.7/sq mi (112.6/km^{2})
- Time zone: UTC-5 (Eastern (EST))
  - Summer (DST): UTC-4 (EDT)
- ZIP code(s): 48004 (Anchorville); 48023 (Fair Haven); 48064 (Casco)
- Area code: 586
- FIPS code: 26-40920
- GNIS feature ID: 1626524
- Website: Official website

Ira Township is a civil township of St. Clair County in the U.S. state of Michigan. The population was 4,967 at the 2020 Census.

== Communities ==
Four unincorporated communities are within the township:

- Anchorville is on M-29 situated on northern shore of Lake St. Clair at 42°41′28″N 82°41′19″W. The Anchorville ZIP code 48004 provides P.O. Box service. The Rev. Charles Chambille arrived in 1853 to serve the French living in the area, which was then called the "Swan Creek Settlement." Chambille dedicated a church in 1854, which became the nucleus of a village. In 1876, it was renamed to describe its location on Anchor Bay. A post office was established in December 1885.
- Copeland Corner is on M-29 at Perch Road (42°40′21″N 82°37′21″W Elevation: 577 ft; 176 m).
- Fair Haven is about a mile and a half east-southeast of Anchorville on M-29 at 42°40′45″N 82°39′14″W. The Fairhaven ZIP code 48023 serves most of Ira Township. The community was the site of a French-speaking Metis settlement dating from before 1837 and named after the nearby stream, Rivière des Cygnes. This was translated by American settlers as Swan Creek and was given a post office with that name in October 1857. In February 1862, it was renamed Fair Haven.
- Perch Point is on M-29 at the southeast corner of Ira Township on the boundary with Clay Township at 42°39′54″N 82°37′13″W.

== History ==
The township was created in 1837 and was named for Ira Marks, an early settler. A post office named Ira was established at a settlement on the north shore of Lake St. Clair in May 1851 and operated until June 1853.

== Geography ==
According to the United States Census Bureau, the township has a total area of 21.6 square miles (56 km^{2}), of which 17.0 square miles (44 km^{2}) is land and 4.6 square miles (12 km^{2}) (21.42%) is water. Ira township is flat and rises slightly from the shoreline of Lake Saint Clair. Most of the township is rural and made up of woods, open space, and farms. The shoreline is developed along the Dixie Hwy which hugs the shore and there are small clusters of homes at Fair Haven and Anchorville. There is a small industrial area in the northwest section of the township. The primary tributary which is centered geographically is the Swan Creek which branches off to the east and west, out to the north of the township limits. The drainage area of these creeks is small but makes up most of the township's watershed. The shoreline is often sandy or has seawalls along private homes and the water is shallow near the land. There are a number of marshes in the township along the lake and the creeks.

== Demographics ==
As of the census of 2000, there were 6,966 people, 2,677 households, and 1,833 families residing in the township. The population density was 411.0 inhabitants per square mile (158.7/km^{2}). There were 2,871 housing units at an average density of 169.4 units per square mile (65.4 units/km^{2}). The racial makeup of the township was 96.87% White, 0.82% African American, 0.63% Native American, 0.26% Asian, 0.04% Pacific Islander, 0.32% from other races, and 1.06% from two or more races. Hispanic or Latino of any race were 1.26% of the population.

There were 2,677 households, out of which 35.8% had children under the age of 18 living with them, 51.5% were married couples living together, 11.9% had a female householder with no husband present, and 31.5% were non-families. 25.3% of all households were made up of individuals, and 7.0% had someone living alone who was 65 years of age or older. The average household size was 2.60 and the average family size was 3.12.

In the township the population was spread out, with 27.8% under the age of 18, 7.9% from 18 to 24, 33.5% from 25 to 44, 21.2% from 45 to 64, and 9.6% who were 65 years of age or older. The median age was 34 years. For every 100 females, there were 101.6 males. For every 100 females age 18 and over, there were 100.6 males.

The median income for a household in the township was $45,525, and the median income for a family was $49,741. Males had a median income of $43,472 versus $27,383 for females. The per capita income for the township was $22,115. About 7.8% of families and 9.4% of the population were below the poverty line, including 11.5% of those under age 18 and 8.6% of those age 65 or over.
