= List of accolades received by The Pitt =

Awards and nominations
Award	Wins	Nominations
AACTA Awards	0	2
AARP Movies for Grownups Awards	2	2
Actor Awards	2	2
American Cinema Editors Eddie Awards	1	1
American Film Institute Awards	1	1
Art Directors Guild Awards	0	1
Artios Awards	1	1
Astra Creative Arts Awards	3	3
Astra TV Awards	10	18
Black Reel Awards	0	8
Cinema Audio Society Awards	1	1
Critics' Choice Awards	3	4
Directors Guild of America Awards	1	2
Dorian Awards	2	12
Edinburgh International Television Festival	1	1
Film Independent Spirit Awards	0	2
Golden Globes	2	2
Golden Reel Awards	0	1
Golden Trailer Awards	1	1
Gotham TV Awards	1	3
NAACP Image Awards	1	1
Peabody Awards	1	1
Primetime Creative Arts Emmy Awards	7	20
Primetime Emmy Awards	5	19
Producers Guild of America Awards	1	1
Queerties Awards	1	2
Satellite Awards	0	2
Saturn Awards	0	1
Society of Camera Operators Awards	0	1
Television Critics Association Awards	5	8
Writers Guild of America Awards	3	3

Totals (Note: Certain award groups do not simply award one winner. They acknowledge several different recipients, have runners-up, and have third place. Since this is a specific recognition and is different from losing an award, runner-up mentions are considered wins in this award tally. For simplification and to avoid errors, each award in this list has been presumed to have had a prior nomination.)
- Wins: 56
- Nominations: 130

The Pitt is an American medical drama television series created by R. Scott Gemmill and executive produced by Noah Wyle and John Wells among others. Set in real time, each episode depicts approximately one hour at the emergency department of a fictional hospital in Pittsburgh, as the staff navigate a single 15-hour shift over the course of one season. The series stars Wyle, Tracy Ifeachor, Patrick Ball, Katherine LaNasa, Supriya Ganesh, Fiona Dourif, Taylor Dearden, Isa Briones, Gerran Howell, Shabana Azeez, and Sepideh Moafi. The first two episodes premiered on Max on January 9, 2025, with subsequent episodes being released weekly until April 2025. The second season was released weekly from January 8 to April 16, 2026.

The Pitt has been nominated for several awards, including 19 Primetime Emmy Awards (five wins), 20 Primetime Creative Arts Emmy Awards (seven wins), two Golden Globes (all won), four Critics' Choice Awards (three wins), two Actor Awards (all won), three Writers Guild of America Awards (all won), and one Peabody Award (won). Its first season won the Primetime Emmy Award, Golden Globe, Critics' Choice Award, and Writers Guild of America Award for Best Drama Series. Wyle won the Primetime Emmy Award, Golden Globe, Critics' Choice Award, and Actor Award for Best Actor in a Drama Series. LaNasa won the Primetime Emmy Award and Critics' Choice Award for Best Supporting Actress in a Drama Series.

== Awards and nominations ==
Award	Date(s) of ceremony	Category	Recipient(s)	Result	Ref.
AACTA Awards	February 6, 2026	Best Actor in a Series	Noah Wyle	Nominated	
AACTA Awards	February 6, 2026	Best Drama Series	The Pitt	Nominated	
AARP Movies for Grownups Awards	January 10, 2026	Best Actor (TV/Streaming)	Noah Wyle	Won	
AARP Movies for Grownups Awards	January 10, 2026	Best TV Series or Limited Series	The Pitt	Won	
Actor Awards	March 1, 2026	Outstanding Performance by a Male Actor in a Drama Series	Noah Wyle	Won	
Actor Awards	March 1, 2026	Outstanding Performance by an Ensemble in a Drama Series	Amielynn Abellera, Shabana Azeez, Patrick Ball, Isa Briones, Jalen Thomas Brooks, Taylor Dearden, Fiona Dourif, Supriya Ganesh, Joanna Going, Gerran Howell, Michael Hyatt, Tracy Ifeachor, Katherine LaNasa, Krystel V. McNeil, Brandon Mendez Homer, Alexandra Metz, Tracy Vilar, Kristin Villanueva, and Noah Wyle	Won	
American Cinema Editors Eddie Awards	February 27, 2026	Best Edited Drama Series	Mark Strand (for "6:00 P.M.")	Won	
American Film Institute Awards	January 9, 2026	Top 10 Television Programs of the Year	The Pitt	Won	
Art Directors Guild Awards	February 28, 2026	Excellence in Production Design for a One-Hour Contemporary Single-Camera Series	Nina Ruscio (for "7:00 A.M.")	Nominated	
Artios Awards	February 26, 2026	Television Pilot and First Season – Drama	Cathy Sandrich Gelfond and Seth Caskey	Won	
Astra Creative Arts Awards	December 11, 2025	Best Casting	The Pitt	Won	
Astra Creative Arts Awards	December 11, 2025	Best Editing	The Pitt	Won	
Astra Creative Arts Awards	December 11, 2025	Best Production Design	The Pitt	Won	
Astra TV Awards	June 10, 2025	Best Actor in a Drama Series	Noah Wyle	Won	
Astra TV Awards	June 10, 2025	Best Cast Ensemble in a Streaming Drama Series	The Pitt	Won	
Astra TV Awards	June 10, 2025	Best Directing in a Drama Series	John Wells (for "7:00 A.M.")	Nominated	
Astra TV Awards	June 10, 2025	Best Drama Series	The Pitt	Nominated	
Astra TV Awards	June 10, 2025	Best Supporting Actress in a Drama Series	Taylor Dearden	Nominated	
Astra TV Awards	June 10, 2025	Best Writing in a Drama Series	Joe Sachs and R. Scott Gemmill (for "7:00 P.M.")	Won	
Astra TV Awards	August 15, 2026	Best Actor in a Drama Series	Noah Wyle	Won	
Astra TV Awards	August 15, 2026	Best Directing in a Drama Series	Noah Wyle (for "12:00 P.M.")	Won	
Astra TV Awards	August 15, 2026	Best Drama Series	The Pitt	Won	
Astra TV Awards	August 15, 2026	Best Guest Actress in a Drama Series	Tal Anderson	Won	
Astra TV Awards	August 15, 2026	Best Streaming Drama Ensemble	The Pitt	Won	
Astra TV Awards	August 15, 2026	Best Supporting Actor in a Drama Series	Patrick Ball	Won	
Astra TV Awards	August 15, 2026	Best Supporting Actor in a Drama Series	Shawn Hatosy	Nominated	
Astra TV Awards	August 15, 2026	Best Supporting Actress in a Drama Series	Isa Briones	Nominated	
Astra TV Awards	August 15, 2026	Best Supporting Actress in a Drama Series	Taylor Dearden	Nominated	
Astra TV Awards	August 15, 2026	Best Supporting Actress in a Drama Series	Katherine LaNasa	Nominated	
Astra TV Awards	August 15, 2026	Best Supporting Actress in a Drama Series	Sepideh Moafi	Won	
Astra TV Awards	August 15, 2026	Best Writing in a Drama Series	Valerie Chu (for "12:00 P.M.")	Nominated	
Black Reel Awards	August 18, 2025	Outstanding Directing in a Drama Series	Damian Marcano (for "7:00 P.M.")	Nominated	
Black Reel Awards	August 18, 2025	Outstanding Supporting Performance in a Drama Series	Tracy Ifeachor	Nominated	
Black Reel Awards	August 18, 2025	Outstanding Writing in a Drama Series	Cynthia Adarkwa (for "12:00 P.M.")	Nominated	
Black Reel Awards	August 17, 2026	Outstanding Directing in a Drama Series	Damian Marcano (for "4:00 P.M.")	Nominated	
Black Reel Awards	August 17, 2026	Outstanding Guest Performance in a Drama Series	Ernest Harden Jr.	Nominated	
Black Reel Awards	August 17, 2026	Outstanding Guest Performance in a Drama Series	Ayesha Harris	Nominated	
Black Reel Awards	August 17, 2026	Outstanding Writing in a Drama Series	Kirsten Pierre-Geyfman & R. Scott Gemmill (for "1:00 P.M.")	Nominated	
Black Reel Awards	August 17, 2026	Outstanding Writing in a Drama Series	Cynthia Adarkwa (for "3:00 P.M.")	Nominated	
Cinema Audio Society Awards	March 7, 2026	Outstanding Achievement in Sound Mixing for Television Series – One Hour	Von Varga, Todd M. Grace, Edward C. Carr III, Tami Treadwell, and Alex Jongbloed (for "7:00 P.M.")	Won	
Critics' Choice Award	January 4, 2026	Best Actor in a Drama Series	Noah Wyle	Won	
Critics' Choice Award	January 4, 2026	Best Drama Series	The Pitt	Won	
Critics' Choice Award	January 4, 2026	Best Supporting Actor in a Drama Series	Patrick Ball	Nominated	
Critics' Choice Award	January 4, 2026	Best Supporting Actress in a Drama Series	Katherine LaNasa	Won	
Directors Guild of America Awards	February 7, 2026	Outstanding Directorial Achievement in Dramatic Series	Amanda Marsalis (for "6:00 P.M.")	Won	
Directors Guild of America Awards	February 7, 2026	Outstanding Directorial Achievement in Dramatic Series	John Wells (for "7:00 A.M.")	Nominated	
Dorian Awards	July 8, 2025	Best TV Drama	The Pitt	Won	
Dorian Awards	July 8, 2025	Best TV Performance – Drama	Noah Wyle	Won	
Dorian Awards	July 8, 2025	Best Supporting TV Performance — Drama	Taylor Dearden	Nominated	
Dorian Awards	July 8, 2025	Best Supporting TV Performance — Drama	Katherine LaNasa	Nominated	
Dorian Awards	July 8, 2025	Best Written TV Show	The Pitt	Nominated	
Dorian Awards	August 15, 2026	Best TV Drama	The Pitt	Nominated	
Dorian Awards	August 15, 2026	Best TV Performance – Drama	Noah Wyle	Nominated	
Dorian Awards	August 15, 2026	Best Supporting TV Performance – Drama	Patrick Ball	Nominated	
Dorian Awards	August 15, 2026	Best Supporting TV Performance – Drama	Isa Briones	Nominated	
Dorian Awards	August 15, 2026	Best Supporting TV Performance – Drama	Katherine LaNasa	Nominated	
Dorian Awards	August 15, 2026	Best Supporting TV Performance – Drama	Sepideh Moafi	Nominated	
Dorian Awards	August 15, 2026	Best Written TV Show	The Pitt	Nominated	
Edinburgh International Television Festival	August 27, 2026	Best International Drama	The Pitt	Won	
Film Independent Spirit Awards	February 15, 2026	Best Lead Performance in a New Scripted Series	Noah Wyle	Nominated	
Film Independent Spirit Awards	February 15, 2026	Best Supporting Performance in a New Scripted Series	Taylor Dearden	Nominated	
Golden Globes	January 11, 2026	Best Actor in a Television Series – Drama	Noah Wyle	Won	
Golden Globes	January 11, 2026	Best Television Series – Drama	The Pitt	Won	
Golden Reel Awards	March 8, 2026	Outstanding Achievement in Sound Editing – Series 1 Hour – Dialogue/ADR	Bryan Parker, Kristen Hirlinger, and Vince Tennant (for "7:00 P.M.")	Nominated	
Golden Trailer Awards	May 28, 2026	Best Drama Trailer for a TV/Streaming Series	"Return Trailer"	Won	
Gotham TV Awards	June 2, 2025	Breakthrough Drama Series	R. Scott Gemmill, Simran Baidwan, Michael Hissrich, Erin Jontow, John Wells, and Noah Wyle	Won	
Gotham TV Awards	June 2, 2025	Outstanding Lead Performance in a Drama Series	Noah Wyle	Nominated	
Gotham TV Awards	June 2, 2025	Outstanding Supporting Performance in a Drama Series	Katherine LaNasa	Nominated	
NAACP Image Awards	February 28, 2026	Outstanding Writing in a Dramatic Series	Cynthia Adarkwa (for "12:00 P.M.")	Won	
Peabody Awards	May 31, 2026	Entertainment	The Pitt	Won	
Primetime Creative Arts Emmy Awards	September 6–7, 2025	Outstanding Casting for a Drama Series	Cathy Sandrich Gelfond and Erica Berger	Won	
Primetime Creative Arts Emmy Awards	September 6–7, 2025	Outstanding Contemporary Makeup (Non-Prosthetic)	Merry Lee Traum, Marie-Flore "Ri" Beaubien, and Leese Simone (for "7:00 P.M.")	Nominated	
Primetime Creative Arts Emmy Awards	September 6–7, 2025	Outstanding Guest Actor in a Drama Series	Shawn Hatosy (for "9:00 P.M.")	Won	
Primetime Creative Arts Emmy Awards	September 6–7, 2025	Outstanding Prosthetic Makeup	Myriam Arougheti, Thom Floutz, Chris Burgoyne, and Martina Sykes (for "4:00 P.M.")	Nominated	
Primetime Creative Arts Emmy Awards	September 6–7, 2025	Outstanding Sound Editing for a Comedy or Drama Series (One Hour)	Bryan Parker, Kristen Hirlinger, Vince Tennant, Josh Adeniji, Roland Thai, and Sam Lewis (for "7:00 P.M.")	Nominated	
Primetime Creative Arts Emmy Awards	September 6–7, 2025	Outstanding Sound Mixing for a Comedy or Drama Series (One hour)	Todd M. Grace, Ed C, Carr III, Von Varga, and Tami Treadwell (for "6:00 P.M.")	Nominated	
Primetime Creative Arts Emmy Awards	September 5–6, 2026	Outstanding Casting for a Drama Series	Cathy Sandrich Gelfond, Erica Berger, and Seth Caskey	Won	
Primetime Creative Arts Emmy Awards	September 5–6, 2026	Outstanding Contemporary Makeup (Non-Prosthetic)	Merry Lee Traum, Marie Flore "Ri" Beaubien, and Leesa Simone (for "1:00 P.M.")	Nominated	
Primetime Creative Arts Emmy Awards	September 5–6, 2026	Outstanding Guest Actor in a Drama Series	Ernest Harden Jr. (for "7:00 A.M.")	Won	
Primetime Creative Arts Emmy Awards	September 5–6, 2026	Outstanding Guest Actor in a Drama Series	Jeff Kober (for "8:00 P.M.")	Nominated	
Primetime Creative Arts Emmy Awards	September 5–6, 2026	Outstanding Guest Actress in a Drama Series	Brittany Allen (for "3:00 P.M.")	Nominated	
Primetime Creative Arts Emmy Awards	September 5–6, 2026	Outstanding Guest Actress in a Drama Series	Tal Anderson (for "5:00 P.M.")	Nominated	
Primetime Creative Arts Emmy Awards	September 5–6, 2026	Outstanding Guest Actress in a Drama Series	Tina Ivlev (for "1:00 P.M.")	Nominated	
Primetime Creative Arts Emmy Awards	September 5–6, 2026	Outstanding Original Music and Lyrics	Gavin Brivik and Andrew Bird (for "Need Someone" in "12:00 P.M.")	Won	
Primetime Creative Arts Emmy Awards	September 5–6, 2026	Outstanding Picture Editing for a Drama Series	Tamara Luciano (for "1:00 P.M.")	Nominated	
Primetime Creative Arts Emmy Awards	September 5–6, 2026	Outstanding Picture Editing for a Drama Series	Mark Strand (for "9:00 P.M.")	Nominated	
Primetime Creative Arts Emmy Awards	September 5–6, 2026	Outstanding Production Design for a Narrative Contemporary Program (One Hour or More)	Nina Ruscio, Josh Lusby, and Matt Callahan (for "9:00 P.M.")	Nominated	
Primetime Creative Arts Emmy Awards	September 5–6, 2026	Outstanding Prosthetic Makeup	Myriam Arougheti, Arjen Tuiten, Thom Floutz, Chris Burgoyne, Martina Sykes, and Hanny Tjan (for "9:00 P.M.")	Won	
Primetime Creative Arts Emmy Awards	September 5–6, 2026	Outstanding Short Form Nonfiction or Reality Series	Inside the Pitt	Won	
Primetime Creative Arts Emmy Awards	September 5–6, 2026	Outstanding Sound Mixing for a Comedy or Drama Series (One Hour)	Todd Grace, Edward C. Carr III, Von Varga, Tami Treadwell, and Alex Jongbloed (for "8:00 P.M.")	Nominated	
Primetime Emmy Awards	September 14, 2025	Outstanding Directing for a Drama Series	Amanda Marsalis (for "6:00 P.M.")	Nominated	
Primetime Emmy Awards	September 14, 2025	Outstanding Directing for a Drama Series	John Wells (for "7:00 A.M.")	Nominated	
Primetime Emmy Awards	September 14, 2025	Outstanding Drama Series	R. Scott Gemmill, John Wells, Noah Wyle, Michael Hissrich, Erin Jontow, Simran Baidwan, Joe Sachs, Terri Murphy, Amanda Marsalis, Damian Marcano, Cynthia Adarkwa, and Michelle Lankwarden	Won	
Primetime Emmy Awards	September 14, 2025	Outstanding Lead Actor in a Drama Series	Noah Wyle (for "9:00 P.M.")	Won	
Primetime Emmy Awards	September 14, 2025	Outstanding Supporting Actress in a Drama Series	Katherine LaNasa (for "9:00 P.M.")	Won	
Primetime Emmy Awards	September 14, 2025	Outstanding Writing for a Drama Series	R. Scott Gemmill (for "7:00 A.M.")	Nominated	
Primetime Emmy Awards	September 14, 2025	Outstanding Writing for a Drama Series	Joe Sachs (for "2:00 P.M.")	Nominated	
Primetime Emmy Awards	September 14, 2026	Outstanding Directing for a Drama Series	Noah Wyle (for "12:00 P.M.")	Nominated	
Primetime Emmy Awards	September 14, 2026	Outstanding Drama Series	The Pitt	Won	
Primetime Emmy Awards	September 14, 2026	Outstanding Lead Actor in a Drama Series	Noah Wyle (for "9:00 P.M.")	Won	
Primetime Emmy Awards	September 14, 2026	Outstanding Supporting Actor in a Drama Series	Patrick Ball (for "8:00 P.M.")	Nominated	
Primetime Emmy Awards	September 14, 2026	Outstanding Supporting Actor in a Drama Series	Shawn Hatosy (for "9:00 P.M.")	Nominated	
Primetime Emmy Awards	September 14, 2026	Outstanding Supporting Actor in a Drama Series	Gerran Howell (for "7:00 P.M.")	Nominated	
Primetime Emmy Awards	September 14, 2026	Outstanding Supporting Actress in a Drama Series	Taylor Dearden (for "5:00 P.M.")	Nominated	
Primetime Emmy Awards	September 14, 2026	Outstanding Supporting Actress in a Drama Series	Fiona Dourif (for "5:00 P.M.")	Nominated	
Primetime Emmy Awards	September 14, 2026	Outstanding Supporting Actress in a Drama Series	Katherine LaNasa (for "1:00 P.M.")	Nominated	
Primetime Emmy Awards	September 14, 2026	Outstanding Supporting Actress in a Drama Series	Sepideh Moafi (for "9:00 P.M.")	Nominated	
Primetime Emmy Awards	September 14, 2026	Outstanding Writing for a Drama Series	Valerie Chu (for "12:00 P.M.")	Nominated	
Primetime Emmy Awards	September 14, 2026	Outstanding Writing for a Drama Series	Kirsten Pierre-Geyfman and R. Scott Gemmill (for "1:00 P.M.")	Nominated	
Producers Guild of America Awards	February 28, 2026	Norman Felton Award for Outstanding Producer of Episodic Television – Drama	The Pitt	Won	
Queerties	March 10, 2026	TV Drama	The Pitt	Runner-up	
Queerties	March 10, 2026	TV Performance	Supriya Ganesh	Nominated	
Satellite Awards	March 10, 2026	Best Actor – Television Series Drama	Noah Wyle	Nominated	
Satellite Awards	March 10, 2026	Best Television Series – Drama	The Pitt	Nominated	
Saturn Awards	March 8, 2026	Best Television Presentation or Limited Series	The Pitt	Nominated	
Society of Camera Operators Awards	March 7, 2026	Camera Operator of the Year – Television	Erdem Ertal (for "6:00 P.M." with Aymae Sulick)	Nominated	
Television Critics Association Awards	August 20, 2025	Individual Achievement in Drama	Noah Wyle	Won	
Television Critics Association Awards	August 20, 2025	Program of the Year	The Pitt	Won	
Television Critics Association Awards	August 20, 2025	Outstanding Achievement in Drama	The Pitt	Won	
Television Critics Association Awards	August 20, 2025	Outstanding New Program	The Pitt	Won	
Television Critics Association Awards	August 20, 2026	Individual Achievement in Drama	Katherine LaNasa	Nominated	
Television Critics Association Awards	August 20, 2026	Individual Achievement in Drama	Noah Wyle	Nominated	
Television Critics Association Awards	August 20, 2026	Program of the Year	The Pitt	Nominated	
Television Critics Association Awards	August 20, 2026	Outstanding Achievement in Drama	The Pitt	Won	
Writers Guild of America Awards	March 8, 2026	Dramatic Series	Cynthia Adarkwa, Simran Baidwan, Valerie Chu, R. Scott Gemmill, Elyssa Gershman, Joe Sachs, Noah Wyle	Won	
Writers Guild of America Awards	March 8, 2026	Television: New Series	Cynthia Adarkwa, Simran Baidwan, Valerie Chu, R. Scott Gemmill, Elyssa Gershman, Joe Sachs, Noah Wyle	Won	
Writers Guild of America Awards	March 8, 2026	Television: Episodic Drama	R. Scott Gemmill (for "7:00 A.M.")	Won	

== Total awards and nominations ==
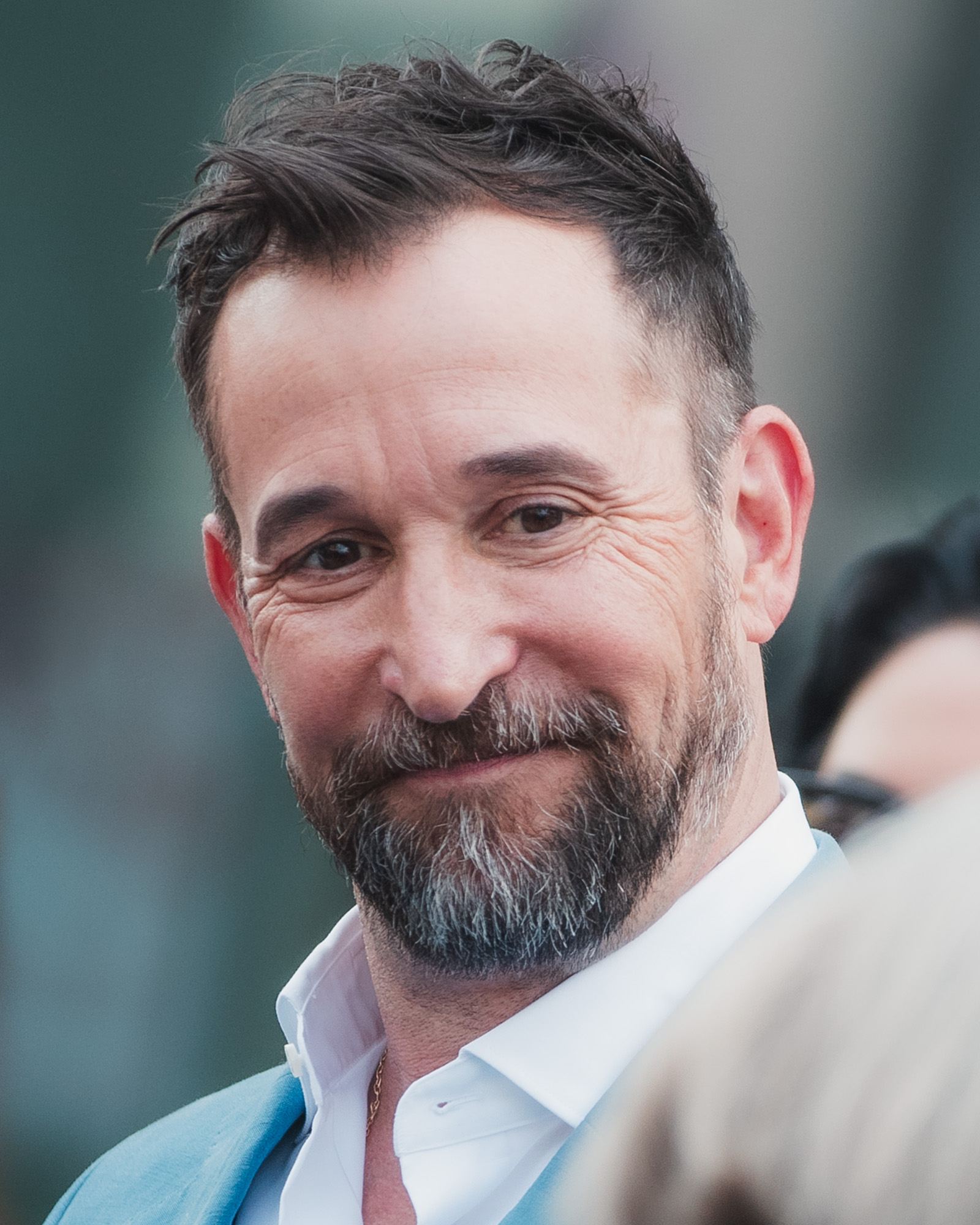
Noah Wyle won 16 awards for the series.

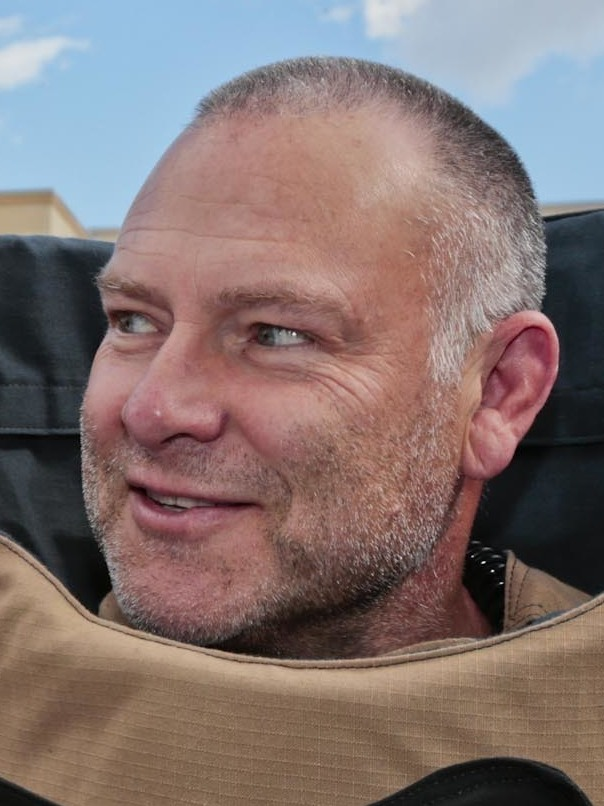
R. Scott Gemmill won six awards for the series.

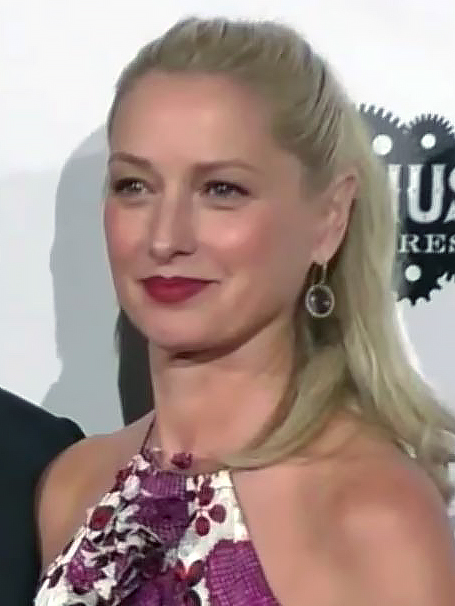
Katherine LaNasa received nine nominations for the series.

List of total awards and nominations for the cast and crew
Name	Role	Nominations	Awards
Noah Wyle	Actor, director, writer, executive producer	23	16
R. Scott Gemmill	Creator, director, writer, executive producer	9	6
Katherine LaNasa	Actress	9	3
Cynthia Adarkwa	Writer, supervising producer	6	4
Taylor Dearden	Actress	6	1
Joe Sachs	Writer, executive producer	5	4
Patrick Ball	Actor	5	2
John Wells	Director, executive producer	5	2
Simran Baidwan	Writer, executive producer	4	4
Valerie Chu	Writer	4	2
Cathy Sandrich Gelfond	Casting director	3	3
Amanda Marsalis	Director	3	2
Isa Briones	Actress	3	1
Edward C. Carr III	Re-recording mixer	3	1
Todd Grace	Re-recording mixer	3	1
Shawn Hatosy	Actor	3	1
Damian Marcano	Director, co-executive producer	3	1
Sepideh Moafi	Actress	3	1
Tami Treadwell	ADR mixer	3	1
Von Varga	Production mixer	3	1
Erica Berger	Casting director	2	2
Seth Caskey	Associate casting director	2	2
Michael Hissrich	Executive producer	2	2
Erin Jontow	Executive producer	2	2
Tal Anderson	Actress	2	1
Myriam Arougheti	Department head makeup artist	2	1
Chris Burgoyne	Special makeup effects artist	2	1
Fiona Dourif	Actress	2	1
Thom Floutz	Special makeup effects artist	2	1
Supriya Ganesh	Actress	2	1
Ernest Harden Jr.	Actor	2	1
Gerran Howell	Actor	2	1
Tracy Ifeachor	Actress	2	1
Alex Jongbloed	Foley mixer	2	1
Mark Strand	Editor	2	1
Martina Sykes	Special makeup effects artist	2	1
Marie-Flore "Ri" Beaubien	Makeup artist	2	0
Kristen Hirlinger	Dialogue editor	2	0
Bryan Parker	Supervising sound editor	2	0
Kirsten Pierre-Geyfman	Writer	2	0
Nina Ruscio	Production designer	2	0
Leese Simone	Makeup artist	2	0
Vince Tennant	ADR editor	2	0
Merry Lee Traum	Key makeup artist	2	0
