= Need Someone =

Need Someone may refer to:

- "Need Someone", a song from The Pitt television episode "12:00 P.M.", 2026
- "Need Someone", a song by Zara Larsson from the album Poster Girl, 2021
- "I Need Someone", a song by The Belmonts
