= 1:00 P.M. (The Pitt season 2) =

- The Pitt episode
- Episode no.: Season 2 Episode 7
- Directed by: Uta Briesewitz
- Written by: Kirsten Pierre-Geyfman; R. Scott Gemmill
- Cinematography by: Johanna Coelho
- Editing by: Tamara Luciano
- Production code: T76.10207
- Original air date: February 19, 2026
- Running time: 53 minutes

Guest appearances
- Shawn Hatosy as Dr. Jack Abbot (special guest star); Amielynn Abellera as Perlah Alawi; Brandon Mendez Homer as Donnie Donahue; Kristin Villanueva as Princess; Brittany Allen as Roxie Hamler; Usman Ally as Raymond Javadi; Lesley Boone as Lena Handzo; Irene Choi as Dr. Joy Kwon; Erin Croom as Jayda Davis; Jessica "Limer" Flores as Harlow Graham; Taylor Handley as Paul Hamler; Ernest Harden Jr. as Louie Cloverfield; Ayesha Harris as Dr. Parker Ellis; Laëtitia Hollard as Emma Nolan; Lucas Iverson as James Ogilvie; Tina Ivlev as Ilana Miller; Alexandra Metz as Dr. Yolanda Garcia; Zack Morris as Jackson Davis; Victor Rivas Rivers as Trent Norris; Christopher Thornton as Dr. Caleb Jefferson; Tracy Vilar as Lupe Perez; Moshe Kasher as Jacob Samuel

Episode chronology
← Previous "12:00 P.M."	Next → "2:00 P.M."

"1:00 P.M." is the seventh episode of the second season of the American medical drama television series The Pitt. It is the 22nd overall episode of the series and was written by Kirsten Pierre-Geyfman and series creator R. Scott Gemmill, and directed by co-executive producer Uta Briesewitz. It was released on HBO Max on February 19, 2026.

The series is set in Pittsburgh, following the staff of the Pittsburgh Trauma Medical Center (nicknamed "The Pitt") during a 15-hour emergency department shift. The series mainly follows Dr. Michael "Robby" Robinavitch, a senior attending still reeling from some traumas. In the episode, Abbot arrives to help with an injured friend, while Dana helps a sexual assault victim with medical exams.

The episode earned critical acclaim, with critics praising the episode's cases, themes, writing, and performances.

Katherine LaNasa and Tina Ivlev submitted the episode to support their Emmy nominations for Outstanding Supporting Actress in a Drama Series and Outstanding Guest Actress in a Drama Series, respectively.

== Plot ==
The staff return to the emergency department after sharing memories about Louie's life. As the sole Sexual Assault Nurse Examiner on site, Dana administers forensic exams and collects photographic evidence from Ilana Miller as part of a rape kit. Dana has Emma assist with the examination and connects Ilana with a Pittsburgh Action Against Rape representative.

Santos tries to communicate with Harlow through video remote interpreting, but the equipment malfunctions mid-conversation. McKay and Robby try to convince Roxie to return home in the care of her husband Paul, much to Roxie's resistance. Javadi and Al-Hashimi explain to Jackson's parents that their son is on an involuntary psychiatric hold. Al-Hashimi dissociates during the discussion and excuses herself. She calls the Pittsburgh Neuroscience Group to schedule a last-minute appointment. Jefferson asks Jackson's parents about potential family history of mental illness, with Jackson's father revealing that his brother took his own life. Jada is upset that they hid this information from her.

Abbot arrives with SWAT Officer Hiro, who was shot while defending a warehouse robbery. While treating Hiro's respiratory failure, the doctors discover a splenic injury and sends him to surgery. Robby then prepares to receive a patient brought in via helicopter; Langdon follows in pursuit. Langdon apologizes for stealing medication. Robby praises Langdon for seeking help for his substance abuse, but implies that he does not want him working in the ER. This affects Langdon's focus while he, Robby, and Garcia tend to their patient who was severely injured by a boat propeller.

Mohan attempts to stop Orlando from fleeing the hospital, causing Orlando to admit his $100,000 medical debt unbeknownst to his wife. Mohan convinces him to stay by promising supplies for his at-home care. However, Orlando still leaves without Mohan's provided supplies. Mohan instead finds Abbot treating his gunshot wound from the SWAT mission. Abbot offers to pay a car service to send the supplies to Orlando's home. Mohan helps Abbot with his wound when he requests his injury go unreported.

Santos reveals to Robby that Whitaker has been spending time with a widow of a previous patient, but worries the widow is taking advantage of him. Santos tries to catch up with charting when she is distracted by the cries of the abandoned baby. Santos sings "Ili Ili Tulog Anay" and successfully calms down the baby, affectionately referred to as Baby Jane Doe.

Dana prepares the gynaecological swab for Ilana, having the latter lie down in a lithotomy position. This triggers Ilana to refuse continuing exams for the rape kit. Dana allows her to take a break.

The hospital's CEO Trent Norris arrives to inform staff that Westbridge and another hospital are under a cyberattack. He also announces that the Pitt will temporarily go analog by shutting down all computer systems and telecommunication as a precaution. Robby is frustrated by the news and orders staff to prepare, mere seconds before the patient board shuts off.

== Production ==
=== Development ===
The episode was written by Kirsten Pierre-Geyfman and series creator R. Scott Gemmill, and directed by co-executive producer Uta Briesewitz. It marked Pierre-Geyfman's first writing credit, Gemmill's ninth writing credit, and Briesewitz's second directing credit.

=== Writing ===
Shawn Hatosy returns as Dr. Jack Abbot in the episode, reprising his role from season 1. Hatosy said that Abbot's presence would help move a plot point from the first season, saying, "[Abbot] tries to tell Robby that maybe he should talk to a therapist, so I think as we come into Season 2, we're definitely going to be checking in on that to make sure that the toll that this job is taking on Robby isn't going to be too much." Regarding the conversation between Abbot and Mohan, Supriya Ganesh explained, "I think that dynamic is just really fun to play with. I think when we were doing the scene, it was really interesting because it feels like really that moment when he offers to pay for the Uber is really when they connect for the first time, maybe, because that's like him really seeing her."

Regarding the sexual assault case in the episode, R. Scott Gemmill felt it was essential to show the procedures taken for medical tests, "I think for us it was an important story to tell. Obviously, it's a very prevalent problem. And I don't think we've ever really seen what somebody has to go through in that process immediately after. It takes a lot of bravery." To help construct a realistic portrayal of the exam process, the crew worked with consultants, including the UCLA Health Rape Treatment Center and Pittsburgh Action Against Rape. To prepare for the scene, Katherine LaNasa attended the Center to practice the exams needed for the episode, saying "I went back a second time because I knew I was going to have to use the kit... I wanted it to look like I had used the kit many times and I knew what I was doing."

== Reception ==
=== Reviews ===
"1:00 P.M." received critical acclaim. Jesse Schedeen of IGN gave the episode an "amazing" 9 out of 10 rating and wrote in his verdict, "The Pitt bounces back from a relatively (emphasis on relatively) weaker Episode 6 with another winner in Episode 7. This new chapter amps up the drama in the ER considerably with a new crop of compelling medical cases and some much-needed progress on older ones. This episode also benefits from some especially strong performances from the likes of Katherine LaNasa, Patrick Ball, and Isa Briones. As Season 2 nears the halfway mark, things are eating up both literally and figuratively."

Caroline Siede of The A.V. Club gave the episode a "B+" grade and wrote, "Like most episodes of The Pitt, '1:00 P.M.' is filled with gruesome injuries and ongoing medical mysteries. But — building off the staff's lovely eulogy for Louie — it's the power of communication that truly takes center stage this week. In the most literal sense, our deaf patient is dealing with the logistical nightmare of not being able to properly communicate with her doctors when the hospital's video relay interpreter system glitches. But there are tons of other nuances of communication at play too."

Maggie Fremont of Vulture gave the episode a 4 star rating out of 5 and wrote, "The Pitt is giving the people what they want. We got a second season within a year of the first one ending. Its gross-out factor continues to delight. Dana's accent rules the ER and our hearts. And here in the seventh episode, another gift: We don't have to wait until the night shift or some major catastrophe strikes PTMC to run into Dr. Abbot. It's 1 p.m. and he has already strolled on in to the ER."

Johnny Loftus of Decider wrote, "We believe in Langdon's contrition, and his recommitment to the work. But Robby's stubbornness is entrenched. It's personal between them, but professional, too, as we see elsewhere, when the senior attending takes time to encourage Mel that she did nothing wrong, that her deposition will go fine." Adam Patla of Tell-Tale TV gave the episode a 4.7 star rating out of 5 and wrote, "In a big ensemble, it can be tricky to juggle the numerous stories weaving in and out; however, '1:00 PM' takes these seemingly innocuous beats to push the characters deeper. It admirably doesn't rely on one big 'ah-ha' moment. Rather, The Pitt allows the development to play out in the everyday."

Sean T. Collins of The New York Times wrote, "For the foreseeable future, the Pitt is going analog. I would ask, 'What could go wrong?' But this is The Pitt, where the answer is always 'anything and everything.'" Jasmine Blu of TV Fanatic gave the episode a 4.5 star rating out of 5 and wrote, "If you're still reeling from Louie's death, you barely have time to catch your breath before a fresh wave of diversion patients storms in on The Pitt Season 2 Episode 7. Yes, it's into the afternoon of this hectic Fourth of July shift, and it has show no signs of slowing down."

=== Accolades ===
Award	Category	Nominee(s)	Result	Ref.
Primetime Emmy Awards	Outstanding Supporting Actress in a Drama Series	Katherine LaNasa	Nominated	
Primetime Emmy Awards	Outstanding Writing for a Drama Series	Kirsten Pierre-Geyfman and R. Scott Gemmill	Pending	
Primetime Creative Arts Emmy Awards	Outstanding Guest Actress in a Drama Series	Tina Ivlev	Nominated	
Primetime Creative Arts Emmy Awards	Outstanding Contemporary Makeup (Non-Prosthetic)	Merry Lee Traum, Marie Flore "Ri" Beaubien, and Leesa Simone	Nominated	
Primetime Creative Arts Emmy Awards	Outstanding Picture Editing for a Drama Series	Tamara Luciano	Nominated	
