= 3:00 P.M. (The Pitt season 2) =

- The Pitt episode
- Episode no.: Season 2 Episode 9
- Directed by: Shawn Hatosy
- Written by: Cynthia Adarkwa
- Cinematography by: Johanna Coelho
- Editing by: Mark Strand
- Production code: T76.10209
- Original air date: March 5, 2026
- Running time: 49 minutes

Guest appearances
- Shawn Hatosy as Dr. Jack Abbot (special guest star); Amielynn Abellera as Perlah Alawi; Brandon Mendez Homer as Donnie Donahue; Kristin Villanueva as Princess; Brittany Allen as Roxie Hamler; Tal Anderson as Becca King; Charles Baker as Troy Digby; Becca Blackwell as Dylan Easton; Lesley Boone as Lena Handzo; Clare Carey as Lauren Milford; Irene Choi as Dr. Joy Kwon; Sasha Compère as Chantal Augustin; Bonita Friedericy as Cora Wilkins; John Getz as Lloyd Wilkins; Taylor Handley as Paul Hamler; Laëtitia Hollard as Emma Nolan; Lucas Iverson as James Ogilvie; Charrell Mack as Amaya; Alexandra Metz as Dr. Yolanda Garcia; Rusty Schwimmer as Monica Peters; Craig Ricci Shaynak as Howard Knox; Tracy Vilar as Lupe Perez; Johnath Davis as Ahmad; Briana Burnside as Jackie Liddell; Ned Brower as Jesse Van Horn; Alison Haislip as Morgan Stiles; Elizabeth Hinkler as Iris Hewett; Anthony B. Jenkins as Jude Augustin; Adam Shaukat as Dr. Nick Barker; Johnny Sneed as Austin Green

Episode chronology
← Previous "2:00 P.M."	Next → "4:00 P.M."

"3:00 P.M." is the ninth episode of the second season of the American medical drama television series The Pitt. It is the 24th overall episode of the series and was written by supervising producer Cynthia Adarkwa, and directed by Shawn Hatosy. It was released on HBO Max on March 5, 2026.

The series is set in Pittsburgh, following the staff of the Pittsburgh Trauma Medical Hospital ER (nicknamed "The Pitt") during a 15-hour emergency department shift. The series mainly follows Dr. Michael "Robby" Robinavitch, a senior attending still reeling from some traumas. In the episode, the ER staff addresses multiple core problems regarding the analog systems, while Javadi deals with the repercussions of a severe mistake.

The episode earned highly positive reviews from critics, who praised the performances, Hatosy's direction and character development.

Brittany Allen was nominated the Primetime Emmy Award for Outstanding Guest Actress in a Drama Series for her performance in this episode.

== Plot ==
One hour into going analog, the staff takes measures to address inefficiencies in their system: Al-Hashimi brings radiologist Dr. Nick Barker to the ER to help with projectional radiography, while Dana calls in retired clerk Monica Peters to help with administrative duties.

Robby and Santos tend to Jude Augustin, a 12-year-old boy who lost two fingers after a firecracker exploded in his hand. Santos tells Robby she smells alcohol in his breath, which triggers the intervention of social services. Jude's legal guardian, his older sister Chantal, reveals that their parents were deported to Haiti nine months ago, and between college and a full-time job she is overwhelmed. Though social worker Dylan believes family services will not want to separate the two, he suggests that Jude might ultimately be better off with his parents, to Santos's dismay.

Mel's sister Becca arrives at the hospital complaining of a stomachache, right as Mel is called for her deposition hearing. Robby assigns Langdon to examine Becca, whom he later diagnoses with a urinary tract infection, while Santos picks up the rest of Mel's patients.

Santos and Joy check on Iris Hewett, who suffered heat exhaustion while attending Anthrocon in a fursuit. McKay and Whitaker take care of Amaya, a patient with polyendocrine metabolic ovarian syndrome (PMOS) who notes her history of being misdiagnosed due to unconscious bias toward black women. After repeated worsening pain, a transvaginal ultrasound reveals ovarian torsion requiring surgery. McKay has a somber conversation with Roxie about death and not getting any more time with her sons.

Javadi, still confused about the charting system, neglects to write patient Claire Burns's information on the board, resulting in her lab work becoming lost. When she is found unresponsive, Robby and Whitaker resuscitate her as Javadi panics. They track down her X-ray and realize she suffers from sigmoid volvulus, requiring urgent major surgery. Garcia sharply reprimands Javadi for her mistake and noting that her mother, Dr. Shamsi, will be the one to perform the surgery. Javadi, believing her delayed diagnosis nearly caused Mrs. Burns's death, is shaken despite Whitaker's attempts to reassure her.

Howard Knox returns with Abbot after his CT scan at UPMC Presbyterian. He has to undergo immediate high-risk surgery with 50% mortality rate after his abscess diverticulitis is found to have perforated. Before consenting, Howard requests to speak with his sister Lauren Milford, and they have an emotional conversation after years without contact. With Abbot heading home to get some sleep before his shift, Robby says goodbye in case they don't see each other before he takes his sabbatical. Abbot urges Robby to call him if he experiences any dark thoughts, which Robby does not respond to.

Whitaker's new nametag finally arrives, which Robby delivers to him in the break room. The two discuss Amy, the widow of a burn victim Whitaker treated on his first shift; he has been spending his weekends helping out at her farm. Robby commends Whitaker's compassion but stresses the importance of boundaries, before asking him to house sit while Robby is on sabbatical. Robby unsettles Whitaker with an offhand quip suggesting he may not come back from his trip.

While escorting Iris through triage, Donnie sees a news report about a slide collapsing at a nearby water park, and realizes the injured will be sent to the already-overwhelmed Pitt.

== Production ==
=== Development ===
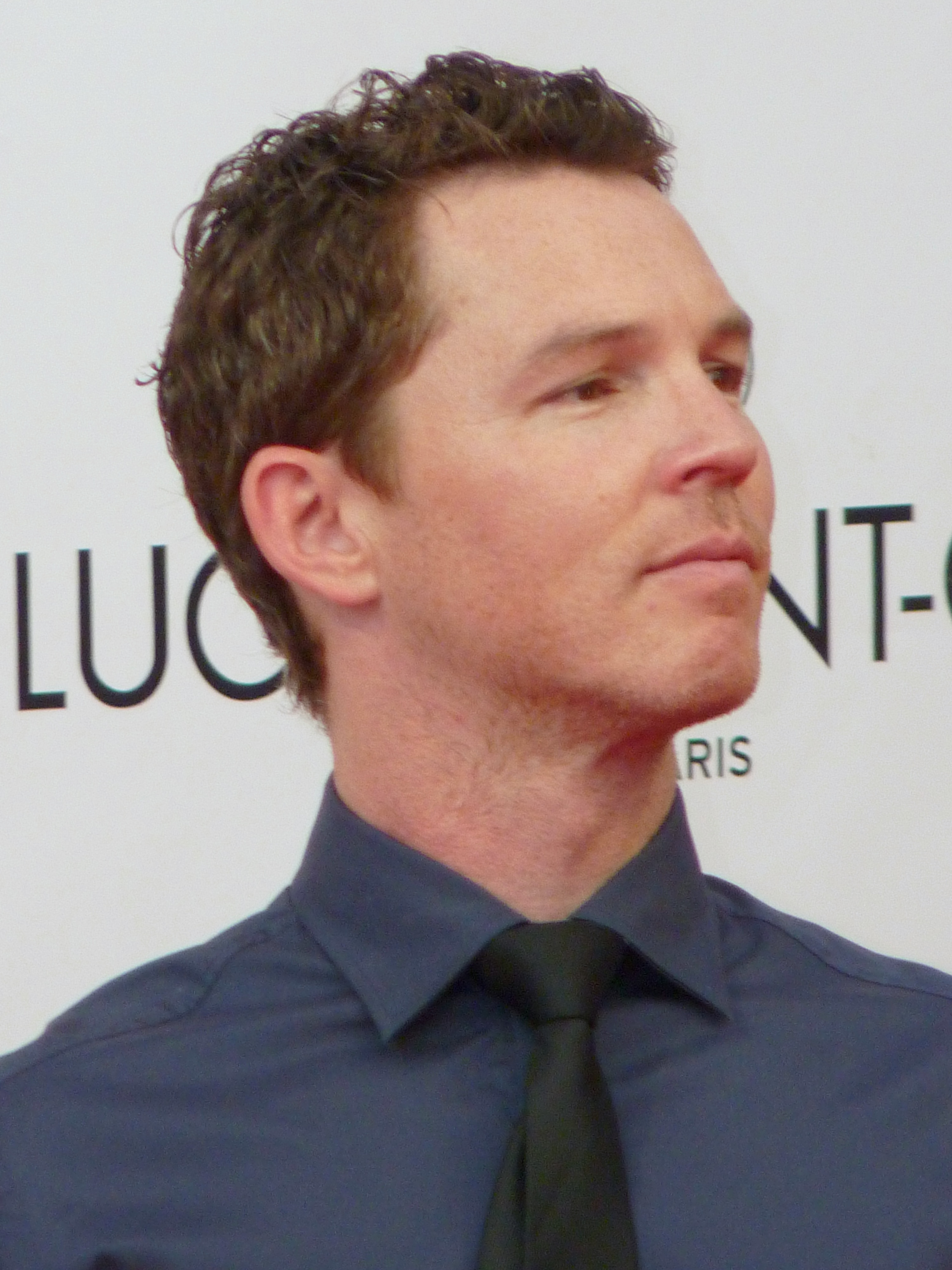
Shawn Hatosy, who plays Dr. Jack Abbot, made his television direction debut for the episode.

The episode was written by supervising producer Cynthia Adarkwa, and directed by Shawn Hatosy, who plays Dr. Jack Abbot. It marked Adarkwa's third writing credit, and Hatosy's first directing credit. Hatosy was confirmed to direct the episode in August 2025, commenting "I’m so excited to capture this show from the other side of the lens. The Pitt is an absolute dream for a director. I feel like a chef who gets to work in the best kitchen, with all the best ingredients – incredible writing, great actors, such strong characters with very distinct points of view; all in an immersive, adrenaline-pumped, beautifully choreographed world."

Hatosy, who previously directed episodes of John Wells' earlier productions Animal Kingdom and Rescue: HI-Surf, said that despite his past directorial experience, working on The Pitt required "[taking] that and throw[ing] it out the door." To prepare for the episode, Hatosy was given the scripts to the prior episodes to understand the continuity and also watched rough cuts of the episodes. As he was already part of the series, Hatosy had intuition on how to handle the episode's blocking and choreography.

=== Writing ===
Gerran Howell explained Whitaker's reactions to Robby offering him to take care of his apartment, saying "I remember being so surprised at how brusque and kind of frenetic it was. In the line readings, we played it like a real peace offering. But then when we got to it, it had a very strange tone to it. It was so quick and confusing and surprising, and we ran with it."

Hatosy also said that the scene would help the audience see "cracks" in Robby, "It's the first time he reveals that he might not be coming back, and it's almost, I don't want to say unhinged, but his energy is a little off there. It's the beginning of what we're going to see unfold as we get to the end of Season 2." Showrunner R. Scott Gemmill added, "I think there's a part of Robby that has a contingency plan that he might not come back. So when he says that, it may be a cry for help on a certain level, or it may be his own way of confronting it himself by using someone else to bounce it off. But I think it's a legitimate concern. And I think Robby knows that himself. I think he's struggling."

Regarding Javadi's storyline, Shabana Azeez said, "I think this season, Javadi is quite alone in the things that happen. Then also, the pain in this particular context, and we say it in the show all the time, but the emergency department is like a team sport, and this particular situation, where it's like, “Well, the nurse didn't write the name down. I didn't clock that, but we all fuck up, and that's why this happened.” It's not all her fault, but it's also not not her fault. You're meant to just be on top of everybody, helping everybody out all the time, and so it's so lonely."

== Critical reception ==
"3:00 P.M." received highly positive reviews from critics. Jesse Schedeen of IGN gave the episode a "great" 8 out of 10 rating and wrote in his verdict, "“3:00 PM” is another strong installment of The Pitt Season 2, albeit one that downplays the interpersonal drama among the doctors and nurses in favor of focusing on the medical cases flooding the ER. This episode is at its best exploring compelling developments like a tragically maimed firework victim and an overweight patient facing life-threatening surgery. It's slightly less effective when it comes to exploring Isa Briones' Dr. Santos' love life or struggling to flesh out Lucas Iverson's Ogilvie, but those are mostly minor concerns relative to everything Episode 9 does right."

Caroline Siede of The A.V. Club gave the episode a "B+" grade and wrote, "in a lot of ways, “3:00 P.M.” makes the case that The Pitt doesn't need some big dramatic mass-casualty event to give the season stakes. The most dramatic moments of this hour come when one of Javadi's patients simply slips through the cracks of the hospital's pseudo-analog setup and the doctors have to jump into crisis mode to save her — turning a simple surgical solution into a far more complicated one. That's why I'm not exactly sure how to react to the cliff-hanger reveal that a deadly waterslide collapse at a nearby waterpark is sending a new round of airlifted patients to PTMC."

Maggie Fremont of Vulture gave the episode a 4 star rating out of 5 and wrote, "I've repeatedly praised Javadi for her leveling up this season, in both skills and general confidence! Then this week, in hour nine, she goes and she blows it. Big time. I think I jinxed her and, well, that's on me. My bad, Dr. J! Javadi's steep fall in this episode is, however, a good reminder that she is still a med student, and on top of that, she's working a shift that is not only inordinately stressful but also confusing as hell."

Johnny Loftus of Decider wrote, "The sails, masts, and rigging quickly assembled to steady The Pitt's listing, under-threat-of-cyberattack ship are functioning. Haphazardly." Adam Patla of Telltale TV gave the episode a 4.8 star rating out of 5 and wrote, "Overall, “3:00 PM” is another needed moment to check in with characters emotionally before descending further into chaos. It also feels like a needed shifting point for some characters that weren't as prominent in the first half of the season to come into focus."

Sean T. Collins of The New York Times wrote, "We’ve already seen what a mass casualty event does to the Pitt, and that was when their computers were up and running. When Dana said, “This [expletive] day,” she apparently didn't know the half of it." Jasmine Blu of TV Fanatic gave the episode a 4.5 star rating out of 5 and wrote, "The Pitt Season 2 Episode 9 finally delivers something I’ve been expecting during an Independence Day shift at the ER, a firework mishap."

=== Accolades ===
Award	Category	Nominee	Result	Ref.
Black Reel TV Awards	Outstanding Writing in a Drama Series	Cynthia Adarkwa	Nominated	
Primetime Creative Arts Emmy Awards	Outstanding Guest Actress in a Drama Series	Brittany Allen	Nominated	
