= 78th Primetime Emmy Awards =

2026 American television awards

- Promotional poster
- Date: September 14, 2026 (Ceremony); September 5–6, 2026 (Creative Arts Awards)
- Location: Peacock Theater; Los Angeles, California
- Presented by: Academy of Television Arts & Sciences
- Hosted by: Mariska Hargitay

Highlights
- Most awards: Major: Widow's Bay (6); Total: Widow's Bay (14)
- Most nominations: Major: The Pitt (12); Total: The Pitt (25)
- Comedy Series: Widow's Bay
- Drama Series: The Pitt
- Limited or Anthology Series: DTF St. Louis

Television/radio coverage
- Network: NBC; Peacock
- Runtime: 3 hours
- Viewership: 6.8 million
- Produced by: Jesse Collins Entertainment

The 78th Primetime Emmy Awards honored the best in American prime time television programming from June 1, 2025, until May 31, 2026, as chosen by the Academy of Television Arts & Sciences. The awards ceremony was held live on September 14, 2026, at the Peacock Theater in Downtown Los Angeles, California, and was preceded by the 78th Primetime Creative Arts Emmy Awards on September 5 and 6. The ceremony was produced by Jesse Collins Entertainment, directed by Alex Rudzinski, and broadcast in the United States by NBC and Peacock. Mariska Hargitay hosted the event.

At the main ceremony, Widow's Bay led all programs with six awards including Outstanding Comedy Series, and The Pitt won two awards including Outstanding Drama Series. Other winning programs included Pluribus with two awards, and The Beast in Me, DTF St. Louis, Hacks, The Late Show with Stephen Colbert, Remarkably Bright Creatures, Slow Horses, and The Traitors with one each. Including Creative Arts Emmys, Widow's Bay led all shows with 14 wins, while Apple TV led all networks with 28 wins.

== Winners and nominees ==
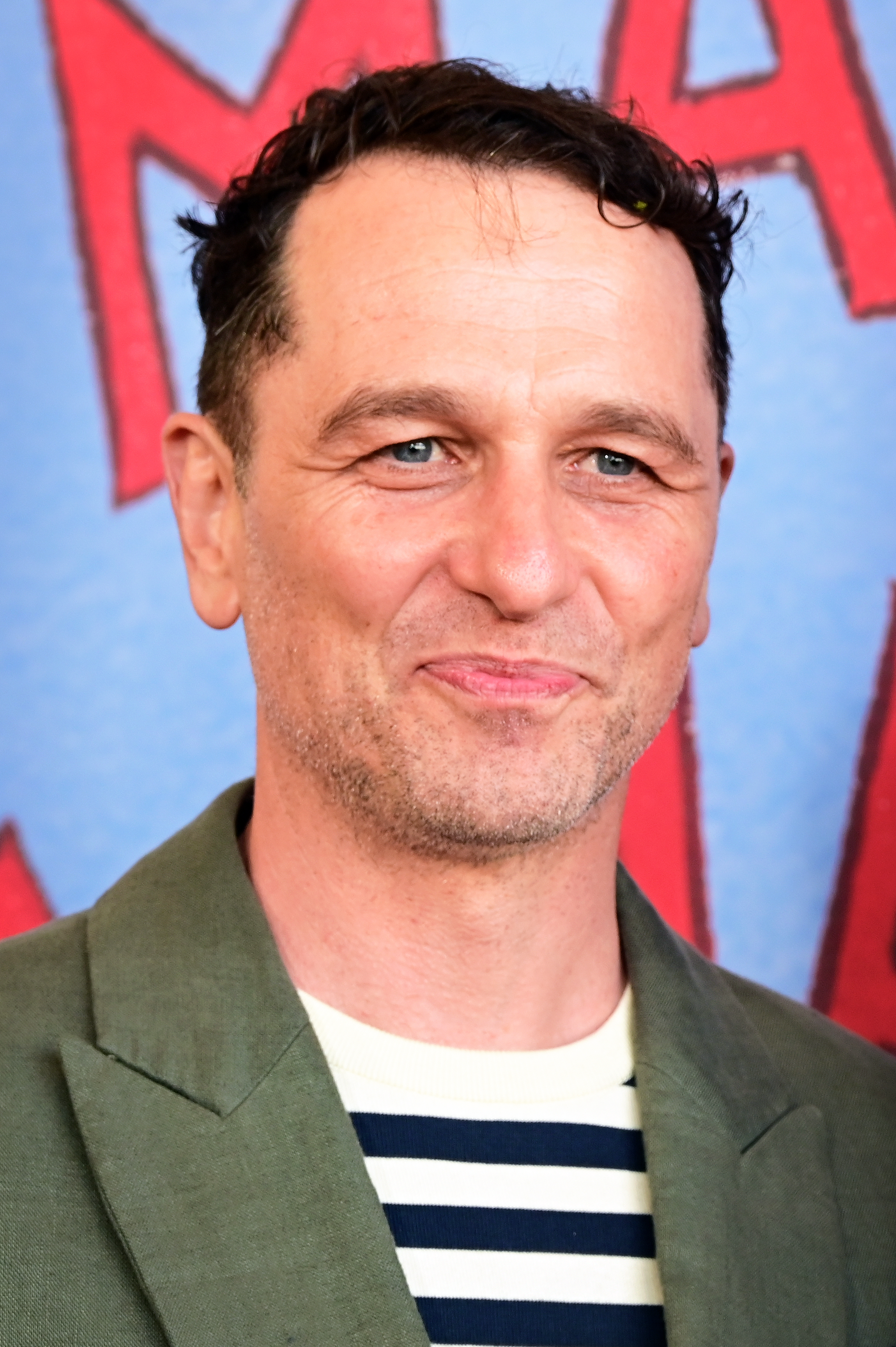
Matthew Rhys, winner for Outstanding Lead Actor in a Comedy Series and Outstanding Lead Actor in a Limited or Anthology Series or Movie

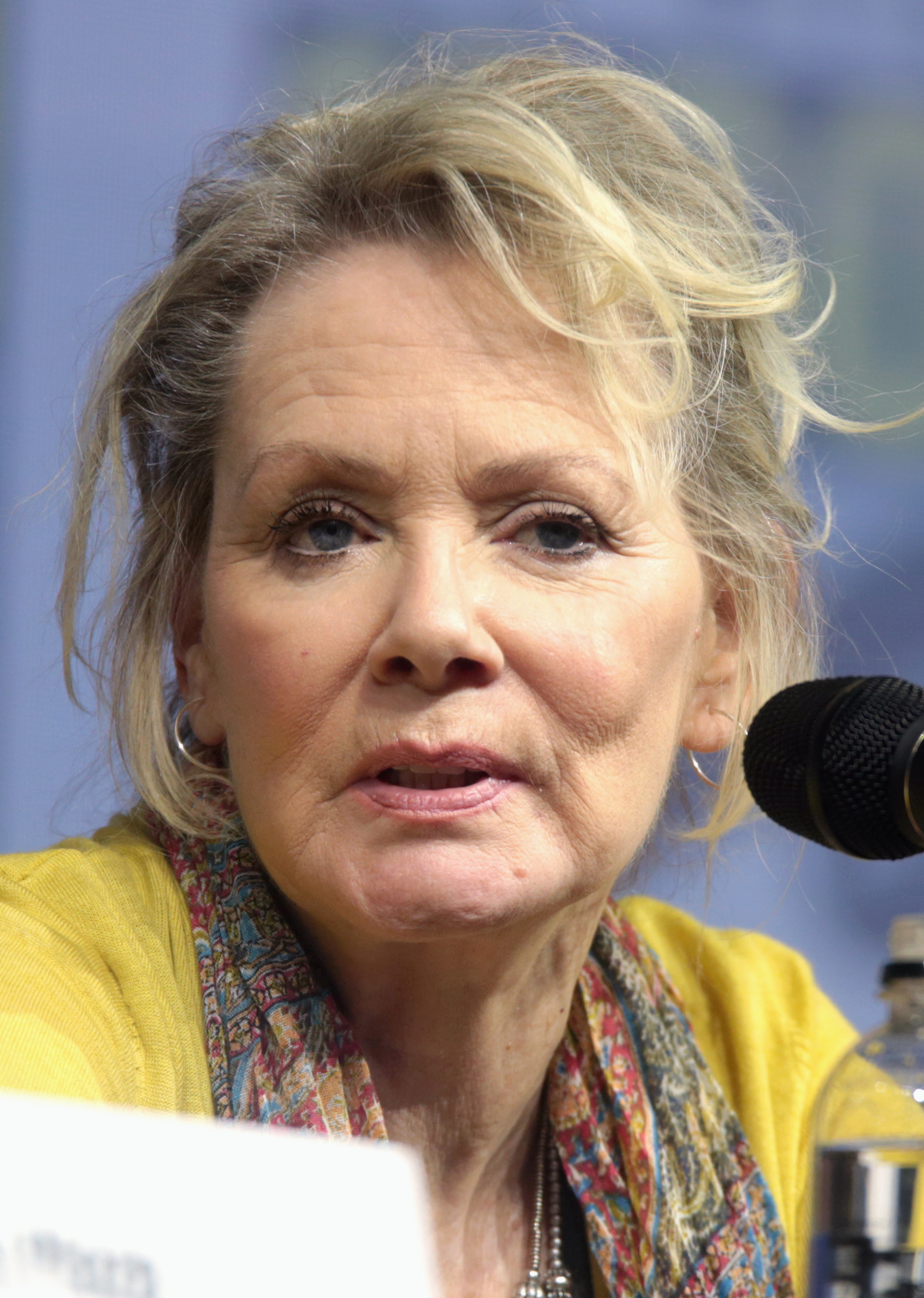
Jean Smart, Outstanding Lead Actress in a Comedy Series winner

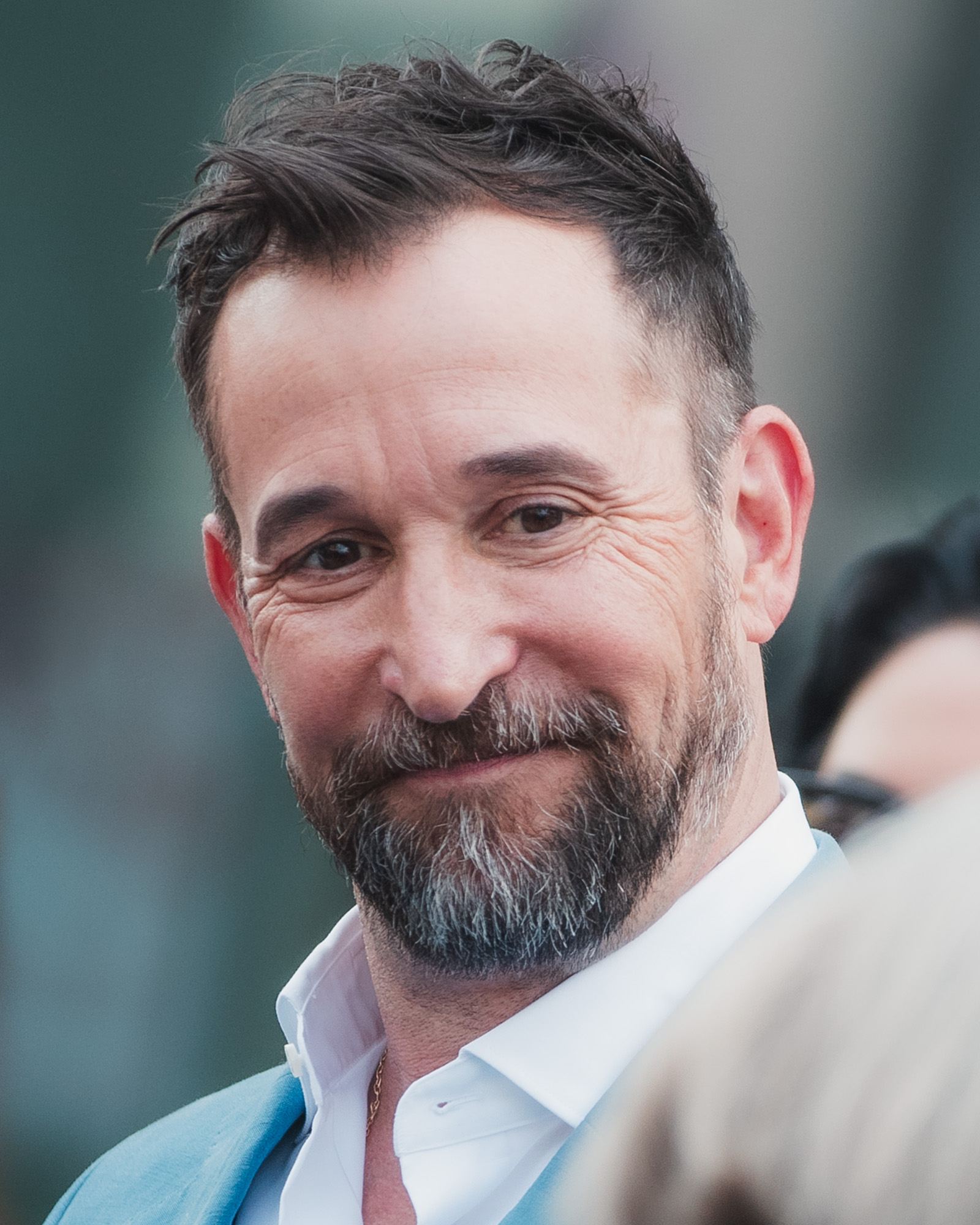
Noah Wyle, Outstanding Lead Actor in a Drama Series winner

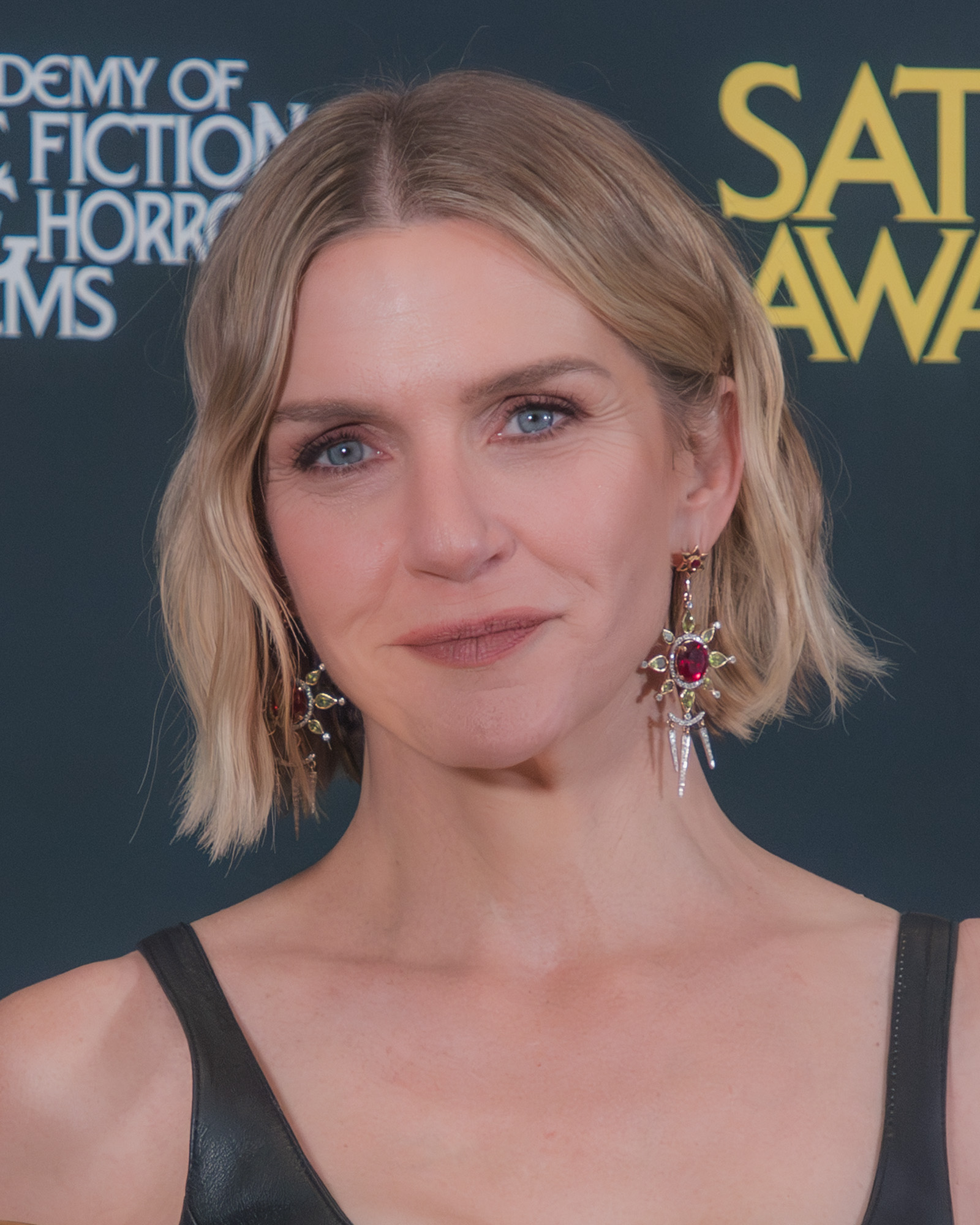
Rhea Seehorn, Outstanding Lead Actress in a Drama Series winner

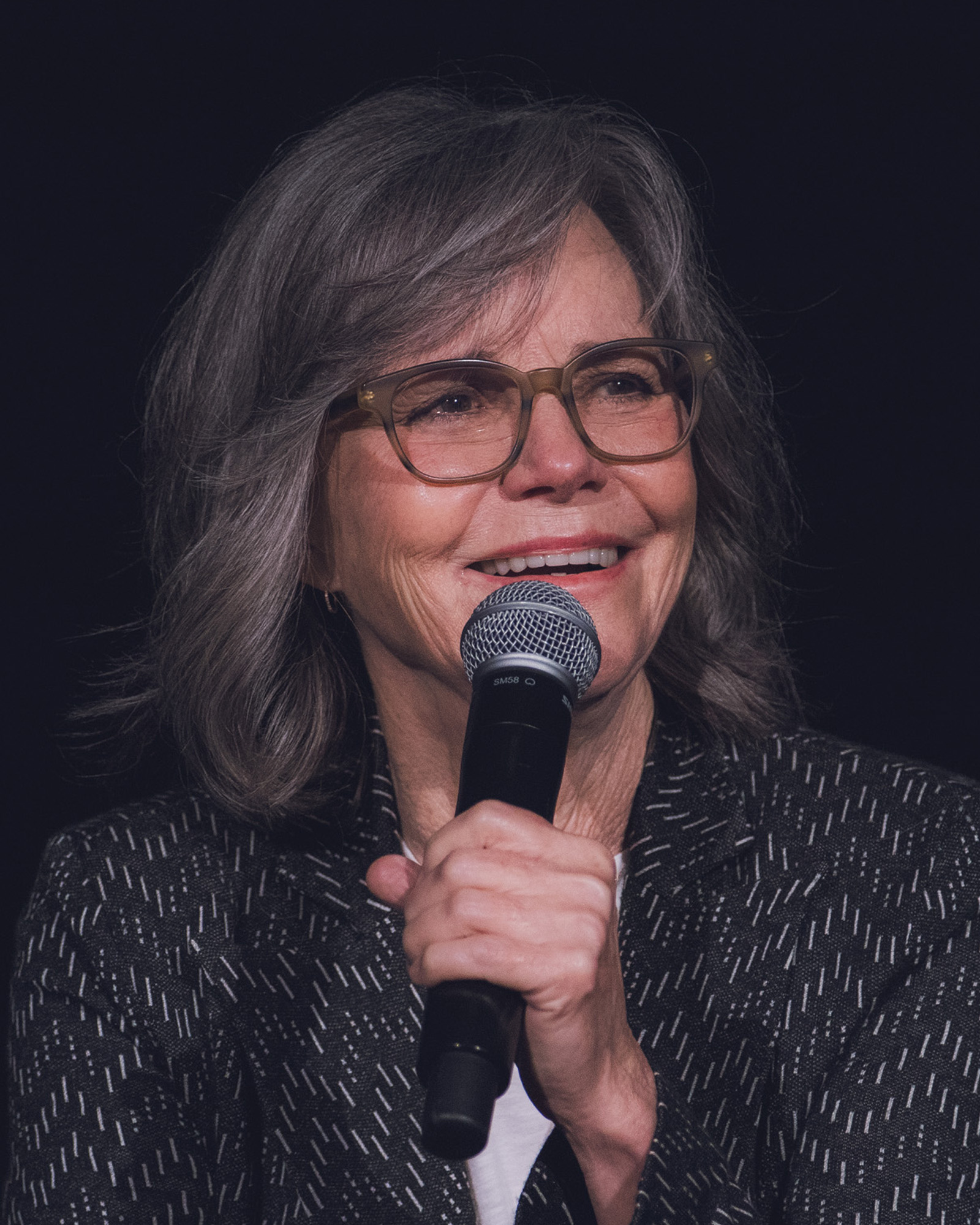
Sally Field, Outstanding Lead Actress in a Limited or Anthology Series or Movie winner

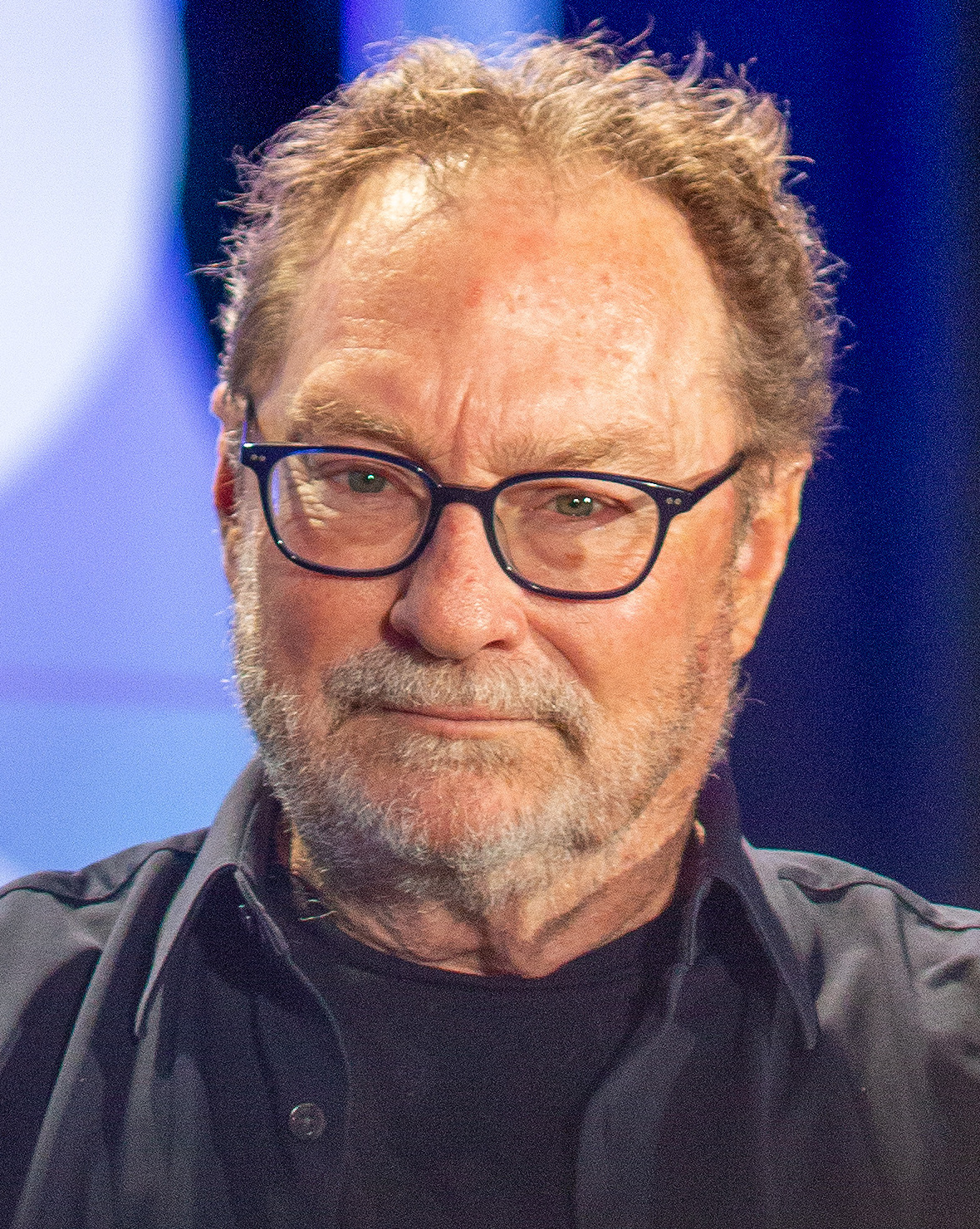
Stephen Root, Outstanding Supporting Actor in a Comedy Series winner

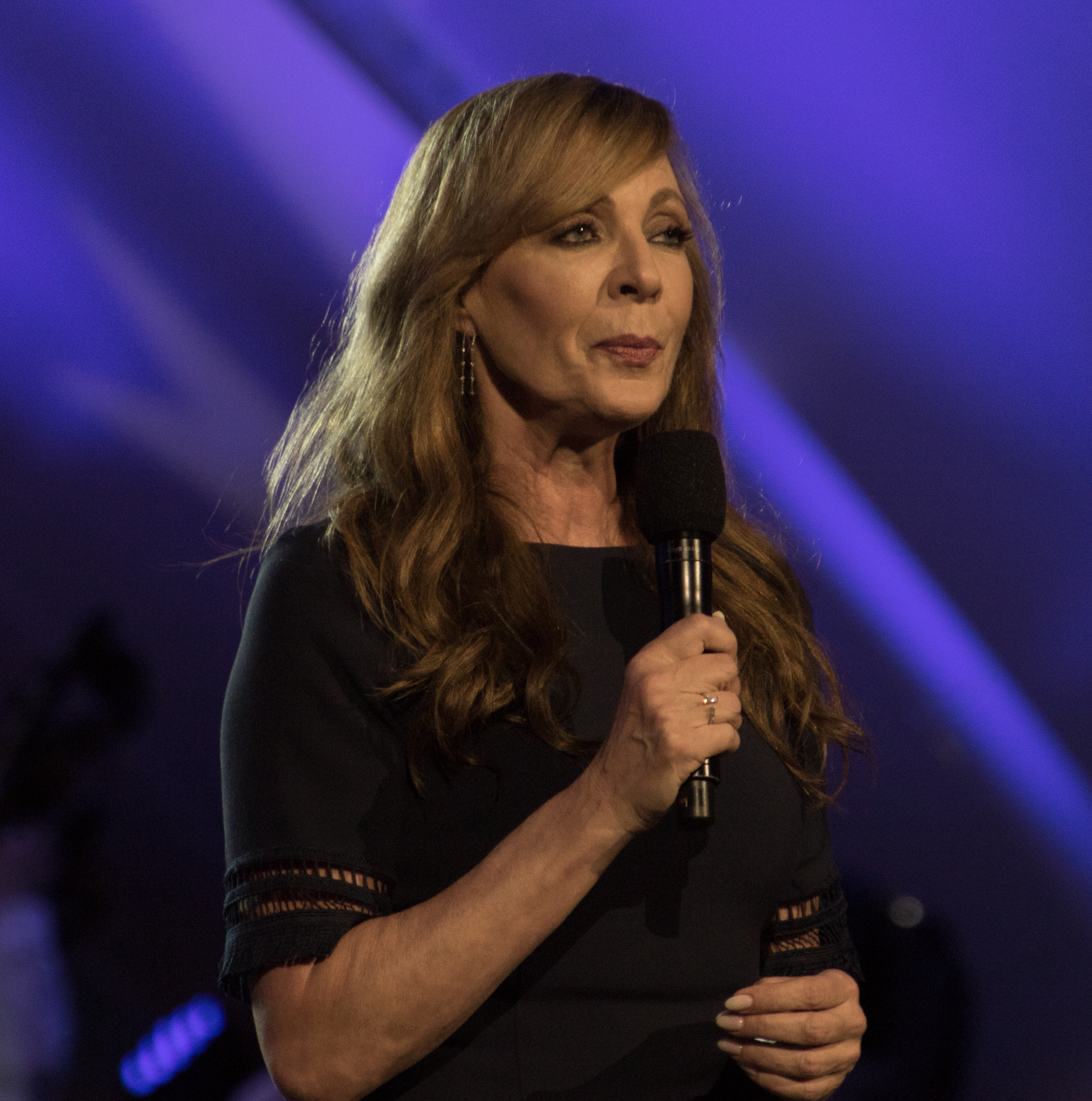
Allison Janney, Outstanding Supporting Actress in a Drama Series winner

The nominations for the 78th Primetime Emmy Awards were announced on July 8, 2026, at the Television Academy's Wolf Theatre in North Hollywood, Los Angeles, hosted by actor Jeff Hiller and actress Liza Colón-Zayas, along with Television Academy chair Cris Abrego. Including nominations at the 78th Primetime Creative Arts Emmy Awards, The Pitt led all programs with 25 nominations, followed by Hacks with 24 nominations. Hacks became the most-nominated comedy series for a single season in the awards' history with 24 nominations; the program surpassed the record jointly held by the FX comedy-drama series The Bear and the Apple TV comedy series The Studio which earned 23 nominations in 2024 and 2025, respectively. HBO and its streaming service HBO Max led all networks and platforms with 123 nominations; Netflix came in second place with 109 nominations.

Winners are listed first, highlighted in boldface, and indicated with a double dagger (‡). (Note: The outlets listed for each program are the U.S. broadcasters or streaming services identified in the nominations, which for some international productions are different than the broadcaster(s) that originally commissioned the program. Programs broadcast by HBO or HBO Max were listed under both services in the nominations list; only the original broadcaster is listed below.) For simplicity, producers who received nominations for program awards have been omitted.

=== Programs ===
| **Outstanding Comedy Series**: **Widow's Bay (Apple TV)**‡; Abbott Elementary (ABC); The Bear (FX); Hacks (HBO Max); Margo's Got Money Troubles (Apple TV); Nobody Wants This (Netflix); Only Murders in the Building (Hulu); Shrinking (Apple TV) | **Outstanding Drama Series**: **The Pitt (HBO Max)**‡; The Diplomat (Netflix); The Gilded Age (HBO); A Knight of the Seven Kingdoms (HBO); Paradise (Hulu); Pluribus (Apple TV); Slow Horses (Apple TV); Your Friends & Neighbors (Apple TV) |
| **Outstanding Limited or Anthology Series**: **DTF St. Louis (HBO)**‡; All Her Fault (Peacock); The Beast in Me (Netflix); Beef (Netflix); Love Story: John F. Kennedy Jr. & Carolyn Bessette (FX) | **Outstanding Reality Competition Program**: **The Traitors (Peacock)**‡; Dancing with the Stars (ABC); RuPaul's Drag Race (MTV); Survivor (CBS); Top Chef (Bravo) |
**Outstanding Variety Series**: **The Late Show with Stephen Colbert (CBS)**‡; The Daily Show (Comedy Central); Jimmy Kimmel Live! (ABC); Last Week Tonight with John Oliver (HBO); Saturday Night Live (NBC)

=== Acting ===
==== Lead ====
| **Outstanding Lead Actor in a Comedy Series**: **Matthew Rhys – Widow's Bay as Tom Loftis (Apple TV)**‡; Yahya Abdul-Mateen II – Wonder Man as Simon Williams / Wonder Man (Disney+); Steve Carell – Rooster as Greg Russo (HBO); Jason Segel – Shrinking as Jimmy Laird (Apple TV); Martin Short – Only Murders in the Building as Oliver Putnam (Hulu) | **Outstanding Lead Actress in a Comedy Series**: **Jean Smart – Hacks as Deborah Vance (HBO Max)**‡; Quinta Brunson – Abbott Elementary as Janine Teagues (ABC); Ayo Edebiri – The Bear as Sydney Adamu (FX); Elle Fanning – Margo's Got Money Troubles as Margo Millet (Apple TV); Lisa Kudrow – The Comeback as Valerie Cherish (HBO) |
| **Outstanding Lead Actor in a Drama Series**: **Noah Wyle – The Pitt as Dr. Michael "Robby" Robinavitch (HBO Max)**‡; Sterling K. Brown – Paradise as Xavier Collins (Hulu); Gary Oldman – Slow Horses as Jackson Lamb (Apple TV); Mark Ruffalo – Task as Tom Brandis (HBO); Rufus Sewell – The Diplomat as Hal Wyler (Netflix) | **Outstanding Lead Actress in a Drama Series**: **Rhea Seehorn – Pluribus as Carol Sturka (Apple TV)**‡; Carrie Coon – The Gilded Age as Bertha Russell (HBO); Chase Infiniti – The Testaments as Agnes MacKenzie (Hulu); Keri Russell – The Diplomat as Katherine "Kate" Wyler (Netflix); Zendaya – Euphoria as Rue Bennett (HBO) |
| **Outstanding Lead Actor in a Limited or Anthology Series or Movie**: **Matthew Rhys – The Beast in Me as Nile Jarvis (Netflix)**‡; Riz Ahmed – Bait as Shah Latif (Prime Video); Jason Bateman – Black Rabbit as Vince Friedken (Netflix); Charlie Hunnam – Monster: The Ed Gein Story as Ed Gein (Netflix); Oscar Isaac – Beef as Joshua Martín (Netflix) | **Outstanding Lead Actress in a Limited or Anthology Series or Movie**: **Sally Field – Remarkably Bright Creatures as Tova Sullivan (Netflix)**‡; Claire Danes – The Beast in Me as Aggie Wiggs (Netflix); Carey Mulligan – Beef as Lindsay Crane-Martín (Netflix); Sarah Pidgeon – Love Story: John F. Kennedy Jr. & Carolyn Bessette as Carolyn Bessette (FX); Sarah Snook – All Her Fault as Marissa Irvine (Peacock) |

==== Supporting ====
| **Outstanding Supporting Actor in a Comedy Series**: **Stephen Root – Widow's Bay as Wyck Crawford (Apple TV)**‡; Colman Domingo – The Four Seasons as Danny (Netflix); Paul W. Downs – Hacks as Jimmy LuSaque Jr. (HBO Max); Harrison Ford – Shrinking as Dr. Paul Rhoades (Apple TV); Nick Offerman – Margo's Got Money Troubles as James "Jinx" Millet (Apple TV); Michael Urie – Shrinking as Brian (Apple TV); Tyler James Williams – Abbott Elementary as Gregory Eddie (ABC) | **Outstanding Supporting Actress in a Comedy Series**: **Kate O'Flynn – Widow's Bay as Patricia Moyer (Apple TV)**‡; Dale Dickey – Widow's Bay as Rosemary (Apple TV); Hannah Einbinder – Hacks as Ava Daniels (HBO Max); Janelle James – Abbott Elementary as Ava Coleman (ABC); Michelle Pfeiffer – Margo's Got Money Troubles as Shyanne (Apple TV); Megan Stalter – Hacks as Kayla Schaefer (HBO Max); Jessica Williams – Shrinking as Gaby Evans (Apple TV) |
| **Outstanding Supporting Actor in a Drama Series**: **Tom Pelphrey – Task as Robbie Prendergrast (HBO)**‡; Patrick Ball – The Pitt as Dr. Frank Langdon (HBO Max); Billy Crudup – The Morning Show as Cory Ellison (Apple TV); Shawn Hatosy – The Pitt as Dr. Jack Abbot (HBO Max); Gerran Howell – The Pitt as Dr. Dennis Whitaker (HBO Max); Jack Lowden – Slow Horses as River Cartwright (Apple TV); Carlos Manuel Vesga – Pluribus as Manousos Oviedo (Apple TV) | **Outstanding Supporting Actress in a Drama Series**: **Allison Janney – The Diplomat as President Grace Penn (Netflix)**‡; Taylor Dearden – The Pitt as Dr. Mel King (HBO Max); Fiona Dourif – The Pitt as Dr. Cassie McKay (HBO Max); Katherine LaNasa – The Pitt as Dana Evans (HBO Max); Sepideh Moafi – The Pitt as Dr. Baran Al-Hashimi (HBO Max); Julianne Nicholson – Paradise as Samantha "Sinatra" Redmond (Hulu); Karolina Wydra – Pluribus as Zosia (Apple TV) |

=== Directing ===
| **Outstanding Directing for a Comedy Series**: **Widow's Bay: "Welcome to Widow's Bay!" – Hiro Murai (Apple TV)**‡; Abbott Elementary: "Ballgame" – Randall Einhorn (ABC); The Bear: "Bears" – Christopher Storer (FX); The Chair Company: "Life goes by too f**king fast, it really does." – Andrew DeYoung (HBO); Hacks: "Hacks" – Lucia Aniello (HBO Max); The Ms. Pat Show: "Give It Arrest" – Mary Lou Belli (BET+) | **Outstanding Directing for a Drama Series**: **Slow Horses: "Scars" – Saul Metzstein (Apple TV)**‡; The Gilded Age: "My Mind Is Made Up" – Salli Richardson-Whitfield (HBO); Paradise: "Exodus" – Hanelle Culpepper (Hulu); The Pitt: "12:00 P.M." – Noah Wyle (HBO Max); Pluribus: "We Is Us" – Vince Gilligan (Apple TV); Task: "Out beyond ideas of wrongdoing and rightdoing, there is a river." – Salli Richardson-Whitfield (HBO) |

=== Writing ===
| **Outstanding Writing for a Comedy Series**: **Widow's Bay: "Welcome to Widow's Bay!" – Katie Dippold (Apple TV)**‡; Abbott Elementary: "Team Building" – Quinta Brunson (ABC); The Chair Company: "Life goes by too f**king fast, it really does." – Tim Robinson and Zach Kanin (HBO); The Comeback: "Valerie Does It All" – Michael Patrick King and Lisa Kudrow (HBO); Hacks: "Hacks" – Lucia Aniello, Paul W. Downs, and Jen Statsky (HBO Max); Jury Duty Presents: Company Retreat: "Mergers and Acquisitions" – Anthony King (Prime Video) | **Outstanding Writing for a Drama Series**: **Pluribus: "We Is Us" – Vince Gilligan (Apple TV)**‡; The Diplomat: "Amagansett" – Peter Akerman and Debora Cahn (Netflix); The Pitt: "1:00 P.M." – Kirsten Pierre-Geyfman and R. Scott Gemmill (HBO); The Pitt: "12:00 P.M." – Valerie Chu (HBO); Slow Horses: "Scars" – Will Smith (Apple TV); Task: "A Still Small Voice" – Brad Ingelsby (HBO) |

=== Bob Hope Humanitarian Award ===
The Bob Hope Humanitarian Award was presented to actor and activist Michael J. Fox, in recognition of "his transformative contributions to Parkinson's disease research and advocacy".

=== Multiple nominations and wins ===
For the purposes of the lists below, "major" constitutes the categories listed above (program, acting, directing, and writing), while "total" includes the categories presented at the Creative Arts Emmy Awards ceremony. Programs and networks must have multiple wins or major nominations or at least five total nominations to be included.

==== By program ====
Programs with multiple nominations
| Nominations | | Program | Network |
| Total | Major | Program | Network |
|---|---|---|---|
| 25 | 12 | The Pitt | HBO Max |
| 24 | 7 | Hacks | HBO Max |
| 19 | 7 | Widow's Bay | Apple TV |
| 18 | 6 | Pluribus | Apple TV |
| 16 | 3 | Beef | Netflix |
| 13 | 1 | DTF St. Louis | HBO |
| 11 | 1 | Saturday Night Live | NBC |
| 11 | 0 | Spider-Noir | MGM+ / Prime Video |
| 9 | 0 | The Apple Music Super Bowl LX Halftime Show Starring Bad Bunny | NBC |
| 9 | 3 | The Beast in Me | Netflix |
| 9 | 0 | Fallout | Prime Video |
| 9 | 1 | A Knight of the Seven Kingdoms | HBO |
| 9 | 1 | The Late Show with Stephen Colbert | CBS |
| 9 | 0 | The Oscars | ABC |
| 9 | 1 | RuPaul's Drag Race | MTV |
| 9 | 5 | Shrinking | Apple TV |
| 9 | 5 | Slow Horses | Apple TV |
| 8 | 3 | The Bear | FX |
| 8 | 3 | The Gilded Age | HBO |
| 8 | 4 | Margo's Got Money Troubles | Apple TV |
| 8 | 0 | Palm Royale | Apple TV |
| 7 | 6 | Abbott Elementary | ABC |
| 7 | 2 | All Her Fault | Peacock |
| 7 | 1 | Black Rabbit | Netflix |
| 7 | 5 | The Diplomat | Netflix |
| 7 | 1 | Euphoria | HBO |
| 7 | 1 | Monster: The Ed Gein Story | Netflix |
| 7 | 4 | Paradise | Hulu |
| 7 | 0 | Stranger Things | Netflix |
| 6 | 1 | Jimmy Kimmel Live! | ABC |
| 6 | 2 | Love Story: John F. Kennedy Jr. & Carolyn Bessette | FX |
| 6 | 0 | Mel Brooks: The 99 Year Old Man! | HBO |
| 6 | 0 | The Muppet Show | Disney+ |
| 6 | 0 | Ocean with David Attenborough | National Geographic |
| 6 | 4 | Task | HBO |
| 6 | 1 | The Traitors | Peacock |
| 6 | 0 | Wednesday | Netflix |
| 6 | 0 | Wicked: One Wonderful Night | NBC |
| 5 | 0 | The Amazing Race | CBS |
| 5 | 0 | The Boys | Prime Video |
| 5 | 1 | Dancing with the Stars | ABC |
| 5 | 0 | John Candy: I Like Me | Prime Video |
| 5 | 0 | Love on the Spectrum | Netflix |
| 5 | 2 | Only Murders in the Building | Hulu |
| 5 | 1 | Survivor | CBS |
| 5 | 0 | Taylor Swift: The Eras Tour: The Final Show | Disney+ |
| <5 | 2 | The Chair Company | HBO |
| <5 | 2 | The Comeback | HBO |

Programs with multiple wins
| Wins | | Program | Network |
| Total | Major | Program | Network |
|---|---|---|---|
| 14 | 6 | Widow's Bay | Apple TV |
| 7 | 0 | The Apple Music Super Bowl LX Halftime Show Starring Bad Bunny | NBC |
| 7 | 1 | DTF St. Louis | HBO |
| 7 | 1 | The Traitors | Peacock |
| 6 | 1 | The Late Show with Stephen Colbert | CBS |
| 6 | 2 | The Pitt | HBO Max |
| 6 | 2 | Pluribus | Apple TV |
| 5 | 0 | Spider-Noir | MGM+ |
| 4 | 0 | The Muppet Show | Disney+ |
| 3 | 0 | Beef | Netflix |
| 3 | 0 | Love on the Spectrum | Netflix |
| 3 | 0 | Margo's Got Money Troubles | Apple TV |
| 3 | 0 | Palm Royale | Apple TV |
| 2 | 1 | The Beast in Me | Netflix |
| 2 | 0 | Bridgerton | Netflix |
| 2 | 0 | Fallout | Amazon Prime Video |
| 2 | 1 | Hacks | HBO Max |
| 2 | 0 | My Mom Jayne | HBO |
| 2 | 0 | Ocean with David Attenborough | National Geographic |
| 2 | 0 | Primal | Adult Swim |
| 2 | 1 | Remarkably Bright Creatures | Netflix |

==== By network ====
Networks with multiple nominations
| Nominations | | Network |
| Total | Major | Network |
|---|---|---|
| 122 | 35 | HBO / HBO Max |
| 111 | 16 | Netflix |
| 87 | 29 | Apple TV |
| 40 | 8 | ABC |
| 32 | 2 | CBS |
| 28 | 2 | Prime Video |
| 30 | 1 | NBC |
| 23 | 5 | FX |
| 22 | 7 | Hulu |
| 18 | 3 | Peacock |
| 14 | 1 | Disney+ |
| 12 | 0 | National Geographic |
| 11 | 0 | MGM+ |
| 11 | 1 | MTV |
| 7 | 1 | Comedy Central |
| 6 | 0 | YouTube |
| 5 | 1 | Bravo |
| 5 | 0 | PBS |

Networks with multiple wins
| Wins | | Network |
| Total | Major | Network |
|---|---|---|
| 28 | 9 | Apple TV |
| 21 | 5 | HBO / HBO Max |
| 16 | 3 | Netflix |
| 8 | 0 | NBC |
| 7 | 1 | Peacock |
| 6 | 1 | CBS |
| 6 | 0 | Disney+ |
| 5 | 0 | Amazon Prime Video |
| 5 | 0 | MGM+ |
| 3 | 0 | FX |
| 3 | 0 | National Geographic |
| 2 | 0 | Adult Swim |
| 2 | 0 | Comedy Central |
| 2 | 0 | PBS |
| 2 | 0 | YouTube |

== Presenters ==
Presenters at the ceremony
| Name(s) | Role |
|---|---|
| Amy Poehler | Presented the Primetime Emmy Award for Outstanding Supporting Actress in a Comedy Series |
| Zendaya | Presented the Primetime Emmy Award for Outstanding Lead Actress in a Comedy Series |
| Sarah Michelle Gellar; David Boreanaz | Presented the Primetime Emmy Award for Outstanding Lead Actor in a Limited or Anthology Series or Movie |
| Alan Cumming | Presented the Primetime Emmy Award for Outstanding Supporting Actress in a Drama Series |
| Julia Garner; Florence Pugh | Presented the Primetime Emmy Award for Outstanding Lead Actress in a Drama Series |
| Sofía Vergara | Presented the Primetime Emmy Award for Outstanding Supporting Actor in a Comedy Series |
| The cast of the Baywatch reboot | Presented the Primetime Emmy Award for Outstanding Reality Competition Program |
| John Mulaney | Presented the Primetime Emmy Award for Outstanding Lead Actor in a Drama Series |
| Odessa A'zion; Rachel Sennott | Presented the Primetime Emmy Award for Outstanding Supporting Actor in a Drama Series |
| Emma D'Arcy; Emilia Clarke | Presented the Primetime Emmy Award for Outstanding Lead Actress in a Limited or Anthology Series or Movie |
| Amanda Peet; Jon Hamm | Presented the Primetime Emmy Award for Outstanding Lead Actor in a Comedy Series |
| LL Cool J Scott Caan | Presented the Primetime Emmy Award for Outstanding Writing for a Comedy Series |
| Shailene Woodley; Peter Krause | Presented the Primetime Emmy Award for Outstanding Directing for a Drama Series |
| Paul Anthony Kelly; Awkwafina | Presented the Primetime Emmy Award for Outstanding Variety Series |
| Marcello Hernández | Presented the Primetime Emmy Award for Outstanding Directing for a Comedy Series |
| Julianna Margulies | Presented the Bob Hope Humanitarian Award to Michael J. Fox |
| Linda Cardellini; David Harbour | Presented the Primetime Emmy Award for Outstanding Writing for a Drama Series |
| Niecy Nash-Betts | Presented the Primetime Emmy Award for Outstanding Limited or Anthology Series |
| The cast of Charlie's Angels | Presented the Primetime Emmy Award for Outstanding Drama Series |
| Woody Harrelson; Matthew McConaughey | Presented the Primetime Emmy Award for Outstanding Comedy Series |

== Ceremony information ==
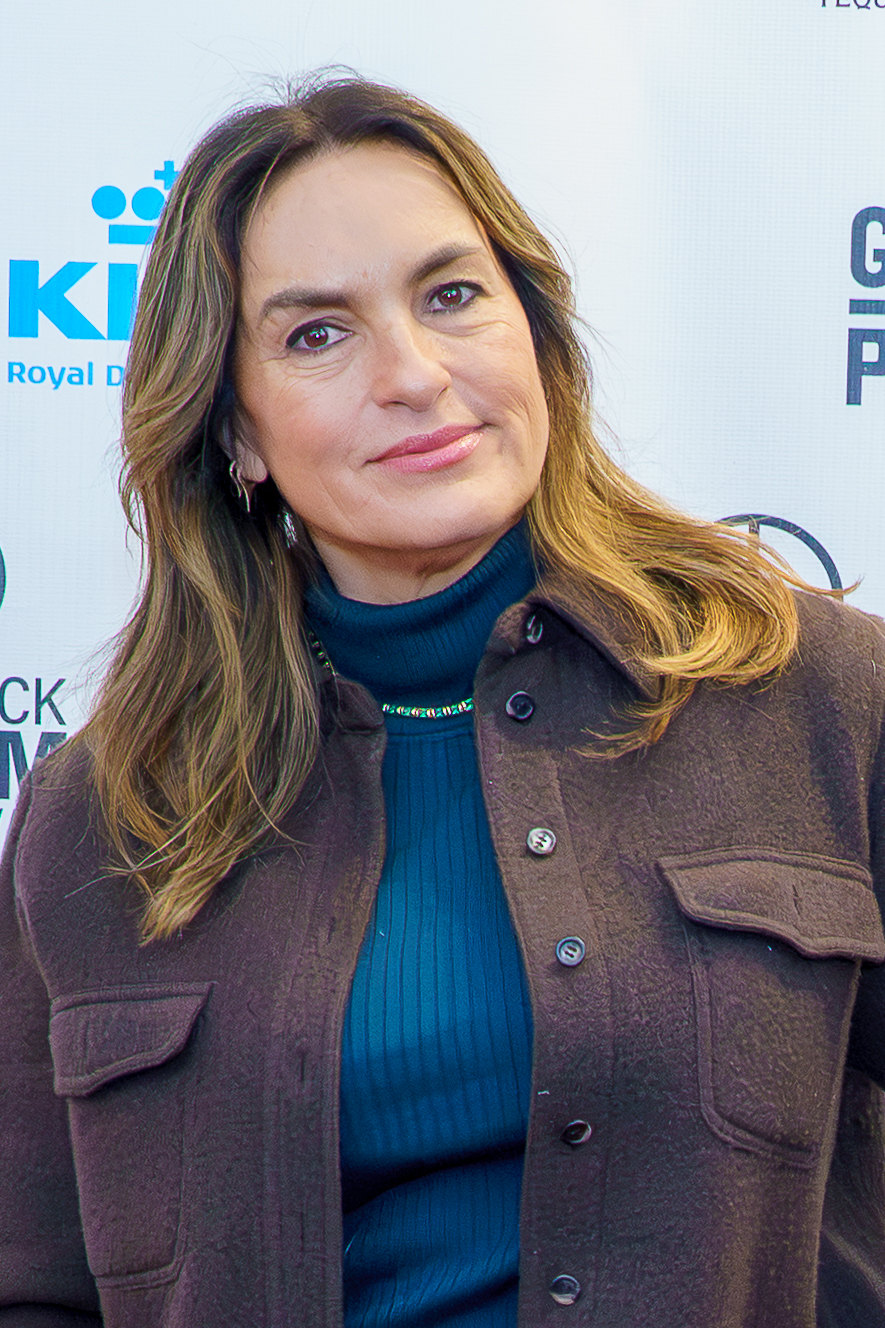
Mariska Hargitay hosted the ceremony.

The nominations for the 78th Primetime Emmy Awards were announced on July 8, 2026, at the Television Academy's Wolf Theatre in North Hollywood, Los Angeles, hosted by actor Jeff Hiller and actress Liza Colón-Zayas, along with Television Academy chair Cris Abrego. The nominations for Outstanding Variety Series and Outstanding Reality Competition Program were announced three hours before the rest of the categories. On July 7, actress Mariska Hargitay was announced as the ceremony's host. NBC and the Television Academy considered talent both within and outside of NBCUniversal for the role, but ultimately hired NBC's Law & Order: Special Victims Unit's lead actress in honor of the network's 100th anniversary. This was the first Primetime Emmys ceremony that the host is not a comedian, comedy performer, reality host or television personality since Angela Lansbury in 1993, and the first time that the event was hosted by a woman since Jane Lynch in 2011.

Jesse Collins, Dionne Harmon, and Jeannae Rouzan-Clay of Jesse Collins Entertainment served as executive producers of the telecast. To avoid conflicts with the network's broadcast of NBC Sunday Night Football, the event was scheduled on a Monday night, instead of a Sunday, which NBC had previously done when they aired the awards ceremony every four years since 2014.

=== Category and rule changes ===
In January 2026, the Television Academy announced plans to present its first new major award in nearly twenty years with the creation of the Legacy Award, which will be presented annually to television programs that have made a "profound and lasting impact" on audiences, and remain relevant to culture, society and the industry. Additionally, Outstanding Scripted Variety Series and Outstanding Talk Series were merged into Outstanding Variety Series. The new Variety Series category is tracked, meaning the number of nominees from each format is proportional to the number of submissions, and it became an area award where voters select any and all nominees they believe deserve an award, with the potential for multiple winners.

In July, the Television Academy voted to move five categories to the Creative Arts ceremonies on the preceding weekend: Outstanding Supporting Actor, Supporting Actress, Directing, and Writing for a Limited or Anthology Series or Movie and Writing for a Variety Series. Abrego justified the changes as a way to add other elements to the show such as musical performances or comedy segments, with the moves selected to "be as balanced and as equitable as possible". A joint statement from the Directors Guild of America, the Writers Guild of America, and SAG-AFTRA criticized the changes and commented, "The decision to eliminate these categories from the prime-time broadcast devalues the contributions of the talented people the Academy is meant to honor." "The move doesn't make much sense. All they've done is piss off a lot of the people and stars they are trying to court and attend their ceremony. I think this will blow up in their face", one outraged awards strategist told Variety. Additionally, Outstanding Variety Special (Live) was shifted back to the Creative Arts ceremonies, leaving 19 categories for the main ceremony (a decrease from last year's 26).

== In Memoriam ==
The In Memoriam segment was presented by Macaulay Culkin, Annie Murphy and Dan Levy, and featured Noah Kahan singing "Bridge Over Troubled Water".

- Catherine O'Hara – performer
- James Van Der Beek – performer
- Crawford "Mac" McGill – executive
- Dixon Q Dern – attorney
- Sarah Caplan – producer
- Kiki Shepard – host
- Anthony Geary – performer
- Isiah Whitlock Jr. – performer
- Gary Dontzig – producer, writer
- Demond Wilson – performer
- Gil Gerard – performer
- June Lockhart – performer
- Anthony Head – performer
- Diane Ladd – performer
- Sid Krofft – producer
- Ted Turner – executive
- Patricia Crowley – performer
- Bruce Bilson – director, Television Academy governor
- John Masius – writer
- Eric Dane – performer
- Bob Broder – agent, executive
- Eric Overmyer – producer, writer
- Hayden Panettiere – performer
- Tom Cherones – director
- Louise Lasser – performer
- T. K. Carter – performer
- Robert Duvall – performer
- Dolly Parton – performer
- Sandy Wernick – manager, producer
- Robert Carradine – performer
- Sylvia Gold – agent
- Scott Printz – producer
- Vincent Pastore – performer
- Kevin Arkadie – writer
- Maria Riva – performer
- Peter Lassally – producer
- Harris Katleman – executive
- Randolph Mantooth – performer
- Laura Adler – casting director
- Jon Cypher – performer
- Jay Daniel – producer
- Gene Shalit – journalist
- Cleto Escobedo III – musician
- Salli Newman – executive
- Sam Neill – performer
- Hal Williams – performer
- Tim Curry – performer
- Shelley Fabares – performer
- Bob Mackie – costume designer
- James Burrows – director
- Rob Reiner – performer, producer, writer

Earlier in the show, Parton was honored by Sally Field, with Reba McEntire performing Parton's song "Appalachian Memories". At the beginning of the tribute, O'Hara was eulogized by Culkin, Murphy, and Levy. To close the segment, Burrows and Reiner were honored by Jamie Lee Curtis.
