= Audio pornography =

Pornography which uses audio only

Audio pornography, also known as audio erotica, is a type of pornography that relies solely on sound without visual content. This form of erotica often features moaning, dirty talk, scripted narratives, ambient soundscapes, and other audio cues intended to sexually arouse the listener. Because it lacks visual stimulation, it engages the listener's imagination and can be experienced in a more intimate and personal way.

Audio pornography may include a range of styles, from highly produced, scripted scenes with voice actors and sound design, to amateur recordings and ASMR-inspired audio experiences. It can be consumed via streaming platforms, mobile apps, podcasts, or downloadable files.

== Popularity and demographics ==
The popularity of audio pornography has grown significantly since the late 2010s, particularly among female audiences and producers. Studies and industry trends have shown that women often prefer erotica that emphasizes storytelling and emotional connection over explicit visuals. As such, audio porn has found a niche among listeners seeking a more immersive or ethically conscious alternative to mainstream visual pornography.

Several platforms and companies—such as Dipsea, Quinn, and Ferly—have emerged, offering subscription-based access to curated erotic audio content. These platforms are often run or co-founded by women and focus on creating content that is inclusive, consensual, and aligned with feminist values.

== Cultural and technological context ==
Audio pornography exists at the intersection of erotica, technology, and changing cultural attitudes toward sexuality. The proliferation of smartphones, headphones, and audio-first platforms (like podcasts and streaming apps) has made erotic audio content more accessible than ever before. In a time when many people seek discreet, private, and on-demand sexual content, audio pornography offers a convenient and less stigmatized format.

Its rise is also tied to broader discussions about consent, representation, and ethical production in the adult industry. Audio pornography allows for a different kind of engagement—one that can prioritize listener comfort, imagination, and narrative depth.

== See also ==
- Erotica
- Pornography
- ASMR
- Feminist pornography
- Audio play
- Sensual massage
