= Quinn (app) =

Audio erotica app and website

- Founded: 2019; 7 years ago
- Key people: Caroline Spiegel (founder)
- Services: Audio erotica
- Website: tryquinn.com
- Registration: Required
- Current status: Online

Quinn is an audio erotica platform aimed at women.

== History ==
The Quinn website was launched in 2019, and it initially offered user-submitted audio-based and text-based erotica for free, with the option for users to tip creators. The company shifted its business model since then in several ways, including making Quinn a paid subscription service, removing written erotica to exclusively offer audio, and paying their higher-performing content creators upfront. The Quinn mobile app was released in 2021.

In 2024, the company began hiring celebrities as voice actors, including Andrew Scott, Chris Briney, and Jamie Campbell Bower among others. The company's founder stated that producing audio "works nicely when audiences are hungry for more content from a given rising star but they're gonna have to wait months for [...] whatever it is, right? [...] [W]e can fill that space for talent and feed their audiences with this smutty audiobook project". In late 2025, 80% of Quinn subscribers were in the 24-30 age range, 83% of subscribers were women, and the company's revenue doubled between February and October 2025.

On December 30, 2025, Quinn released the first two episodes of Ember and Ice, a gay romantasy series featuring Connor Storrie and Hudson Williams, the lead actors of the popular television series Heated Rivalry. In January 2026, Quinn was criticized for removing a mention of trans women from a video interview with Storrie and Williams. In response, the company released a statement and donated approximately $25,000 to Trans Lifeline.

== Quinn Originals ==
- The Inventor's Apprentice (Thomas Doherty)
- The Misty Door (Jesse Williams)
- Compromised (Victoria Pedretti)
- The Queen's Guard (Andrew Scott)
- Amplified (Kate Moennig)
- The Regent (Lucien Laviscount)
- The Trials (Jamie Campbell Bower)
- The Muse (Tom Blyth)
- Hidden Harbor (Chris Briney)
- Hyperdrive (Manny Jacinto)
- Ember & Ice (Hudson Williams & Connor Storrie)
- The Trials: Winter Solstice (Jamie Campbell Bower)
- Morally Gray (Costa D'Angelo)
- The Snake Handler (Rob Rausch)
- The Bodyguard (Tyriq Withers)
- Yes, Chef (Shawn Hatosy)
- Three Days in Galloway (Sam Heughan)
- Rent Free (Mika Abdalla & Stephen Kalyn)
- The Wolf (Matt Smith)
- The Honeymooners (Nick Robinson)
- Olympus U (Lili Reinhart & Tom Bateman)
- The Dead End Diner (Wilson Bethel)
- Felled (Alexander Skarsgård)
- The Haunting of Pendle Creek (Nina Dobrev & Paul Wesley)
