= Tal Anderson =

American actress and author

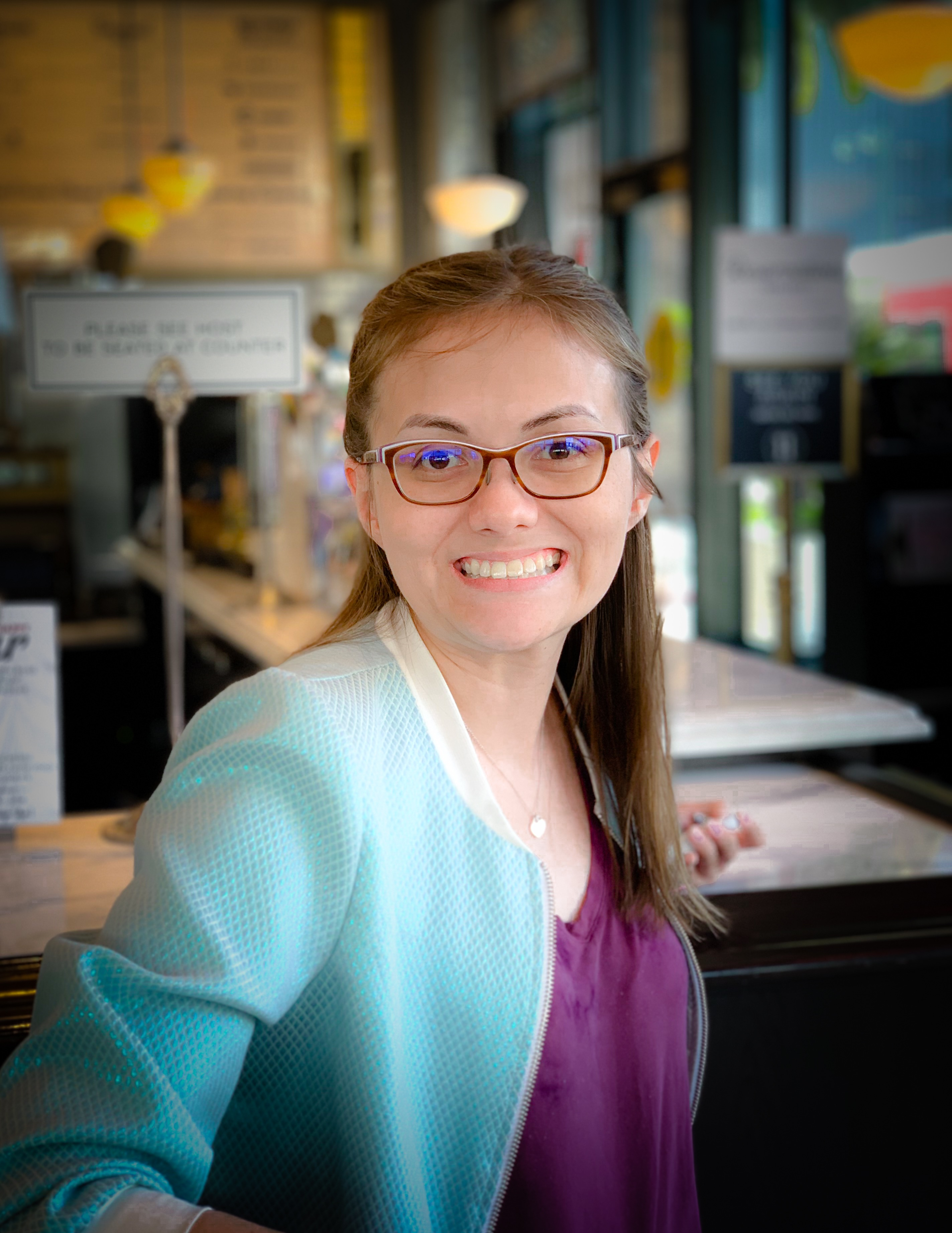
- Tal Anderson in 2019.
- Born: August 1, 1997 (age 29); New Orleans, Louisiana
- Occupations: actress, children's writer
- Known for: The Pitt, Atypical
- Notable work: Oh Tal! Not Today.
- Website: thetalanderson.com

Tal Anderson is an American actress and author. She is known for her role as Sid on the Netflix television series Atypical and more recently her role as Becca King in the HBO series The Pitt (2025–present), for which she was nominated for a 2026 Primetime Emmy Award for Outstanding Guest Actress in a Drama Series.

== Early life ==
Anderson was born in New Orleans, Louisiana and grew up in Cape Coral, Florida. Anderson is of Korean and Italian-American descent and has spoken about her multi-racial heritage and experience as an adoptee in interviews. Her mother is Vickie Anderson.

Anderson was diagnosed with a learning disorder at one year old and later with autism while she was in preschool; however, Anderson was not aware of her autism diagnosis until age 15. She describes having family support, support from teachers, and resources such as therapists growing up.

== Career ==
Anderson began acting as a child. Anderson graduated from Full Sail University and was named valedictorian of her graduating class. After graduating from college, Anderson moved to Los Angeles with her cat Winifred (Winnie for short). In Los Angeles she worked as a video editing apprentice for Good Citizen Media Group.

From 2019 to 2021, she appeared in the Netflix series Atypical, in which she portrayed the character Sid, an autistic teenager. She met autistic illustrator Michael Richey White through Atypical, and collaborated to create her first book, Oh, Tal! Not Today, which was published in October 2024 by Violet Sky Media. The second book in the series, Oh, Tal! Not Like That is scheduled to be released in April 2026.

Beginning in 2025, Anderson has also appeared in the award-winning HBO Max series The Pitt, in which she portrays the character Becca King, the sister of Dr. Melissa King portrayed by Taylor Dearden. The sisters have been lauded as realistic representation of autism.

== Writing and advocacy ==
Anderson is the author of children's books focused on autism and disability inclusion. She has discussed autism representation, neurodiversity, and employment opportunities for neurodivergent individuals in interviews and public appearances. For this role, she was nominated for a 2026 Primetime Emmy Award for Outstanding Guest Actress in a Drama Series.

== Awards and nominations ==
Year	Award	Category	Nominated work	Result	Ref.
2026	Astra TV Awards	Best Guest Actress in a Drama Series	The Pitt	Won	
2026	Primetime Emmy Awards	Outstanding Guest Actress in a Drama Series	The Pitt	Nominated	
