= 12:00 P.M. (The Pitt season 2) =

- The Pitt episode
- Episode no.: Season 2 Episode 6
- Directed by: Noah Wyle
- Written by: Valerie Chu
- Cinematography by: Johanna Coelho
- Editing by: Mark Strand
- Production code: T76.10206
- Original air date: February 12, 2026
- Running time: 49 minutes

Guest appearances
- Amielynn Abellera as Perlah Alawi; Brandon Mendez Homer as Donnie Donahue; Kristin Villanueva as Princess; Brittany Allen as Roxie Hamler; Lesley Boone as Lena Handzo; Irene Choi as Dr. Joy Kwon; Erin Croom as Jayda Davis; Jessica "Limer" Flores as Harlow Graham; Taylor Handley as Paul Hamler; Ernest Harden Jr. as Louie Cloverfield; Laëtitia Hollard as Emma Nolan; Lucas Iverson as James Ogilvie; Alexandra Metz as Dr. Yolanda Garcia; Zack Morris as Jackson Davis; Christopher Thornton as Dr. Caleb Jefferson; Ned Brower as Jesse Van Horn; Charles Baker as Troy Digby; John Lee Ames as Gus Varney; John Squires as Brandon Li; Ambar Martinez as Kim Tate

Episode chronology
← Previous "11:00 A.M."	Next → "1:00 P.M."

"12:00 P.M." is the sixth episode of the second season of the American medical drama television series The Pitt. It is the 21st overall episode of the series. It was written by Valerie Chu, and directed by Noah Wyle. It was released on HBO Max on February 12, 2026.

The series is set in Pittsburgh, following the staff of the Pittsburgh Trauma Medical Center ER (nicknamed "The Pitt") during a 15-hour emergency department shift. The series mainly follows Dr. Michael "Robby" Robinavitch, a senior attending still struggling to cope with the traumas of working through the COVID-19 pandemic, as well as the mass casualty event that took place ten months prior (during the first season). In this episode, the hospital experiences a tragedy, while Langdon tries to make amends with his fellow emergency department staff.

The episode received critical acclaim, with critics praising the resolution to Louie's story arc, the emotional tone, Wyle's directing, and the focus on the nurses.

== Plot ==
Robby and Langdon attempt to revive Louie after he suffers a pulmonary hemorrhage caused by liver failure, but he dies despite resuscitation efforts. While going through his belongings, Langdon finds a photograph of an unidentified woman and discovers that Louie’s listed emergency contact number belongs to the hospital. Perlah is shaken by his death, so Dana has Emma assist in preparing Louie’s body for viewing, explaining how to position the deceased respectfully and to leave one arm uncovered so loved ones may hold their hand.

Brandon Li is admitted after falling from a motorcycle pyramid. Jackson regains consciousness but experiences another psychotic episode, which Dr. Caleb Jefferson manages with droperidol. Jayda becomes distressed about Jackson having a possible mental illness. Al-Hashimi recommends admitting inmate Gus Varney after a CT scan reveals vitamin deficiencies linked to prison malnutrition, but Robby raises concerns about bed shortages. Whitaker confides in Santos how he feels about Louie’s death, and later tells Robby that at least Louie always seemed happy.

In the break room, Langdon and Dana discuss his rehabilitation and twelve-step recovery process. Dana reveals that Doug Driscoll was arrested for assaulting her, though she declined to press charges, and that she abandoned retirement out of boredom. Santos treats Harlow Graham, a deaf patient, but struggles without a qualified ASL interpreter. After relying on Al-Hashimi’s AI charting tool without proofreading, she is reprimanded by a surgeon for errors that delay care, prompting further tension between Robby and Al-Hashimi.

Dana bonds with Gus, learning they both grew up in Pittsburgh, and alters his pulse oximeter readings, forcing Robby to admit him. Roxie’s planned discharge is postponed when her pain worsens. Staff later gather to pay their respects to Louie. Robby reveals that Louie’s wife and unborn child died in a car accident years earlier, leading to his alcoholism. With no family present, Emma holds Louie’s hand as the group says goodbye.

== Production ==
=== Development ===
The episode was written by Valerie Chu, and directed by main cast member Noah Wyle. It marked Chu's second writing credit, and Wyle's first directorial credit. Wyle was confirmed to direct an episode in August 2025.

Wyle said that he did not specifically direct the episode for "sentimental reasons", but that it all came down to logistics and scheduling. He also noted that as he is the lead actor, he had more time to prepare compared to other episodes, saying "in some ways, it's a lot easier for me to direct than it is other people in terms of the prep."

=== Writing ===
The episode features the death of Louie, a recurring character since the first season. The writers were hesitant over killing him, but eventually concluded that his death made sense for the story. Ernest Harden Jr., who plays Louie, commented, "they wouldn't want to make any kind of mistake that would look bad for me and Black people. They were very careful about all of that — they showed that it could happen to anybody, any one of us, if the right circumstances come about in your life." Gerran Howell added, "Life and death is a big thing in the ER, especially with Louie because he is one of our frequent flyers and has become a staple in the hospital. I think everybody thought Louie was going to outlive us all."

On Langdon's ask for forgiveness, Katherine LaNasa said that her character absolutely forgave him, but Wyle's directing prompted her to approach it in a different way, "at the end of the day, kind of what he was saying was, ‘You don't have time for this today.’ It was a little bit the theme of the one before, but he wanted him to feel uncomfortable. He wanted me to not entirely be able to take care of him. So, maybe behind, ‘You didn't call me,’ when I'm like, ‘Sorry.’ I got to a place where it's unspoken." She also added that Dana came back after the assault "because this is where she has her sense of purpose, where she finds meaning in her life, where she knows that she's useful and important in a way that really matters — when people are in their worst days, having their largest traumas."

Wyle said that even though Langdon tries to make amends, Robby still has difficulty in accepting that, explaining "That's the stuff we worked through over the course of the season. You want to believe in the beginning that it's a sense of betrayal and dishonesty that's at root there. And then you get a sense that it might be a little bit of tough love. Like, 'don't come back here and think that everything is going to be hunky-dory. You kind of have to earn your keep again.'"

On the final scene, Wyle said, "Those types of things are really lovely as a storyteller, to go back and sort of pepper through and directorial I just wanted that to be consistent, so that when we finally get that last image of Louie, we're finally taking the full measure of the man. We present the man and all of his dignity, as much as we can afford him in that moment – and then it's tick tock. We got to go get out there, because there's other Louis' to save." He also said, "as much time as we would love to take to confer this man's dignity and to wrap up his life, we've got eight more Louies out there that we can still save. So, even though this is a funeral, it's a funeral with a clock."

=== Filming ===
Filming for the episode started on August 19, 2025.

=== Music ===
For the final scene and the end credits, Andrew Bird and series composer Gavin Brivik wrote the song "Need Someone" for the episode. For Bird, the challenge was that "the song has to encapsulate what the characters are feeling without being too on the nose." He drew inspiration from a visit to the doctor, where he saw a nurse chatting with a lot of people, "I was thinking about how healthcare workers are oftentimes the most interaction that older people have socially towards the end of their life."

== Critical reception ==
"12:00 P.M." received critical acclaim, with reviewers praising the performances, emotional weight, writing, and Wyle's direction. Jesse Schedeen of IGN gave the episode a "good" 7 out of 10 rating and wrote in his verdict, "“12:00 P.M.” captures both the best and worst of The Pitt Season 2. On one hand, this episode mines a terrific amount of drama out of the sad fate of Louie Cloverfield. But in between the scenes centered around his death and the emotional fallout, this episode struggles on other fronts. Between a fairly underwhelming new medical case and the way the series is going to great lengths to make us dislike some of the newer characters, this episode frustrates as often as it satisfies."

Caroline Siede of The A.V. Club gave the episode an "A–" grade and wrote, "“12:00 P.M.” is full of the sort of unfinished, ongoing threads that define a season of The Pitt, but it also has its own self-contained arc and strong thematic through-line. The staff of the Pitt may not spend their lunch hour actually eating lunch. But that's just because they’re too busy delivering one of the most moving episodes of the season."

Maggie Fremont of Vulture gave the episode a 4 star rating out of 5 and wrote, "The care she takes as they set him up in the viewing room for people to pay their respects, the note about tucking him in tight but leaving one hand out so people can hold it if they want, it is quiet and moving. The Pitt excels at making chaotic choreography look controlled, but quiet moments like these are so effective and potent — I'm thinking about you, “Kiara and Lupe identify bodies in the pediatrics room” scene."

Frazier Tharpe of GQ wrote, "This is The Pitt at its best — a classic Wyle voice-caught-in-his-throat performance, thoughtful meditations on life and death, and arcs forging forward in the background. We're just barely a third of the way through the season — I haven't watched ahead yet, but if things are getting this real, this early, there’s no sophomore slump in sight for this great show." Evan Romano of Men's Health wrote, "This is why we watch The Pitt. There are the exciting moments, the compelling moments, the great back and forths that make us love these characters and care about what they have going on. But when The Pitt is at its very best — as it is in the "12:00 P.M." episode — it will make us just totally break down in tears."

Johnny Loftus of Decider wrote, "The tragedy of his wife and unborn child dying in a car crash. “Louie never really came back from that,” he says, almost to himself, and this time the silence around their patient isn't startling, but reverent. Emma takes Louie's hand. In watching and listening, she has learned a lot about nursing and life today." Adam Patla of Telltale TV gave the episode a 4.3 star rating out of 5 and wrote, "“12:00 PM” is a sobering episode, but it brings the “why” of this job back into focus amid the chaos. Someone has to care and sometimes that care can make all the difference. Louie passed, but in his final moments he was safe with people who cared for him."

Sean T. Collins of The New York Times wrote, "Even so, lives depend on them doing exactly that. These professionals must make their peace with this incontrovertible fact before every shift. If Dr. Robby needs a three-month, 2,000-mile sabbatical, can you blame him? Perhaps it should be mandatory, Pitt-wide. (Helmets are not optional.)" Jasmine Blu of TV Fanatic gave the episode a 4.3 star rating out of 5 and wrote, "The Pitt has a great way of honoring the unsung heroes. And The Pitt Season 2 Episode 6 is a strong hour because it highlights one of the quiet triumphs this season, allowing the nurses to truly shine."

=== Accolades ===
Award	Category	Nominee(s)	Result	Ref.
Primetime Emmy Awards	Outstanding Directing for a Drama Series	Noah Wyle	Nominated	
Primetime Emmy Awards	Outstanding Writing for a Drama Series	Valerie Chu	Nominated	
Primetime Creative Arts Emmy Awards	Outstanding Original Music and Lyrics	"Need Someone" – Gavin Brivik (Music) and Andrew Bird (Music & Lyrics)	Won	
