= Tina Ivlev =

American film and television actress

- Occupations: Film and television actress
- Years active: 2008–present

Tina Ivlev is an American film and television actress. For her performance as Ilana Miller in the HBO Max medical drama television series The Pitt, she was nominated for a Primetime Emmy Award in the category Outstanding Guest Actress in a Drama Series.

In addition to her Primetime Emmy Award nomination, she guest-starred in television programs including MacGyver, Days of Our Lives, Boston Legal and Weeds, and played the role of Natalia in the CBS soap opera television series The Young and the Restless. She also appeared in films such as The Devil's in the Details, Deadtectives and Crimes of the Mind.

She starred as Eve in the horror-thriller Bound to Vengeance (FKA Reversal), which had its world premiere at the Sundance Film Festival midnight section in 2015.
