= Shawn Hatosy =

American actor (born 1975)

- Hatosy in 2026
- Born: December 29, 1975 (age 50); Ijamsville, Frederick County, Maryland, U.S.
- Occupations: Actor, Director
- Years active: 1995–present
- Spouse: Kelly Albanese (m. 2010)
- Children: 3

Shawn Wayne Hatosy (/hætəsi/ HAT-ə-see; born December 29, 1975) is an American actor and director. He is best known for his roles in the films In & Out (1997), The Faculty (1998), Outside Providence, Anywhere but Here (both 1999), The Cooler (2003), Alpha Dog (2006), and Ready or Not 2: Here I Come (2026).

He is also well known for his collaboration with longtime television producer and partner John Wells with roles as Detective Sammy Bryant on TNT crime drama series Southland (2009–2013), Andrew "Pope" Cody in TNT crime drama series Animal Kingdom (2016–2022), and Dr. Jack Abbot in HBO Max medical drama series The Pitt (2025–present). For his acting in the Pitt, he won the Primetime Emmy Award for Outstanding Guest Actor in a Drama Series in 2025 and received a nomination for Primetime Emmy Award for Outstanding Supporting Actor in a Drama Series in 2026.

== Early life and education ==
Shawn Hatosy was born in Ijamsville, Frederick County, Maryland, to Carole, a loan officer, and Wayne Hatosy, a graphic designer. His sister Tonya Hatosy-Stier is well-known in Frederick for her philantrophic work. Hatosy is of Hungarian and Irish ancestry; he describes himself as working class.

Hatosy grew up in Green Valley, attending New Market Middle School and Linganore High School, where he graduated in 1994. He began to perform in school plays from the age of 10, and, as a teenager, he was also interested in musicals and community theater. His has also cited his high school drama teacher Carl Freundel as an early creative inspiration to him. He decided to pursue his acting professionally following one semester of community college.

== Career ==
=== Film and television ===
Hatosy appeared in commercials at the start of his career. His first film appearance was in Home for the Holidays (1995); his first television appearance was in Homicide: Life on the Street (1993–1999). In 1996, he moved to New York and secured representation through a recommendation from the casting director from Homicide: Life on the Street. His breakout role came in the film In & Out (1997).

His first leading role on film was in Outside Providence (1999), where he played a working-class boy sent to an elite preparatory school. Director Michael Corrente praised his sincere and authentic attitude, describing it as a "talent". Wayne Wang, who Hatosy worked with in Anywhere But Here (1999), compared him to Sean Penn. Kristin Hohenadel wrote for The New York Times in 1999, "Those who have worked with Hatosy say that it's his sweet-tough image and his ability to come off as a real person that give the young actor his appeal." During this period, Hatosy stated that he enjoyed working with experienced industry professionals because he could learn from them in the process.

Hatosy played Officer Sammy Bryant on Southland (2009–2013), executive produced by John Wells. His portrayal of his character's mental health issues received praise from critics. Hatosy collaborated with John Wells again for Animal Kingdom (2016–2022) as Andrew "Pope" Cody, a mentally ill ex-con. IndieWire said Hatosy delivered a "powerhouse performance" as Pope, and similar praise was issued from Variety and The Hollywood Reporter. He additionally directed four episodes of Animal Kingdom and one episode of Rescue: HI-Surf (2024–2025), in which he also acted. Hatosy starred as Deputy Chief Charlie Reid in Chicago P.D. season 12.

Since 2025, he has held a recurring role as Dr. Jack Abbot in the HBO Max medical drama The Pitt. Initially, Hatosy was skeptical of his suitability for Abbot's part; he was convinced to take the role because of his positive experiences working with executive producer John Wells. The Pitt marks their fifth project together. He won the Primetime Emmy Award for Outstanding Guest Actor in a Drama Series at the 77th Primetime Emmy Awards for its first season. He has been nominated for the Primetime Emmy Award for Outstanding Supporting Actor in a Drama Series of the 78th Primetime Emmy Awards for the second season.

Hatosy starred as Titus Danforth in Ready or Not: Here I Come (2026). He was praised for his performance and chemistry with Sarah Michelle Gellar.

=== Other work ===
In 2001, Hatosy starred alongside Brittany Murphy in Wheatus' music video for their cover of "A Little Respect". He also appeared with Scarlett Johansson in the music video for "What Goes Around... Comes Around" by Justin Timberlake.

In 2026, Hatosy was selected to narrate Yes, Chef, a two-episode immersive audio romance for audio erotica app Quinn. At the time of its release, it was the first Quinn production to star a man over the age of 50, and more than 100,000 people listened to the first episode within 12 hours of its release.

Hatosy has performed in theater. In 2001, he took on the title role in the La Jolla Playhouse production of The Collected Works of Billy the Kid. Off-Broadway, he starred opposite Anna Paquin in the Paul Weitz comedy Roulette in 2004. The following year, Hatosy performed opposite Al Pacino in Lyle Kessler's Orphans at the Greenway Court Theatre in Los Angeles.

== Personal life ==
Hatosy married actress Kelly Albanese in December 2010. They have three sons.

In 2026, in response to the intense commentary sparked by fans of The Pitt, Hatosy took a break from using social media. He had previously been well-known for his online fan interactions.

== Filmography ==
=== Film ===
Year	Title	Role	Notes	Ref.
1995	Home for the Holidays	Counter Boy	Cameo appearance	
1996	No Way Home	Sean		
1997	All Over Me	Gus		
1997	Inventing the Abbotts	Victor		
1997	Niagara, Niagara	Lead High School Punk	Cameo appearance	
1997	In & Out	Jack		
1997	The Postman	Billy		
1998	The Faculty	Stan Rosado		
1999	The Joyriders	Cam		
1999	Outside Providence	Tim Dunphy		
1999	Simpatico	Young Vinnie Webb		
1999	Anywhere but Here	Benny		
2000	Down to You	Eddie Hicks		
2000	Borstal Boy	Brendan Behan		
2001	Tangled	David Klein		
2002	John Q.	Mitch Quigley		
2003	A Guy Thing	Jim		
2003	The Cooler	Mikey Lootz		
2003	11:14	Duffy Nichols		
2003	Dallas 362	Rusty		
2003	Soldier’s Girl	Justin Fisher		
2005	Swimmers	Clyde Tyler		
2005	Little Athens	Carter		
2006	Alpha Dog	Elvis Schmidt		
2006	Factory Girl	Syd Pepperman		
2007	Nobel Son	Thaddeus James		
2008	Familiar Strangers	Brian Worthington		
2008	The Lazarus Project	Ricky Garvey		
2009	Public Enemies	FBI Agent John Madala		
2009	Bad Lieutenant: Port of Call New Orleans	Detective Armand Benoit		
2011	Street Kings 2: Motor City	Detective Dan Sullivan	Direct-to-video film	
2018	Mountain Rest	Bascolm		
2019	The Bygone	Paris		
2022	Mosquito	Humphrey Bowls		
2024	Unstoppable	Tom Brands		
2026	Ready or Not 2: Here I Come	Titus Danforth		

=== Television ===
Key
†	Denotes television productions that have not yet been released

Year	Title	Role	Notes	Ref.
1995	Homicide: Life on the Street	Lyle Warner	Episode: "The Old and the Dead"	
1995	Inflammable	Quentin Vale	Television film	
1996	Double Jeopardy	Derek Kaminski	Television film	
1996	Law & Order	Chester Manning	Episode: "Savior"	
1999	Witness Protection	Sean Batton	Television film	
2001–2002	Felicity	Owen	Episodes: "Moving On" & "Future Shock"	
2002	Six Feet Under	Brody Farrell	Episode: "In the Game"	
2003	Soldier's Girl	Justin Fisher	Television film	
2003	The Twilight Zone	Mario Devlin	Episode: "The Pharaoh's Curse"	
2004	The Winning Season	Adult Joseph Stoshack	Television film	
2005	CSI: Crime Scene Investigation	Jeff Simon	Episode: "Weeping Willows"	
2005	Faith of My Fathers	John McCain	Television film	
2006	ER	Willis Peyton	Episode: "Jigsaw"	
2006–2007	Numb3rs	Dwayne Carter	Recurring role; 3 episodes (seasons 3-4)	
2007	Drive	Rob Laird	Episode: "Unaired Pilot"	
2007	My Name Is Earl	John Clevenger	Episode: "Burn Victim"	
2008	The Apostles	Peter McBride	Television film	
2009	Law & Order: Criminal Intent	Larry Clay	Episode: "Salome in Manhattan"	
2009–2013	Southland	Sammy Bryant	Main role; 43 episodes	
2010	Dexter	Boyd Fowler	Episodes: "Hello, Bandit" & "Practically Perfect"	
2010	CSI: Miami	Jason Kreeger	Episode: "Sleepless in Miami"	
2011	Law & Order: LA	Larry Sheppard	Episode: "Hayden Tract"	
2011	Hawaii Five-0	Marshall Martell	Episode: "Ka Hakaka Maika'i"	
2011	Criminal Minds	Jimmy Hall	Episode: "The Bittersweet Science"	
2012	Law & Order: Special Victims Unit	Kevin Fahey	Episode: "Valentine's Day"	
2012	Longmire	Levi Giggs	Episode: "8 Seconds"	
2012	Christine	Ron	Episode: "Ron"	
2013	Body of Proof	Karl Simmons	Episodes: "Abducted: Parts 1 & 2"	
2014	Reckless	Terry McCandless	Main role; 13 episodes	
2015	Fear the Walking Dead	Corporal Andrew Adams	Recurring role; 3 episodes (season 1)	
2015	Bosch	Johnny Stokes	Recurring role; 4 episodes (season 1)	
2016–2022	Animal Kingdom	Andrew "Pope" Cody	Main role; 75 episodes (also directed 4 episodes)	
2017	Flaked	Karel	Recurring role; 4 episodes (season 2)	
2022	SEAL Team	Marc Lee	Episode: "Keys to Heaven"	
2023	Law & Order	Officer Nick Riley	Episode: "Heroes"	
2024–2025	Rescue: HI-Surf	Clayton Emerson	Recurring role; 6 episodes (also directed episode: "Surge")	
2024–2025	Chicago P.D.	Deputy Chief Charlie Reid	Recurring role; 9 episodes (season 12)	
2025–present	The Pitt	Dr. Jack Abbot	Recurring role; 11 episodes (also directed episode: "3:00 P.M.")	
2025–present	Fire Country	Brett Richards	Recurring role; 7 episodes (season 4)	
TBA	Cry Wolf †	TBA	Main role	

=== Music video ===
Year	Title	Artist	Role	Ref.
2001	A Little Respect	Wheatus	Main male lead	
2007	What Goes Around... Comes Around	Justin Timberlake	Drunk Love Interest	

=== Theatre ===
Year	Title	Role	Notes	Ref.
2001	The Collected Works of Billy the Kid	William H. Bonney (aka "Billy the Kid")	by Michael Ondaatje at the La Jolla Playhouse	
2004	Roulette	Jock	by Paul Weitz at the John Houseman Theatre	
2005	Orphans	Treat	by Lyle Kessler at the Greenway Court Theatre	

=== Audiobook ===
Year	Title	Role	Notes	Ref.
2026	Yes, Chef	Grant Reilly, main character	a two-episode immersive audio romance for audio erotica app Quinn	

=== Video Games ===
Year	Title	Role	Notes	Ref.
2026	Call of Duty: Modern Warfare 4	Colonel Shaw		

== Awards and nominations ==
Year	Award	Category	Nominated work	Result
2004	8th Golden Satellite Awards	Best Supporting Actor in a Series, Miniseries, or Television Film	Soldier's Girl	Nominated
2011	1st Critics' Choice Television Awards	Best Supporting Actor in a Drama Series	Southland	Nominated
2011	Peabody Awards	Entertainment	Southland	Won
2025	77th Primetime Emmy Awards	Outstanding Guest Actor in a Drama Series	The Pitt (for "9:00 P.M.")	Won
2026	78th Primetime Emmy Awards	Outstanding Supporting Actor in a Drama Series	The Pitt	Nominated
