= Taylor Dearden =

American actress (born 1993)

- Born: Taylor Dearden Cranston; February 12, 1993 (age 33); Los Angeles, California, U.S.
- Education: University of Southern California (BA)
- Occupation: Actress
- Years active: 2010–present
- Parents: Bryan Cranston (father); Robin Dearden (mother)
- Relatives: Joseph Cranston (paternal grandfather)

Taylor Dearden Cranston (born February 12, 1993) is an American actress. She plays Dr. Melissa "Mel" King in HBO Max's The Pitt, for which she was nominated for the Primetime Emmy Award for Outstanding Supporting Actress in a Drama Series in 2026. She also played Ophelia in the MTV show Sweet/Vicious and Chloe Lyman in the second season of Netflix's American Vandal.

== Early life and education ==
Taylor Dearden Cranston was born in Los Angeles, California, on February 12, 1993. She is the daughter of actors Bryan Cranston and Robin Gale Dearden. Her paternal grandfather was producer and actor Joseph Cranston. In 2015, she graduated from the University of Southern California with a BA in theater.

== Career ==
Dearden's first on-screen appearance was in the Breaking Bad episode "No Más". Although her father directed the episode, he claimed that he did not cast her in the role (listed in the credits as "Sad Faced Girl"). This appearance occurred in 2010.

From 2013 to 2014, Dearden portrayed the character McKenzie in two seasons of the web series 101 Ways to Get Rejected. The show was created and written by fellow USC student Susie Yankou and was directed by Mike Effenberger.

Her first major television role came with the MTV show Sweet/Vicious. Following in audition in Los Angeles, Dearden was cast as Ophelia, a college student who avenges rape victims. The show lasted for one season. Creator Jennifer Kaytin Robinson praised Dearden and her co-star Eliza Bennett, saying, "Our schedule was not easy and they did not get a lot of takes, but you would never know it because they're so incredible. We couldn't have made the show without them." Reviewers praised Dearden for the comedic skills she displayed in the role.

In 2018, Dearden appeared in season two of the Netflix mockumentary American Vandal, where she played the character Chloe Lyman, a student who invites the crew to investigate a mystery at her high school. Her performance in this role was positively received, and Daniel Fienberg, writing for The Hollywood Reporter, was disappointed that she was not better utilised in the show.

She portrays Dr. Melissa King in the 2025 HBO Max medical drama The Pitt and was nominated for the Astra TV Award for Best Supporting Actress in a Drama Series and the Dorian Award for Best Supporting TV Performance in that role. She was also nominated for Best Supporting Performance in a New Scripted Series at the 2026 Film Independent Spirit Awards. In January 2026, Dearden appeared on Jimmy Kimmel Live! In March 2026, Dearden won an Actor Award for Outstanding Performance by an Ensemble in a Drama Series, for The Pitt. In April 2026, Dearden appeared on The Tonight Show Starring Jimmy Fallon.

== Personal life ==
Dearden revealed in 2025 that she has ADHD, which was diagnosed during her childhood. She has described how this influenced her portrayal of Dr. Mel King, and how the fast-paced filming of The Pitt has been challenging to her as a neurodivergent actress. She also has Ehlers–Danlos syndrome.

== Filmography ==
=== Film ===
Year	Title	Role	Notes
2012	Red Handed	Jo	Short film Co-executive producer
2013	The Fourth Wall	Danielle	Short film
2015	The Cigarette	—N/a	Short film Director
2016	Smash Face	Helen	Short film
2017	Heartthrob	Cleo	
2020	The Last Champion	Joanna Miller	
2025	Ok Mom	Hannah	Short film

=== Television ===
Year	Title	Role	Notes
2010	Breaking Bad	Sad Faced Girl	Episode: "No Más"
2016–2017	Sweet/Vicious	Ophelia Mayer	10 episodes
2018	American Vandal	Chloe Lyman	8 episodes
2022	For All Mankind	Sunny Hall	3 episodes
2023	The Last Thing He Told Me	Cheryl	Episode: "Witness to Your Life"
2023	Invincible	Nurse / Receptionist / Volunteer (voice)	Episode: "Invincible: Atom Eve"
2025–present	The Pitt	Dr. Melissa King	Series regular; 30 episodes
2026	The Simpsons	Intern (voice)	Episode: "Irrational Treasure"
2026	Nobody Wants This	Molly	Episode: “Watch What Happens”

=== Web ===
Year	Title	Role	Notes
2013–2014	101 Ways to Get Rejected	McKenzie	18 episodes Script supervisor

== Awards and honors ==
Year	Award	Category	Work	Result	Ref.
2025	Astra TV Awards	Best Supporting Actress in a Drama Series	The Pitt	Nominated	
2025	Dorian Awards	Best Supporting TV Performance	The Pitt	Nominated	
2026	Actor Awards	Outstanding Performance by an Ensemble in a Drama Series	The Pitt	Won	
2026	Film Independent Spirit Awards	Best Supporting Performance in a New Scripted Series	The Pitt	Nominated	
2026	Astra TV Awards	Best Supporting Actress in a Drama Series	The Pitt	Nominated	
2026	Primetime Emmy Awards	Outstanding Supporting Actress in a Drama Series	The Pitt	Nominated	
