= List of historical Indian reservations in the United States =

This is a list of historical Indian reservations in the United States. These Indian and Half-breed Reservations and Reserves were either disestablished or revoked. Few still exist as a considerably smaller remnant, or have been merged with other Indian Reservations, or recognised by state governments (such as Oklahoma Tribal Statistical Area also known as OTSA) but not by the US federal government.

== Historical American Indian reservations ==
=== A ===
- Amaknak Island Reserve (Amaknak Island, Alaska)—revoked by Alaska Native Claims Settlement Act
- Arikarees, Gros Ventre and Mandan Indian Reservation (North Dakota/Montana)—smaller remnant exists as part of Fort Berthold Indian Reservation (North Dakota)
- Ashkum Indian Reservation (Indiana)—disestablished
- Au Foin River Indian Reserves (Michigan)—disestablished
- Au Sable River Indian Reserve (Michigan)—former 8,000 acre Reserve of the Saginaw Chippewa Tribal Nation; disestablished
- Aubbeenaubbee Indian Reservation (Indiana)—disestablished
- Auglaize Indian Reserve (Ohio)—disestablished
- Awn-kote Indian Reservation (Illinois)—disestablished

=== B ===
- Beaubien Indian Reserves (Michigan)—disestablished
- Bertrand Indian Reserves (Michigan)—disestablished
- Big Rock Indian Reserve (Michigan)—former 10,000 acre Reserve of the Saginaw Chippewa Tribal Nation; disestablished
- Big Spring Reserve (Ohio)—disestablished
- Black Bird Indian Community (Michigan)—former 6,000 acre Reserve of the Saginaw Chippewa Tribal Nation; disestablished
- Black Loon Indian Reservation (Indiana)—disestablished
- Blanchard's Fork Reserve (Ohio)—disestablished
- Brotherton Indian Reservation (New Jersey)
- Bourbonné Indian Reserve (Illinois)—disestablished
- Buffalo Creek Reservation (New York)—disestablished

=== C ===
- Cayuga Cattaraugus Indian Reservation (NY) disestablished 1964 but recognized land claims 1995-2008 supreme court USA
- Caddo-Wichita-Delaware Indian Reservation (OK)—disestablished but recognized as the Caddo-Wichita-Delaware OTSA
- Caldwell Indian Reserve (IL)—disestablished
- Cass Lake Indian Reservation (MN)—merged with Leech Lake Indian Reservation
- Chandler Indian Reserve (MI)—disestablished
- Charley Indian Reservation (IN)—disestablished
- Chechaukkose Indian Reservation (IN)—disestablished
- Cherokee Indian Reservation (KS)—disestablished
- Cherokee Indian Reservation (OK)—disestablished but recognized as the Cherokee OTSA
- Cheyenne-Arapaho Indian Reservation (OK)—disestablished but recognized as the Cheyenne-Arapaho OTSA
- Chickasaw Indian Reservation (OK)—disestablished but recognized as the Chickasaw OTSA
- Chilkat Fisheries Reserve (AK)—revoked by Alaska Native Claims Settlement Act
- Chinquaqua Indian Reservation (IN)—disestablished
- Chippewa Indian Reservation (KS)—disestablished
- Chippewa Indian Reservation (MN)—merged with Leech Lake Indian Reservation
- Choctaw Indian Reservation (OK)—disestablished but recognized as the Choctaw OTSA
- Chopine Indian Reservation (Allen County, IN)—disestablished
- Chopine Indian Reservation (Whitley County, IN)—disestablished
- Citizen Potawatomi Nation-Absentee Shawnee Indian Reservation (OK)—disestablished but recognized as the Citizen Potawatomi Nation-Absentee Shawnee OTSA
- Coastal Indian Reservation (OR)—smaller remnant exists as the Siletz Indian Reservation
- Creek Indian Reservation (OK)—disestablished but recognized as the Creek OTSA

=== D ===
- Delaware Indian Reservation (KS)—disestablished
- Des Moines Half-Breed Reservation (IA)—disestablished

=== E ===
- Eastern Shawnee Indian Reservation (OK)—disestablished but recognized as the Eastern Shawnee OTSA
- Elim Reserve (Elim, AK)—revoked by Alaska Native Claims Settlement Act
- Elkhart Indian Reserves (IN)—disestablished

=== F ===
- Fairplain Indian Reserves (MI)—disestablished
- Flat Belly Indian Reservation (IN)—disestablished
- Flint River Indian Reserve (MI)—a.k.a. Pewonigowink Reserve, 5,760 acre Reserve of the Saginaw Chippewa Tribal Nation; disestablished

=== G ===
- Godfroy Reserve (IN)—disestablished
- Great Sioux Reservation (ND/SD/NE)—smaller remnants exist as, or as part of, the Cheyenne River Indian Reservation, Lower Brule Indian Reservation, Pine Ridge Indian Reservation, Standing Rock Indian Reservation and Upper Brulé Indian Reservation (which its smaller remnant exists as the Rosebud Indian Reservation).
- Gros Ventre, Piegan Blood, Blackfeet and River Crow Indian Reservation (MT)—smaller remnants exist as the Blackfeet Indian Reservation, Fort Belknap Indian Reservation and Fort Peck Indian Reservation, with Rocky Boy's Indian Reservation established in within the former Indian Reservation boundaries, in addition to scattered parcels of the Turtle Mountain Indian Reservation.
- Gull Lake Indian Reservation (MN)—disestablished

=== H ===
- Hog Creek Reserve (OH)—disestablished
- Hole in the Days Indian Reservation (MN)—disestablished

=== I ===
- Île-à-l'Ail Indian Reservation (IN)—a.k.a. Bondie Reserve; disestablished
- Iowa Indian Reservation (OK)—disestablished but recognized as the Iowa OTSA

=== J ===
- Juaneño Indian Rancheria (CA) - disestablished, the Juaneno Band of Mission Indians claim the former Marine Corps Air Station El Toro was their historical Indian Reservation.

=== K ===
- Kansa Indian Reservation (KS)—disestablished
- Karluk Fishing Reserve (Karluk, AK)—revoked by Alaska Native Claims Settlement Act
- Kaw Indian Reservation (OK)—disestablished but recognized as the Kaw OTSA
- Kawkawlin Indian Reserve (MI)—6,000 acre Reserve of the Saginaw Chippewa Tribal Nation; disestablished
- Keokuk's Reserve (IA)—disestablished
- Ketchewaundaugenick Indian Reserve (MI)—a.k.a. Big Lick Reserve, 3,000 acre Reserve of the Saginaw Chippewa Tribal Nation; disestablished
- Kewanna Indian Reservation (IN)—disestablished
- Kickapoo Indian Reservation (OK)—disestablished but recognized as the Kickapoo OTSA
- Kiowa-Comanche-Apache-Fort Sill Apache Indian Reservation (OK)—disestablished but recognized as the Kiowa-Comanche-Apache-Fort Sill Apache OTSA
- Klukwan Reservation (Klukwan, AK)—revoked by Alaska Native Claims Settlement Act

=== L ===
- LaFramboise Reserve (IL)—disestablished
- LaFramboise Reserve (IN)—disestablished
- Lake Pepin Half-Breed Reservation (MN)—disestablished
- Lake Winnibigoshish Indian Reservation (MN)—merged with Leech Lake Indian Reservation
- LeClerc Reserve (IL)—disestablished
- Lewistown Reserve (OH)—disestablished
- Little Forks Indian Reserve (MI)—6,000 acre Reserve of the Saginaw Chippewa Tribal Nation; disestablished

=== M ===
- Machesaw Indian Reservation (IN)—disestablished
- Malheur Indian Reservation (OR)—disestablished
- Mazaqua Indian Reservation (IN)—disestablished
- Me-naw-che Indian Reserve (MI)—disestablished
- Memotway Indian Reservation (IN)—disestablished
- Menominee Indian Reservation (IN)—disestablished
- Menoequet Indian Community (MI)—1,000 acre Reserve of the Saginaw Chippewa Tribal Nation; disestablished
- Meshingomeshia Indian Reservation (IN)—disestablished
- Mesquabuck Indian Reservation (IN)—disestablished
- Metlakatla Indian Reserve (AK)—smaller remnant exists as the Annette Island Reserve
- Metosanyah Indian Reservation (IN)—disestablished
- Miami Indian Reservation (KS)—disestablished
- Miami Indian Reservation (OK)—disestablished but recognized as the Miami OTSA
- Minemaung Reserve (IL)—disestablished
- Miranda Reserve (IL)—disestablished
- Mo-ah-way Reserve (IL)—disestablished
- Modoc Indian Reservation (OK)—disestablished but recognized as the Modoc OTSA
- Monguago Indian Reserve (MI)—disestablished
- Monoquet Indian Community (IN)—disestablished
- Moose Dungs Indian Reservation (MN)—disestablished
- Mota Indian Reservation (IN)—disestablished
- Mukkose Indian Reservation (IN)—disestablished

=== N ===
- Na-au-say Reserve (IL)—a.k.a. Waish-kee-shaw Reserve; disestablished
- Nabobask Indian Reserve (MI)—a.k.a. Nanabish or Nebobish Reserve, 2,000 acre Reserve of the Saginaw Chippewa Tribal Nation; disestablished
- Naswawkee Indian Reservation (IN)—disestablished
- Neahlongqua Indian Reservation (IN)—disestablished
- Nemaha Half-Breed Reservation (NE)—disestablished
- New York Indian Reservation (KS)—disestablished
- Neutrals Indian Reservation (KS)—disestablished
- Niobrara Indian Reservation (NE)—smaller remnant exists as the Santee Sioux Indian Reservation
- North Maumee River Reserve (OH)—disestablished
- Nottoway Indian Reservation (VA)—disestablished

=== O ===
- Ogallala Sioux Indian Reservation (SD/NE)—smaller remnant exists as the Pine Ridge Indian Reservation (SD)
- Ogee Reserve (IL)—disestablished
- Okawmause Indian Reservation (IN)—disestablished
- Osage Indian Reservation (KS)—disestablished
- Otoe Indian Reservation (KS/NE)—disestablished
- Otoe-Missouria Indian Reservation (OK)—disestablished but recognized as the Otoe-Missouria OTSA
- Ottawa Indian Reservation (OK)—disestablished but recognized as the Ottawa OTSA
- Ottawas of Blanchard's Fork Indian Reservation (KS)—disestablished
- Ottawas of Roche de Boeuf and Wolf Rapids Indian Reservation (KS)—disestablished
- Otusson Indian Community (MI)—8,000 acre Reserve of the Saginaw Chippewa Tribal Nation; disestablished
- Ouilmette Reserve (IL)—disestablished

=== P ===
- Pankishaw and Wia Indian Reservation (KS)—disestablished
- Pawnee Indian Reservation (NE)—disestablished
- Pawnee Indian Reservation (OK)—disestablished but recognized as the Pawnee OTSA
- Paw Paw Grove Reserve (IL)—a.k.a. As-sim-in-eh-kon Reserve; disestablished
- Peoria and Kaskaskia Indian Reservation (KS)—disestablished
- Peoria Indian Reservation (OK)—disestablished but recognized as the Peoria OTSA
- Point Au Gres Indian Reserve (MI)—2,000 acre Reserve of the Saginaw Chippewa Tribal Nation; disestablished
- Pokegama Lake Indian Reservation (MN)—disestablished; was located along the Mississippi River near Grand Rapids, MN
- Pokegama Lake Indian Settlement (MN)—merged with Mille Lacs Indian Reservation; located by the Snake River near Pine City, MN
- Ponca Indian Reservation (SD/NE)—disestablished. A new reservation Ponca Indian Reservation (NE) re-established, within the original exterior boundaries of the Ponca Indian Reservation (SD/NE) but exterior of the smaller remnant of it before its disestablishment.
- Ponca Indian Reservation (OK)—disestablished but recognized as the Ponca OTSA
- Portsmouth Indian Reserve (MI)—640 acre Reserve of the Saginaw Chippewa Tribal Nation located at the Great Bend of the Cass River; disestablished
- Potawatomi Indian Reservation (KS)—smaller remnant exists as the Prairie Band Potawatomi Indian Reservation
- Pothier Reserve (IL)—disestablished

=== Q ===
- Quapaw Indian Reservation (OK)—disestablished but recognized as the Quapaw OTSA

=== R ===
- Rabbit Lake Indian Reservation (MN)—disestablished
- Rifle River Indian Reserve (MI)—a.k.a. Mishowusk Reserve, 2,000 acre Reserve of the Saginaw Chippewa Tribal Nation; disestablished
- Robinson Reserve (IL)—disestablished
- Roche de Bœuf Reserve (OH)—disestablished

=== S ===
- Sac and Fox Indian Reservation (NE)—disestablished; not to be confused with the nearby Sac and Fox Indian Reservation (KS/NE)
- Sac and Fox Indian Reservation (OK)—disestablished but recognized as the Sac and Fox OTSA
- Saginaw Bay Indian Reservation (MI)—40,000 acre Reserve of the Saginaw Chippewa Tribal Nation, smaller remnant now exists as part of the Isabella Indian Reservation (MI)
- Saginaw River Indian Reserve (MI)—1,000 acre Reserve of the Saginaw Chippewa Tribal Nation; disestablished
- Sebastian Indian Reservation (CA)—established in 1853; disestablished
- Seminole Indian Reservation (OK)—disestablished but recognized as the Seminole OTSA
- Seneca-Cayuga Indian Reservation (OK)—disestablished but recognized as the Seneca-Cayuga OTSA
- Seneca Reserve (OH)—disestablished
- Shab-eh-ney Reserve (IL)—disestablished
- Shawwawnassee Reserve (IL)—disestablished
- South Maumee River Reserve (OH)—disestablished
- Stony Island Indian Reserve (MI)—a.k.a. Shaingwaukokaug Reserve, approximately 1,000 acre Reserve of the Saginaw Chippewa Tribal Nation; disestablished

=== T ===
- Table Rock Indian Reservation (OR)—disestablished
- Tetlin Reserve (Tetlin, AK)—revoked by Alaska Native Claims Settlement Act
- Tonkawa Indian Reservation (OK)—disestablished but recognized as the Tonkawa OTSA
- Topeah Indian Reservation (IN)—disestablished

=== U ===
- Upper Brulé Indian Reservation (SD/NE)—smaller remnant exists as the Rosebud Indian Reservation (SD)
- Upper Sandusky Reservation (OH)—disestablished

=== V ===
- Venetie Reserve (Venetie, AK)—revoked by Alaska Native Claims Settlement Act

=== W ===
- Wapakoneta Reserve (OH)—disestablished
- Wapasepah Indian Reservation (IN)—disestablished
- Wau-pon-eh-see Indian Reservation (IL)—disestablished
- Wesaw Indian Reservation (IN)—disestablished
- White Oak Point Indian Reservation (MN)—merged with Leech Lake Indian Reservation
- Wolf Rapids Reserve (OH)—disestablished
- Wyandotte Indian Reservation (OK)—disestablished but recognized as the Wyandotte OTSA
- Wyandott Reservation (OH)—disestablished

== See also ==
- Federally recognized tribes
- (Federally) unrecognized tribes
- Native Americans in the United States
- List of Alaska Native tribal entities
- List of Indian reservations in the United States
- National Park Service Native American Heritage Sites
- Outline of United States federal Indian law and policy
- State recognized tribes in the United States
