= Little River Band of Ottawa Indians =

Gaaching-Ziibi Daawaa Anishinaabe

Total population
- Enrolled members: 4,232 in July 2015

Regions with significant populations
- United States (Michigan)

Languages
- English, Ojibwe (Ottawa dialect)

Religion
- Traditional Tribal Religion^{a} -and- Christianity

Related ethnic groups
- Potawatomi, Ojibwe (Council of Three Fires)

Little River Band of Ottawa Indians (Ojibwe: Gaaching-Ziibi Daawaa Anishinaabe) is a federally recognized Native American tribe of the Odawa people in the United States. It is based in Manistee and Mason counties in northwest Michigan. It was recognized on September 21, 1994.

It is one of three federally recognized tribes of Odawa people in Michigan. The others are the Little Traverse Bay Bands of Odawa Indians and the Grand Traverse Band of Ottawa and Chippewa Indians. Other bands with federal status include the Ottawa Tribe of Oklahoma and several First Nations in Ontario, Canada. They historically spoke the Odawa language, a dialect of Anishinaabemowin (Ojibwe), but use of this language has declined.

== History ==
This area around the Manistee River was long occupied by bands of Ottawa and Chippewa (Ojibwe) peoples before European colonization. French fur traders visited the villages during the historic period of the 17th and 18th centuries.

In 1836 the United States government assigned the Ottawa to a reservation along the Manistee River by a treaty; this was part of the tribe's historic range. The treaty provided reservation lands for five years and provisions to move tribal members west beyond the Missouri River; however, the parties ratified in 1855. The new treaty provided the tribe with a reservation that included Custer and Eden townships in Mason County and Crystal and Elbridge townships in Oceana County.

Part of that land came back under tribal ownership in August 2000 when the Little River Band bought about 740 acres in Mason County.

The Little River Band of Ottawa Indians is one of 567 federally recognized tribes of Native Americans in the United States. On September 21, 1994, the tribal status of the Little River Band (along with that of the Little Traverse Bay Bands of Odawa Indians) was reaffirmed by the federal government when President Bill Clinton signed Senate Bill 1357 into law.

Since January 1994 the Little River Band has published a monthly newspaper, Currents. All editions are available on the official tribal website.

== Tribal government ==
The Band is the successor apparent to nine of the 19 historical Grand River Bands of Ottawa peoples who lived along the Thornapple, Grand, White, Pere Marquette, Manistee and its tributary Little Manistee rivers. The Little River Band operates its own constitutional government; it has three parts: executive, legislative and judicial. The Band holds regular elections for a nine-member legislative council and an Ogemakaan (Elected Chief). There is a separate but equal elected judicial branch. The government has 28 different departments dealing with various programs and processes necessary to running a modern government.

=== Membership ===
The Tribal Council has set the membership rules, based on blood quantum and descent from individuals recorded in historic bands of the region. Persons are eligible if 1/4 Native American, with at least 1/8 from Grand River Ottawa or Michigan Ottawa; and direct descent from a Native American of Manistee, Mason, Wexford or Lake counties in the State of Michigan or a person listed on the schedule of Grand River Ottawa in the "Durant Roll of 1908;" or is a lineal descendant of individuals listed on the "1870 Annuity Payrolls of Chippewas and Ottawas of Michigan," listed under certain Ottawa chiefs; and is not enrolled in another tribe. The Tribe also accepts: "Any child who is less than 18 years of age, who meets the membership criteria in Section 1, shall be eligible for membership, notwithstanding such adoption."

== Language ==
The Little River Band's original language Anishinaabemowin, an Algonquian language, is designated as "critically endangered" by the 2010 Atlas of the World's Languages in Danger of United Nations Educational, Scientific and Cultural Organization (UNESCO). Few elders and other members can still speak the full language. The Band is spread out far beyond their reservation, living in areas among the majority English-speaking culture, and the language is not commonly used.

== Little River Casino Resort ==
On December 3, 1998, Governor John Engler signed a compact between the Little River Band and the State of Michigan allowing gaming on reservation property; these efforts were spearheaded by Tribal Member Robert Guenthardt, who served as Head Chairperson, and would soon become the Little River Band of Ottawa Indians' first elected Ogema. In 1999 the Band opened the Little River Casino Resort on its Manistee Reservation. Since its opening the resort has expanded in multiple stages to more than 23,000 square feet of space. Its complex includes a 292-room luxury hotel, a 1,700-seat event center, and an expanding collection of slots and table games. The tribe has invested revenues from its gaming operations for economic development and to support the well-being of its people

== Notable people ==
- Margaret Bailey Chandler
- Andrew Blackbird

== Notes ==
^a: Native American religion

== See also ==
- Algonquian peoples
- Anishinaabe
- Ojibway
- Chippewa
- Potawatomi
