= Odawa Casino Resort =

Casino resort in Michigan, United States

- Interactive map of Odawa Casino Resort
- Location: 1760 Lears Road Petoskey, Michigan 49770; 45°21′10.44″N 84°58′45.12″W
- Opened: June 20, 2007
- No. of rooms: 137
- Gaming space: 50,000 sq ft (4,600 m^{2})
- Notable restaurants: Sage Restaurant; Waas-no-de Buffet (closed 2020); Copper Cafe
- Casino type: Land
- Owner: Little Traverse Bay Bands of Odawa Indians
- Previous names: Victories Casino
- Website: Odawa Casino Resort

Odawa Casino Resort is a Northern Michigan casino resort. Located in Resort Township near Petoskey, Michigan, the casino opened for business on June 20, 2007. It is owned and operated by the Little Traverse Bay Bands of Odawa Indians. The resort replaced Victories Casino in 2007, which had served as the tribe's casino until the new resort was opened. In addition to gaming, Odawa Casino Resort features multiple restaurants and retail outlets, a concert venue (Ovation Hall), a nightclub (The O Zone Nightclub), and a circular lounge bar in the middle of the gaming floor (Rendezvous). The resort also includes a AAA Diamond rated Hotel. Full shuttle transportation is available to all resort guests. Odawa Casino Resort is open to guests of all ages, however, the casino's gaming floor and the O Zone Nightclub are restricted to those of age 21 and older. Starting in 2011, the minimum gaming age at Odawa Casino Resort has been approved to be lowered to 19 years old. In 2020, the buffet was closed during the COVID-19 pandemic with no plans to reopen as of October 2023. On January 1, 2023, the gaming returned to 21, and guests under 21 can only visit the restaurants and cannot step onto the gaming floor.

== Gaming ==
The gaming floor is approximately 50,000 sq ft (4,600 m^{2}) and offers approximately 1200 slot machines in addition to 36 table games. Table games include blackjack, Count's Kustoms Bonus Blackjack, poker, roulette, craps, three card poker, Let it Ride, and Flushes Gone Wild. Over 100 high-definition televisions are scattered throughout the property. The televisions show promotions, live contests, and DirecTV satellite broadcasts. Major sporting events are commonly displayed. The poker room currently includes 4 tables. Bingo was offered in 2009, but is not currently operating. Odawa Casino Resort is open 24 hours a day.

== Entertainment ==
Ovation Hall is a concert venue located at Odawa Casino Resort. The hall can seat up to 1,000 people and hosts concerts, trade shows, and large conferences. Bill Cosby performed two shows at the grand opening celebration. Notable performers have included Regis Philbin, The B-52s, The Temptations, Billy Ray Cyrus, Joan Rivers, Don Rickles, and The Commodores.

The O Zone Nightclub is a circular nightclub featuring flair bartenders. The O Zone features DJs from radio stations "Big Country" and "106 KHQ". The club features a large display built into the ceiling that can play live video from the club. There are several "party pods" around the club that are separated by curtains. Inside the pods, guests have two private plasma screens and a fireplace. There are many other events such as stand-up comedy, variety shows, and cooking shows.

== Hotel ==
Odawa Hotel is a recent American Automobile Association three Diamond recipient hotel. There are 137 total rooms (10 Suites and 127 standard guest rooms). There is also multiple conference rooms and a full service food & beverage service in the hotel. The food & beverage service includes room service, a delicatessen, and a full bar. Some service may only be available during peak hours.

== Building ==
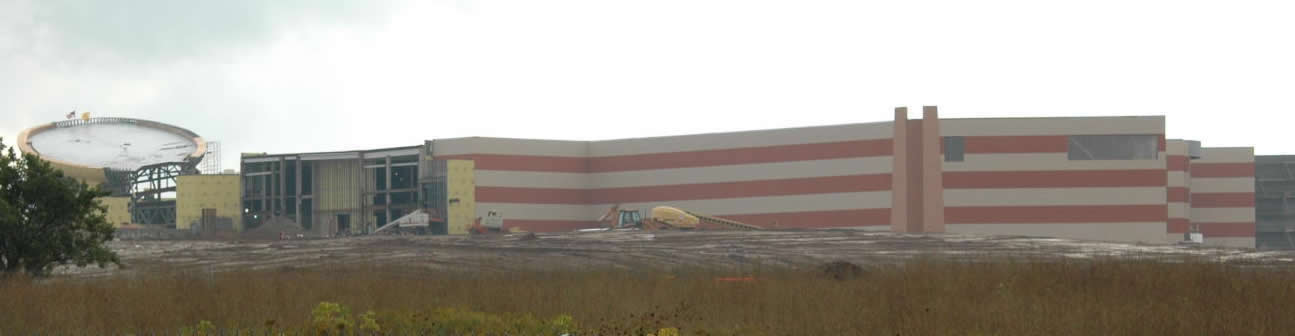
Construction of Odawa Casino Resort in September 2006

Odawa Casino Resort was built in 2006 and 2007 in 15 months. The 300,000 square foot resort was constructed as a joint venture between Shingobee Builders and Clark Construction. The architect was Leo A. Daly Architects. The design features several LEED energy efficiency standards.

== Region ==
Odawa Casino Resort plays a major role in the Petoskey area in terms of income and influence. The Odawa Casino Resort employs roughly 1,000 people and was the 2nd largest employer in the area as of 2008.

== Future expansion ==
Plans are in place to expand the Odawa Casino Resort, yet a firm date has not been set due to economic issues. Possible additions may include a new hotel which would be integrated into the Casino property.
