= Native American Heritage Sites (National Park Service) =

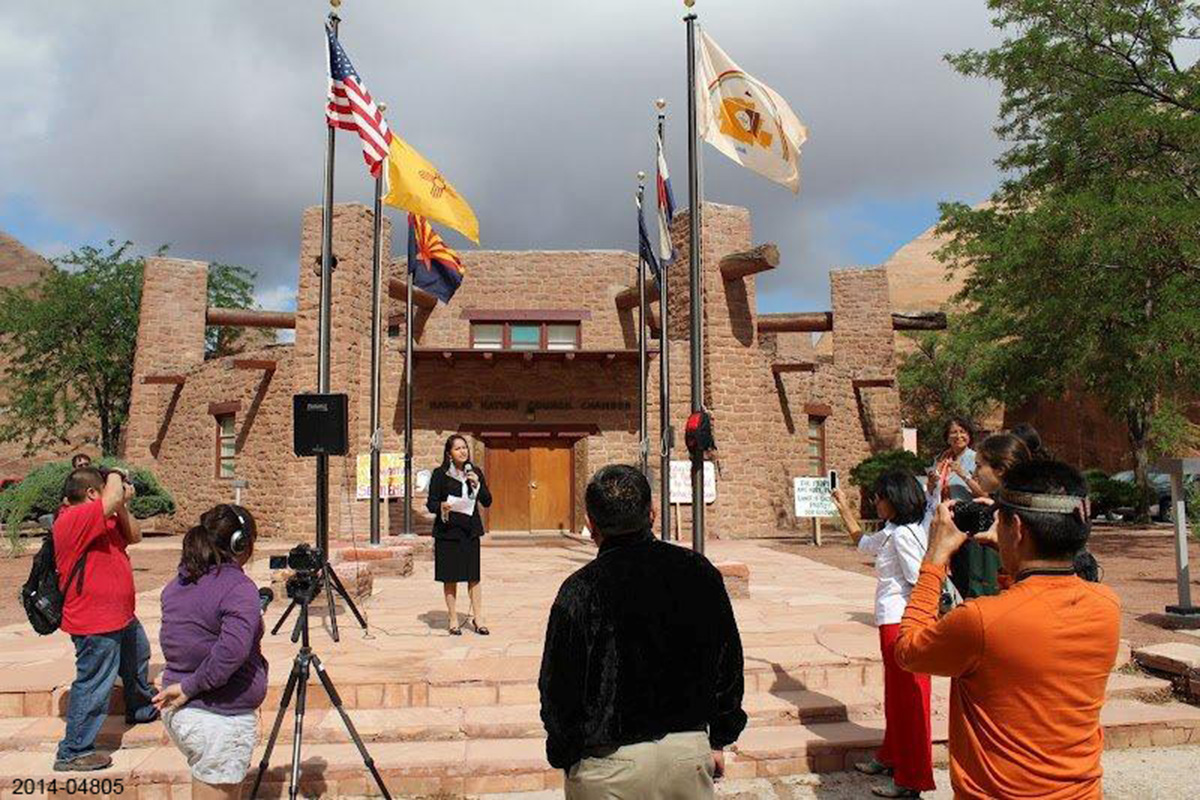
Béésh bąąh dah siʼání (Navajo Nation Council Chamber)

Native American heritage sites are sites specifically created in many National Park Sites in the United States to commemorate the contribution of the Native American cultures. The term ‘Native American’ includes all cultural groups that predate the arrival of either western European or East coast explorers and settlers. In this sense, Native Alaskans of both arctic and sub-arctic cultures are included with the American Indians of the continental United States. Native Hawaiians are included as the traditional cultures of the islands.

Many sites were created specifically to preserve the remains of cultures that no longer exist, such as Mesa Verde National Park or Russell Cave National Monument. Some tell the story of a vibrant culture that continues to contribute to the American culture, as with Canyon de Chelly National Monument. Yet others commemorate American Indian cultures that contributed to the development of an area, as Cape Cod National Seashore, or were a part of greater events in American history, such as Pea Ridge National Military Park. The largest number preserve the historical contributions of the Native Cultures throughout time; included in these are Devils Tower National Monument, Pipestone National Monument, and Kaloko-Honokōhau National Historical Park.

== Parks ==
Park	State	Tribal Affiliation(s)
Agate Fossil Beds National Monument	NE	Lakota
Alibates Flint Quarries National Monument	TX	Pueblo
Arkansas Post National Memorial	AR	Quapaw, Osage, Caddo
Aztec Ruins National Monument	NM	Ancestral Pueblo
Badlands National Park	SD	Lakota
Bandelier National Monument	NM	Ancestral Pueblo
Bent's Old Fort National Historic Site	CO	Southern Cheyenne, Southern Arapaho, Kiowa, Comanche
Big Bend National Park	TX	Jumano, Comanche, Kiowa, Apache
Big Hole National Battlefield	MT	Nez Perce
Bighorn Canyon National Recreation Area	MT & WY	Crow
Big Thicket National Preserve	TX	Alabama-Coushatta, Caddo, Atakapa
Buffalo National River	AR	Paleo-Indians, Archaic, Woodland/Mississippian
Cabrillo National Monument	CA	Kumeyaay
Canaveral National Seashore	FL	Timucuan
Canyon de Chelly National Monument	AZ	Ancestral Pueblo, Navajo
Cape Cod National Seashore	MA	Wampanoag
Capitol Reef National Park	UT	Ancestral Pueblo, Fremont culture
Casa Grande Ruins National Monument	AZ	Hohokam
Castillo de San Marcos National Monument	FL	Seminole
Chaco Culture National Historical Park	NM	Ancestral Pueblo, Pueblo, Navajo
Chiricahua National Monument	AZ	Apache
Colonial National Historical Park (Jamestown),	VA	17th-century Powhatans
Coronado National Memorial	AZ	Zuni
Cuyahoga Valley National Park	OH	Paleo, Archaic, Adena, Hopewell, Whittlessey
Delaware Water Gap National Recreation Area,	PA/NJ	Munsee
De Soto National Memorial,	FL	Timucuan
Devils Tower National Monument,	WY	Northern Plains cultures including: Lakota Sioux, Northern Cheyenne, Kiowa, Crow, Arapaho, Shoshone, among others
Effigy Mounds National Monument	IA	Red Ocher, Hopewell, Effigy Mounds Builders
El Malpais National Monument	NM	Acoma, Laguna, and Zuni Pueblos; Ramah Navajos
El Morro National Monument	NM	Ancestral Pueblo, Navajo, Zuni
Everglades National Park	FL	Seminole
Fort Bowie National Historic Site	AZ	Apache
Fort Caroline National Memorial	FL	Timucuan
Fort Clatsop National Memorial	OR	Clatsop, Chinook
Fort Raleigh National Historic Site	NC	Algonquian
Fort Smith National Historic Site	AR	Cherokee, Muscogee Creek, Seminole, Choctaw, Chickasaw
Fort Stanwix National Monument	NY	Mohawk, Oneida, Onondaga, Cayuga, Seneca, Tuscarora
Fort Sumter National Monument	SC	Seminole at Fort Moultrie
Gates of the Arctic National Park and Preserve	AK	Nunamiut, Kobuk Eskimo, Koyukon Athabascan
Gateway National Recreation Area	NY	Lenape, including Canarsie, Nyak
Glacier National Park	MT	Blackfeet, Salish-Kootenai, Flathead
Glen Canyon National Recreation Area	AZ	Ancestral Pueblo
Golden Gate National Recreation Area	CA	Ohlone (Presidio of San Francisco); Coast Miwok (Marin Headlands)
Grand Canyon National Park	AZ	Ancestral Pueblo/Hopi, Navajo, Zuni, Southern Paiutes, Havasupai, Hualapai
Grand Portage National Monument	MN	Ojibwa
Grand Teton National Park	WY	Plains Indians, Shoshone, Blackfeet
Great Sand Dunes National Monument	CO	Ute
Great Smoky Mountains National Park	TN	Cherokee
Guadalupe Mountains National Park	TX	Mescalero Apache
Haleakala National Park	HI	Ancient Hawaii
Hawaii Volcanoes National Park	HI	Ancient Hawaii
Homestead National Monument of America	NE	Great Plains nations, among others
Kaloko-Honokohau National Historical Park	HI	Ancient Hawaii
Hopewell Culture National Historical Park	OH	Ohio Hopewell
Horseshoe Bend National Military Park	AL	Muscogee Creek, Cherokee
Hovenweep National Monument	CO	Ancestral Pueblo
Hubbell Trading Post National Historic Site	AZ	Navajo
Isle Royale National Park	MI	Ojibwa
Jean Lafitte National Historical Park and Preserve	LA	Choctaw, Chitimacha, Tunica, Houma, Koasati/Coushatta
Gateway Arch National Park	MO	Plains Indian people including Lakota, Osage, and Illini
Katmai National Park and Preserve	AK	Yupik/Aleuts
Knife River Indian Villages National Historic Site	ND	Hidatsa, Mandan, Arikara
Lake Mead National Recreation Area	NV	Virgin River Ancestral Pueblo; Mohave, Hualapai, Southern Paiute
Lake Roosevelt National Recreation Area	WA	Colville Confederated Tribes, Spokane, Nez Perce
Lava Beds National Monument	CA	Modoc
Little Bighorn Battlefield National Monument	MT	Lakota, Cheyenne, Arapaho, Crow, Arikara
Mammoth Cave National Park	KY	Early Woodland prehistoric culture
Mesa Verde National Park	CO	Ancestral Pueblo and 23 affiliated Native American groups
Mojave National Preserve	CA	Paiute, Chemehuevi, Mohave
Montezuma Castle National Monument	AZ	Sinagua
Natchez Trace Parkway	MS/AL/TN	Natchez, Choctaw, Chickasaw, Muscogee Creek, Cherokee
National Capital Parks East, Kenilworth Aquatic Gardens,	DC	Algonquian
Natural Bridges National Monument	UT	Ancestral Pueblo
Navajo National Monument	AZ	Ancestral Pueblo, Navajo
Nez Perce National Historical Park	ID	Nez Perce
North Cascades National Park	WA	Coast Salish/Upper Skagit, Chelan
Ocmulgee National Monument	GA	Mississippian, Lamar phase, Muscogee Creek
Olympic National Park	WA	Elwha Klallam, Hoh, Jamestown S'Klallam, Makah, Port Gamble S'Klallam, Quileute, Quinault, Skokomish
Organ Pipe Cactus National Monument	AZ	Hohokam, O'odham
Pea Ridge National Military Park	AR	Cherokee, Choctaw, Chickasaw
Pecos National Historical Park	NM	Pueblo people
Petroglyph National Monument	NM	Rio Grande Pueblo, Hopi, and Zuni
Pipe Spring National Monument	AZ	Ancestral Pueblo, Southern Paiute, and Navajo
Pipestone National Monument	MN	Siouan groups
Point Reyes National Seashore	CA	Miwok
Puʻukohola Heiau National Historic Site	HI	Ancient Hawaii
Pu'uhonua o Honaunau National Historical Park	HI	Ancient Hawaii
Rainbow Bridge National Monument	AZ	Navajo Nation, Hopi, Kaibab Paiute, San Juan Southern Paiute, Ute Mountain Ute
Redwood National Park	CA	Tolowa, Yurok, Chilula
Roger Williams National Memorial	RI	Narragansett, Wampanoag
Russell Cave National Monument	AL	Transitional Paleo to Mississippian cultural
Salinas Pueblo Missions National Monument	NM	Pueblo
San Antonio Missions National Historical Park	TX	Coahuiltecan/South Texans
San Juan National Historic Site	PR	Taino
Santa Fe National Historic Trail	NM	Historic Plains and Pueblo cultures
Santa Monica Mountains National Recreation Area	CA	Chumash, Tongva
Shiloh National Military Park	TN	at Shiloh Indian Mounds
Sitka National Historical Park	AK	Tlingit
Sunset Crater Volcano National Monument	AZ	Ancestral Pueblo, Navajo
Timucuan Ecological and Historic Preserve	FL	Timucuan
Tonto National Monument	AZ	Salado
Trail of Tears National Historic Trail	NM	Cherokee, Muscogee Creek, Seminole, Choctaw, Chickasaw
Tumacacori National Historical Park	AZ	Pima
Tuzigoot National Monument	AZ	Sinagua
Upper Delaware Scenic and Recreational River	NY	Lenape
Voyageurs National Park	MN	Ojibwa
Walnut Canyon National Monument	AZ	Sinagua, Ancestral Pueblo, Hopi
Whiskeytown-Shasta-Trinity National Recreation Area	CA	Wintu at Whiskeytown
Whitman Mission National Historic Site	WA	Cayuse
Women's Rights National Historical Park	NY	Iroquois Confederacy, Seneca, Cayuga
Wupatki National Monument	AZ	Ancestral Pueblo, Navajo
Yellowstone National Park	WY	Nez Perce, Shoshone-Bannock, Sheepeaters, Crow, Blackfeet
Yosemite National Park	CA	Southern and Central Sierra Miwok, Mono Lake Paiute

NPS units proposed but not confirmed as interpreting Native American culture(s) as a primary theme:

- Apostle Islands National Lakeshore, WI (Ojibwa)
- Arches National Park, UT (Paiute)
- Bering Land Bridge National Preserve, AK (Inupiaq and the St. Lawrence Island Yupik People)
- Canyonlands National Park, UT (Ute)
- Cape Krusenstern National Monument, AK (Inupiaq and the St. Lawrence Island Yupik People)
- Fort Laramie National Historic Site, WY (Cheyenne, Kiowa, Sioux)
- Gila Cliff Dwellings National Monument, NM
- Kobuk Valley National Park, AK (Inupiaq and the St. Lawrence Island Yupik People)
- Poverty Point National Monument, LA (Mississippian culture)

== See also ==
- Federally recognized tribes
- (Federally) unrecognized tribes
- Native Americans in the United States
- List of Alaska Native tribal entities
- List of Indian reservations in the United States
- List of historical Indian reservations in the United States
- Outline of United States federal Indian law and policy
- State recognized tribes in the United States
