= Margaret Bailey Chandler =

American community leader

- Margaret Bailey Chandler, from a family portrait
- Born: Margaret Mary Bailey; May 23, 1929; Muskegon, Michigan
- Died: January 2, 1997; Brethren, Michigan
- Occupation: Community leader

Margaret Mary Bailey Chandler (May 23, 1929 – January 2, 1997) was an American community leader, a member of the Little River Band of Ottawa Indians, based in Michigan. She was posthumously inducted into the Michigan Women's Hall of Fame in 2009.

== Early life ==
Margaret Mary Bailey was born in Muskegon, Michigan, the daughter of Peter Bailey and Elizabeth T. Bailey. Her father worked for the U.S. Forest Service. As a girl, she joined her family in an annual "Indian Village" exhibition at the Manistee Forest Festival.

== Career ==
In 1950, at age 21, Chandler became a secretary of Unit 7 of the Northern Michigan Ottawa Association. Beyond the usual duties of keeping meeting minutes and filing important documents, she worked to establish a legal and genealogical case for sovereignty and fair compensation for the Little River Band of Ottawa Indians. She was seated on the band's tribal council and chaired an education program. In 1994, her goal was achieved, and the Little River Band of Ottawa Indians received federal recognition as a sovereign nation under Senate Bill 1357, and lands were returned to the band in compliance with past treaty provisions.

In the 1980s and 1990s, she was treasurer of the Spirit of the Woods Music Association. She was posthumously inducted into the Michigan Women's Hall of Fame in 2009.

== Personal life ==
Margaret Bailey married Dale Gordon Chandler in 1950. He worked at an asphalt plant. They had nine children together. She died in Brethren, Michigan in 1997, aged 67 years.
