= Ottawa, Ohio =

Village in Ohio, US

- Village
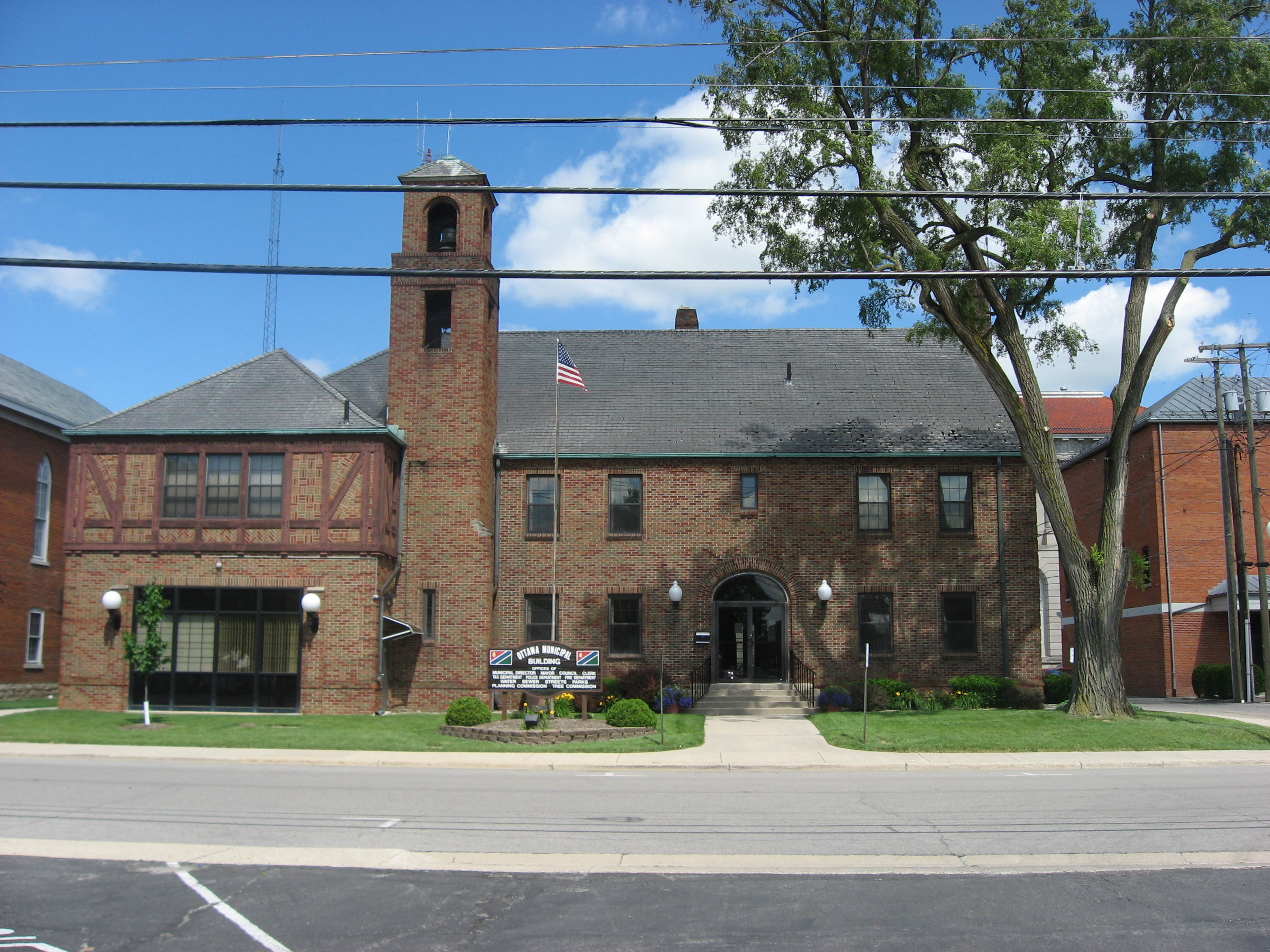
- Ottawa Village Hall
- Interactive map of Ottawa, Ohio
- Location within Ohio Location within the United States
- Coordinates: 41°00′30″N 84°02′15″W
- Country: United States
- State: Ohio
- County: Putnam

Area
  - Total: 4.61 sq mi (11.95 km^{2})
  - Land: 4.55 sq mi (11.78 km^{2})
  - Water: 0.066 sq mi (0.17 km^{2}) 1.47%
- Elevation: 465 ft (141.7 m)

Population (2020)
  - Total: 4,456
  - Density: 979.9/sq mi (378.34/km^{2})
- Time zone: UTC-5 (EST)
  - Summer (DST): UTC-4 (EDT)
- ZIP code: 45875
- Area code: 419
- FIPS code: 39-58982
- GNIS feature ID: 2399596
- Website: http://www.ottawaohio.us

Ottawa is a village in Putnam County, Ohio, United States, and its county seat. It is located about 51 miles (82 km) southwest of Toledo. The population is 4,456 as of the 2020 census.

== History ==
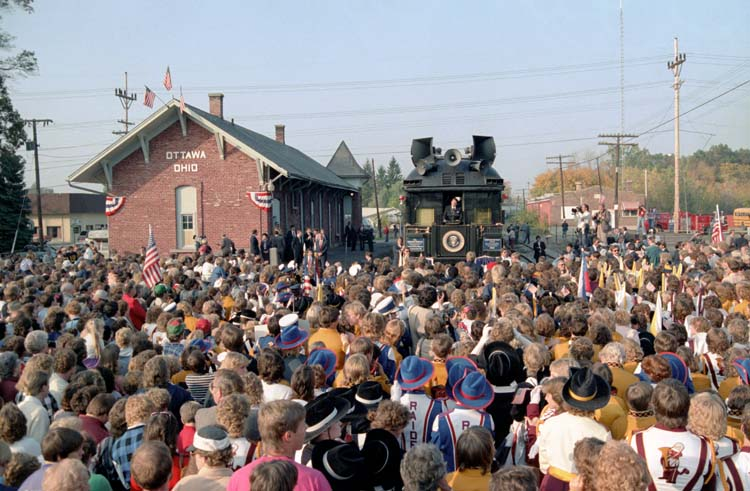
President Ronald Reagan visiting Ottawa on a whistle stop tour in 1984

The region was long inhabited by the Iroquoian-speaking Wyandot and Algonquian-speaking Ottawa tribes, who settled along the Blanchard River. In 1792 President George Washington sent Major Alexander Truman, his servant William Lynch, and guide/interpreter William Smalley on a peace mission to the tribes. Truman and Lynch were killed; the date of their deaths was apparently prior to April 20, 1792, at Lower Tawa Town, an Ottawa village. (The Ottawa County Courthouse stands on the site of their killings). A similar mission led by Colonel John Hardin ended with Hardin and his servant Freeman being killed in Shelby County; the tribes resisted European-American encroachment.

During the War of 1812 between the US and Great Britain, numerous tribes allied with the British in the hope of keeping European Americans out of their territories. Unable to resist the continued pressure, in 1817, the tribes ceded a large tract of land in Northwestern Ohio to the United States. Blanchard's Fork Reserve was established. The tribes ceded this Reserve in 1831, during the era of Indian Removal, and their land claims in the state were extinguished. The Ottawa population on that Reserve removed to Indian Territory in present-day Kansas in 1832. Within the Reserve, two Ottawa villages existed, of which the Lower Tawa Town was the site of what developed as the village of Ottawa, Putnam County, Ohio.

=== European-American settlement ===
Among the early settlers of the Ottawa area was Henry Kohls, who arrived in 1835 and settled with his family in the village of Glandorf. In the early 1900s, his grandsons, Charles and Frank Kohls, were each elected Putnam County treasurer in successive two-year stints. Notably, while serving as treasurer, they each appointed the other as their chief deputy.

Ottawa was incorporated as a village in 1861, during the first year of the American Civil War.

== Geography ==
According to the United States Census Bureau, the village has a total area of 4.77 square miles (12.35 km^{2}), of which 4.70 square miles (12.17 km^{2}) is land and 0.07 square miles (0.18 km^{2}) is water.

== Demographics ==
Historical population
Census	Pop.	Note	%±
1850	104		—
1870	1,129		—
1880	1,293		14.5%
1890	1,717		32.8%
1900	2,322		35.2%
1910	2,182		−6.0%
1920	2,167		−0.7%
1930	2,169		0.1%
1940	2,342		8.0%
1950	2,962		26.5%
1960	3,870		30.7%
1970	3,622		−6.4%
1980	3,874		7.0%
1990	3,999		3.2%
2000	4,367		9.2%
2010	4,460		2.1%
2020	4,456		−0.1%
U.S. Decennial Census

95.3% spoke English, 4.2% Spanish, and 0.5% German as their first language.

=== 2020 census ===
As of the 2020 census, Ottawa had a population of 4,456. The median age was 42.4 years. 23.7% of residents were under the age of 18, and 21.5% were 65 years of age or older. For every 100 females, there were 94.2 males, and for every 100 females age 18 and over, there were 91.7 males age 18 and over.

95.5% of residents lived in urban areas, while 4.5% lived in rural areas.

There were 1,855 households in Ottawa, of which 27.5% had children under the age of 18 living in them. Of all households, 46.6% were married-couple households, 18.7% were households with a male householder and no spouse or partner present, and 28.5% were households with a female householder and no spouse or partner present. About 34.5% of all households were made up of individuals, and 17.2% had someone living alone who was 65 years of age or older.

There were 1,991 housing units, of which 6.8% were vacant. The homeowner vacancy rate was 1.3%, and the rental vacancy rate was 6.8%.

Racial composition as of the 2020 census
Race	Number	Percent
White	3,872	86.9%
Black or African American	50	1.1%
American Indian and Alaska Native	6	0.1%
Asian	23	0.5%
Native Hawaiian and Other Pacific Islander	0	0.0%
Some other race	272	6.1%
Two or more races	233	5.2%
Hispanic or Latino (of any race)	609	13.7%

=== 2010 census ===
As of the census of 2010, there were 4,460 people, 1,829 households, and 1,207 families living in the village. The population density was 948.9 inhabitants per square mile (366.4/km^{2}). There were 1,983 housing units at an average density of 421.9 per square mile (162.9/km^{2}). The racial makeup of the village was 92.5% White, 0.8% African American, 0.4% Native American, 0.3% Asian, 4.8% from other races, and 1.2% from two or more races. Hispanic or Latino of any race were 10.3% of the population.

There were 1,829 households, of which 32.4% had children under the age of 18 living with them, 50.1% were married couples living together, 11.7% had a female householder with no husband present, 4.2% had a male householder with no wife present, and 34.0% were non-families. 30.3% of all households were made up of individuals, and 13.8% had someone living alone who was 65 years of age or older. The average household size was 2.41 and the average family size was 2.98.

The median age in the village was 38.8 years. 26.1% of residents were under the age of 18; 8.2% were between the ages of 18 and 24; 22.8% were from 25 to 44; 27.5% were from 45 to 64; and 15.4% were 65 years of age or older. The gender makeup of the village was 48.5% male and 51.5% female.

=== 2000 census ===
As of the census of 2000, there were 4,367 people, 1,759 households, and 1,157 families living in the village. The population density was 1,126.6 inhabitants per square mile (435.0/km^{2}). There were 1,849 housing units at an average density of 477.0 per square mile (184.2/km^{2}). The racial makeup of the village was 94.34% White, 0.27% African American, 0.09% Native American, 0.44% Asian, 3.73% from other races, and 1.12% from two or more races. Hispanic or Latino of any race were 7.35% of the population.

There were 1,759 households, out of which 32.0% had children under the age of 18 living with them, 51.7% were married couples living together, 10.3% had a female householder with no husband present, and 34.2% were non-families. 30.4% of all households were made up of individuals, and 12.8% had someone living alone who was 65 years of age or older. The average household size was 2.45 and the average family size was 3.08.

In the village, the population was spread out, with 26.8% under the age of 18, 8.0% from 18 to 24, 28.0% from 25 to 44, 22.9% from 45 to 64, and 14.4% who were 65 years of age or older. The median age was 37 years. For every 100 females there were 95.8 males. For every 100 females age 18 and over, there were 90.7 males.

The median income for a household in the village was $39,034, and the median income for a family was $50,810. Males had a median income of $35,174 versus $25,456 for females. The per capita income for the village was $22,476. About 2.8% of families and 5.3% of the population were below the poverty line, including 3.4% of those under age 18 and 9.8% of those age 65 or over.

== Education ==
Ottawa-Glandorf Local Schools operates Ottawa-Glandorf High School in the village.

Ottawa has a public library, a branch of the Putnam County District Library.

== Infrastructure ==
=== Transportation ===
The Putnam County Airport is located three nautical miles (3.5 mi; 5.6 km) northeast of Ottawa's central business district.

== Notable people ==
- Tanner Buchanan, actor
- Larry Cox, baseball player for Chicago Cubs and coach
- Edward Settle Godfrey, United States Brigadier General
- Charles N. Haskell, politician, oilman and first governor of Oklahoma; he practiced law and lived in Ottawa for years after 1880
- Frances Horwich, television performer famous for Ding Dong School; a monument to her was erected in Ottawa in 2006

== Media ==
- WJTA
