= Stephen Kiyoshk =

Canadian murderer and suspected serial killer

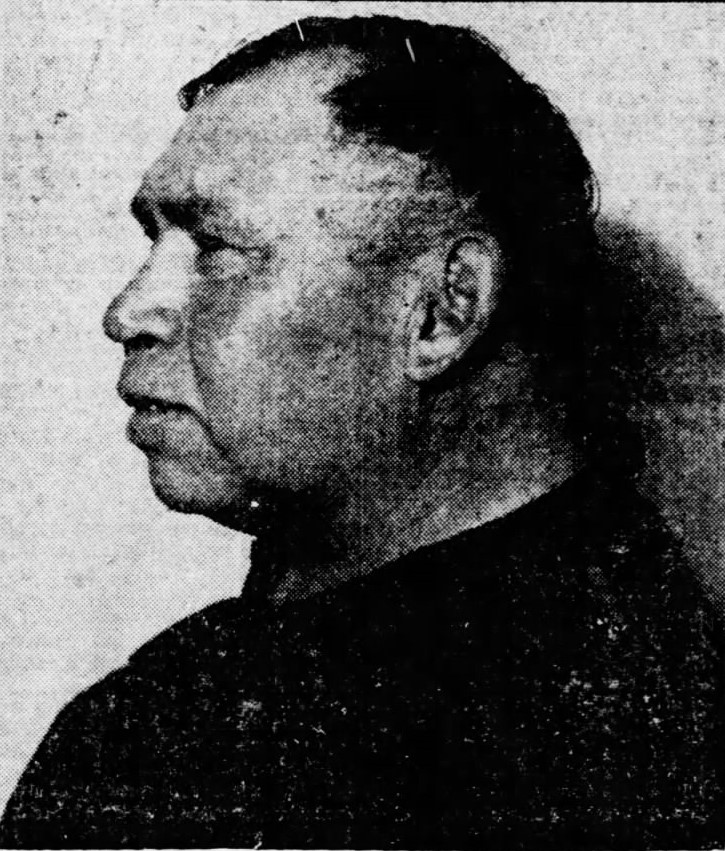
- Born: November 20, 1891; Walpole Island, Ontario, Canada
- Died: January 3, 1941 (aged 49); Lambton County Jail, Ontario, Canada
- Status: Executed by hanging
- Conviction: Murder
- Penalty: Death

Details
- Victims: 1–3
- Span of crimes: 1912–1939
- Country: Canada
- State: Ontario
- Date apprehended: For the last time on August 18, 1939

Stephen Kiyoshk (November 20, 1891 – January 3, 1941) was a Canadian Chippewa Indian murderer and possible serial killer. Originally convicted and sentenced to death for the killings of two men on Walpole Island in 1912, he was later acquitted in a second trial. In 1939, Kiyoshk was arrested for murder and sentenced to death yet again, but this time was successfully executed after his appeals failed.

== Double murder and acquittal ==
On New Year's Day in 1912, Kiyoshk got into an argument with a man named Charles Nahdee, accusing him of courting his love interest, 15-year-old Flossie Williams. After arguing for some time, he eventually stormed out of the man's cabin, threatening to shoot him for what he had done. Later that night, Kiyoshk, Williams and another man, Adam Johns, were paddling with boats on the river and eventually disembarked at the nearest shore. According to witness testimony, the trio came across Nahdee, whereupon Kiyoshk again started arguing with him until he finally walked away, again threatening to shoot him. Johns, who initially contemplated attending a New Year's celebration on another island, decided to stay with Nahdee and Williams at the former's cabin.

Sometime later that night, some neighbors heard multiple shots being fired with some intervals between them, and when they finally stopped, they went to check what had happened. Upon entering the cabin, they found that both Nahdee and Johns had been shot dead, but Williams had been left unharmed. Remembering the earlier threats from Kiyoshk, the matter was immediately reported to the authorities, who swiftly arrested Kiyoshk and charged him with the murders. While he steadfastly maintained his innocence, claiming that he was at home at the time of the murders, he was nonetheless convicted for Johns' murder and sentenced to death, but acquitted in the Nahdee case.

Not long after his conviction, however, several prominent locals including Rev. Walter Rigsby, attorney R. V. LeSueur and interpreter Nicholas Plane began to actively pursue a new trial for Kiyoshk, firmly stating their belief in his innocence. They eventually succeeded in doing so, and in that second trial, they pointed out the anomalous nature of Kiyoshk being convicted for killing Johns but not Nahdee, even though both were thought to have been killed by the same perpetrator. This, coupled with the fact that one of the main witnesses – Williams – also claimed he was innocent, led to Kiyoshk ultimately being acquitted on all counts. Williams was tried for perjury and spent several months in jail for some of her testimony.

A few months later, Kiyoshk and Williams were wed in a Christian ceremony attended by his supporters, in what some newspapers called the "strangest wedding ceremony on Canadian soil." In April 1913, the Attorney General of Ontario, James Joseph Foy, announced that his office would withdraw all charges against Kiyoshk, effectively declaring him innocent of the double murder.

== Murder of Jerry Blackbird ==
On August 17, 1939, the body of 36-year-old Jerry Blackbird was found in a boat washed ashore of the St. Clair River, with his feet having been tied to the back of the boat. He had been bludgeoned to death with an axe, and his body had apparently been transported with a wheelbarrow. While examining his body, police officers found a picture of a woman in his back pocket, which they determined to be Flossie Kiyoshk, the recently deceased wife of Stephen Kiyoshk. When they went to question him about the case, investigators noticed that he had an axe and wheelbarrow that could have been used by the killer, but more concerningly, Kiyoshk had what appeared to be a human bloodstain on his pants. When he failed to provide a convincing alibi, he was arrested and charged with the murder.

Due to the strange nature of the case, considering the fact that Kiyoshk had already been tried twice and sentenced to death once, the case garnered great attention both in Canada and across the border into the United States. Kiyoshk and his defense counsel denied that he was responsible for Blackbird's murder, claiming that he had been asleep after binge-drinking and that the bloodstain was from a nosebleed. In contrast to this, the Crown attorneys claimed that Kiyoshk had murdered Blackbird, who had lived together with him and his wife for some time, in a jealous rage after learning that he had affectionate feelings towards Flossie. In spite of the defense counsel's attempts, Kiyoshk was convicted of murder and sentenced to death.

== Imprisonment, and execution ==
With his execution date set for November 26, 1940, multiple requests for a commutation of Kiyoshk's sentence were submitted to the Supreme Court of Ontario, with few believing that it would work out. To many's surprise, a last-minute reprieve was issued by Justice J. Gerald Kelly for Kiyoshk and his legal team to submit one final appeal, delaying his execution by 38 days.

However, upon reviewing the appeal's contents, the Federal Department of Justice in Ottawa concluded that there was no exculpatory evidence and allowed the execution to proceed. As a result, Kiyoshk was summarily hanged at the Lambton County Jail in Sarnia on January 3, 1941. He had spent his last day playing cards with another inmate, and seemed resigned to his fate. He had no final words, and his last meal consisted of a chicken dinner. At the time, it was the first execution to occur in Sarnia in almost 70 years, as well as the third and final hanging to take place at the Lambton County Jail.

== See also ==
- Capital punishment in Canada
