= Walpole Island First Nation =

Unceded territory in Ontario, Canada

Walpole Island 46 Bkejwanong
- Indian reserve
- Walpole Island Indian Reserve No. 46
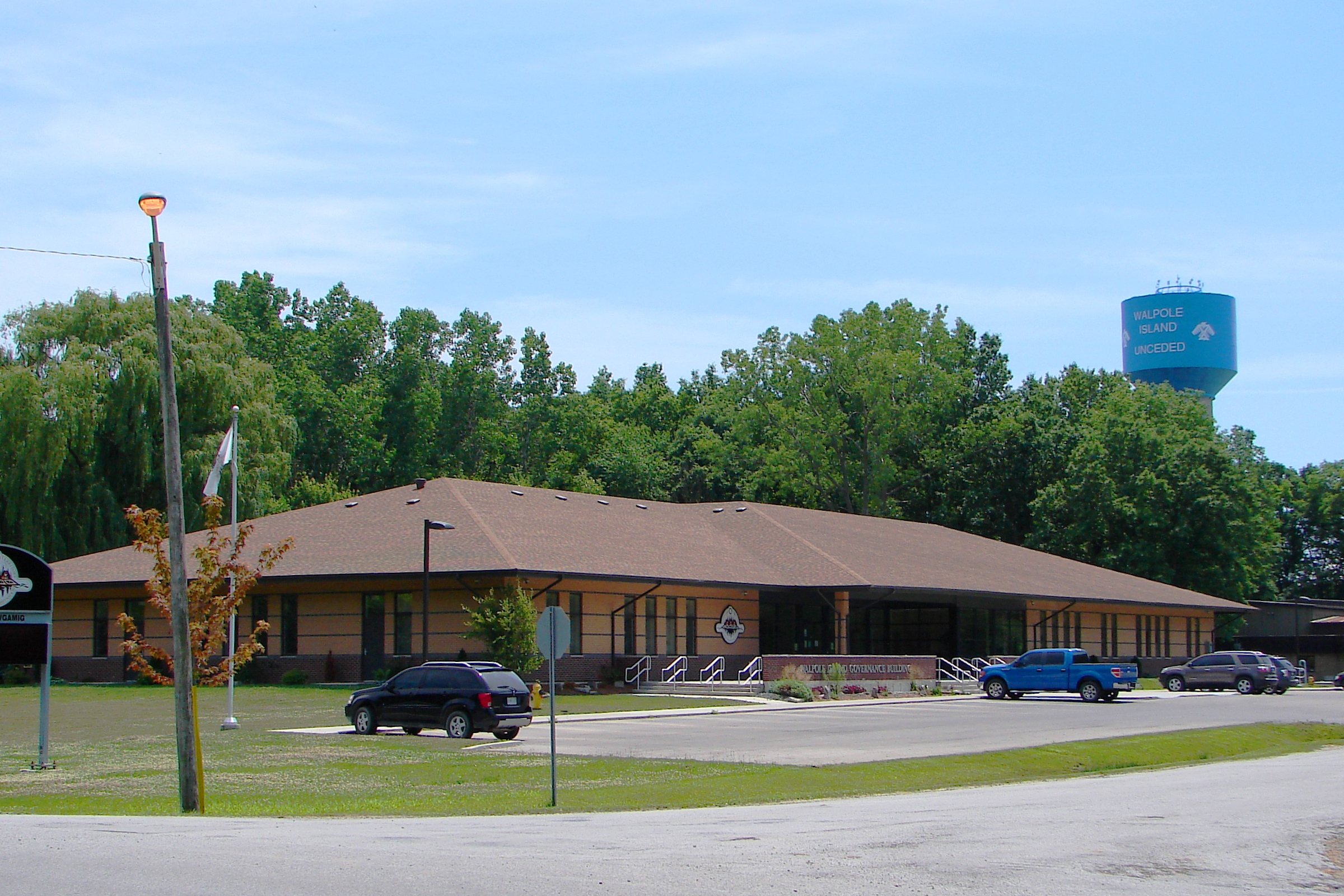
- Governance building

- Location within Southern Ontario
- Coordinates: 42°33′N 82°29′W
- Country: Canada
- Province: Ontario
- County: Lambton
- First Nation: Walpole Island

Government
  - Chief: Leela Thomas
  - Federal riding: Sarnia—Lambton—Bkejwanong
  - Prov. riding: Lambton—Kent—Middlesex

Area
  - Land: 137.47 km^{2} (53.08 sq mi)

Population (2006)
  - Total: 1,878
  - Density: 13.66/km^{2} (35.4/sq mi)
- Time zone: UTC-5 (EST)
  - Summer (DST): UTC-4 (EDT)
- Area codes: 519 and 226

Walpole Island is an island and First Nation reserve in southwestern Ontario, Canada, on the border between Ontario and Michigan in the United States. It is located in the mouth of the Saint Clair River on Lake Saint Clair, about 121 kilometres (75 mi) by road from Windsor, Ontario, and 124 kilometres (77 mi) from Detroit, Michigan.

Walpole Island is given (but disputed) as the resting place of Tecumseh, a 19th-century leader of the Shawnee of much renown for his resistance against American westward expansion by forming Tecumseh's confederacy and starting Tecumseh's War.

== Land area ==
Walpole Island is inhabited by the Ojibwe, Potawatomi, and Odawa peoples of the Walpole Island First Nation, who call it Bkejwanong (pronounced buh-KEZH-wa-nong), meaning "where the waters divide" in Anishinaabemowin. In addition to Walpole Island, the reserve includes Squirrel Island, Saint Anne Island (surrounded by Syme and Johnson Rivers), Seaway Island (except a small US portion), Bassett Island, and Potawatomi Island. The river or creeks that separate these islands provide the area with its other commonly used name, Swejwanong (pronounced SWEZH-wa-nong), meaning "many forks of a river."

It is independent of, but within the geographic region of, Lambton County and adjoins the municipality of Chatham-Kent and the township of Saint Clair. Across the Saint Clair River to the west are the United States towns of Algonac, Michigan, and Clay Township. Harsen's Island, also home to Anishinaabe people, is now on the west side of the international border line. The border was redrawn in the 19th century following disputes between the United Kingdom and the United States; their governments were oblivious to the interests and rights of the Indigenous peoples living on and using these lands. As such, the First Nation is now trying to solve their grievances with the Crown with a specific claim.

== History ==
The name origins of Walpole are uncertain (although possibly related to surveyors Lieutenants Arthur Walpole or John Walpole).

=== Settlement (1600s–1800s) ===
In the late 1600s and early 1700s, what is now known as Walpole Island and the surrounding area was settled by people from the Ojibwe and Odawa nations. In 1844, Jesuits from nearby Sandwich built a mission at the northern point of Walpole Island at the Highbanks. This raised tensions with the Anishinaabeg as the Jesuits were not invited to build on the island and they cut down oak trees that the community did not want to be cut. The relationship between the two groups was further antagonized by the theological debate that Father Pierre Chazelle held with Chief Peterwegeschick and other chief leaders on July 31, 1844. In 1850, the Jesuits left after the mission was razed.

=== Deforestation of the island (1869–1883) ===
Due to a number of contracts for harvesting oak on the island, drawn up by non-Native resource industries, a large amount of Walpole Island was deforested. The nature of these contracts "created a lasting mistrust between the community, Indian Affairs, and non-Native resource industries".

=== Illegal hunting prohibitions (1884–1899) ===
As part of an effort to colonize the island, Indian Affairs produced an illegal prohibition on the hunting of ducks on Saint Anne's Island. The prohibition was lifted once Aboriginal Title was reaffirmed in 1899.

=== 20th-century industrialization of Saint Clair River ===
By the early twentieth century, the river surrounding Walpole Island was heavily trafficked with industrial freight.

=== Present day ===
In February 2021 a University of Windsor male student unrelated to Island members was murdered near Pump House Road, and several males were charged.

== Environment ==
The island is also home to many different environmental efforts, including the Walpole Island Land Trust and the Purple Martin Project run by Richard Carr. Walpole Island has the only self-sustaining population of northern bobwhite (Colinus virginianus) confirmed to exist in Ontario, and by extension, all of Canada.

== Demographics ==
As of January 2011, the registered population of the Walpole Island First Nation is 4,315 members, of whom 2,213 live on the reserve, 22 live on another reserve, and 2,080 live off reserve.

Canada census – Walpole Island 46 community profile

Population
Land area
Population density
Median age
Private dwellings
Median household income

Historical population
Year	Pop.	±%
1991	1,370	—
1996	1,525	+11.3%
2001	1,843	+20.9%
2006	1,878	+1.9%
2011 population unavailable.

== Transportation ==
Walpole Island is connected to mainland Canada by the Tecumseh Road Bridge (Route 32). The Walpole-Algonac Ferry connects with the US city of Algonac, Michigan.

== Education ==
Students completing their Walpole Island Elementary School education will continue it at nearby Wallaceburg District Secondary School. Though those who are Catholic may attend schools in the St. Clair Catholic District School Board.

In the mid-1990s, graduation for First Nations students was about 20%, but by mid-2010s had become closer to 75%.

The Harriett Jacobs Centre within WDSS houses the Walpole Island First Nation Secondary School Program, assisting 150+ students.

== Sports ==
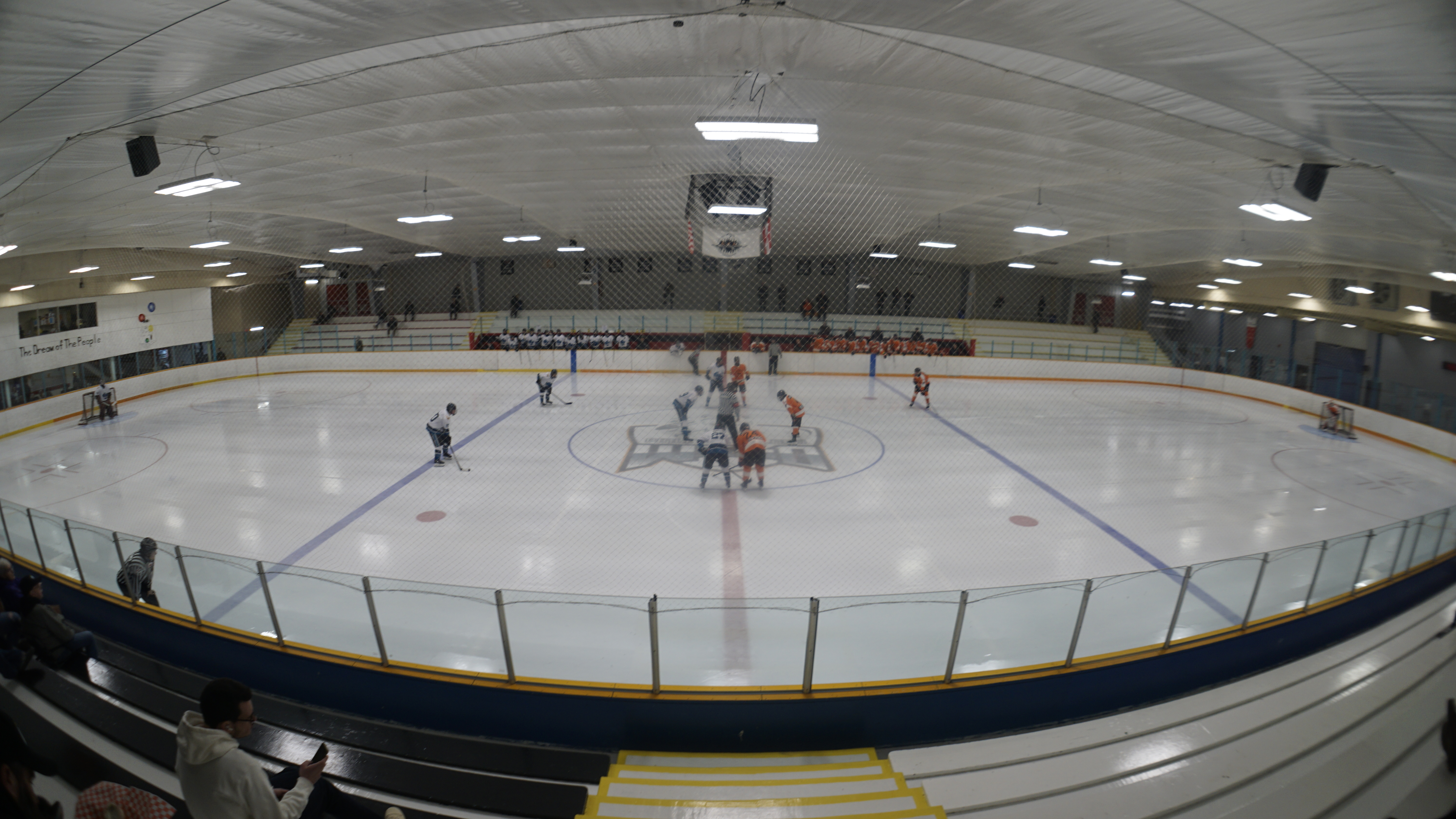
A Walpole Island Wild home game.

The island is home the Walpole Island Wild who play in the Provincial Junior Hockey League.

The Walpole Island First Nation bought the then Wallaceburg Thuderbirds in July 2022. In April 2023, the team's relocation to the Walpole Island Sports Complex was approved. The team was then rebranded as the Walpole Island Wild.

== Notable people ==
- Bauzhi-Geezhig-Waeshikum (d. c. 1842) – Ojibwe chief and medicine man from the Lake Saint Clair area.
- Stephen Kiyoshk (1891–1941) – murderer executed for killing a fellow tribesman in 1939. Notable for being the only person in Canadian history to be sentenced to death twice for different crimes.
- Sacramento Knoxx – multidisciplinary artist (including hip hop), director, and activist.
- Alexander McKee (1735–1799) – British Indian Department agent who founded the Walpole Island settlement.
- Tecumseh (c. 1768 – 1813) – 19th-century chief and warrior. His remains are claimed to have been buried on Saint Anne Island, and reburied at Walpole Island in 1941.
- Eva Thomas – filmmaker and screenwriter

== Gallery ==
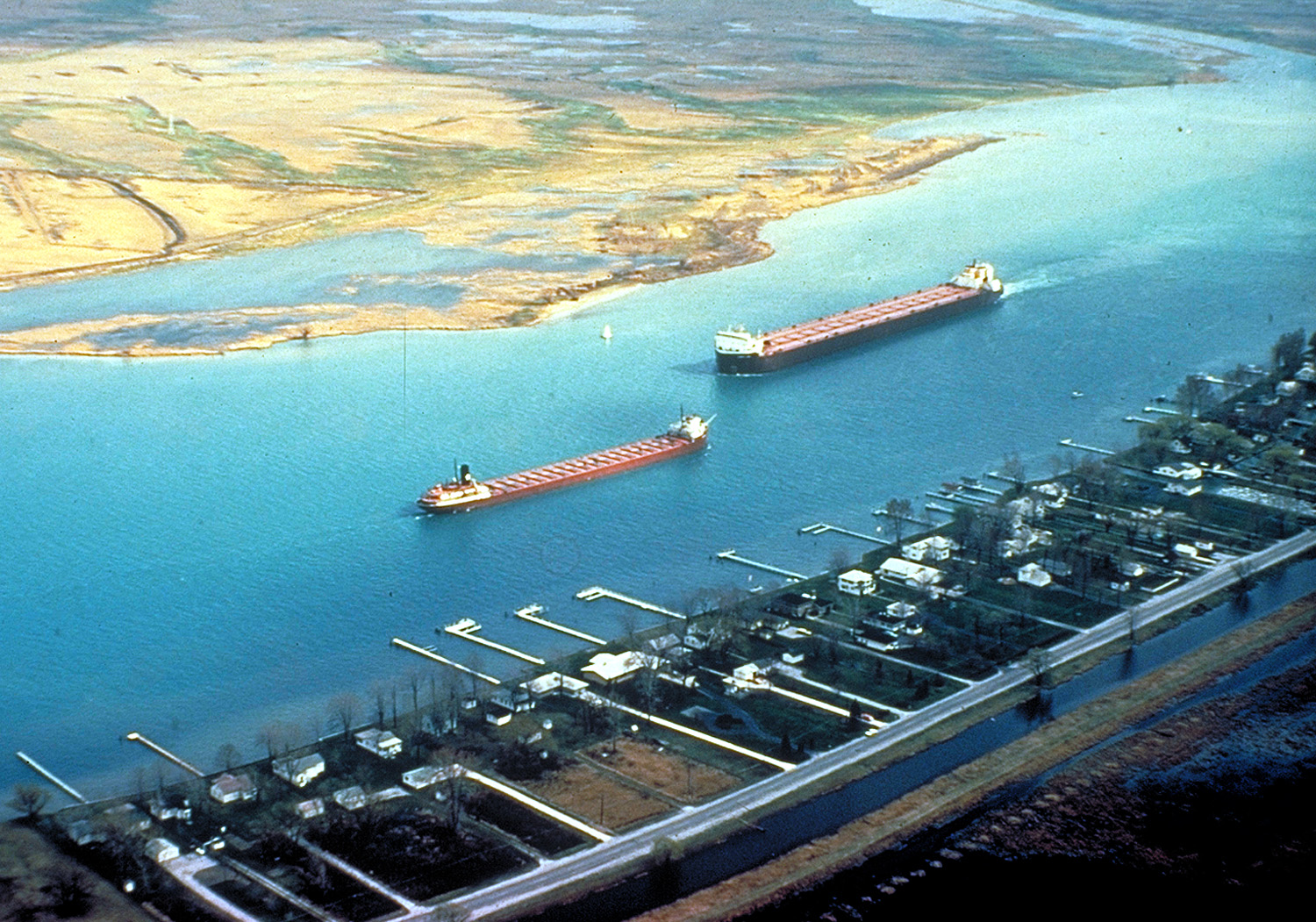
Saint Clair River with Walpole Island in the background

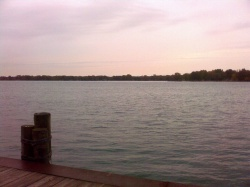
View of Walpole Island as seen from across the Saint Clair River

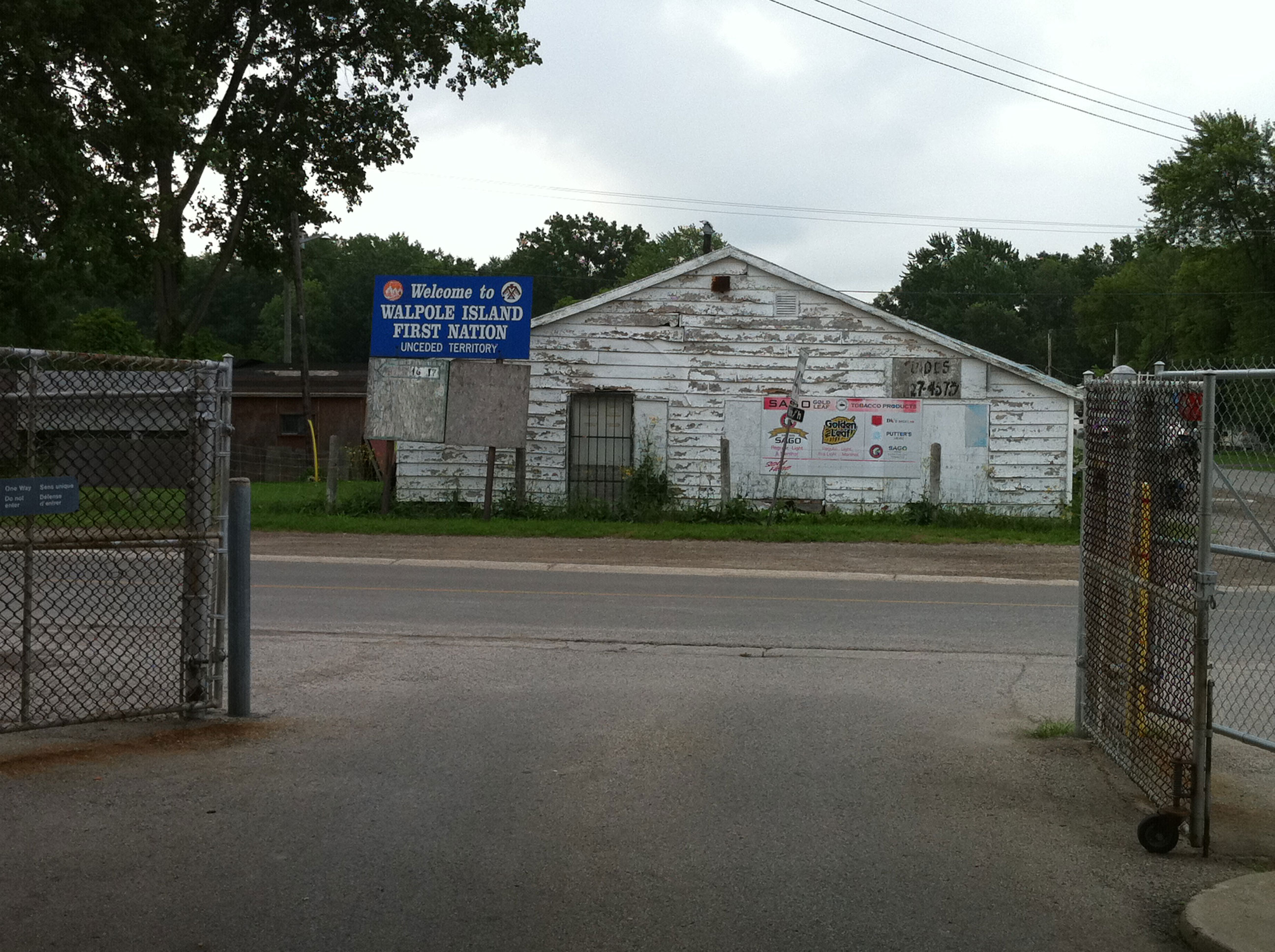
Entry to Walpole Island from ferry to Algonac

== See also ==
- List of Jesuit sites
- Walpole–Algonac Ferry
