= Nawash-Kinjoano Reservation =

Former reservation in Ohio, United States

Coordinates: 41°25′11″N 83°44′24″W

The Nawash-Kinjoano Reservation was an Ottawa reservation located along the Maumee River in Northwestern Ohio until slightly after 1830.

The reservation consisted of the villages of Nawash and Kinjoano (or Kinjoino's Town) on the north side of the Maumee. Nawash's Town, established around 1819, was named after its chief, Nawash, a Saugeen Ojibwe war chief who fought beside Tecumseh in the War of 1812.

There was also a village of Tontongany on the south side of the Maumee, located about 2.8 miles north of today's town of Tontogany. This village was not part of the reservation but was inhabited by Ottawas as well.

The reservation essentially stretched from just west of Waterville, Ohio to slightly east of Prairie Damascus, Ohio.

The reservation was established in 1807 and dissolved in 1831.
