= Little Traverse Bay Bands of Odawa Indians =

- 1800s Odawa family, Little Traverse Bay Bands

Total population
- 4,000+

Regions with significant populations
- Charlevoix and Emmet counties, Michigan, United States

Languages
- Ojibwe (Ottawa dialect), English

Related ethnic groups
- Ottawa, Ojibwe, Potawatomi and other Algonquian peoples

The Little Traverse Bay Bands of Odawa Indians (LTBBOI, Ojibwe: Waganakising Odawa) is a federally recognized Native American tribe of Odawa. A large percentage of the more than 4,000 tribal members continue to reside within the tribe's traditional homelands on the northwestern shores of the state of Michigan's Lower Peninsula. The historically delineated reservation area, located at , encompasses approximately 336 square miles (870 km^{2}) of land in Charlevoix and Emmet counties. The largest communities within the reservation boundaries are Harbor Springs (formerly known as L'Arbre Croche in the French colonial era), where the tribal offices are located; Petoskey, where the Tribe operates the Odawa Casino Resort; and Charlevoix.

This is one of three federally recognized tribes of Odawa people in Michigan, who total more than 9,000 people, and the only one named Odawa. The others are the Grand Traverse Band of Ottawa and Chippewa Indians and the Little River Band of Ottawa Indians. Other bands with federal status include the Ottawa Tribe of Oklahoma and several First Nations in Ontario, Canada.

== History ==
The name Odawa, or Ottawa, is said to derive from the Anishnaabe term for "trader." On one European record, it was mistakenly associated with an Odawa phrase meaning "people of the bulrush," which applied to only one band along the Ottawa River.

Little Traverse Bay Bands of Odawa tribal members are descendants of, and legally recognized political successors to, the Ottawa of L'Arbre Croche, who were signatory parties to the 1836 Treaty of Washington and one of the three 1855 Treaties of Detroit. The treaties ratified the Odawa cession to the United States of approximately 37% of Michigan's current land area in exchange for money, reservations, and other benefits.

But the 1855 treaty allocated 80-acre plots of land to individual tribal households, dissolving the tribal governments. It created an artificial group known as the Ottawa and Chippewa Nation, including some Chippewa (Ojibwe) peoples, which was allotted some reserves. Many of the annuities and supplies promised to the Nation by the federal government under this treaty were never delivered. (The Little Traverse Bay tribe has found the annuity rolls, dating from 1836 to 1871, useful as a source for documenting direct-line descent from tribal members, for persons seeking to qualify as member/citizen.)

"In 1905 the Michigan Ottawa successfully sued the United States in the Court of Claims for redress for fraud and treaty violations." But the bands across Michigan continued to try to recover their tribal status. In the 20th century, the tribes organized, working to respond to the President Franklin D. Roosevelt's Indian New Deal - the Indian Reorganization Act of 1934, which encouraged Native Americans to reorganize their tribal governments. But the Michigan Ottawa were prohibited from organizing under this act.

In Michigan, three main groups organizing through the 1930s and 1940s were the Michigan Indian Defense Association (1933), the Michigan Indian Foundation (1941), and the Northern Michigan Ottawa Association (NMOA) (1948). The Little Traverse Bay Bands of Odawa was known as the NMOA, Unit 1, as there were other bands represented in this group. NMOA, Unit 1 filed a civil suit to gain protected fishing rights under its 19th-century treaty, arguing that it had not given up fishing rights when ceding control over its lands. The federal courts refused to recognize NMOA Unit 1 as a tribe because they were an organization.

Heartened by the success of the Grand Traverse Band of Ottawa and Chippewa Indians in gaining federal recognition in 1980, the Little Traverse bands reorganized again. Their members passed a constitution and set up a government, taking the name 'Little Traverse Bay Bands of Odawa Indians.' A federal court still denied the tribe treaty fishing rights, saying that it was not federally recognized so had no status under the treaties.

Given its well-documented treaty relations of its historic bands with the federal government, the Little Traverse Bay tribe began to pursue legislative reaffirmation of its tribal status. On September 21, 1994, President Bill Clinton signed into law Senate Bill 1357, which reaffirmed the United States' political relationship with the Little Traverse Bay Bands of Odawa Indians (and with the Little River Band of Ottawa Indians, which was also recognized).

The tribe is made up of descendants of nine bands of Odawak who traditionally lived in this area: 1) North Shore (Naubinway west to Escanaba); 2) the Beaver Islands; 3) Cross Village; 4) Burt Lake; 5) Good Heart (Middle Village); 6) Harbor Springs; 7) Petoskey; 8) Bay Shore; and 9) Charlevoix.

Location of the Little Traverse Bay Indian Reservation in Michigan

Most tribal members continue to live in the area of their traditional homeland. The historically delineated reservation area, located at , encompasses approximately 336 square miles (870 km^{2}) of land in Charlevoix and Emmet counties. The largest communities within the reservation boundaries are Harbor Springs, where the tribal offices are located; Petoskey, where the Tribe owns and operates the Odawa Casino Resort; and Charlevoix.

== Language ==
While Odawa, a dialect of the Ojibwe language, is the first language of some tribal members, the majority primarily speak English. As part of language revitalization efforts, the Tribe "promotes the preservation and revitalization of Anishinaabe language and Anishinaabe culture" through a variety of ways, including summer language camps, language classes offered at North Central Michigan College in Petoskey, and community language classes. The Gijigowi Anishinaabemowin Language Department assists with language education from its headquarters in Harbor Springs.

== Tribal government ==
As part of seeking federal recognition, the tribe adopted a constitution establishing elected, representative government. It elected seven members to a Tribal Council, which had all authority for governance, including establishing rules for membership.

Prior to 2005, all governmental authority was vested in a seven-member Tribal Council. In 2005, the LTBBOI amended its tribal constitution to adopt a separation of powers model. It established three branches: legislative, executive, and judicial branches. Under this system, the Tribal Council exercises the legislative powers; the Chairman, Vice Chairman and appointed Boards exercise the executive powers; and a tribal court system exercises the judicial powers.

- Tribal Chairman: Winnay Wemigwase
- Vice Chairman: Eva Oldman

Prompted by a request from two tribal citizens, in 2012 the Council began consideration of a constitutional amendment regarding marriage, to replace "one man and one woman" with language including gay and lesbian couples. On March 3, 2013, the Tribal Council voted 5 to 4 in favor of the measure, sending it to Chairman Dexter McNamara for signature or veto. At the time, only two other federally recognized tribes, the Coquille Tribe and the Suquamish Tribe, officially acknowledged the marriages of gay and lesbian couples.

== Citizenship ==
The tribe determines citizenship. It is primarily based on an individual having at least 1/4 North American Indian ancestry and direct descent from an individual listed on the Durant Roll (1907-1910) or the Annuity Rolls of Ottawa and Chippewa of Michigan, from 1836 to 1871, and referenced by the 1850 through 1920 censuses as residing within the boundaries of the reservation. In recognition that the Odawa and other Indigenous peoples have had their own territories that are now divided by the border of the United States and Canada, they require that citizens have at least 1/4 North American Indian ancestry, in addition to direct descent from individuals listed on the tribal records described above. They do not accept persons who are enrolled in other tribes. Various other qualifications are noted in the Tribal Code describing these rules. The tribe makes special allowances to encourage the awarding of citizenship to Native Americans who were adopted out as children to non-Native families, in order to embrace them within the tribe and restore them to Native American citizenship.

== Little Traverse Bay Bands of Odawa Indians v. Whitmer ==
In August 2015, the tribe filed a lawsuit against the State of Michigan alleging that the state has not fulfilled its side of an 1855 agreement with the tribe. At issue was whether the agreement created a "reservation" in the northwest corner of the lower peninsula of Michigan, and if it did create a reservation whether the U.S. Congress has ever changed that status. The lawsuit was joined by many co-defendants, including the cities of Charlevoix, Petoskey, and Harbor Springs; Emmet and Charlevoix counties; several townships; and two nonprofit groups of local property owners.

In August 2019, United States District Court, W.D. Michigan, Southern Division granted summary judgement to the defendants stating that "...after a review of the entirety of the historical record, summary judgment is warranted on the Tribe’s claims because the 1855 treaty cannot plausibly be read to create an Indian reservation..."

The tribe appealed before the U.S. 6th Circuit Court of Appeals. The 6th Circuit ruled against the tribe in May 2021, finding that "... the Treaty of 1855 did not create a system of federal superintendence sufficient to establish an Indian reservation for the Band."
