= Sacramento Knoxx =

American artist and musician

- Born: Christopher Yepez; Detroit, Michigan, U.S.
- Citizenship: Anishinaabe Chicano
- Occupations: Rapper; activist
- Musical career
- Genres: Hip hop
- Instrument: Vocals

Sacramento Knoxx, born Christopher Yepez, is an American Ojibwe/Chicano artist, musician, and activist, from Southwest Detroit. His music mixes elements of electronic music, ghettotech, afro-latino, hip hop, soul, and R&B.

== Early life ==
Knoxx was born in Detroit, Michigan, but his upbringing was heavily influenced by his family's connection to the Walpole Island Reserve in Canada. His father and paternal relatives reside there, and Knoxx spent a significant part of his childhood on the reserve.

From a young age, Knoxx displayed an interest in music, dance, and the visual arts. He often experimented with various mediums inspired by the physical formats of the time, such as VHS tapes and Polaroid photos.

== Education ==
Knoxx graduated from Western International High School in Southwest Detroit. Following his high school education, Knoxx studied at Michigan State University, where he earned a Bachelor of Science degree in Telecommunications & Digital Media Art from the College of Arts & Sciences in the spring of 2010.

Knoxx obtained a Certificate of Media Based Organizing in the fall of 2010 from Detroit Future Media (Allied Media) in Detroit, Michigan. In the summer of 2014, he earned a Certificate of Movement Building and Education from the SOUL School of Unity & Liberation in Oakland, California.

== Career ==
Knoxx's career spans music production, film, visual art, and social activism.

In 2015, he won one of two Gilda Awards through Kresge Arts in Detroit.

In 2020, Knoxx was a Education and Community Engagement Research Residency Artist for the University Musical Society at the University of Michigan.
