= Ottawa Tribe of Oklahoma =

Native American tribe in Oklahoma

Adawe (Ottawa)

Total population
- 2,500

Regions with significant populations
- United States (Oklahoma)

Languages
- Ojibwe (Ottawa dialect), English

Religion
- Christianity, traditional tribal religion

Related ethnic groups
- other Odawa tribes, Potawatomi, and Ojibwe

The Ottawa Tribe of Oklahoma (Ottawa: Adawe) is one of four federally recognized Native American tribes of Odawa people in the United States. Their Algonquian-speaking ancestors had migrated gradually from the Atlantic coast and Great Lakes areas, reaching what are now the states of Michigan and Ohio in the 18th century. In the late 1830s, the United States removed the Ottawa to west of the Mississippi River, first to Iowa, then to Kansas in what was Indian Territory.

Following the United States Civil War, in 1867, the Ottawa sold their land in Kansas to move again and purchase land in another section of Indian Territory, which would later become northeast Oklahoma. They were authorized by Congress to buy land from the Quapaw, the predominant tribe in this area.

The other three Odawa tribes are located in the state of Michigan, in what was part of the traditional Odawa territory. They are the Grand Traverse Band of Ottawa and Chippewa Indians, Little River Band of Ottawa Indians, and the Little Traverse Bay Bands of Odawa Indians. In addition, there are First Nations of Odawa people in Ontario, Canada, including on Manitoulin Island, their original homeland.

== Government ==
Map of Ottawa Tribe of Oklahoma's tribal jurisdictional area (OTSA) and nearby jurisdiction areas.

The headquarters of the Ottawa Tribe of Oklahoma is located in Miami. Their tribal jurisdictional area is in Ottawa County. As of 2026, the Tribe has approximately 4,000 enrolled members, with around 700 residing in Oklahoma. Membership qualifications are based on direct lineal descent, and there is no minimum blood quantum requirement.

As of 2026, the current administration is:

- Chief: Cody Hollenbeck (Term: 2026-2029)
- Second Chief: Mikal Scott-Werner (Term: 2025-2028)
- Secretary/Treasurer: Dennis Scott (Term: 2024-2027)
- First Councilman: Kyle Britt (Term: 2024-2027)
- Second Councilman: Kerri Angelo (Term: 2025-2028)

The Ottawa Tribe is working to modernize its constitution.

== Economic development ==
The Ottawa Tribe issues its own tribal vehicle tags. They operate two tribal smoke shops, two gas stations, the Otter Stop Convenience Store, and the Adawe Travel Plaza. In addition, they operate the High Winds Casino. In 2021 the tribe opened its first restaurant, the Otter Cove Diner. Their annual economic impact is estimated by the Oklahoma Indian Affairs Commissions to be $3 million.

== Cultural, language, and programs ==
The tribe operates a Community Health Program and the Healthy Living Center in Miami, as well as a Department of Environmental Protection. The tribe publishes the Adawe News for its tribal members. It offers Ottawa language classes.

The Ottawa Tribe of Oklahoma's annual powwow is held every Labor Day weekend.

== History ==
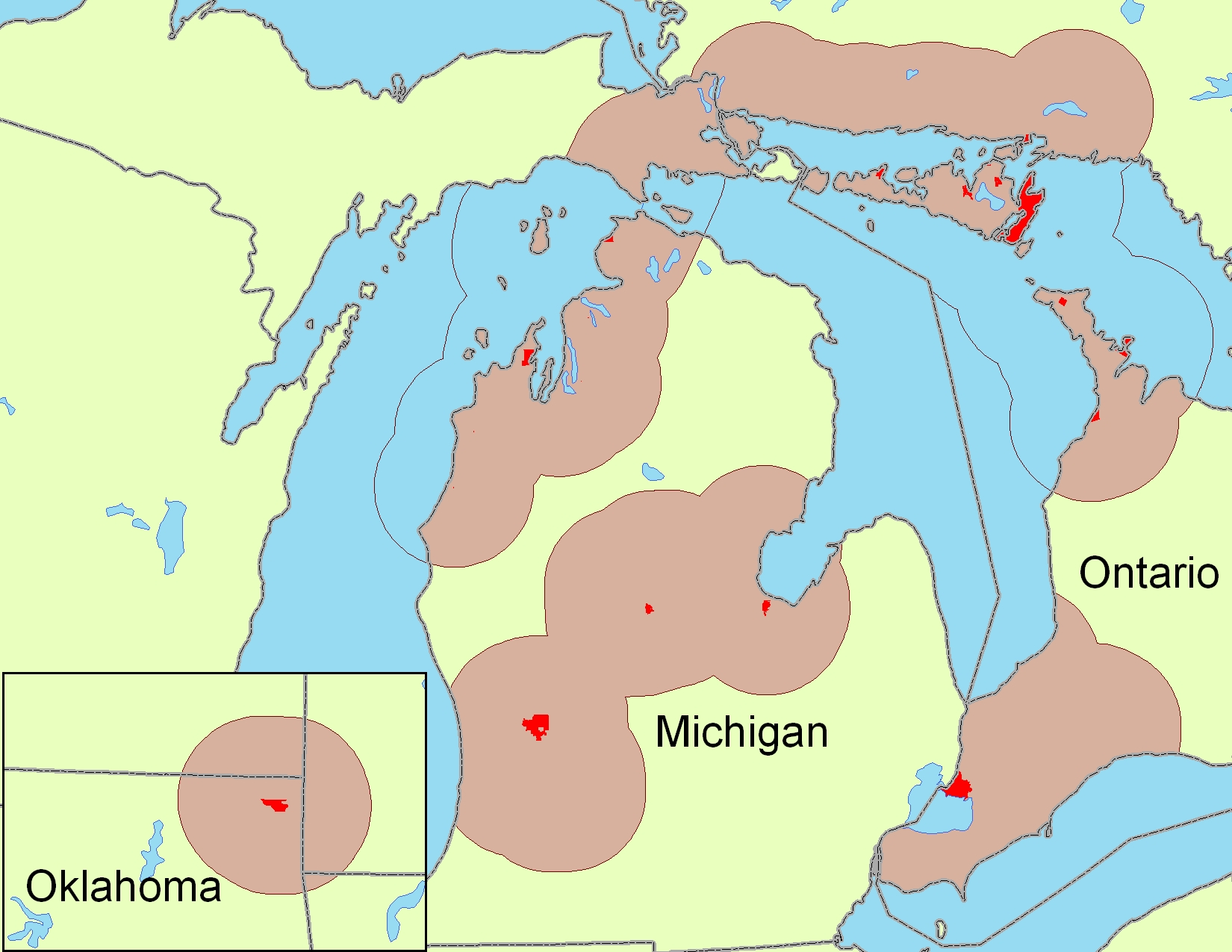
Ottawa homelands

"Ottawa" or "Odaawaa" comes from the word Adaawe, which means "to trade". Long before European explorations began, the Odawa were known among other Native American tribes as important traders. The French quickly realized how influential they were and used them as middlemen to the tribes to the north and west of them, who supplied them with furs from the 17th well into the 18th century.

The Odawa are part of the Three Fires Confederacy, together with the Ojibwe and Potawatomi. The Oklahoma Odawa are descended from Odawa bands that moved south from Manitoulin Island and the Bruce Peninsula, both in Ontario, Canada, under pressure from the Iroquois and other tribes, and European encroachment. They settled near Fort Detroit and the Maumee River in Ohio.

They were pressured to move again by the United States, after Congressional passage of the Indian Removal Act of 1830, which authorized the government to make land exchanges with Native American tribes in order to remove them from east of the Mississippi River and extinguish their land titles there. The Ottawa of the Blanchard's Fork, Roche de Bœuf and Auglaize reserves of Ohio signed a treaty with the US in 1833. The treaty ceded their lands in Michigan, Ohio, and Illinois in exchange for lands in Iowa, then Kansas, part of what was known as Indian Territory under the federal government's plan.

The Odawa did not relocate from Ohio until April 1837. Of the 600 Odawa who migrated to Kansas, "more than 300 died within the first two years, because of exposure, lack of proper food, and the great difference between the cool, damp woods of Ohio and the dry, hot plains of Kansas."

To survive as a people, the tribe made a remarkable investment in their children's future. Of the 74,000 acres (300 km^{2}) the Ottawa controlled in Kansas, they set aside 65 acres (260,000 m^{2}) for an upper-level school and sold 20,000 acres (81 km^{2}) of land to fund its construction and maintenance. Affiliated with the Baptist Church, which operated missions in Kansas, Ottawa University educated both Indians and non-Indians. The university still offers free tuition today to any enrolled member of the Ottawa tribe.

The present-day town of Ottawa, Kansas, developed because of the Odawa Reservation. The Odawa people remained in Kansas until 1867, after the American Civil War. Under the leadership of Chief John Wilson, the tribe sold their lands in Kansas and purchased 14,863 acres (60 km^{2}) of land in Indian Territory from the Eastern Shawnee. More of the tribe died during relocation and only 200 Odawa arrived in their new lands.

Two decades later, Congress passed the Dawes Act of 1887, designed to encourage Native American assimilation by having households establish subsistence farming in the European-American model. It dissolved the communal tribal lands and governments, and required communal lands to be divided and allocated in 160-acre plots to individual households of registered members of each tribe in the Indian Territory. The land was so poor in many areas that this amount of farmland proved insufficient even for subsistence farming. In 1891, 157 Odawa were finally allotted plots of land in Indian Territory; under provisions of the law, the US federal government declared the remainder of their land as surplus and sold it, primarily to non-native buyers. The Dawes Rolls are records for each tribe of their members registered at that time. A number of tribes have used the Dawes Rolls as a basis for establishing membership among descendants in their tribes at a particular time.

In 1936, the Ottawa tribe in Oklahoma organized their government again under the Oklahoma Indian Welfare Act and regained federal recognition as a tribe. This entitled them to certain benefits in education, for instance.

But in the 1950s federal policy changed again, and Congress decided it was time to encourage tribes to give up their special status in relation to the federal government. Congress and the Bureau of Indian Affairs determined that some tribes were ready to be 'terminated'; that is, their special status would end and their citizens would be considered simply US citizens. The Ottawa of Oklahoma were one of the tribes whose federally recognized government was terminated in 1956. This deprived them of benefits needed in the harsh environment of Oklahoma, and disrupted their society.

The tribe persevered to regain their status; federal recognition was restored under a bill signed by President Jimmy Carter on May 15, 1978. In 1979, the US Congress recognized the tribal council and ratified the tribal constitution.

Since that time, three other bands have gained federal recognition as tribes. In 1980 the Grand Traverse Band of Ottawa and Chippewa Indians gained federal recognition. In 1994 two more tribes of Odawa people in Michigan gained federal recognition: the Little River Band of Ottawa Indians and the Little Traverse Bay Bands of Odawa Indians. There are also status bands of First Nations of Odawa peoples on Manitoulin Island and in other areas of Ontario, Canada.

The Ottawa Tribe of Oklahoma serves free lunches for elders in the town of Miami.

== Notable citizens ==
- Charles A. Todd, Red Cedar (1935–2014), former chief, U.S. Army veteran
