= Putnam County Airport (Ohio) =

Public use airport in Ottawa, Ohio

- IATA: none; ICAO: none; FAA LID: OWX

Summary
- Airport type: Public
- Owner: Putnam County Airport Authority
- Serves: Ottawa, Ohio
- Time zone: UTC−05:00 (-5)
  - Summer (DST): UTC−04:00 (-4)
- Elevation AMSL: 763 ft (233 m)
- Coordinates: 41°02′08″N 083°58′54″W

Map
- Location of airport in Ohio OWX (the United States)

Runways
Direction	Length		Surface
Direction	ft	m	Surface
9/27	4,502	1,372	Asphalt

Statistics (2021)
- Aircraft Operations: 12,990
- Based aircraft: 19
- Sources: Federal Aviation Administration, AirNav, SkyVector

Putnam County Airport (FAA LID: OWX) (Note: The airport formerly used the FAA location identifier OH25.) is a public use airport located 3 nautical miles northeast of Ottawa, Ohio.

== History ==
Suggestions to build an airport in Putnam County occurred as early as July 1965, when Governor Jim Rhodes promoted the idea at the county fair. By September 1966, the county received a state grant to build an airport on 412 acres (167 ha) adjacent to the county home. A contract for the construction of a 3,800-foot (1,200 m) runway was awarded a month later. The airport was dedicated on 1 October 1967. By early July 1968, an administration building was being assembled and bids were being accepted for a hangar. The hangar was planned to be dedicated in September 1969. The airport received another state grant in March 1970 that it planned to use to build taxiways and an administration building.

The airport manager, Robert Ruhe, installed gasoline tanks at his hangar after April 1973. The airport authority then sued, attempting to evict him from the airport. Ruhe countersued and, in April 1975, a judge ruled that the county could not hire a new fixed-base operator or force him to leave the airport. A settlement was reached in December of the following year, where Ruhe was allowed to use his hangar, but agreed to cease operating the airport.

In October 1987, the county commissioners approved a contract to relocate a nearby road to allow the extension of the runway. The next month a contract was awarded to extend the runway.

A new fixed-base operator began managing the airport in April 1993 after the previous manager, who did not operate such a service, resigned.

Plans for a new clear-span hangar on a 15,000 sq ft (1,400 m^{2}) lot were announced in January 2005. A new 2,250 sq ft (209 m^{2}) terminal building, donated by a local resident, was completed in March 2006. A new flagpole was installed at the airport as part of an Eagle Scout project in May 2012. The runway was extended again, to 4,500 feet (1,400 m), that November.

== Facilities and aircraft ==
=== Facilities ===
Putnam County Airport has one runway, designated 9/27 with an asphalt surface measuring 4,502 by 75 feet (1,372 x 23 m).

The airport has a fixed-base operator that offers limited services. Parking includes hangars and tie-downs for visiting aircraft. Fuel service offers 100LL and Jet-A.

=== Aircraft ===
Based on the 12-month period ending 14 September 2021, the airport had 12,990 aircraft operations, an average of 36 per day. This includes >99% general aviation, and <1% air taxi.

For the same time period, 19 aircraft are based on the field: 16 single-engine airplanes, 2 multi-engine airplanes, and 1 glider.

== Accidents and incidents ==
- On 7 October 1990, a single engine airplane crashed while on approach to the airport, killing the pilot and three passengers.

== See also ==
- List of airports in Ohio
