= Bauzhi-Geezhig-Waeshikum =

Bauzhi-Geezhig-Waeshikum (from Ojibwe Baazhi-giizhigweshkam, "one who steps over the sky"; also recorded as Pazhekezhikquashkum, Pechegechequistqum, etc.), (? – c. 1842), was an Ojibwa chief and medicine man from the Lake St. Clair area.

He lived on the west shore of Lake St. Clair in present-day Michigan as a young man but, as an elderly chief, he moved with his family to Walpole Island in present-day Ontario. He was a man of great influence amongst the native population there and devoted much of the time until his death resisting the conversion to Christianity for both himself and the population of the island.

== Sources ==
- Biography at the Dictionary of Canadian Biography Online
