= Walpole–Algonac Ferry =

Coordinates: 42°37′00″N 82°31′24″W

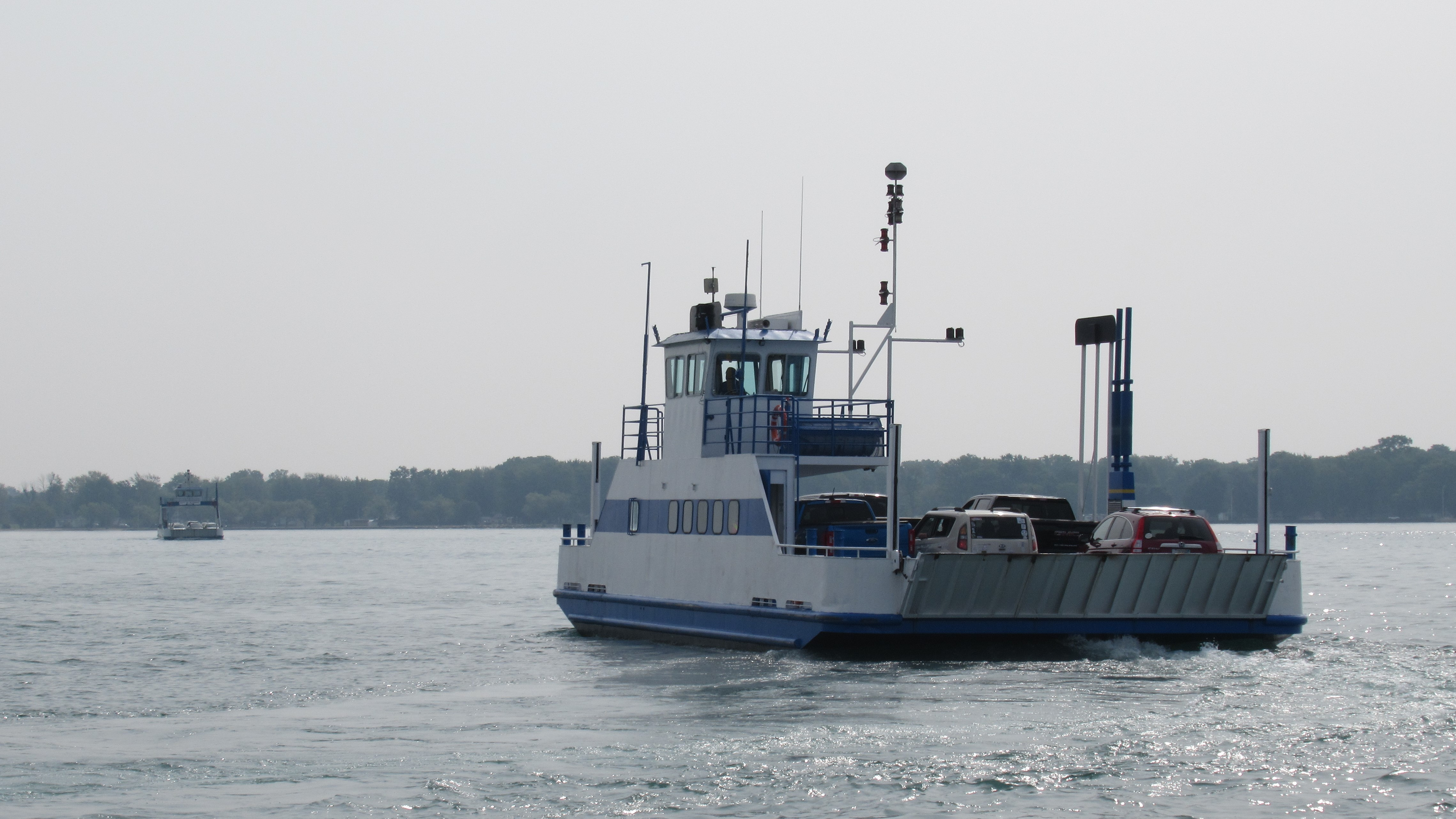
- Locale: (United States) Algonac, Michigan (Canada) Walpole Island, Ontario
- Waterway: St. Clair River
- Transit type: Ferry; Pedestrian and automobile
- Owner: Walpole Algonac Ferry Ltd.
- No. of vessels: 2
- Website: walpolealgonacferry.ca

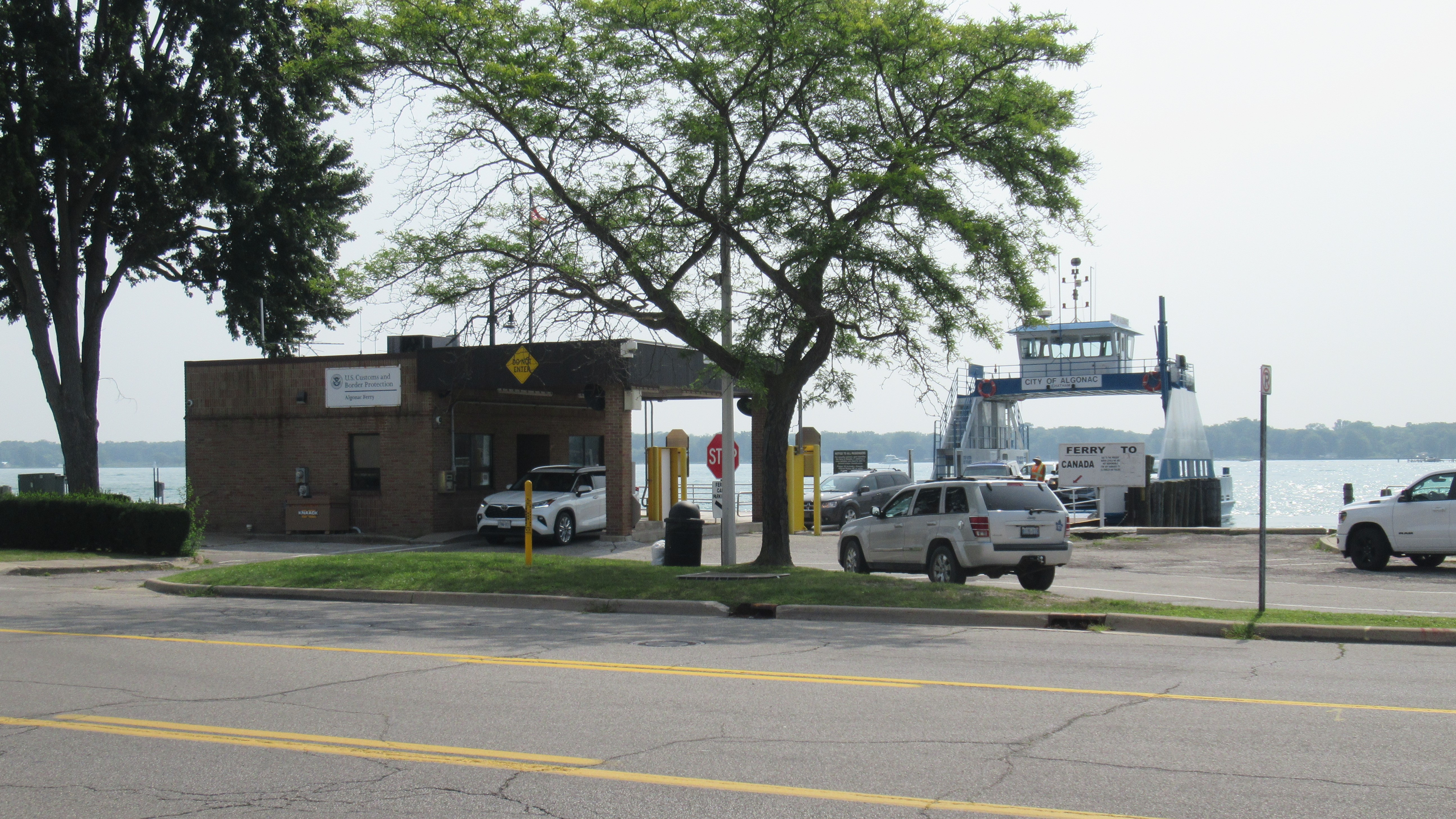
U.S. Customs and Border Protection checkpoint upon arriving in the United States

The Walpole–Algonac Ferry is a passenger and vehicle ferry connecting Walpole Island, Ontario, Canada, and Algonac, Michigan, United States, via the St. Clair River. It serves as a border crossing of the Canada–United States border.

The ferry has existed in some form since at least 1922, and is currently operated by Walpole Algonac Ferry Ltd., a private company based in Canada. Since the closures of the Bluewater Ferry in 2018 and the Detroit–Windsor Truck Ferry in 2023, it is the only ferry operating between Michigan and Ontario.

== Overview ==
The Walpole–Algonac Ferry operates from roughly 7 a.m. to 10 p.m. daily, weather permitting. There is no fixed schedule; ferries run continuously during operating hours, based on demand. A one-way trip takes roughly 8–15 minutes.

As of 2024, the service operates using two diesel-powered boats: the Walpole Islander, with a capacity of 9 cars, built in 1986; and the City of Algonac, with a capacity of 12 cars, built in 1990.

U.S. Customs and Border Protection and the Canada Border Services Agency operate ports of entry at their countries' respective docks.
