= Odawa =

Indigenous people of North America

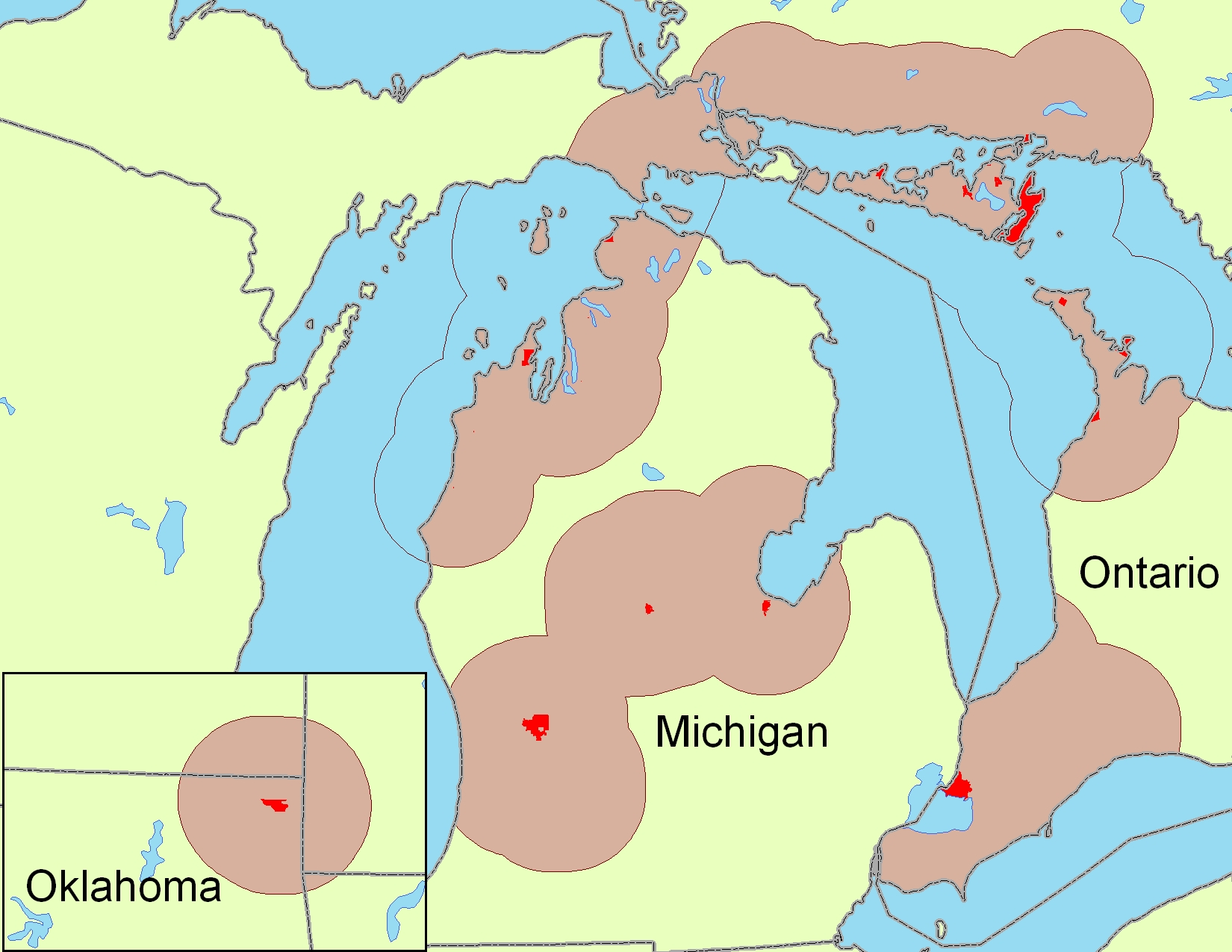
- Odawa group areas.

Total population
- 15,000

Regions with significant populations
- United States (Oklahoma, Michigan); Canada (Ontario)

Languages
- English, French, Ojibwe (Ottawa dialect)

Religion
- Midewiwin, Odawa religion, Christianity, other

Related ethnic groups
- Ojibwe, Potawatomi, and other Algonquian peoples

adaawe "to trade" / "to buy and sell"
- Person: Daawaa / Odaawaa; Ojibwe; Nishnaabe
- People: Daawaak / Odaawaag; Ojibweg; Nishnaabeg
- Language: Daawaamwin / Odaawaamwin; Ojibwemowin; Nishnaabemwin; Hand Talk
- Country: Daawaaying / Odaawaaying; Daawaaw’kii / Odaawaaw’kii; Ojibwewaki; Nishnaabew’kii

The Odawa (also Ottawa or Odaawaa /oʊˈdɑːwə/) are an Indigenous North American people who primarily inhabit land in the Eastern Woodlands region, now in jurisdictions of the northeastern United States and southeastern Canada. Their territory long preceded the creation of the current border between the two countries in the 18th and 19th centuries.

Their peoples are federally recognized as Native American tribes in the United States and have numerous recognized First Nations bands in Canada. They are one of the Anishinaabeg, related to but distinct from the Ojibwe and Potawatomi peoples.

After migrating from the East Coast in ancient times, they settled on Manitoulin Island, near the northern shores of Lake Huron, and the Bruce Peninsula in the present-day province of Ontario, Canada. They considered this their original homeland. After the 17th century, they also settled along the Ottawa River, and in what became the present-day states of Michigan and Wisconsin. They also occupied other areas of the Midwest south of the Great Lakes in what became the United States. In the 21st century, there are a total of approximately 15,000 Odawa living in Ontario, Canada, and in Michigan and Oklahoma (former Indian Territory, United States).

The Ottawa dialect is part of the Algonquian language family. This large family is made up of numerous smaller tribal groups or "bands", which are commonly called a "Tribe" in the United States and "First Nation" in Canada. Their language is considered a divergent dialect of Ojibwe, characterized by frequent syncope.

== Tribe name ==
Odawaa (syncoped as Daawaa) is believed to be derived from the Anishinaabe word adaawe, meaning "to trade", or "to buy and sell". This term is common to the Cree, Algonquin, Nipissing, Innu, Odawa, and Ojibwe. The Potawatomi spelling of Odawa and the English derivative "Ottawa" are also common. The Anishinaabe word for "those men who trade, or buy and sell" is Wadaawewinini(wag).

Frederic Baraga, a Catholic priest and missionary in Michigan, transliterated this and recorded it in his A Dictionary of the Otchipwe Language as "Watawawininiwok", noting that it meant "men of the bulrushes", associated with the many bulrushes in the Ottawa River. But, this recorded meaning is more appropriately associated with the Matàwackariniwak, a historical Algonquin band who lived along the Ottawa River.

Their neighbors applied the "Trader" name to the Odawa because in early traditional times, and also during the early European contact period, they were noted as intertribal traders and barterers. The Odawa were described as having dealt "chiefly in cornmeal, sunflower oil, furs and skins, rugs and mats, tobacco, and medicinal roots and herbs".

The Odawa name in its English transcription is the source of the place names of the Ottawa River, which in turn is the namesake of the city of Ottawa, Ontario. The Odawa home territory at the time of early European contact, but not their trading zone, was well to the west of the city and river named after them.

Ottawa, Ohio, is the county seat of Putnam County, developed at the site of the last Ottawa reservation in Ohio. There is also an Ottawa, Kansas.

== Language ==
The Odawa dialect is considered one of several divergent dialects of the Ojibwe language group, noted for its frequent syncope. In the Odawa language, the general language group is known as Nishnabemwin, while the Odawa language is called Daawaamwin. Of the estimated 5,000 ethnic Odawa and additional 10,000 people with some Odawa ancestry, in the early 21st century an estimated 500 people in Ontario and Michigan speak this language. The Ottawa Tribe of Oklahoma has three fluent speakers.

== Early history ==
=== Oral histories and early recorded histories ===
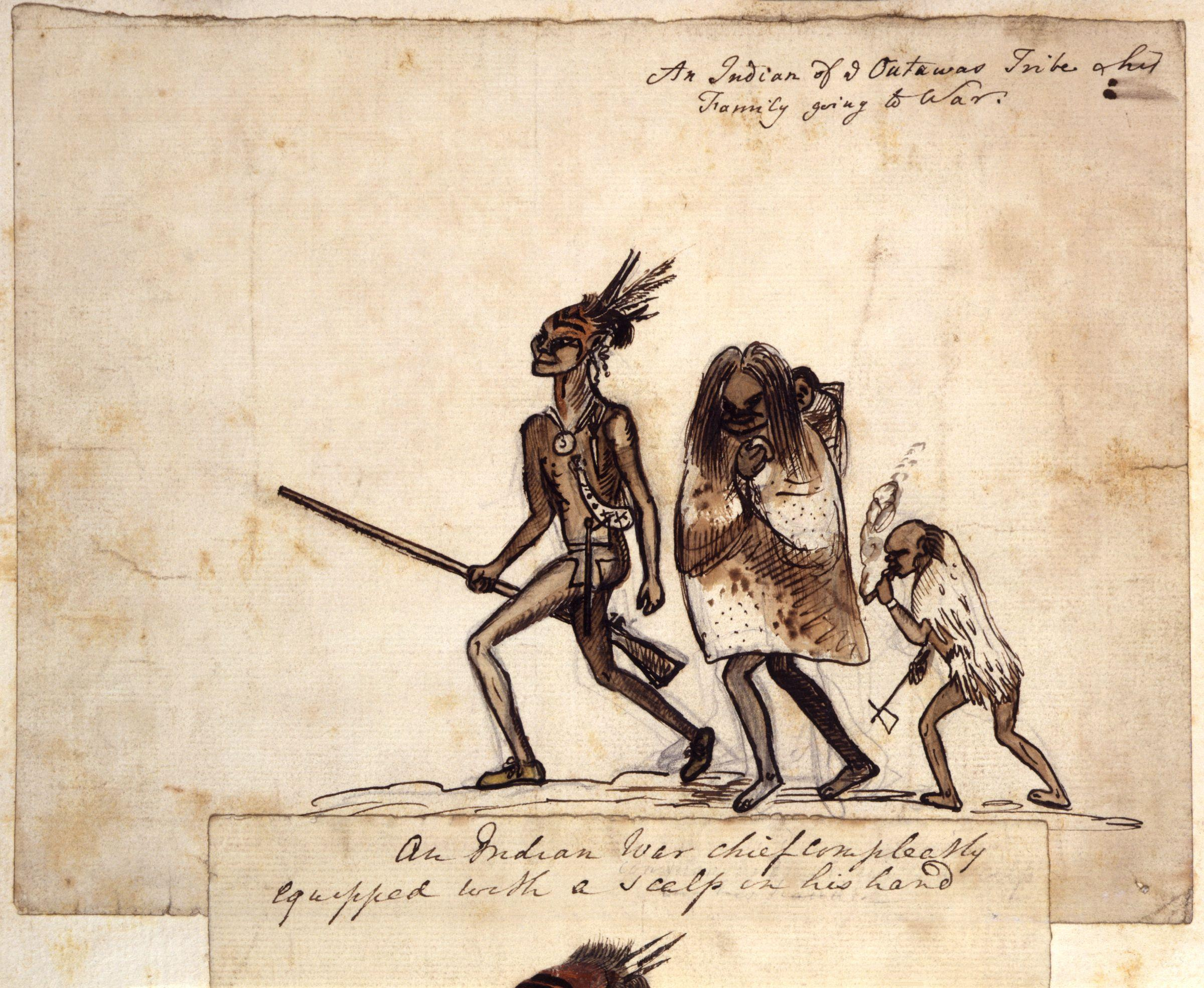
Mid-18th century sketch of an Odawa family by British soldier George Townshend

According to Anishinaabeg tradition, and from recordings in Wiigwaasabak (birch bark scrolls), the Odawa people came from the eastern areas of North America, or Turtle Island, and from a region called Dawnland along the East Coast (where there are numerous Algonquian-language peoples).

Directed by the miigis (luminescent) beings, the Anishinaabe peoples moved inland along the Saint Lawrence River. At the "Third Stopping Place" near what is now the Straits of Mackinac, Michigan, the southern group of Anishinaabeg divided into three groups, the Ojibwe, Odawa, and Potawatomi.

There is archaeological evidence that the Saugeen complex people, a Hopewell-influenced group who were located on the Bruce Peninsula during the Middle Woodland period, may have evolved into the Odawa people. The Hopewell tradition was a widely extended trading network operating from about 200 BCE to 500 CE. Some of these peoples constructed earthwork mounds for burials, a practice that ended about 250 CE. The Saugeen mounds have not been excavated.

The Odawa, together with the Ojibwe and Potawatomi, were part of a long-term tribal alliance called the Council of Three Fires. Together they fought the nations of the Haudenosaunee Confederacy (who came from the East) and the Dakota people.

In 1615 French explorer Samuel de Champlain met 300 men of a nation which, he said, "we call les cheueux releuez" (modern French spelling: cheveux relevés (hair lifted, raised, rolled up)), near the mouth of the French River. Of these, he said:

Their arms consisted only of a bow and arrows, a buckler of boiled leather and the club. They wore no breech clouts, their bodies were tattooed in many fashions and designs, their faces painted and their noses pierced.

In 1616, Champlain left the Wendat villages and visited the cheueux releuez, who lived westward from the lands of the Wendat Confederacy.

The Jesuit Relations of 1667 reported that three tribes lived in the same town: the Odawa, the Kiskakon Odawa, and the Sinago Odawa. All three tribes spoke the same language.

=== Fur trade ===
Due to the extensive trade network maintained by the Odawa, many of the North American interior nations became known to Europeans by the names the Odawa used for them (exonyms), rather than by the nations' own names (endonyms). For example, these exonyms include Winnebago (from Wiinibiigoo) for the Ho-Chunk, and Sioux (from Naadawensiw) for the Dakota. From the early days of the colony of New France, the Odawa became so important to the French and Canadians in fur trade that before 1670, colonists in Quebec (then called Canada) usually referred to any Algonquian speaker from the Great Lakes region as an Odawa. In their own language, the Odawa (like the Ojibwe) identified as Anishinaabe (Neshnabek) meaning "people".

The mostly highly prized fur was beaver, popular in Europe. Other furs traded included deer, marten, raccoon, fox, otter, and muskrat. In exchange the Odawa received "hatchets, knives, kettles, traps, needles, fish hooks, cloth and blankets, jewelry and decorative items, and later firearms and alcohol". Up to the time of Nicolas Perrot, the Odawa had a monopoly on all fur trade that came through Green Bay, Wisconsin, or Sault Ste. Marie, Michigan. They allegedly did "their best to exploit" the tribes in those areas "who did not use the canoe, by bartering with them bits of iron and steel and worn-out European articles for extravagant quantities of furs". For example, "the Crees gave the Ottawas 'all their beaver robes for old knives, blunted awls, wretched nets and kettles used until they were past service.'"

=== Wars and refugees ===
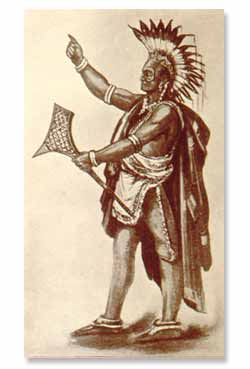
Odawa warrior with gunstock war club

The Odawa had disputes and warfare with other tribes, particularly over the lucrative fur trade. For example, the tribe once waged war against the Mascouten. In the mid-17th century the Odawa allied with other Algonquian tribes around the Great Lakes against the powerful Mohawk people (of present-day New York) and their Haudenosaunee allies in the Beaver Wars. The European introduction of guns and other weapons to some of their trading partners had disrupted the traditional balance of power in the region and changed economic risks and rewards. All indigenous peoples on both sides were disrupted or decimated; some groups, such as the Iroquoian-speaking Erie, were exterminated as tribes. But by the mid-17th century, the tribes were more severely affected by new infectious diseases than warfare. Lacking acquired immunity to these European diseases, they suffered epidemics with high fatalities.

In 1701, the French colonists built Fort Detroit and established a trading post. Many Odawa moved there from their traditional homeland of Manitoulin Island near the Bruce Peninsula, and Wyandot also moved near the post. Some Odawa had already settled across northern Michigan in the Lower Peninsula, and more bands established villages around and south of Detroit. Their area extended into present-day Ohio.

With movements of the tribes in relation to warfare and colonial encroachment, the tribes settled in roughly the following pattern: "Sandwiched between the French, in the north and west, and the English, in the south and east, the Miami settled in present-day Indiana and western Ohio; the Ottawa settled in Northwest Ohio along the Maumee, the Auglaize, and the Blanchard rivers; the Wyandot settled in Central Ohio; the Shawnee in Southwest Ohio; and the Delaware (Lenape) in Southeast and Eastern Ohio."

In the mid-18th century, the Odawa allied with their French trading partners against the British in the Seven Years' War, known as the French and Indian War in the North American colonies. They made raids against Anglo-American colonists. The Odawa chief Pontiac has historically been reported to have been born at the confluence of the Maumee and Auglaize rivers, where modern Defiance, Ohio, later developed. In 1763, after the British had defeated France, Pontiac led a rebellion against the British, but he was unable to prevent British colonial settlement of the region.

A decade later, Chief Egushawa (also spelled Agushawa), who had a village at the mouth of the Maumee River on Lake Erie (where Toledo later developed), led the Odawa as an ally of the British in the American Revolutionary War. He hoped to build on their support to exclude European-American colonists from his territory in northwest Ohio and southern Michigan. The defeat of the British by the United States had a far-ranging influence on British-allied Native American tribes, as many were forced to cede their land to the United States.

Following the Revolutionary War, in the 1790s, Egushawa, together with numerous members of other regional tribes, including the Wyandot and Council of Three Fires, Shawnee, Lenape, and Mingo, fought the United States in a series of battles and campaigns in what became known as the Northwest Indian War. The Indians hoped to repulse the European-American pioneers coming to settle west of the Appalachian Mountains, but were finally defeated.

In 1792 President George Washington sent Major Alexander Truman, his servant William Lynch, and guide/interpreter William Smalley on a peace mission to the tribes. Truman and Lynch were killed; Truman was apparently killed prior to April 20, 1792, at Lower Tawa Town, an Ottawa village (Ottawa, Putnam County Ohio). In a campaign during 1794, Anthony Wayne built a string of forts in the upper Maumee River watershed, including Fort Defiance, across the river from the site of Pontiac's birth. While the British had encouraged the Native American efforts, they did not want to get drawn into open conflict again with the United States and withdrew from offering direct support to the tribes. Wayne's army defeated several hundred members of the Indian confederacy at the Battle of Fallen Timbers, near the future site of Maumee, Ohio and about 11 miles upriver of present-day Toledo.

==== Raid on Pickawillany ====
In the winter of 1751–1752, Charles Langlade began assembling an allied war party of Odawa, Potawatomi, and Ojibwe warriors who traveled to Pickawillany. They attacked the village in mid-morning on June 21, 1752, and killed thirteen Miami men and captured five English traders. Down to as few as twenty warriors the Miami tried to negotiate terms of surrender, and Langlade promised to allow the Miami men to return home if they handed over the English. The Miami sent only three of the five Englishmen. When the Englishmen reached Langlade's lines, one of his men stabbed one of them to death, scalped the Englishman, and ripped his heart out and ate it in front of the Miami men. Langlade's men seized the Miami chief Memeskia. He was killed, boiled and eaten in front of his warriors. Afterward the Odawa released the Miami women and left for Detroit with four captured Englishmen and more than $300,000 worth (in today's dollars) of trade goods.

This French-led victory over the English is believed to have led to the French and Indian War and contributed to the Seven Years' War on the European continent.

=== Treaties and removals ===
In 1795, under the Treaty of Greenville, the Odawa and other members of the Western Confederacy ceded all of Ohio to the United States, except the northwest area. This was part of the area controlled by the Detroit Odawa.

In 1807, the Detroit Odawa joined three other tribes, the Ojibwe, Potawatomi and Wyandot people, in signing the Treaty of Detroit under pressure from the United States. The agreement, between the tribes and William Hull, representing the Michigan Territory, gave the United States a large portion of today's Southeastern Michigan and a section of northwest Ohio near the Maumee River.

Many Odawa bands moved away from the European Americans into northern Michigan. The tribes retained communal control of relatively small pockets of land in the territory of the Maumee River. Bands of Odawa-occupied areas are known as Roche de Boeuf and Wolf Rapids on the upper Maumee River.

In 1817, in the first treaty involving land cessions after the War of 1812, the Ohio Odawa ceded their lands, accepting reservations at Blanchard's Creek and the Little Auglaize River in Ohio (a total of 34 square miles or 88 square kilometres). These were only reserves, for which they were paid annuities for ten years. Pressure continued to build against the Odawa as European-American settlers moved into the area.

After passage of the Indian Removal Act of 1830, the US government arranged for the Odawa to cede their reserves in 1831. The four following bands eventually all removed to areas of Kansas, then part of Indian Territory: the Blanchard's Creek, Little Auglaize, Roche de Boeuf, and Wolf Rapids bands.

== Modern history ==
The population of the different Odawa groups has been estimated. In 1906, the Ojibwe and Odawa on Manitoulin and Cockburn Island were 1,497, of whom about half were Odawa. There were 197 Odawa listed as associated with the Seneca School in Oklahoma, where some Odawa had settled after the American Civil War. In 1900 in Michigan there were 5,587 scattered Ojibwe and Odawa, of whom about two-thirds are Odawa.

In the early 21st century, the total number of enrolled members of the federally recognized Ottawa Tribe of Oklahoma numbers about 4,700. There are about 10,000 persons who identify as Odawa in the United States, with the majority in Michigan. Another several thousand live in Ontario, Canada.

There has been one major anthropological study of the Grand Traverse Band of Ottawa and Chippewa Indians. Jane Willetts Ettawageshik devoted approximately two years of study in the Grand Traverse Band of Ottawa and Chippewa Indians community. Ettawageshik recorded Anishinaabe stories that speak of how the Anishinaabe people related to their land, to their people, and various other means of communicating their values, outlooks and histories in and around Northern Michigan. These stories have been translated into English by Howard Webkamigada and published as the book Ottawa Stories from the Springs.

== Known villages ==
The following are or were Odawa villages:

=== Former villages not on reserves/reservations ===
- Aegakotcheising
- Agushawas' Village
- Anamiewatigong
- Apontigoumy
- Kitchiwikwedongsing
- Machonee
- Menawzhetaunaung
- Michilimackinac
- Ogontz's Village
- Saint Simon Mission
- Shabawywyagun

=== Former reserves/reservations and their villages ===
By the end of the eighteenth century, the Ottawa in Ohio were concentrated in the northwest area along the Maumee River (which has its mouth at Lake Erie.)

The reservations and reserves listed below resulted from the Treaty of Greenville (1795), and following ones. These are listed by Frederick Webb Hodge in his 1910 history of American Indians North of Mexico.

- Auglaize Reserve, Ohio – Oquanoxa's Village
- Blanchard's Fork Reserve, Ohio – Lower Tawa Town, Upper Tawa Town
- North Maumee River Reserve, Ohio – Meshkemau's Village, Wassonquet's Village, Waugau's Village
- Obidgewong Reserve, Ontario – Obijewong, Ontario (located 2.5 kilometres (1.6 mi) east of Evansville, Ontario)
- Roche de Bœuf Reserve, Ohio – Nawash's Village, Tontaganie's Village
- South Maumee River Reserve, Ohio – 34-mile square reserve on the south side of the river. McCarty's Village (Tushquegan) was the principal one, located near Presque Isle. Ottokee and his band lived at the mouth of the Maumee River; he was a son of Otussa and grandson of chief Pontiac. His group were the last of the Odawa to remove in 1839 from Ohio to Kansas.
- Wolf Rapids Reserve, Ohio – Kinjoino's Village (Anpatonajowin, Aabitanagaajiwan))
- Ottawas of Blanchard's Fork Indian Reservation, Kansas – Ottawa
- Ottawas of Roche de Bœuf and Wolf Rapids Indian Reservation, Kansas

=== Current reserves/reservations and associated villages ===
- Grand Traverse Indian Reservation and Off-Reservation Trust Land, Michigan – Peshawbestown
- Little River Indian Reservation, Michigan – Manistee, Muskegon
- Little Traverse Bay Indian Reservation, Michigan ("Wequetonsing" (Wiikwedoonsing)) – Charlevoix, Cross Village, L'Arbre Croche ("Waganakisi" (Waaganaakizi)), Middle Village, Petoskey
- M'Chigeeng 22 Indian Reserve, Ontario – M'Chigeeng (formerly known as "West Bay")
- Ottawa Tribe of Oklahoma, Oklahoma – Miami, Oklahoma
- Point Grondine Indian Reserve, Ontario – Beaverstone
- Sheshegwaning 20 Indian Reserve, Ontario – Sheshegwaning
- Walpole Island 46 Indian Reserve, Ontario (Bakejiwanong (Bkejwanong)) – Foreplex, Myersville, Wallaceburg, Walpole Island, Williamsville
- Wiikwemkoong First Nation, Ontario – Buzwah, Kaboni, Maiangowi, Murray Hill, South Bay, Two O'Clock, Wabozominissing, Wikwemikong, Wikwemikonsing
- Zhiibaahaasing 19 Indian Reserve, Ontario (formerly known as "Cockburn Island 19 Indian Reserve")
- Zhiibaahaasing 19A Indian Reserve, Ontario – Zhiibaahaasing

== Governments ==
=== Recognized/status Odawa governments ===
United States:

- Grand Traverse Band of Ottawa and Chippewa Indians, Michigan (formerly Northern Michigan Ottawa Association, Unit 2)
- Little River Band of Ottawa Indians, Michigan (formerly "Northern Michigan Ottawa Association, Unit 7")
- Little Traverse Bay Bands of Odawa Indians, Michigan (formerly "Northern Michigan Ottawa Association, Unit 1")
- Ottawa Tribe of Oklahoma

Canada:

- M'Chigeeng First Nation (formerly "West Bay First Nation")
- Sheshegwaning First Nation, Ontario
- Walpole Island First Nation, Walpole Island located between Ontario and Michigan
- Wiikwemkoong First Nation, located on the Wiikwemkoong Reserve, Ontario
- Zhiibaahaasing First Nation, Ontario (formerly "Cockburn Island First Nation")

=== Other recognized/status governments with significant Odawa populations ===
Canada:

- Aamjiwnaang First Nation (Sarnia), Ontario
- Aundeck-Omni-Kaning First Nation (Sucker Creek), Ontario
- Chippewas of Kettle & Stony Point, Ontario
- Chippewas of Nawash First Nation, Ontario (formerly "Cape Croker First Nation")
- Chippewas of the Thames (Caradoc), Ontario
- Garden River First Nation, Ontario
- Mattagami First Nation, Ontario
- Mississauga First Nation, Ontario
- Sagamok Anishnawbek First Nation, Ontario
- Saugeen First Nation, Ontario
- Serpent River First Nation, Ontario
- Sheguiandah First Nation, Ontario
- Thessalon First Nation, Ontario
- Wasauksing First Nation (Parry Island), Ontario
- Whitefish Lake First Nation, Ontario
- Whitefish River First Nation (Birch Island), Ontario

United States:

- Match-e-be-nash-she-wish Band of Pottawatomi Indians of Michigan (formerly "Gun Lake Band of Grand River Ottawa Indians" and as part of "Northern Michigan Ottawa Association, Units 3 and 4")
- Saginaw Chippewa Tribal Nation, Michigan

=== Unrecognized Odawa governments ===
- Burt Lake Band of Ottawa and Chippewa Indians, Michigan (formerly "Northern Michigan Ottawa Association, Unit 8", currently recognized by Michigan)
- Genesee Valley Indian Association (formerly "Northern Michigan Ottawa Association, Unit 9")
- Grand River Bands of Ottawa Indians, Michigan (formerly "Northern Michigan Ottawa Association, Unit 3", currently recognized by Michigan)
- Mackinac Bands of Chippewa and Ottawa Indians, Michigan (formerly "Northern Michigan Ottawa Association, Units 11 through 17", currently recognized by Michigan)
- Maple River Band of Ottawa, Michigan
- Muskegon River Band of Ottawa Indians, Michigan (formerly "Northern Michigan Ottawa Association, Unit 5")
- Ottawa Colony Band of Grand River Ottawa Indians, Michigan (currently recognized only as part of the Match-e-be-nash-she-wish Band of Pottawatomi Indians of Michigan) (formerly part of "Northern Michigan Ottawa Association, Unit 3")

== Notable Odawa people ==
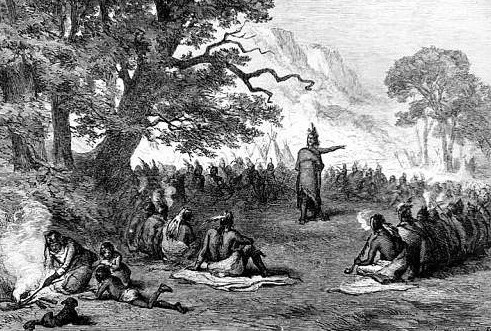
Odawa Chief Pontiac speaking at a council on April 27, 1763, 19th-century engraving.

- Jean-Baptiste Assiginack (1768–1866), chief and public servant
- Andrew Blackbird (c. 1814/1817–1908), tribal leader, historian, and author of tribal histories
- Kelly Church (born 1967), black ash basket weaver and birch bark biter
- Cobmoosa (1768–1866), chief
- Egushawa (c. 1726–1796), war chief
- Enmegahbowh (c. 1807–1902), first Native American to be ordained as an Episcopal priest
- Magdelaine Laframboise (1780–1846), Odawa-French fur trader and businesswoman, also supported public education for children on Mackinac Island; added in 1984 to Michigan's Women's Hall of Fame
- Daphne Odjig (1919–2016), Woodlands style painter and member of the Indian Group of Seven
- Petosegay (1787–1885), merchant and fur trader
- Pontiac (c. 1720–1769), chief. Leader of Pontiac's War against British and Americans
- Wawatam (fl. 1762–1764), chief
