= Blanchard's Fork Reserve, Ohio =

Former Ottawa Indian Reserve

Blanchard's Fork Reserve was an Ottawa Indian Reserve located in northwestern Ohio along the Blanchard River, also known as the Blanchard's Fork of the Auglaize River, a tributary of the Maumee River which ran to Lake Erie. The Reserve was established under the 1817 Treaty at the Foot of the Rapids of the Miami of Lake Erie (7 Stat. 160). This group became known officially as the Ottawa of Blanchard's Fork.

It consisted of 25 square miles (65 km^{2}) within the exterior boundaries of the Reserve. Within the Reserve were the villages of Upper Tawa Town and the Lower Tawa Town. Lower Tawa Town, present-day Ottawa, Ohio, was reported to be the last Ottawa reservation active in Ohio. The area of the reserve was part of the Great Black Swamp, and was not generally settled by whites until after the Civil War. The Reserve was ceded and dissolved under the 1831 Treaty of Miami Bay of Lake Erie (7 Stat. 359).

In 1898, Charles Royce in Eighteenth Annual Report enumerated the Blanchard's Fork Reserve as Tract 167.

After selling their land, the Ottawa of Blanchard's Fork moved to Kansas, and then to Indian Territory, where they joined other Ottawa people. In 1904, their group, which included other Ottawas, numbered 179 people.

== See also ==
- Nawash-Kinjoano Reservation, an Ottawa reservation located along the Maumee River
