= White River (Michigan) =

White River may refer to the following streams in the U.S. state of Michigan:

- White River (White Lake), in Muskegon and Oceana Counties
- White River (Huron County, Michigan), in Huron County

== See also ==
- White River (disambiguation)
- White River Township, Michigan
