= 8:00 A.M. (The Pitt season 1) =

- The Pitt episode
- Episode no.: Season 1 Episode 2
- Directed by: Amanda Marsalis
- Written by: R. Scott Gemmill
- Cinematography by: Johanna Coelho
- Editing by: Joey Reinisch
- Original air date: January 9, 2025
- Running time: 51 minutes

Guest appearances
- Amielynn Abellera as Perlah; Jalen Thomas Brooks as Mateo Diaz; Brandon Mendez Homer as Donnie; Kristin Villanueva as Princess; Mackenzie Astin as Jereme Spencer; Kim Bonifay as Amanda Jones; Joanna Going as Theresa Saunders; Michael Hyatt as Gloria Underwood; Brandon Keener as John Bradley; Krystel V. McNeil as Kiara Alfaro; Alexandra Metz as Dr. Yolanda Garcia; Riley Neldam as Drew Jones; David Reivers as Milton; Ashley Romans as Joyce St. Claire; Samantha Sloyan as Lily Bradley; Arun Storrs as Minu; Rebecca Tilney as Helen Spencer

Episode chronology
← Previous "7:00 A.M."	Next → "9:00 A.M."

"8:00 A.M." is the second episode of the first season of the American medical drama television series The Pitt. The episode was written by series creator R. Scott Gemmill, and directed by co-executive producer Amanda Marsalis. It was released on Max on January 9, 2025.

The series is set in Pittsburgh, following the staff of the Pittsburgh Trauma Medical Hospital ER (nicknamed "The Pitt") during a 15-hour emergency department shift. The series mainly follows Dr. Michael "Robby" Robinavitch, a senior attending still reeling from some traumas. In the episode, Robby faces two dilemmas in different cases, while Whitaker tries to save a man he befriended in the hospital.

The episode received positive reviews from critics, with praise towards the writing, character development and themes.

== Plot ==
After recovering from a PTSD flashback, Robby returns to the Pitt.

An unresponsive 18-year-old named Nick Bradley arrives by ambulance. Parents John and Lily Bradley arrive. Tests determine that Nick overdosed on Xanax laced with fentanyl and is now brain dead. Robby uses unnecessary tests instead of telling them directly. Collins warns him not to give them false hope, and says he is the one who needs to process and accept his grief.

Robby tends to Mr. Spencer, an elderly man with pneumonia, sepsis, and Alzheimer's who is accompanied by his adult son Jereme and daughter Helen. Despite Spencer's advanced directive, Helen wants to keep her father intubated, with her brother reluctantly supporting her decision. Robby disagrees and considers not following their wishes but Helen threatens to sue. Collins offers to help him overrule them, but he intubates Mr. Spencer.

Langdon and Mel inform the parents of a 4-year-old who ate weed gummies that they must mandatory report the incident to Child Services. The mother tries to take the child home and starts shouting, so Robby tells her to calm down or she may be arrested.

Mel shares she has a sister with special needs. Santos does a procedure without permission. A police officer flirts with Collins but she declines. Myrna, a regular who is handcuffed to a wheelchair, harasses Robby. McKay's ankle monitor goes off erroneously, revealing she has been found guilty of a crime, surprising Javadi. Regular patient Earl, whose medical situation is never revealed in the show, asks staff members for a sandwich.

While bringing an unhoused man into the ER, three rats escape from his clothes and Mel diagnoses him with scurvy. Other cases include a man with an electric dog collar glued to his neck and a man who got into a scooter accident while not wearing a helmet, resulting in a Le Fort III facial fracture. Javadi clashes with Santos. Mohan correctly identifies that Joyce St. Claire, a woman who presented with crippling pain and restrained by the EMTs, was not a drug-seeker but has sickle cell disease. Whitaker finds his patient, Mr. Milton, unresponsive in the hallway and begins resuscitation efforts.

== Production ==
=== Development ===
The episode was written by series creator R. Scott Gemmill, and directed by co-executive producer Amanda Marsalis. This marked Gemmill's second writing credit, and Marsalis' first directing credit.

=== Writing ===
Regarding Robby's role among the many events in the hospital, Noah Wyle said, "He's immersing himself in work, but he's doing exactly what anybody would be doing in his job on shift, which is you've got your head on a swivel and you move through the department like a shark and if you don't put eyes and hands on every patient it could come back and bite you in the ass. He's done it long enough that he's just second nature to getting in everybody's business and making sure everybody's doing the best job they can."

== Critical reception ==
"8:00 A.M." received positive reviews from critics. Laura Bogart of The A.V. Club gave the episode a "B+" grade and wrote, "Despite his own desires, and what he knows is right, Robby goes to add more suffering to the day by ventilating the older man. It's only hour two, and we've already seen the entire spectrum of human emotion."

Alan Sepinwall wrote, "If you are a viewer of a certain age, it's hard to avoid viewing the show through an ER lens, at least at first. Hey, John Carter grew back his beard again! Hey, now it's Carter giving the tour to the kids who look as overwhelmed as he used to! But both Wyle and the show quickly establish their own rhythms." Maggie Fremont of Vulture gave the episode a perfect 5 star rating out of 5 and wrote, "this second episode lets us know that this show's focus on the technical aspects of being an emergency-medicine doctor doesn't mean it won't also have some major emotional moments. The Pitt is going to be fast moving with a whole bunch of medical jargon, but it's also going to move you to tears. Prepare yourselves."

Johnny Loftus of Decider wrote, "The Pitt as teaching hospital and its staff as knowledge guides is becoming the biggest thematic set piece in this series, bigger even than its one-episode-as-one-hour timeline. That gimmick could retain more of its significance, if there was a time stamp bug in our screen's corner, like in 24, or it emphasized the advancing timeline in relation to Wyle's character. But since it doesn't, it's seeing experienced doctors like Robby, Langdon, Collins, and Dr. Samira Mohan challenge their med student charges that's generating watchability." Gabriela Burgos Soler of Telltale TV wrote, "As he is asked to take charge in the demanding cases, Dr. Robby delegates the newcomers to the rest of the doctors. This was the perfect opportunity for both them and the audience to know who runs the place when Dr. Robby isn't there."
