= 12:00 P.M. (The Pitt season 1) =

- The Pitt episode
- Episode no.: Season 1 Episode 6
- Directed by: Damian Marcano
- Written by: Cynthia Adarkwa
- Cinematography by: Johanna Coelho
- Editing by: Lauren Pendergrass
- Original air date: February 6, 2025
- Running time: 47 minutes

Guest appearances
- Amielynn Abellera as Perlah; Jalen Thomas Brooks as Mateo Diaz; Brandon Mendez Homer as Donnie; Kristin Villanueva as Princess; Abby Ryder Fortson as Kristi Wheeler; Ivy George as Alana Dunn; Joanna Going as Theresa Saunders; Stacie Greenwell as Tina Chambers; Deepti Gupta as Dr. Eileen Shamsi; Michael Hyatt as Gloria Underwood; Brandon Keener as John Bradley; Krystel V. McNeil as Kiara Alfaro; Alexandra Metz as Dr. Yolanda Garcia; Marguerite Moreau as Lynette Wheeler; Tyler Poelle as Silas Dunn; Ashley Romans as Joyce St. Claire; Samantha Sloyan as Lily Bradley; Arun Storrs as Minu; Shu Lan Tuan as Ginger Kitajima; Tracy Vilar as Lupe Perez; Ellen Wroe as Eloise Wheeler

Episode chronology
← Previous "11:00 A.M."	Next → "1:00 P.M."

"12:00 P.M." is the sixth episode of the American medical drama television series The Pitt. The episode was written by producer Cynthia Adarkwa, and directed by co-executive producer Damian Marcano. It was released on Max on February 6, 2025.

The series is set in Pittsburgh, following the staff of the Pittsburgh Trauma Medical Hospital ER (nicknamed "The Pitt") during a 15-hour emergency department shift. The series mainly follows Dr. Michael "Robby" Robinavitch, a senior attending still reeling from some traumas. In the episode, Robby discovers that chief medical officer Gloria plans to entrust the Pitt to a management group unless their stats improve, while the staff finally learns who stole their ambulance.

The episode received mostly positive reviews from critics, who praised the writing and themes in the episode.

== Plot ==
Kristi, her mother Eloise, and aunt Lynette, argue over whether Kristi should get an abortion. Robby is approached by Gloria, who introduces him to Dr. Tracy Morris, regional manager of ECQ America, a contract management group. She warns Robby that she will entrust the Pitt to ECQ if patient satisfaction scores do not improve, despite Robby protesting that the lack of resources and limited staff make it complicated.

Santos drops a scalpel that stabs Garcia's foot while treating a patient. Collins, Langdon, and Javadi treat two frat boys responsible for the ambulance's theft after they crash it. Upon confirming their real motives, Collins ends up winning the staff bet.

Robby praises Mohan for her attentiveness and reminds the team about patient satisfaction scores. Javadi and McKay visit Javadi's mother while she is tending to a patient, but McKay is taken aback by her overbearing behavior. Kiara and Dana comfort Mel and encourage her to talk with Ginger about her daughter's disappearance. Robby confirms to Nick's parents that he is brain dead and introduces them to family support specialist Emma, but his mother storms out when asked about her son's consent to organ donation. Santos and Langdon inform Joseph that he had neurocysticercosis. McKay suggests reporting David to law enforcement for making a list of girls he wanted to hurt, (Note: As seen in "7:00 A.M.".) but Robby disagrees.

Mel calls her sister Becca, agreeing to see each other after her shift ends. Kristi locks herself in the bathroom and refuses to leave without the abortion medication, prompting Eloise and Lynette to begin fighting. Collins tries to stop the situation, but they push her aside as the conflict continues.

== Production ==
=== Development ===
The episode was written by producer Cynthia Adarkwa, and directed by co-executive producer Damian Marcano. This marked Adarkwa's first writing credit, and Marcano's second directing credit.

=== Writing ===
Isa Briones said she was fascinated by the "undoing of a character", and loved how Santos' behavior eventually caught up with her in the episode. She explained, "I think it's just a fun moment of starting to really see the facade breaking down and realizing how imperfect she is and how she's still very early in her career. She's an intern. It's her first day. She is low on the totem pole, not as high and mighty as she might think she is."

== Critical reception ==
"12:00 P.M." received mostly positive reviews from critics. Laura Bogart of The A.V. Club gave the episode a "B" grade and wrote, "There's room for the series to mine some shades of gray between the black-and-white positions taken by Robby and Gloria. Yes, healthcare is widely underfunded, unless you're one of the wealthy elite who can tap into private resources, and in the post-COVID crunch, the medical professionals culturally lauded as heroes have been left in the lurch. But also? It's very human and understandable to be angry at wait times longer than a work day and to expect to be treated with compassion in one of the most vulnerable moments of your life."

Maggie Fremont of Vulture gave the episode a 4 star rating out of 5 and wrote, "Now, unfortunately for all of us, the fact that Heather is having weird pains she isn’t telling anyone about and is starting to allow herself to get excited about this pregnancy for sure means this is going to end badly. I have spent too many hours watching television dramas to let The Pitt think it is getting one past me, okay? Prove me wrong, babe!" Nick Bythrow of Screen Rant wrote, "Despite the circular nature of these particular stories, The Pitt episode 6 still keeps up the momentum with more emotional storytelling for Robby, alongside in-depth glimpses into the students and residents' mindsets. While this was the least eventful episode in quite some time, it still kept itself engaging thanks to the emotional and professional problems the doctors face. It offers a perfect building block for future installments to impress, especially as the day continues weighing on various characters."

Johnny Loftus of Decider wrote, "Collins tries a doctor's gentle but firm hand on the shoulder, and is physically pushed for her trouble. In a dramatic setup like this, the expectation that Collins would fall and threaten the health of her unborn child was high. (The Pitt is not immune to soap opera moments.) But while it fortunately does not go down like that, if anybody ever needed to be reassured by a soulful charge nurse, it's Kristi's family." Gabriela Burgos Soler of Telltale TV gave the episode a 4 star rating out of 5 and wrote, "The strengths of this episode are definitely the interactions between those who hadn't even stood next to each other in a while, most notably Javadi, Whitaker, and Santos."

== Accolades ==
Award	Year	Category	Recipient	Result	Ref.
Black Reel TV Awards	2025	Outstanding Writing in a Drama Series	Cynthia Adarkwa	Nominated	
NAACP Image Awards	2026	Outstanding Writing in a Drama Series	Cynthia Adarkwa	Won	
