= The Pitt =

American medical television drama series

- Genre: Medical drama; Procedural drama; Psychological drama
- Created by: R. Scott Gemmill
- Showrunner: R. Scott Gemmill
- Starring: Noah Wyle; Tracy Ifeachor; Patrick Ball; Katherine LaNasa; Supriya Ganesh; Fiona Dourif; Taylor Dearden; Isa Briones; Gerran Howell; Shabana Azeez; Sepideh Moafi
- Music by: Gavin Brivik
- Ending theme: "Fail Forward" by Gavin Brivik and Taji (season 1); "We Are Back" / "Fourth of July" by Gavin Brivik (season 2)
- Country of origin: United States
- Original language: English
- No. of seasons: 2
- No. of episodes: 30

Production
- Executive producers: R. Scott Gemmill; John Wells; Noah Wyle; Michael Hissrich; Erin Jontow; Simran Baidwan; Joe Sachs
- Producer: Michelle Lankwarden
- Cinematography: Johanna Coelho
- Editors: Mark Strand; Joey Reinisch; Lauren Pendergrass; Annie Eifrig; Tamera Luciano
- Running time: 41–61 minutes
- Production companies: John Wells Productions; R. Scott Gemmill Productions; Warner Bros. Television

Original release
- Network: Max
- Release: January 9 – April 10, 2025
- Network: HBO Max
- Release: January 8, 2026 – present

The Pitt is an American medical drama television series created by R. Scott Gemmill and executive produced by John Wells and Noah Wyle. It is Gemmill, Wells, and Wyle's second collaboration; they previously worked together on ER (1994–2009). It stars Wyle, Tracy Ifeachor, Patrick Ball, Katherine LaNasa, Supriya Ganesh, Fiona Dourif, Taylor Dearden, Isa Briones, Gerran Howell, Shabana Azeez, and Sepideh Moafi. Each season follows emergency department staff at a fictional Pittsburgh Trauma Medical Center as they navigate a single 12-hour shift amid staff shortages, underfunding, and personal crises. Each episode is set in real time and depicts approximately one hour of the shift.

The Pitt premiered on Max (later rebranded as HBO Max) on January 9, 2025. The series has received critical acclaim for its performances, writing, direction, format, and realism. It has also been praised by physicians and medical publications for its accuracy, realistic representation of healthcare workers, and portrayal of the stressors faced by medical staff in a post-pandemic world. The Pitt was renewed for a second season in February 2025, which premiered on January 8, 2026. In January 2026, ahead of the second-season premiere, the series was renewed for a third season.

The series has received several accolades, winning eleven awards at the Primetime Emmy Awards, including Outstanding Drama Series (two wins) and Outstanding Casting (two wins), along with acting wins for Wyle (two wins) and LaNasa (one win). It also received Best Television Series – Drama at the 83rd Golden Globe Awards. Additionally, it was listed as one of the 10 best television programs of 2025 by the American Film Institute.

== Premise ==
In the first season, attending physician Dr. Michael "Robby" Robinavitch starts a shift at the Pittsburgh Trauma Medical Center's emergency room (ER), nicknamed "the Pitt". Four trainee doctors join the team. Throughout the next fifteen hours, the students and residents learn more about their professional duties, while trying to deal with the emotional toll of patient care and the hardships of working in an overcrowded and underfunded ER. They are guided by Robby and the Pitt's other staff members. Meanwhile, Robby struggles to cope with traumatic memories resurfacing on the fourth anniversary of his mentor's death, which happened in the Pitt during the COVID-19 pandemic.

The second season takes place ten months later, on the 4th of July. Robby meets the attending physician who will be taking over for him while he is on a three-month sabbatical. A staff member returns from time away, while two medical students and a nursing school graduate join the team.

== Cast and characters ==
In decreasing order of seniority, the medical hierarchy begins with the attending physician, followed by senior residents, junior residents (categorized by year), interns (first-year residents), and finally, medical students (categorized by year). Nurses and other medical staff have their own hierarchy not listed here.

- Noah Wyle as Dr. Michael "Robby" Robinavitch, a senior attending physician at the Pitt. He cares about his hospital, staff, and patients but is struggling with PTSD from the COVID-19 pandemic. In season two, he is suffering from burnout and depression, and plans to take a sabbatical.
- Tracy Ifeachor as Dr. Heather Collins (season 1), a senior resident who is secretly pregnant. She and Robby have a romantic past.
- Patrick Ball as Dr. Frank Langdon, a quick-witted senior resident. He is found to be struggling with addiction and stealing medication from the hospital, and is sent home by a furious and betrayed Robby toward the end of season one. He returns in season two having gone to rehab.
- Katherine LaNasa as Dana Evans, the no-nonsense day-shift charge nurse. She puts on a strong front but is compassionate when the staff or patients need her.
- Supriya Ganesh as Dr. Samira Mohan (seasons 1–2), a third-year, and later fourth-year, resident trying to find balance between diligence and speed.
- Fiona Dourif as Dr. Cassie McKay, an empathetic, 42-year-old second-year, and later third-year, resident. She is raising her young son, Harrison, as a single mother. During the first season, she is on house arrest and wears an ankle monitor due to a past criminal conviction.
- Taylor Dearden as Dr. Melissa "Mel" King, a neurodivergent second-year, and later third-year, resident with an autistic twin sister. Mel connects with Langdon in season one and is one of the few staff members who seem happy about his return in season two.
- Isa Briones as Dr. Trinity Santos, a cocky, ambitious intern and later second-year resident. Although she can come off as cold, Santos lets Whitaker, whom she nicknames "Huckleberry", live with her after learning he is homeless in season one. She also has a complicated relationship with surgical resident Dr. Yolanda Garcia in season two.
- Gerran Howell as Dr. Dennis Whitaker, a gentle but naive fourth-year medical student. He becomes a doctor by the second season and mentors two new medical students.
- Shabana Azeez as Victoria Javadi, a 20-year-old third-year, and later fourth-year, medical student whose parents are also physicians at PTMC. In season two, she is also a medical influencer going by the name "Dr. J".
- Sepideh Moafi as Dr. Baran Al-Hashimi (season 2–present), a new attending physician at the Pitt who arrives as Robby's interim replacement ahead of his sabbatical.
- Ayesha Harris as Dr. Parker Ellis (season 3; recurring seasons 1–2), a night shift senior resident.

== Production ==
=== Development ===
From the 1990s, actor Noah Wyle and television producers R. Scott Gemmill and John Wells worked together on the set of the medical drama television series ER, which aired from 1994 to 2009. ER became successful throughout its run, influencing subsequent medical drama series. After its end, Gemmill and Wyle purposefully pursued projects unrelated to the genre, with Gemmill saying he thought he "would never do a medical show again, because we had done it so well". In 2020, Wyle began receiving an influx of direct messages on Instagram and fan mail from first responders working in the healthcare system, thanking him for inspiring them to pursue emergency medicine, with his role as Dr. John Carter in ER, and talking about their struggles during the ongoing COVID-19 pandemic. Wyle shared many of the messages with Wells, with whom he thought he could make a television series dealing with the contemporary challenges faced by healthcare workers and the spread of health misinformation. Meanwhile, Gemmill began thinking about possibilities to innovate the genre of the medical drama after having a conversation with a fellow television writer. Gemmill, Wells, and Wyle kept in contact with each other and with other ER collaborators, such as television writer and ER doctor Joe Sachs, who shared his experiences in the healthcare system.

Over the next few years, Gemmill, Wells, and Wyle began sharing their ideas and developing an ER spin-off focused on Carter, also recruiting Sachs and other ER collaborators such as Mel Herbert. However, Warner Bros. Television could not come to an agreement with the estate of ER creator Michael Crichton, overseen by his widow, Sherri Alexander Crichton, leading to the project being abandoned. Nevertheless, Max, a streaming service affiliated with Warner Bros. Discovery, expressed their interest in making a medical drama series starring Wyle with the team. At the time, Max CEO Casey Bloys was searching for a network-style procedural drama that could keep audiences engaged for several weeks. Additionally, he sought to expand the service's library with original releases and define the characteristics of a "Max Original", as opposed to the HBO series that Max also offers. The team began developing The Pitt after the end of the Writers Guild of America's strike in the fall of 2023. After switching to Max, Gemmill initially thought of adopting the narrative device of real time, following a twelve-hour shift at the hospital, due to the time constraints of direct-to-stream series, which are usually afforded a maximum of twelve episodes. Instead, Bloys suggested doing fifteen episodes, wanting to reduce the wait time in between seasons and avoid it feeling "like an extension of a streaming show".

In March 2024, Max gave the production a fifteen-episode straight-to-series order for The Pitt, overseen by John Wells Productions in association with Warner Bros. Television. Each episode had a reported budget of US$4 million to US$6 million dollars. Bloys explained that the lower per-episode budget made it possible to order more episodes than is typical for streaming services. Gemmill, Wells, and Wyle are the executive producers along with Simran Baidwan, Michael Hissrich, and Erin Jontow. Credited as The Pitt's creator, Gemmill wrote the pilot episode and serves as the series' showrunner. In February 2025, Max ordered a second season of The Pitt. The season chronicles a shift in the ER on Independence Day—Langdon's first day at work after going to an inpatient rehabilitation facility. Wyle explained their choice, saying: "The biggest driver of [the Season 2 time jump is] Langdon ... Nine, basically 10 months later, gives a lot of room for us to have developed a few stories in the interim and catch up with everyone. And with it being Langdon's first day back, we get to catch up as he catches up with all those people." In January 2026, a day before the second-season premiere, Max renewed the series for a third season.

=== Filming ===
To design The Pitt's sets, Wells approached production designer Nina Ruscio, with whom he had previously worked on Shameless (2011–2021) and Animal Kingdom (2016–2022). Ruscio had already committed to other productions, but agreed to Wells' request to provide an initial blueprint of The Pitt's main set, the ER; the writers used it to track the development of the characters' storylines across space hour by hour, before even beginning to work on the script. Ultimately, Ruscio managed to join the production and met with Gemmill, Hissrich, Wells, and Wyle to discuss the details. The team informed her of their plan to shoot in continuity with handheld cameras, therefore requiring a set with capacity for freedom of movement. They decided that the ER would have last been remodeled in 2010, so it did not include any advancements that were developed during the COVID-19 pandemic. Ruscio planned to create a transparent space with full visibility from all angles to allow for filming of simultaneous foreground and background action. She researched hospital designs with the help of Sachs and visited several ERs to create a functional set without the guidance of a script—a first for Ruscio and an uncommon approach in the television industry.

A team of about 125 people built the 25-bed ER, occupying over 20,000 square feet (1,900 m^{2}), on a sound stage owned by Warner Bros. in Burbank, California, in ten weeks. The waiting room and the trauma center were built on another sound stage next to the ER. The overall set cost over $4 million. Ruscio focused on five main aspects of the set: the palette, the floor, the lighting, the ceiling, and the layout. For the color palette and the lighting, she worked with The Pitt's cinematographer Johanna Coelho. Ruscio said she selected a realistic, bleached palette to convey the sterile feeling of entering an ER. Ruscio and Coelho then did a camera test to select the final fifty shades of white that worked best with the widest range of skin tones and with the LED light system that would be used. Moreover, Ruscio incorporated other tones: cream, gray, and blue for the floors; wood for the walls; and occasionally gray, yellow, and black, which are Pittsburgh's colors. For the light system, Ruscio and Coelho created custom, adjustable bi-color LED strips that made up an integrated ceiling rig of 300 lighting cues along with warmer overhead practical lights that provide contrast. The combined use of the top lighting, the white palette of the setting, and the darker palette of the wardrobe served to make the actors stand out and highlight both foreground and background action. Lyn Paolo served as costume designer.

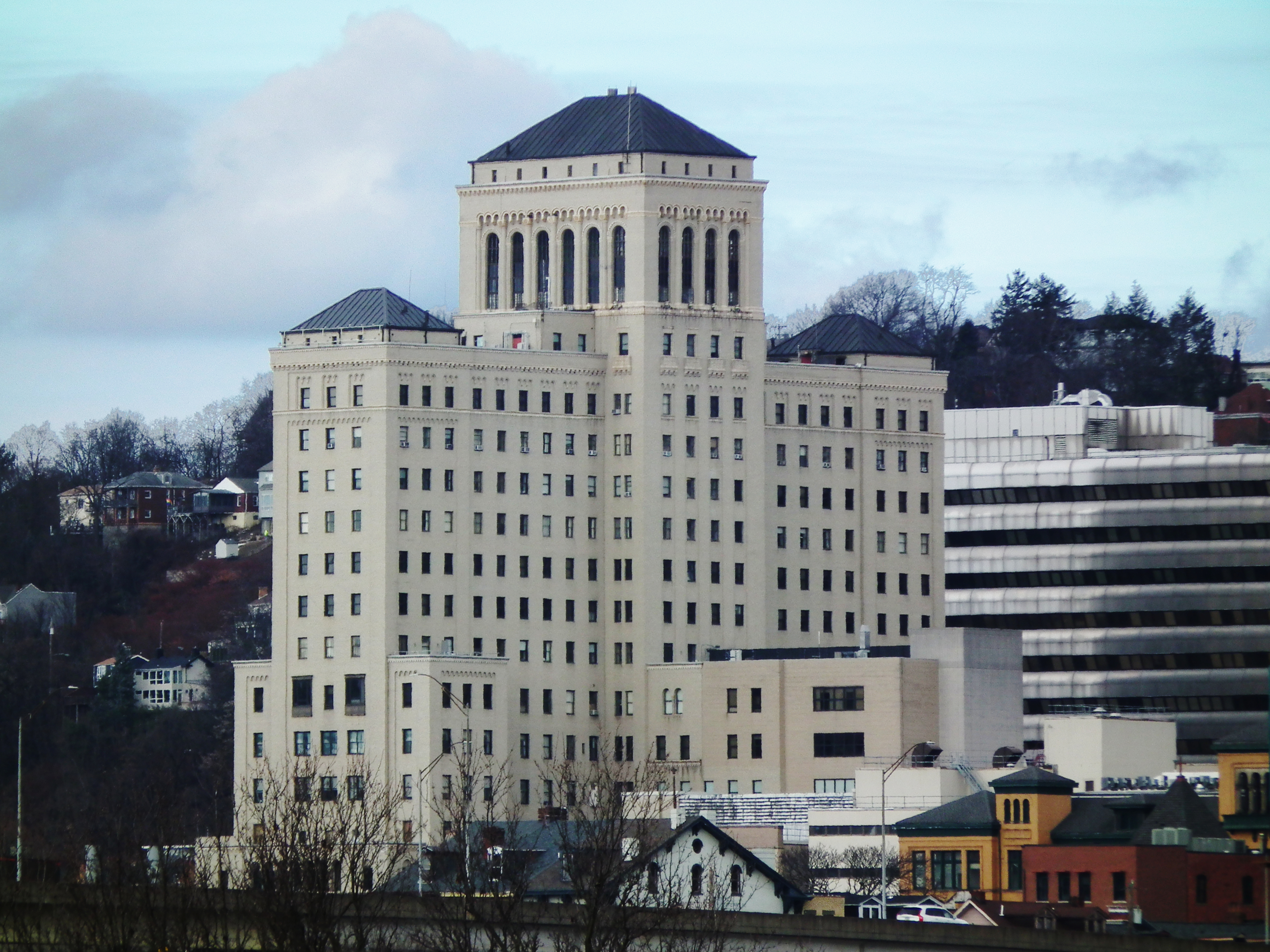
Additional scenes from the series were shot at Allegheny General Hospital.

For the layout, Ruscio collaborated with art director Josh Lusby, set designer Dean Wolcott, set decorator Matt Callahan, and prop master Rick Ladomade. She envisioned what she defines a "cup and curve" layout of the set, with curvilinear floors and ceilings that guide the eye of the viewer and allow freedom of movement while filming. Ruscio designed each set element with Lusby and Wolcott, paying attention to the ergonomics of an ER. Ruscio incorporated in the set architectural references to Pittsburgh, in particular to Allegheny General Hospital, which was selected as the exterior of the fictional hospital. She used marble columns to figuratively convey how the Pitt—located in the hospital's basement—both supports the structure and bears its burdens. Callahan and Ladomade reached out to medical equipment manufacturers to furnish the facility, striving to replicate the precise layout of a real medical facility. The team personally designed and built the nurses' station. To portray accurately the medical procedures, The Pitt uses almost exclusively practical effects with few modifications in post-production. The team collaborated with special effects company Autonomous FX to create several of the prosthetics featured in the series.

Filming for the second season began in Burbank on June 16, 2025.

=== Writing ===
Baidwan, Gemmill, Sachs, and Wyle constituted a writers' room by December 2023, along with Cynthia Adarkwa, Valerie Chu, and Elyssa Gershman. The team collaborated extensively on developing narratively and spatially the continuous structure of The Pitt, by storyboarding and tracking each patient's journey along with the background action happening in the ER. Sachs described the process of writing an episode: each writer would prepare an outline for specific episodes usually consisting of a maximum of two lines for each scene; review them with the staff; consult with medical experts for information on technical dialogue; write a first draft; review the draft with the team after two weeks; and keep rewriting drafts until it could go to production. Sachs and Gemmill stated that the writers started by defining the main characters' arcs and later established which medical case best fit their journey and illustrated their qualities in a brief period of time. By using real-time narration, Gemmill sought to highlight the importance of time, which he believed set emergency medicine apart from other medical specialties. Sachs said that the writers used the narrative device to build suspense by extending some patients' storylines across multiple episodes while suddenly ending others. After writing the episodes, the staff consulted with Wells on both writing and production.

The team reunited in the writers' room in March 2025 for the second season; Herbert joined the writing staff for the first time. Wyle wrote two episodes in the second season, having also written two for the first. He additionally directed the sixth episode. In August 2025, it was announced that Shawn Hatosy, who plays a recurring role as Dr. Jack Abbot, directed the ninth episode of the second season.

The series also develops Robby's Jewish identity: in the first season he recites the Shema during a low point, while a second-season episode written by Wyle addresses Robby's complicated relationship with Jewish faith.

=== Casting ===
Wyle took an active part in the casting process along with casting director Cathy Sandrich Gelfond, aiming to recreate with the new ensemble the camaraderie that he had shared with the ER cast. He wrote a mission statement for prospective actors, which declared: "This is a very specific type of show. It's intense. It's fast-paced. It's like theater. We are a group of players. If you can be a team player who is ready to lock in with a family, then this is the place for you." Additionally, Wyle emphasized the physicality of the roles and the preference for actors with experience working in theater and handling props. Due to the continuous structure of the series, the casting call for extras asked for actors with open availability for seven months, instead of the few days usually requested in other television productions. For the series regulars, The Pitt advertised in the casting call a two-tier fixed salary system, with per-episode fees of $50,000 and $35,000 depending on the role.

In July 2024, Tracy Ifeachor, Patrick Ball, Supriya Ganesh, Fiona Dourif, Taylor Dearden, Isa Briones, Gerran Howell, Shabana Azeez, and Katherine LaNasa were announced to have joined the cast as series regulars. In August 2024, Shawn Hatosy, Michael Hyatt, Jalen Thomas Brooks, Brandon Mendez Homer, Kristin Villanueva, Amielynn Abellera, Alexandra Metz, Krystel V. McNeil, and Deepti Gupta were announced to have been cast in recurring roles. Before the start of production, the cast spent two weeks with three ER doctors learning various medical techniques, such as suturing, intubation, medical ultrasonography, and CPR; extras also received medical training.

In May 2025, the casting process for the second season began. The boot camp for the second season began on June 1, 2025. In June 2025, Charles Baker, Irene Choi, Laëtitia Hollard, and Lucas Iverson were cast in recurring capacities while Sepideh Moafi was cast as a new series regular for the second season. In July 2025, it was reported that Ifeachor exited the series. In the same month, Lawrence Robinson joined the cast in a recurring role for the second season. In August 2025, Zack Morris was cast in a recurring capacity. In September 2025, Victor Rivas Rivers joined the cast as a guest star for the second season. In December 2025, Brittany Allen, Bonita Friedericy, Taylor Handley, Jeff Kober, Meta Golding, Luke Tennie, Christopher Thornton, Travis Van Winkle, Rusty Schwimmer, Jayne Taini, and Annabelle Toomey were cast in recurring roles for the second season. In February 2026, Jona Xiao joined the cast as a guest star for the second season. In March 2026, Lou Ferrigno Jr., David Fumero, Mary McCormack, Geoffrey Owens, and Wyle's real-life wife Sara Wyle were announced as guest stars for the second season. In April 2026, it was announced that Ganesh would exit as Dr. Samira Mohan following the second season, with Ayesha Harris promoted to a series regular for third season. In June 2026, Pruitt Taylor Vince, Malachi Beasley, Cheyenne Perez, Jeremy Radin, Charlz Williams, and Rosanny Zayas were cast in recurring capacities for the third season.

=== Sound design and music ===
Before writing the script, Gemmill, Wells, and Wyle decided to use almost no background music in The Pitt to complement its documentary style. Instead, Gemmill, Sachs, and Wells focused on crafting faithful sound design that could directly convey the emotional cues usually imbued in the music and set the pace of the scenes. It involved recording and layering background conversations and machinery sounds beneath each episode's dialogue track. The team used the sound of medical procedures and the dialogue itself to dictate the show's rhythm, relying on the varying intensity of the actors' delivery of medical jargon to relay emotional cues. For the background, Sachs recorded the discussions of real-life ER nurses and gave them to extras to register.

Nevertheless, The Pitt employs some musical motifs and drones composed by Gavin Brivik, intended to blur the line between diegetic and non-diegetic music. The team asked Brivik to create an imperceptible score to occasionally increase the tension of specific scenes throughout the series. Additionally, they meant to capture the sensation of Robby's tinnitus at times. The official album consisting of Brivik's score for the first season was released on January 9, 2026.

Instead of using an opening theme, each episode of The Pitt starts with a simple title card followed by onscreen text stating what hour of the shift it covers. The first season featured an instrumental closing song, "Fail Forward", written by Brivik and singer-songwriter Taji with the aim of expressing Robby's feelings and giving the viewers a moment to reflect on each episode. The vocal version of "Fail Forward" played during the credits of the thirteenth episode. Three other songs were featured in the first season: "Baby" by Robert Bradley's Blackwater Surprise, "Funky Music Sho' 'Nuff Turns Me On" by Edwin Starr, and "Savage" by Megan Thee Stallion.

The second season premiere opened with "Better Off Without You" by Pittsburgh band The Clarks. Brivik composed two new instrumental pieces for season 2, "We Are Back" and "Fourth of July", which alternately play over the closing credits of each episode. Additionally, Brivik and American singer-songwriter Andrew Bird collaborated on the song "Need Someone", which was written for the series and played at the end of the sixth episode of season 2.

=== Editing ===
Mark Strand, Joey Reinisch, Lauren Pendergrass, and Annie Eifrig served as editors on The Pitt. Strand and Eifrig had already worked with Wells on Animal Kingdom and Maid (2021), respectively. Reinisch and Pendergrass were recommended by members of the production team and interviewed for the job; Reinisch had already worked on projects developed by John Wells Productions. The production team wanted to distinguish The Pitt from other medical dramas. In particular, Strand said that Wyle referenced the 2023 film The Zone of Interest by Jonathan Glazer and its continuous motion through space and time. Reinisch stated that he avoided watching medical dramas through the process to not be influenced. Having joined the production later on, Pendergrass and Eifrig said that they followed the editing style established by Strand with the pilot episode, which was "aggressively off-camera". Strand wanted to highlight the emotional reactions of the characters rather than the medical jargon and procedures, describing the style as "medical off-camera, drama or emotion on-camera". The script allowed the editors to introduce characters progressively, first focusing on Robby and few others and then broadening to the full cast.

The editing team had some concerns at first. Pendergrass worried about mismatching scenes due to the large scope of the set and the amount of background action, but shooting in continuity minimized the issue. Reinisch remarked that the synchronized play-like background action allowed them to focus on the story, instead of having to resolve continuity issues. Strand and Pendergrass added that they did not order the sequences in exact chronological order, having some scenes that were happening simultaneously arranged differently. Strand worried that the real-time format would not allow them to build tension by frequently jump cutting through different scenes, but found that the script managed to maintain it while moving characters through space. Regarding the style, the production team invited the editors to use documentary-like "dirty cuts" to convey a sense of realism. Reinisch said he used "messy" frames to change the pace, facilitated by not having to match a score to the scenes.

For the action scenes, Strand and the team worked on balancing choreography, camerawork, and actor-blocking to best communicate the sense of continuous motion. Pendergrass and Reinisch found that the camerawork allowed the viewer to become familiar with the characters within the action scenes themselves by focusing on their expressions and reactions, making for an "economic storytelling". For the emotional scenes, Strand noted that they did not have to exceedingly slow down the pace to convey the pathos, due to the fast pace of action scenes providing contrast. Eifrig said that Wells directed them to cut down on emotional scenes to avoid exhausting the audience with excessive sentimentality. Sachs reviewed the sequences for medical accuracy and monitored background action. For the pilot episode, Strand also consulted with Tim Van Pelt and Ambar Martinez, real-life nurses that appeared in the series.

=== Lawsuit ===
In August 2024, the estate of Crichton, led by his widow, sued Warner Bros. Television, Gemmill, Wells, and Wyle over breach of contract, breach of implied covenant of good faith and fair dealing, and intentional interference with contractual relations, claiming that The Pitt was a reworking of a planned ER reboot that the estate had not approved. Additionally, Crichton's widow alleged that Warner Bros. Television had already tried to eliminate Crichton's name from their projects by refusing to credit him as creator on the television series Westworld (2016–2022). In November 2024, Warner Bros. Television's lawyers filed for a motion to dismiss the lawsuit, claiming that The Pitt is "a completely different show". In April 2025, Wyle stated that they "pivoted as far in the opposite direction as we could in order to tell the story we wanted to tell — and not for litigious reasons, but because we didn't want to retread our own creative work", after knowing that they could not produce a reboot. In November 2026, an appeals court ruled that the two series were similar enough that the lawsuit could proceed, but removed Gemmill, Wells, and Wyle as defendants, finding no evidence they were aware of Crichton's contractual rights.

== Episodes ==
Season	Episodes	Originally released		
Season	Episodes	First released	Last released	Network
1	15	January 9, 2025	April 10, 2025	Max
2	15	January 8, 2026	April 16, 2026	HBO Max
3	15	January 2027	TBA	HBO Max

=== Season 1 (2025) ===
No. overall	No. in season	Title	Directed by	Written by	Original release date	Prod. code
1	1	"7:00 A.M."	John Wells	R. Scott Gemmill	January 9, 2025	T76.10101
Attending Dr. Michael "Robby" Robinavitch starts a shift at the Pitt, relieving struggling overnight attending Dr. Jack Abbot and welcoming residents Dr. Trinity Santos and Dr. Melissa "Mel" King and medical students Victoria Javadi, daughter of a surgeon at the hospital, and Dennis Whitaker. Charge nurse Dana Evans discovers that senior resident Heather Collins is pregnant. The team treats Minu, a non-English speaking woman with a degloved foot from being pushed onto subway tracks, alongside her rescuer. Javadi faints at the sight of the foot. Afterwards, her mother, Dr. Eileen Shamsi, embarrasses her by visiting. Hospital administrator Gloria Underwood warns Robby that the Pitt must improve its patient satisfaction scores. Resident Dr. Cassie McKay treats a triathlete suffering shortness of breath who goes into cardiac arrest. Mel and senior resident Dr. Frank Langdon examine lethargic child Tyler Jones, discovering that he ingested one of his father's cannabis gummies. Whitaker injures his finger in a patient transfer. Collins manages to determine that Minu speaks Nepali. McKay and Robby meet Theresa, a mother who made herself ill to get help for her son David after finding a list of girls he planned to harm. David flees before Robby and social worker Kiara can learn his intentions. Robby has a flashback of working during the COVID-19 pandemic.
2	2	"8:00 A.M."	Amanda Marsalis	R. Scott Gemmill	January 9, 2025	T76.10102
The children of Mr. Spencer, an elderly man with Alzheimer's suffering from pneumonia and sepsis, decide to override his advance directive and DNR order and pursue treatment that could cause him further pain. Langdon scolds Santos for treating a patient without having presented the case to a superior. Mel successfully does a cricothyrotomy on a patient with a Le Fort III fracture. Javadi discovers that McKay wears an ankle monitor while assisting in triage. A homeless man arrives with a coat full of rats that subsequently escape in the ER, to Gloria's despair. Mel, Langdon, and Kiara have to handle Tyler's angry mother and ensure the intervention of child services. Theresa tries to contact David. Resident Samira Mohan recognizes that Joyce, a patient in crippling pain, is not seeking drugs, but suffering from sickle cell disease. Surgical resident Yolanda Garcia trusts Santos to assist her in a fasciotomy. Javadi clashes with Santos. Collins wants to go to the ethics committee and overrule Mr. Spencer's children, but Robby says he does not have enough time. Robby struggles to inform the parents of teenager Nick Bradley that their son is brain-dead due to a fentanyl overdose. He prescribes unnecessary tests to allow them more time to process his death.
3	3	"9:00 A.M."	Damian Marcano	Joe Sachs & R. Scott Gemmill	January 16, 2025	T76.10103
Javadi inquires about McKay's life. Whitaker struggles to process the death of Bennet Milton, a patient with whom he had connected. McKay and Javadi successfully treat Jenna, a patient experiencing an overdose after taking Xanax laced with fentanyl. Santos irritates her colleagues with her brash and overconfident personality. Collins trusts Javadi to intubate a patient that has been shot in the chest with a nail gun. Mel and Langdon treat a patient with a STEMI and perform a cardioversion on a man addicted to vaping. Robby scolds Mohan over her excessive focus on individual patients, leading to a slow work pace; he encourages her to be more confident in herself and overcome her fear of making a mistake. Nick's father recognizes his son's friend Jenna and angrily accuses her of having given the fentanyl to Nick before being removed by security. McKay and Kiara tell Robby to get David back to the ER by any means necessary. Robby reads a letter written by Abbot to the sister of a dead veteran that he treated in the night shift. Mohan encourages Whitaker to face his fears. Someone steals one of the hospital's ambulances. Mr. Spencer's children agree to withdraw treatment to lessen his suffering and allow for a less traumatic death.
4	4	"10:00 A.M."	Amanda Marsalis	Noah Wyle	January 23, 2025	T76.10104
Staff members place bets and follow updates on the stolen ambulance through the newscast. Robby extubates Mr. Spencer and comforts his children, suggesting that they perform a Hawaiian ritual, Ho'oponopono, taught to him by his mentor, Dr. Adamson. He has a flashback of Dr. Adamson's death in the Pitt during the pandemic. Mohan scolds Santos for her poor bedside manner with Jenna. Langdon also berates Santos when a patient almost dies after she ordered to use BPAP without first consulting a superior. Nurse Mateo Diaz experiences racist abuse from Doug Driscoll, a patient angry about the long time spent in the waiting room. Javadi sutures a patient's wound and corrects a misgendering error on her medical record. Mel and Mohan treat a baby with a hair tourniquet and diagnose a young girl with an imperforate hymen, offering support to her single father. Dana, Whitaker and other nurses struggle to administer an injection to a psychotic patient, Mr. Krakozhia, waiting for a bed in the psychiatric department. Jenna apologizes to Nick's parents and explains that they took the unprescribed Xanax to fall asleep after having drunk a lot of coffee during a study session. Collins prepares to administer a medication abortion prescribed by Abbot to seventeen-year-old Kristi.
5	5	"11:00 A.M."	John Cameron	Simran Baidwan	January 30, 2025	T76.10105
Santos argues with Langdon over patient Joseph Marino's treatment plan. She tries to report a faulty vial of lorazepam. Mohan and Robby coach Whitaker through his next patients. Jake, the son of Robby's ex-girlfriend with whom he has a familial bond, visits the Pitt to fetch two tickets for Pitt Fest from Robby. Collins's ultrasound measurements suggest that Kristi may be past the gestational limit for abortion, implying that Abbot may have falsified his data. Robby performs another ultrasound and records the gestational age as one day under the cutoff. McKay connects with Sherry, a struggling mother, by sharing her own life story. Mel tries to comfort Rita, the daughter of elderly patient Ginger Kitajima struggling with caregiver stress, and advises her to take a break. Rita goes to collect her car and does not return. Robby reprimands Mohan for her slowness. Javadi embarrasses Sherry with her insensitive manners, making her flee. McKay scolds and confronts Javadi for being judgemental and nosy. Langdon performs an impressive retrograde intubation guided by Robby, who later tells him that he has recommended him for a prestigious fellowship. Collins praises Mohan for her approach to patient care. Collins is about to administer the abortion medication when Kristi's mother arrives and forbids it.
6	6	"12:00 P.M."	Damian Marcano	Cynthia Adarkwa	February 6, 2025	T76.10106
Collins discovers that Kristi's supposed mother, who had initially accompanied her, was her aunt. Gloria warns Robby that she will entrust the Pitt to a corporate management firm if patient satisfaction scores do not improve. Santos drops a scalpel that stabs Garcia's foot while treating patient Silas Dunn. Collins, Langdon, and Javadi treat two frat boys responsible for the ambulance's theft after they crash it. Robby praises Mohan for her attentiveness and reminds the team to watch for patient satisfaction scores. Javadi's mother's overbearing behavior embarrasses her. Kiara and Dana comfort Mel and encourage her to talk with Ginger about her daughter's disappearance. Robby confirms to Nick's parents that he is brain-dead and introduces them to family support specialist Emma, but his mother storms out when asked about her son's consent to organ donation. Collins starts getting excited about her pregnancy after witnessing a patient's close relationship with his mother. Santos and Langdon inform Joseph that he had neurocysticercosis. McKay suggests reporting David to law enforcement, but Robby disagrees. Mel calls her autistic sister Becca. Kristi locks herself in the bathroom and refuses to leave without the abortion medication. Kristi's mother and aunt fight, shoving Collins when she tries to intervene.
7	7	"1:00 P.M."	Silver Tree	Valerie Chu	February 13, 2025	T76.10107
Robby complains to Gloria about overcrowding and understaffing. Mel's experience with her sister helps her connect with an autistic patient with an ankle sprain, with whom Langdon had struggled to communicate. Santos inquires after Langdon's suspicious behavior. Collins convinces Kristi's mother to let her get the abortion. Silas's wife confesses to Santos that she drugged him with progesterone to dull his sex drive, believing that he is molesting their daughter. Whitaker, Langdon, and Robby call in the ECMO team for assistance in treating a patient with a STEMI. Mohan and Javadi treat Nandi, a beauty influencer with suspected schizophrenia, but Mohan keeps investigating her symptoms. Minu's rescuer says he will give a statement to law enforcement. Santos unsuccessfully tries to get Silas's daughter to acknowledge the abuse. Robby reprimands Mohan for conducting unnecessary tests, while Collins encourages her. Mohan discovers that Nandi used a contaminated face cream that led to mercury poisoning. Robby has a flashback of Adamson being supported by ECMO. Collins and Robby argue over his treatment of Mohan and the staff. Robby and Kiara inform Silas's wife that they must report her to the police for drugging her husband, to Santos's despair. Langdon praises Mel's skills. Santos threatens the incapacitated Silas. Collins suffers a miscarriage in the bathroom.
8	8	"2:00 P.M."	Amanda Marsalis	Joe Sachs	February 20, 2025	T76.10108
Collins immediately returns to work. Santos investigates Langdon's handling of lorazepam and Librium that he prescribed to regular patient Louie Cloverfield. Rita returns to the ER, having fallen asleep in the car. A patient with a severed finger flirts with Collins. Langdon treats Willie Alexander, a patient with Twiddler's syndrome and a former paramedic with the Freedom House Ambulance Service. Mel and Kiara help Rita and Ginger access homecare services. The team fails to save Amber, a six-year-old drowning victim. Javadi impresses her mother by determining that one of her patients' symptoms were caused by a spider bite, rather than her Crohn's disease. Nick's parents agree to organ donation. Santos shares her concerns about Langdon with Garcia, who dismisses them. McKay believes Piper, a young woman with chlamydia, may be a victim of sex trafficking by her overly-controlling boss. Mohan supports Nandi in her recovery. McKay and Dana get Piper alone with an excuse and try to get her to confess. Mel struggles to prepare Bella, Amber's sister, to receive the news. Robby informs Willie of Adamson's death after he reveals they had worked together. The staff and Nick's friends and family hold an honor walk as he and his parents leave the hospital.
9	9	"3:00 P.M."	Quyen Tran	Noah Wyle	February 27, 2025	T76.10109
Collins confides in Dana. Robby asks Dana about Collins's well-being and tries to console the team after Amber's death. Two women are admitted after beginning a fight in the waiting room. McKay and Dana fail to get Piper to confess before she leaves. Santos and Mohan treat a patient seizing from an MDMA overdose without a superior's approval, enraging Langdon and causing him to launch into an aggressive and targeted verbal attack on Santos. Robby lectures Langdon on his behavior. Whitaker receives an apology from homeless patient Krakozhia, who had urinated on him during a psychotic episode. Langdon reassures Mel. Javadi becomes infatuated with Mateo. Doug complains to Dana about the long wait time, threatens staff, and leaves against medical advice. Two victims of a car crash are admitted, including Paula, a patient who had been seen by McKay earlier in the day. Collins, McKay, and Robby discover that Paula had blacked out while driving due to sepsis caused by endometritis. Whitaker decides to join the Pitt's "street team" to personally administer Mr. Krakozhia's medication. Collins suggests that McKay may have missed the sepsis in Paula's earlier exam due to fatphobia. Whitaker catches one of the rats. Doug punches Dana in the ambulance bay.
10	10	"4:00 P.M."	Damian Marcano	Simran Baidwan	March 6, 2025	T76.10110
Law enforcement arrive to talk to Theresa. Robby treats Dana. Whitaker reassures the wife of a whole-body burn victim in critical condition, but Langdon has a pessimistic outlook on the patient's condition. McKay's son Harrison arrives at the ER alongside his father, her ex-partner Chad, who has been injured in a skateboarding accident. Robby chastises McKay for informing the police about David's possible intentions, but she remains convinced that she did the right thing. Gloria unsuccessfully tries to reassure the nursing team after Dana's assault. Tensions continue between Santos and Langdon, with Robby struggling to mediate. Javadi becomes angry with the father of a teenager who was hit in the eye by a baseball, feeling he is prioritizing his son's baseball career over his health concerns. Mel and Mohan speak about what it takes to be a doctor while treating a stroke victim with TNK. After Santos tells Robby her concerns about Langdon, Robby investigates his locker and finds several stolen doses. Livid, Robby sends Langdon home.
11	11	"5:00 P.M."	Quyen Tran	Elyssa Gershman	March 13, 2025	T76.10111
Dana keeps working despite the injury. Robby asks her to conduct a pharmacy audit on Langdon and has a flashback. David posts worrying messages on Instagram. Collins and Mel help a surrogate mother with delivery and treat her when complications arise. After an initial disagreement, Whitaker and Mohan treat a man asking for morphine by giving him buprenorphine without his knowledge. McKay and Javadi treat a former drug addict with hepatitis B experiencing an esophageal bleeding by using a Sengstaken–Blakemore tube. Santos shares with Garcia and Robby her concerns about the repercussions of reporting Langdon, but Robby reassures her. Robby repeatedly refuses to answer phone calls from Langdon. Jake and his girlfriend Leah call Robby from Pitt Fest to thank him for the tickets. Collins opens up to Robby about her miscarriage and an abortion that she had kept secret. He tells her to go home and rest. McKay confronts Chloe over custody of her son. Robby and Kiara support Theresa's petition for David to be placed under a psychiatric hold. Dana tells Robby that she will quit. The team are informed that there is an active shooter at Pitt Fest.
12	12	"6:00 P.M."	Amanda Marsalis	Joe Sachs & R. Scott Gemmill	March 20, 2025	T76.10112
Dana and Robby repeatedly call Jake without avail. Abbot starts his shift early along with senior resident Dr. Parker Ellis, attending Dr. John Shen, and surgeon Dr. Emery Walsh. Shamsi, Garcia, and doctors from other departments assist the ER. The hospital activates its mass casualty incident protocols to deal with the influx of patients from the shooting. Abbot, Shen, Walsh, and Dana act as primary supervisors for emergency, triage, surgery, and nursing personnel, respectively. All the people in the waiting room are dismissed. Abbot, Mohan, and Robby are assigned to critical patients; McKay and Javadi to patients that will die within an hour if left untreated; Mel, Whitaker, and Santos to patients with extremity wounds. Mel discovers a liver laceration in Sylvia, a patient with a broken leg. Langdon returns to help. Chad and Harrison wait in the lounge. Santos catches a journalist that faked an injury to enter the ER. The team begins to run out of supplies. Mel donates her blood to Sylvia, inspiring other doctors to donate their own. Javadi surprises her mother by improvising a substitute chest tube. Law enforcement inform the team that the shooter might head their way. David's phone is traced to the area of the shooting. After an hour, patients continue to arrive steadily.
13	13	"7:00 P.M."	Damian Marcano	Joe Sachs & R. Scott Gemmill	March 27, 2025	T76.10113
Whole blood supplies arrive by helicopter. The staff continues to use unorthodox procedures and equipment to treat patients. Intraosseous infusion drills see many uses: Whitaker erroneously uses one to administer medication to a conscious patient; Mohan uses one to relieve a patient's high intracranial pressure; and McKay uses it to disable her ankle monitor's distracting alarm sound. Kiara and ward clerk Lupe photograph the dead in order to identify them and notify their families. A patient tries to reach for his gun, causing fleeting panic in the staff before falling unconscious. Mel and Whitaker struggle to find equipment to treat a patient. Kiara and Lupe inform Whitney Rivera that her husband died; she asks about her brother, who is missing. Jake arrives with Leah in critical condition. Robby uses several liters of blood to treat Leah despite Abbot's protests, but he fails to save her. Santos performs an unsupervised REBOA to stop a patient's bleeding. Abbot scolds her for her rashness but praises her for the procedure's success. Law enforcement arrest David upon his return to the Pitt. Robby accompanies Jake to view Leah's body and Jake questions Robby as to why he could not save her. Robby has a panic attack, feeling overwhelmed by grief and guilt over Leah, Adamson, and other dead patients.
14	14	"8:00 P.M."	John Cameron	Simran Baidwan	April 3, 2025	T76.10114
The team searches for Robby; Whitaker finds him and reminds him of his responsibilities. Robby returns to work but acts short-tempered with his patients and colleagues. The Pitt begins to transition back to normal operations. McKay's father arrives to bring Harrison home. Langdon and Santos struggle to collaborate when treating Max, a patient suffering due to an overdose. Rivera's brother arrives to the ER, having developed an air embolism while helping other victims at the festival. Ignoring Walsh's objections, Mohan performs a risky procedure to save him, guided by Abbot. The shooter is reported dead. The team began treating Flynn, an unresponsive minor with measles and possible acute disseminated encephalomyelitis; Robby reports a potential outbreak to the Public Health Service. The police release David, but he is still placed on a 72-hour psychiatric hold, leading him to clash with his mother, Robby, and McKay. Jake's mother arrives to see him. Mel reunites a traumatized patient with her daughter, causing her to cry. Robby becomes enraged with Flynn's mother, who is refusing to allow a lumbar puncture after reading alarmist health information on the Internet. Abbot asks Dana about Robby's well being. The police arrest McKay for destroying her ankle monitor.
15	15	"9:00 P.M."	John Wells	R. Scott Gemmill	April 10, 2025	T76.10115
Robby talks the police into releasing McKay, citing her heroic work that day. Santos deduces that Max attempted suicide and opens up to him about a friend who killed herself. McKay attempts to persuade David to accept counseling. Langdon begs Robby for a second chance, but the conversation devolves into an argument. A hospital employee is admitted with a crushed pelvis; Robby has difficulty focusing on his treatment. Robby guilt-trips Flynn's father into allowing the lumbar puncture without his wife's knowledge by showing him the bodies of PittFest victims. Mohan's manic energy wears off, and she cries in the bathroom. Robby gives a speech thanking the day-shift staff and dismisses them. Dana takes down photos from her desk, contemplating not returning to the Pitt. Mel picks up her sister at a care facility. Santos discovers Whitaker is homeless and squatting in a room in the hospital, so she invites him to live in her apartment. Abbot finds Robby at the edge of the hospital roof and emotionally exhorts him not to feel like a failure; the two then join several other doctors and nurses for a beer in the park before Robby finally heads home.

=== Season 2 (2026) ===
No. overall	No. in season	Title	Directed by	Written by	Original release date	Prod. code
16	1	"7:00 A.M."	John Wells	R. Scott Gemmill	January 8, 2026	T76.10201
On July 4, Robby begins his last shift before a planned three-month sabbatical he intends to spend taking a cross-country motorcycle trip, with Baran Al-Hashimi set to serve as interim senior attending. Al-Hashimi promotes the use of AI-driven medical tools and tests them while supervising a procedure with Robby, Whitaker, and Mohan, assisted by new medical students James Ogilvie and Joy Kwon. Langdon returns from rehab but is kept at a distance by Robby, who assigns him to triage. He treats regular patient Louie Cloverfield and admits to stealing his Librium, but Louie brushes it off. Ethan Bostick, a 79-year-old patient with a POLST, is allowed to die in accordance with his wishes under Whitaker's guidance. Mel reveals she has been named in a malpractice lawsuit and must attend a deposition. Santos treats Kylie Connors, a girl who fell down the stairs, and becomes concerned about possible child abuse after noting multiple bruises and red-colored urine indicating hematuria. Dana begins her shift mentoring new nurse Emma Nolan as they respond to an abandoned baby and care for a homeless man, Digby. McKay treats patient Michael Williams for a wrist injury, but his confusion and erratic behavior suggests a more serious condition. Al-Hashimi later freezes upon receiving the abandoned baby's test results.
17	2	"8:00 A.M."	Damian Marcano	Joe Sachs & R. Scott Gemmill	January 15, 2026	T76.10202
The abandoned baby undergoes further testing to confirm it is healthy, though Al-Hashimi does not explain what left her shaken; staff collect a urine sample and contact police. Allen Billings arrives with a severe fall injury, and Mel assists Robby in reducing his exposed bone. Mel confides in Robby about her malpractice deposition, which he reassures her is routine. Mel is knocked down when a flirtatious patient she is treating flees upon seeing police; she later learns the man is a robbery suspect. Langdon treats her injuries and admits to his drug addiction, which she accepts without judgment. Santos contacts Kylie's father, while Javadi treats a nun named Grace Matthews, diagnosing a gram-negative bacterial infection. McKay is denied further tests on Allen when Robby and case manager Noelle Hastings determine he lacks adequate insurance and must be transferred. McKay also saves another patient by removing broccoli obstructing his airway. Whitaker assigns Ogilvie and Kwon to Louie before informing Evelyn Bostick of her husband's death and later noting her memory loss. Al-Hashimi demonstrates a new AI charting app, though Whitaker identifies a medication error. Outside, Al-Hashimi and Robby debate the role of AI in medicine, until a college student arrives in psychosis.
18	3	"9:00 A.M."	Uta Briesewitz	Noah Wyle	January 22, 2026	T76.10203
College student Jackson Davis is brought to the Pitt during an apparent psychotic breakdown, while campus security guard Tony Chinchiolo arrives with a head injury after being struck by a chair thrown by Jackson and insists on staying to speak with police; after toxicology reports show no drugs in Jackson's system, the police determine Tony prematurely tased him. Robby and Al-Hashimi treat Mark Yee following a severe motorcycle accident; tests suggest hypokalemic periodic paralysis, and while Mark later regains consciousness, his wife Nancy collapses and is found to have internal bleeding. Kylie's father Benny arrives and clashes with his girlfriend and staff over suspicions of abuse, but Dana reveals Kylie's bruising is due to immune thrombocytopenic purpura, leading Santos to begin steroid treatment requiring Kylie to be hospitalized. Benny and his girlfriend separate after having an argument. Robby treats Yana, a burn victim whose PTSD from the Pittsburgh synagogue shooting is triggered by fireworks. McKay learns Michael Williams has a frontal lobe mass and contacts his ex-wife to discuss care. As the ER stabilizes, Dana learns nearby Westbridge Hospital has issued a code black, diverting all ambulances to the Pitt.
19	4	"10:00 A.M."	John Cameron	Cynthia Adarkwa	January 29, 2026	T76.10204
As the ER prepares for diverted cases from Westbridge, Robby keeps Langdon in triage and assigns Whitaker, Santos, and Javadi to the first arrivals while treating Vince Cole, a young man injured after falling through a skylight while attempting parkour. During treatment, Joy cuts her finger on embedded glass, requiring HIV and hepatitis testing, but Emma accidentally drops and destroys the blood vial. Ogilvie removes a large shard from Vince's back, causing severe bleeding that Robby, McKay, and Garcia control, ultimately saving Vince; Robby later warns Ogilvie to leave deeply embedded objects to surgeons. Whitaker saves his patient Mr. Samba from a heart attack by identifying a posterior STEMI and later treats Louie's toothache. Langdon treats Willow, who accidentally glued her eye shut; she asks for "Dr. J", revealed to be Javadi, now a TikTok star. McKay manually resets an elderly man's fractured tailbone and agrees to a date with another patient. Mohan counsels the uninsured Diaz family on coverage options. Santos and Mel place a bulimic patient into treatment; Santos faces pressure from Al-Hashimi over charting. Al-Hashimi takes Langdon off of triage. Langdon suspects that returning cellulitis patient Debbie Cohen has MRSA or worse.
20	5	"11:00 A.M."	Damian Marcano	Simran Baidwan	February 5, 2026	T76.10205
Langdon and Donnie move Debbie to Trauma Two for further evaluation, with Robby suggesting her condition may be related to SIRS. Additional tests reveal she is developing severe sepsis, which Langdon believes is treatable, but Robby removes him from the case and privately instructs nurse Jesse to prepare for possible intubation as Debbie's oxygen levels fall. Gus Varney, an inmate from SCI Jones Forge, is brought in after being assaulted, but his guard refuses to remove his restraints, complicating Whitaker and Mel's efforts to treat his wounds. Santos struggles to complete charting amid constant interruptions and shares duties with Ogilvie, who evaluates a homeless woman later diagnosed with tuberculosis; Santos determines Ogilvie was not infected but stresses occupational risk. Whitaker helps Ogilvie perform a fecal disimpaction on an elderly woman. Noelle advises Orlando Diaz's family on cost-reduction options, ultimately securing a treatment plan that significantly lowers expenses thanks to Joy's suggestion to move him to a medical-surgical floor. Debbie's condition is discovered to be necrotizing fasciitis, placing her life at risk. McKay and Javadi treat Roxie Hamler, a woman with advanced cancer. Louie suddenly flatlines, prompting Robby and Langdon to attempt resuscitation as they await an intubation tray.
21	6	"12:00 P.M."	Noah Wyle	Valerie Chu	February 12, 2026	T76.10206
Louie suffers a pulmonary hemorrhage due to liver failure and dies despite attempts by Robby, Langdon, and the nursing staff to resuscitate him. Langdon finds a photograph of an unknown woman among Louie's belongings and learns that his listed emergency contact is the hospital itself. With Perlah shaken by Louie's death, Dana instructs Emma on preparing Louie's body for viewing. Brandon Li is admitted after a motorcycle accident, while Jackson experiences another psychotic episode, which Dr. Caleb Jefferson, a psychiatrist, manages with droperidol. Al-Hashimi recommends admitting Gus after a CT scan reveals vitamin deficiencies linked to prison malnutrition, but Robby worries about bed shortages; Dana later manipulates Gus's pulse oximeter readings to ensure his admission. Dana and Langdon discuss the latter's rehabilitation and twelve-step recovery, with Dana forgiving him. Santos faces communication barriers treating a deaf patient due to the ASL interpreter needing to leave, and is later reprimanded after relying on Al-Hashimi's AI tool without proofreading. Roxie requests continued hospitalization due to worsening pain. Staff gather to honor Louie, and Robby reveals Louie's wife and unborn child died in a car accident, leading to his alcoholism; with no family present, Emma holds his hand as everyone pays their respects.
22	7	"1:00 P.M."	Uta Briesewitz	Kirsten Pierre-Geyfman & R. Scott Gemmill	February 19, 2026	T76.10207
After honoring Louie, the staff resume work. Dana and Emma collect evidence for a rape kit from sexual assault victim Ilana Miller; during a pap test, Ilana becomes hesitant about reporting her assault. Santos attempts to communicate with deaf patient Harlow Graham using video remote interpreting, but connectivity issues force her to rely on written communication while arranging a CT scan. Jackson's parents arrive seeking to take him home; Jefferson inquires about the family's psychiatric history and learns that Jackson's uncle committed suicide, upsetting Jackson's sister Jada. Abbot, while working as a SWAT medic, brings in Officer Hiro, who was shot preventing a robbery; a missed bruise reveals a splenic injury requiring surgery. Langdon apologizes to Robby, but Robby tells him he is unsure if he wants him working in his ER; this hurts Langdon's confidence and focus while he and Robby tend to a patient severely injured by a boat propeller. Mohan persuades Orlando to stay despite his undisclosed debt, but he later leaves; Abbot offers to fund delivery of medical supplies. Santos calms the abandoned baby by singing in Hiligaynon. Hospital CEO Trent Norris arrives to announce a regional cyberattack involving a ransom, forcing the hospital to shut down its computer systems.
23	8	"2:00 P.M."	John Cameron	Joe Sachs	February 26, 2026	T76.10208
Whitaker is unable to take a legible picture of the patient board as it goes offline, but Joy recreates it using her photographic memory. The younger staff struggles to adapt to analog procedures. Princess continues as acting charge nurse while Dana finishes collecting Ilana's DNA. Dana is enraged to find a rape kit that the police failed to pick up for two weeks. Santos realizes that Harlow's diagnosis is simpler than she realized. Ogilvie is chastised by McKay and Whitaker for his insensitive remarks about Howard Knox, an obese patient. Javadi introduces Jackson's parents to Nicole Steadman, a parent support advocate, to help them come to terms with his apparent mental illness. Al-Hashimi encourages Samira to go into geriatrics. Dr. Parker Ellis gives Mel a pep talk on her impending deposition, revealing the lawsuit pertains to the spinal tap they performed on Flynn, the child with measles. Santos and Langdon are tense as they work on Jackie Liddell, a patient who drunkenly bit her own tongue. McKay commiserates with Langdon on their shared sobriety. Ogilvie and Javadi compete over and nearly misdiagnose a patient before Joy correctly identifies phytophotodermatitis. Robby and Dana wonder how they will get through the shutdown.
24	9	"3:00 P.M."	Shawn Hatosy	Cynthia Adarkwa	March 5, 2026	T76.10209
Santos and Robby treat Jude Augustin, a 12-year-old who lost two fingers in a firecracker accident; his sister Chantal reveals their parents were deported to Haiti, leaving her to raise him, raising concerns about child services. Javadi nearly causes a fatal oversight when she forgets to place patient Claire Burns on the whiteboard, delaying treatment for a sigmoid volvulus until emergency surgery is required, drawing sharp criticism from Garcia. Mel struggles with anxiety ahead of her malpractice deposition when her autistic sister Becca arrives with abdominal pain, which Langdon later diagnoses as a urinary tract infection. McKay and Whitaker treat Amaya, a patient with polyendocrine metabolic ovarian syndrome, whose worsening pain leads to the discovery of ovarian torsion requiring surgery. McKay has a tender moment with Roxie. Abbot returns with Howard, whose perforated diverticular abscess requires high-risk surgery to save his life. Robby lets Whitaker house-sit for him while he is on his sabbatical. Dana calls in a favor from Monica Peters, a retired clerk who arrives to help manage the hospital's mounting paperwork. News breaks that a nearby water-park slide collapse may send a mass-casualty event to the already strained hospital.
25	10	"4:00 P.M."	Damian Marcano	Simran Baidwan	March 12, 2026	T76.10210
Victims of the waterslide collapse include a woman whose lower leg has been severed and a child with a crushed larynx, whom Dr. Al-Hashimi saves with an emergency slash tracheotomy; orthopedic surgeon Dr. Brendon Park later approves reattaching the woman’s leg. Javadi, reeling from her earlier mistake, is reprimanded by her mother, Dr. Shamsi, who derides ER work as "street-level medicine". Mohan suffers a panic attack triggered by conflict with her mother; Robby harshly mocks and dismisses her issues, prompting Al-Hashimi to criticize his lack of empathy. Robby later apologizes to Mohan. While treating a man injured on the waterslide, Santos' belligerent attitude toward Langdon is rebuked by both Al-Hashimi and Garcia. When Santos later protests she is being shunned for exposing Langdon's addiction, Garcia suggests the staff are just tired of her abrasiveness. Returning from her deposition, Mel is shocked when Becca admits that she has a boyfriend and is sexually active, which is what likely caused her UTI. Robby's motorcyclist friend Duke arrives; both he and Whitaker express concern that Robby intends to ride off immediately after his shift ends. Roxie's condition worsens; McKay administers morphine to let her die peacefully while her family gathers at her bedside.
26	11	"5:00 P.M."	Uta Briesewitz	Valerie Chu	March 19, 2026	T76.10211
McKay and Ogilvie treat a homeless woman with a severe xylazine wound outdoors, causing McKay to miss Roxie's death. Ogilvie and Mohan miss patient Austin Green's abdominal aortic aneurysm; when it ruptures, Shamsi performs emergency surgery with Javadi's assistance, while Ogilvie admits to his mistake. Mohan takes responsibility for the oversight, but Robby criticizes her leadership and questions her ability to separate personal issues from work. ICE agents arrive with an injured detainee, Pranita, causing patients and staff to flee in fear; when nurse Jesse intervenes during her removal, he is arrested. Staff treat a boy who suffered heat stroke after falling asleep inside a car; his mother, feeling guilty, attempts suicide in traffic, but Al-Hashimi stops her. Mel feels distressed over Becca's growing independence and sexual relationship, later admitting to Dana her anxiety stems from loneliness and resentment. Duke's X-ray detects an enlarged mediastinum; Robby delays his sabbatical until a CT scan provides results. Langdon apologizes to Santos for his past conduct, but she rejects it and insists true accountability would involve publicly admitting to stealing drugs from the hospital; Al-Hashimi overhears their confrontation. Emma treats golfer Curtis Larson, who awakens from sedation and puts her in a chokehold.
27	12	"6:00 P.M."	Amanda Marsalis	Danny Hogan & R. Scott Gemmill	March 26, 2026	T76.10212
Dana saves Emma from Larson by subduing him with Versed she had been carrying, though she refuses to fully explain what happened. Robby warns her she could lose her nursing license for both the use of force and administering a controlled substance outside protocol. Tests reveal that a combination of alcohol and cocaine sent Larson into a psychotic state. Having witnessed the confrontation between Langdon and Santos, Al-Hashimi tells Robby she intends to staff the ER with two attendings at all times; after finding out that Langdon stole drugs from the ER, she starts to treat him coldly. As Robby delays leaving for his sabbatical until Duke's CT results return, both Dana and McKay express concern over his erratic behavior and warn him that he seems to be courting death. Mohan and Mel treat an elderly couple after a driveway accident and determine the husband's symptoms were caused by unnecessary medications; Mohan comes up with a way for the couple to get the help they need while still living at home. A struggling Santos takes scalpel kits, suggesting a potential relapse into self-harm. Al-Hashimi informs Robby that the ransomware payment has been made and the systems should be back online soon. As the night shift arrives, Robby prepares to leave, but Orlando arrives after having suffered a fall.
28	13	"7:00 P.M."	Damian Marcano	Joe Sachs	April 2, 2026	T76.10213
Orlando suffers a basilar skull fracture and possible severe brain damage; Javadi assists chief neurosurgeon Dr. Linda Conley in placing an EVD. Mohan is shaken by Orlando's condition and is further devastated when his wife reveals she never knew he had left the hospital. Robby grows concerned after Al-Hashimi dissociates when she examines a teenage asthma patient; Dr. Crus Henderson prevents Langdon from fatally intubating him by diagnosing a pneumothorax. Mel consoles Langdon's subsequent self-doubt. McKay and Santos diagnose a jaundiced woman with turmeric overdose while Dana and Emma give Digby a shave and haircut. Santos finds out from the restored computer system that Austin Green died in surgery, worsening Mohan's guilt and leaving Ogilvie emotionally shattered in the ambulance bay until Whitaker encourages him to go home and rest. Robby becomes agitated upon learning that Duke has an ascending thoracic aortic aneurysm, and later speculates that Orlando's fall was a suicide attempt driven by medical debt. As Robby continues delaying his departure, Dana confronts him over his treatment of the staff and urges him to leave, but Robby asks, "What if I don't come back?"
29	14	"8:00 P.M."	Uta Briesewitz	Noah Wyle	April 9, 2026	T76.10214
Robby informs Duke about his surgery and aftercare procedures. Dana tearfully urges Abbot to talk Robby out of hurting himself. Jefferson admonishes Robby for suggesting to Mohan that Orlando attempted suicide. Langdon's confidence returns after Robby encourages him to perform a closed reduction of facet joint to free the airway of a traffic-accident victim, with no neurosurgeons available to do the procedure. Langdon then rushes to submit a mandated urine screening test. Staff treat two men who maimed each other in a bar fight, and an elderly man with a severe hand laceration from playing tug of war with his family. Whitaker loses his badge. Duke helps fix up Robby's motorcycle after it is accidentally knocked over by an ambulance; Robby then confides in Duke that his sabbatical is an attempt to escape his suicidal thoughts, from which the hospital provides the only distraction. Robby criticizes two male paramedics after they miss a STEMI in a middle-aged woman, having incorrectly placed EKG leads due to their reluctance to touch her breasts. Al-Hashimi asks for Robby's opinion on a case involving a woman's history of seizure disorder following a childhood viral meningitis infection; Robby realizes the case is her own.
30	15	"9:00 P.M."	John Wells	R. Scott Gemmill	April 16, 2026	T76.10215
Al-Hashimi reveals to Robby that her seizures, previously believed to be under control, have returned; Robby tells her that she must disclose the condition and cannot continue working until it is managed, prompting her to later have an emotional breakdown in private. Robby and Abbot treat Judith Lastrade, a woman suffering from severe preeclampsia and HELLP syndrome after attempting a freebirth. They perform an emergency C-section to save both mother and child. Digby departs with Whitaker's missing badge and a medical training dummy. Santos invites Mel on a night out to destress. Langdon learns that Debbie survived but required an above-the-knee amputation. Whitaker agrees to house-sit for Robby; Amy Miller arrives to pick Whitaker up and they drive off together. Javadi considers a career in emergency psychiatry, while Mohan remains uncertain about her future; Robby wishes them both well. Many staff members gather to watch the fireworks. Abbot and Langdon each urge Robby to seek help: Abbot reminds him that their work still has value despite the death they witness and advises him to choose a safer trip. Holding the abandoned baby, who Dana has been trying to find someone to foster, Robby bonds with the child and reassures her, and himself, that everything will be okay. In a mid-credits scene, Mel and Santos sing Alanis Morissette's "You Oughta Know" at a karaoke bar together.

=== Season 3 ===
No. overall	No. in season	Title	Directed by	Written by	Original release date	Prod. code
31	1	"6:00 A.M."	TBD	R. Scott Gemmill & Joe Sachs	January 2027	TBA
32	2	"7:00 A.M."	TBA	R. Scott Gemmill & Joe Sachs	TBA	TBA
33	3	"8:00 A.M."	TBA	Noah Wyle	TBA	TBA
34	4	"9:00 A.M."	TBA	Simran Baidwan	TBA	TBA
35	5	"10:00 A.M."	TBA	Elyssa Gershman	TBA	TBA
36	6	"11:00 A.M."	TBA	Cynthia Adarkwa	TBA	TBA
37	7	"12:00 P.M."	TBA	Kristen Pierre-Geyfman	TBA	TBA
38	8	"1:00 P.M."	TBA	Valerie Chu	TBA	TBA
39	9	"2:00 P.M."	TBA	Eli Attie	TBA	TBA
40	10	"3:00 P.M."	TBA	Danny Hogan	TBA	TBA

== Release ==
Bloys wanted to promote The Pitt by applying a network-style marketing strategy. He chose to use the model of appointment television, having the episodes be released each week on the same day at the same hour during prime time instead of launching them in the middle of the night—a standard practice for streaming services. The first two episodes premiered on Max at 9 p.m. on January 9, 2025, followed by a weekly release of the remaining thirteen episodes through April 10. Each episode runs for 41 to 61 minutes. The first episode was screened for healthcare and emergency medical services (EMS) providers at Allegheny General Hospital on January 10, 2025, followed by a discussion with Hissrich and Wyle.

Ahead of the release of the second season, the series was broadcast on the cable network channel TNT on December 1, 2025, with three episodes airing back-to-back per week through December 29. The second season premiered on January 8, 2026, followed by a weekly release through April 16.

== Reception ==
=== Audience viewership ===
The premiere of The Pitt ranked among the top five most-watched Max series debuts. According to Nielsen, each episode averaged 6.18 million viewers within its first 35 days of release. Warner Bros. Discovery reported consistent week-to-week growth in viewership, with the first 14 episodes reaching an average of 10 million viewers per episode by April. After its initial run, the series achieved the highest post-season viewership growth for a debut season of any HBO series, averaging an 80% audience increase and amassing more than 18 million viewers per episode. Following its wins at the 77th Primetime Emmy Awards, global viewership nearly tripled compared to the prior week, marking the series's best ratings week since its finale, with a 142% increase in US audiences.

Warner Bros. Discovery stated that the premiere of the second season drew 5.4 million US viewers within its first three days, marking a 200% increase over the first season's premiere. Two weeks before the season finale, The Pitt topped Nielsen's ranking for the most-watched streaming series for the week of March 30–April 5, 2026. Nielsen also reported that viewership for the second season grew compared to the first over the same period, with each episode averaging 13.45 million viewers within its first 35 days of release. Warner Bros. Discovery stated that viewership for each episode reached an average of 15.4 million viewers within its first 90 days, marking a 50% increase over the first season, with the finale peaking at 9.7 million viewers in its opening weekend. TheWrap attributed the series's viewership increase for the second season to its consistent weekly release schedule, which allowed "fans space to convene weekly in the wake of a new episode as well as a more approachable midseason entry point for first-time watchers".

=== Critical response ===
Critical response of The Pitt
Season	Rotten Tomatoes	Metacritic
1	94% (89 reviews)	78 (32 reviews)
2	99% (211 reviews)	92 (32 reviews)

==== Season 1 ====
The review aggregator website Rotten Tomatoes reported a 94% approval rating for the first season based on 89 critic reviews with an average rating of 8.6/10. The website's critics consensus reads, "Setting the trials and tribulations of hospital life on a timer, The Pitt combines multiple tried-and-true formulas to create a bracingly fresh medical drama." Metacritic, which uses a weighted average, assigned a score of 78 out of 100 based on 32 critics, indicating "generally favorable" reviews.

Phillip Maciak of The New Republic praised the contrasting pacing of the show's plotlines. Reviewing the series for Chicago Tribune, Nina Metz gave a rating of 3.5/4 and wrote, "From a viewer's perspective, if you've seen one hospital drama, you've seen them all. What distinguishes one show from another is whether the writing and casting is any good. And The Pitt lands enough on both fronts to make it essential viewing." Linda Holmes of NPR described it as "a very sharp season of television with outstanding performances across the board." Brian Farvour of The Playlist gave the series an A+ and said, "The Pitt stands out entirely independently, separate from its pseudo-ancestor in ER and as a bonafide triumph in storytelling, chemistry and television." David Sims of The Atlantic commented, "It's already without question the finest example of the genre in more than a generation."

==== Season 2 ====
On Rotten Tomatoes, the second season has a 99% approval rating, based on 211 critic reviews with an average rating of 8.5/10. The website's critics consensus states, "Clocking in for a second season of a near perfect medical procedural, The Pitt goes all in on narrative excellence, brilliant humanity, and heart-wrenching drama to winning effect." On Metacritic, it has a weighted average score of 92 out of 100 based on 32 critics, indicating "universal acclaim".

For the second season, Time's Judy Berman wrote, "The Pitt isn't just lionizing its central characters; it's also laying the groundwork for conversations that give dimension to lives that have more in common with viewers' own than we might like to admit."

=== Medical community response ===
The Pitt has received praise from the medical community for its accurate and comprehensive depiction of the challenges faced by workers in the American healthcare system. Several healthcare professionals found certain scenes triggering and difficult to watch for their realistic approach. In particular, they referenced the flashbacks to the pandemic and a scene where the cries of a grieving mother are heard throughout the ER. Some members of EMS said the series led them to confront the emotional weight of their profession. Other professionals have enjoyed watching The Pitt with their families to show them their daily routines, since physicians are not allowed to have family members visit them at work due to HIPAA and patient confidentiality rules. Dr. Nicholas Cozzi, director of EMS at Rush University Medical Center, felt moved by its sympathetic portrayal of doctors trying to work in "a system that is unwell itself—stretched thin, underfunded, and unable to keep pace". Healthcare workers in Canada have also found The Pitt accurate and relatable despite systemic differences.

Several physicians have described the technical scenes as mostly realistic, and how The Pitt manages to capture the frenetic atmosphere of hospitals and touch on issues such as nursing shortages, insufficient resources, violence against healthcare professionals, health misinformation, and their consequent psychological impact on workers. Amanda Choflet, dean of Northeastern University School of Nursing, appreciated the series' inclusion of themes related to mental health and substance abuse issues in healthcare providers. Dr. Lukas Ramcharran, an attending physician and assistant professor in the department of emergency medicine at Johns Hopkins Hospital, said that the character of Robby represented correctly the life of an attending physician at a teaching hospital, balancing the education of residents with the practice of medicine. Angela Hosking, dean of Northeastern University's Charlotte campus, appreciated the series' portrayal of the ER nurses' level of expertise and alertness, criticizing other medical series' tendency to show nurses as "glorified assistants". Dr. Lois K. Lee, an associate professor of pediatrics in the department of emergency medicine at Boston Children's Hospital, described as fairly accurate the implementation of MCI protocols, having herself experienced them during the bombing at the Boston Marathon in 2013. Ramcharran and Lee appreciated the use of real-time narration, saying that the format allowed the writers to explore a wide range of human emotions and experiences while keeping the focus on the events inside of the ER.

Healthcare workers have also criticized aspects of The Pitt: the improbably high number of complex trauma cases presented in a single shift; the incorrect depiction of CPR, which would look "much more violent" in real life; and the unrealistically rapid resolution of intricate cases. Sachs has stated that CPR could not always be done correctly in the series because it cannot be performed on an actor. Some physicians noted that they spend a lot more time filling medical records in real life. Ramcharran found the portrayal of hospital administrators inaccurate, saying: "The idea of an administrator coming down in the actual shift and engaging with you in real time ... that's not realistic. You can imagine how that would be an incredible disruption to patient care." He thought that tension over systemic issues such as patient satisfaction and hospital incentives would not result in interpersonal conflict, but he understood "why they do that for the show". A scene in the 11th episode depicting childbirth with shoulder dystocia and postpartum hemorrhage complications was criticized as unrealistic by OB/GYN physicians. The depiction of mandatory reporting suspicions of child abuse has also been criticized by social workers and emergency physicians, with Yale New Haven Health emergency physician Dr. Alexis Cordone criticizing the show's emphasis on providing proof for allegations as "[setting] unrealistic expectations for viewers who might be navigating similar circumstances in their own lives."

=== Accolades ===
The Pitt has received several accolades from television award ceremonies. It has been nominated for 19 Primetime Emmy Awards, 19 Primetime Creative Arts Emmy Awards, and two Golden Globe Awards. Its first season won Outstanding Drama Series, Outstanding Lead Actor in a Drama Series (Wyle for "9:00 P.M."), Outstanding Supporting Actress in a Drama Series (LaNasa for "9:00 P.M."), Outstanding Guest Actor in a Drama Series (Hatosy for "9:00 P.M."), and Outstanding Casting for a Drama Series (Cathy Sandrich Gelfond and Erica Berger) at the 77th Primetime Emmy and Primetime Creative Arts Emmy Awards. It also won Best Television Series – Drama and Best Actor in a Television Series – Drama (Wyle) at the 83rd Golden Globe Awards. The American Film Institute listed the series among one of the 10 best television programs of 2025.

== See also ==
- Critical, a British medical drama with similar narrative.
- The Trauma Code: Heroes on Call, a South Korean medical comedy drama with similar narative.
