= 10 A.M. =

10 A.M. or variants may refer to:

- A time on the 12-hour clock
- "10AM / Save the World", a 2018 song by Metro Boomin from the deluxe version of Not All Heroes Wear Capes
- 10 attometres, a very small distance equal to 10^{−17} metres
  - Orders of magnitude (length), a comparative scale regime at 10 attometers
- "10:00 A.M." (The Pitt season 1), episode 4 from season 1 of The Pitt
- "10:00 A.M." (The Pitt season 2), episode 4 from season 2 of The Pitt

== See also ==
- "10 A.M. Automatic", a 2014 single by The Black Keys
