= 10:00 A.M. (The Pitt season 1) =

- The Pitt episode
- Episode no.: Season 1 Episode 4
- Directed by: Amanda Marsalis
- Written by: Noah Wyle
- Cinematography by: Johanna Coelho
- Editing by: Mark Strand
- Production code: T76.10104
- Original air date: January 23, 2025
- Running time: 50 minutes

Guest appearances
- Amielynn Abellera as Perlah; Jalen Thomas Brooks as Mateo Diaz; Brandon Mendez Homer as Donnie; Kristin Villanueva as Princess; Mika Abdalla as Jenna; Mackenzie Astin as Jereme Spencer; Abby Ryder Fortson as Kristi Wheeler; J. Teddy Garces as Wendell Stone; Eva Everett Irving as Tasha Cordera; Brandon Keener as John Bradley; Krystel V. McNeil as Kiara Alfaro; Alexandra Metz as Dr. Yolanda Garcia; Marguerite Moreau as Lynette Wheeler; Drew Powell as Doug Driscoll; Samantha Sloyan as Lily Bradley; Rebecca Tilney as Helen Spencer; Tracy Vilar as Lupe Perez

Episode chronology
← Previous "9:00 A.M."	Next → "11:00 A.M."

"10:00 A.M." is the fourth episode of the American medical drama television series The Pitt. The episode was written by main lead actor Noah Wyle, and directed by co-executive producer Amanda Marsalis. It was released on Max on January 23, 2025.

The series is set in Pittsburgh, following the staff of the Pittsburgh Trauma Medical Hospital ER (nicknamed "The Pitt") during a 15-hour emergency department shift. The series mainly follows Dr. Michael "Robby" Robinavitch, a senior attending still reeling from some traumas.

The episode received mostly positive reviews from critics, who praised the individual cases and performances, although some felt mixed over its disjointed nature.

== Plot ==
Robby extubates Mr. Spencer and comforts his adult children, suggesting that they perform a Hawaiian ritual, Hoʻoponopono, taught to him by his mentor, Dr. Adamson. As they begin to do this, Robby experiences a flashback to treating Adamson in the very same room during the COVID-19 pandemic and has a panic attack.

Mel and Mohan treat a baby with a hair tourniquet. Mel scares the worried mother while discussing differential diagnoses and Collins politely corrects her. Nurse Mateo Diaz experiences racist comments from Doug Driscoll, a patient angry about the long wait time. Javadi sutures a transgender patient's wound and corrects a misgendering error on her medical record without being asked.

Santos puts a patient on BiPAP, treating without consulting a superior as she has been told not to do. The patient crashes. She insensitively asks if she can put in a chest tube, which he doesn't need. Langdon tells her again that she must run things by a senior resident or attending, which Robby confirms. Garcia angrily asks what happened but softens when she hears it was Santos' mistake.

Mel and Mohan diagnose a young girl with an imperforate hymen, offering support to her single father.

Dana, Whitaker and other nurses struggle to administer an injection to a psychotic patient, Mr. Krakozhia, waiting for a bed in the psychiatric department. After trying to hold him back, Whitaker injects him, although the man urinates on him. Jenna apologizes to Nick's parents and explains that they took the unprescribed Xanax to fall asleep after having drunk a lot of coffee during a study session. Collins prepares to administer a medication abortion prescribed by Abbot to seventeen-year-old Kristi, accompanied by her aunt Lynette.

Mr. Spencer's children continue giving words in his last moments. His daughter expresses her frustration that he did not give full attention to his family, but is still content that he still brought something for other people. In the waiting room, a man experiences a seizure.

== Production ==
=== Development ===
The episode was written by main lead actor Noah Wyle, and directed by co-executive producer Amanda Marsalis. This marked Wyle's first writing credit, and Marsalis' second directing credit.

Wyle reportedly wanted to pick an early episode to write, as he could get it done before the series started filming. He specifically wanted this episode due to his interest in "the four things that matter most, the Ho'oponopono Hawaiian ritual, that I was really moved by, and also the ambulance chase".

=== Writing ===
Wyle explained that Robby's post-traumatic stress disorder coupled with the day's events would result in a concerning note, "The flashbacks — the moments of hesitation that he has throughout the day — are all building to a climax [where] he really does not want to be part of his present. And when it finally comes, it comes at the worst possible moment."

Isa Briones stated that Santos collaborating with surgeon Garcia is based on their similar backgrounds, "I think Santos and Garcia are very cut from the same cloth in the way that they keep to themselves, they're kind of hard asses, they like to give everyone shit. And I think they recognize that in each other, that everyone kind of doesn't like them and so they like each other. But yeah, I think it's just very much, they're good at what they do and they don't really take any shit from anyone, and so there's a kindred spirit there."

== Critical reception ==
"10:00 A.M." received mostly positive reviews from critics. Laura Bogart of The A.V. Club gave the episode a "B–" grade and wrote, "Heading into the 10–11 a.m. hour, the issues with The Pitt's approach to structure are becoming more apparent, with the show feeling too overstuffed and incomplete on the episode level. Some patient stories feel like they're lingering on for too long, while others are blitzed in too quickly to make an impression."

Alan Sepinwall wrote, "The subplot about the stolen ambulance doesn't necessarily require the show to take place in real time, but it was still an amusing bit of color, and a way to establish the emergency department as a workplace that feels real outside of the specific cases we’re following."

Maggie Fremont of Vulture gave the episode a perfect 5 star rating out of 5 and wrote, "After the nurses each take a limb to hold down, Whitaker is able to inject the psych meds the guy needs, but not before the man pees all over him. ... The kid cannot catch a break." Nick Bythrow of Screen Rant wrote, "With a greater focus on the patients in this episode, The Pitt feels like it's finally found its footing as a glimpse into the day in the life of doctors in a trauma hospital. Because of its multilayered approach, the series feels like it's starting to become a more unique medical drama. This is especially because of its ability to balance the interpersonal with the patient-oriented, focusing on the job itself more than anything else. It's something that the next episodes are likely to reflect as Robby keeps soldiering through the day."

Johnny Loftus of Decider wrote, "We're going to have to wait until episode 5 of The Pitt for a resolution. But just like Robby processing his emotional damage in the exact same second he's managing the grief of his patient's loved ones, the challenges Collins is experiencing in her own life could be twining with her work as an ER doc." Gabriela Burgos Soler of Telltale TV wrote, "So far, it is refreshing to see a new take in the medical drama, proving that despite there being plenty of them airing, there is always something new to say in the genre."
