= Mel King (The Pitt) =

Fictional character from The Pitt

- The Pitt character
- First appearance: "7:00 A.M. (2025)"
- Created by: R. Scott Gemmill
- Portrayed by: Taylor Dearden

In-universe information
- Full name: Melissa King
- Occupation: Second-year resident physician (season 1); Third-year resident physician (season 2)
- Family: Becca King (twin sister)
- Home: Pittsburgh, Pennsylvania

Melissa "Mel" King is a fictional character from the HBO Max medical procedural drama The Pitt, portrayed by actress Taylor Dearden. Mel was introduced in "7:00 A.M.", where she begins her first day working in the emergency department of Pittsburgh Trauma Medical Center. Throughout the day, Mel proves herself to be a compassionate doctor who cares deeply for her twin sister Becca. In the show's second season, her relationship with Becca is further developed while Mel simultaneously struggles to cope with being named in her first medical malpractice lawsuit.

Mel is implied to be neurodivergent. The characterisation of Mel and her portrayal by Dearden, a neurodivergent actress, has received praise from critics and audiences.

== Character biography ==
=== Characteristics ===
Mel is written as a talented physician who provides an excellent standard of care. She also proves to be a capable leader. She is optimistic, sensitive and protective of her twin sister Becca. It is implied that Mel is neurodivergent.

=== Season 1 ===
Season 1 introduces Mel as a second-year resident physician. She has previously worked at a Veterans' Affairs hospital.

During her shift, Mel bonds with Dr. Frank Langdon. In "1:00 P.M.", when Langdon struggles to treat an autistic patient named Terrance, Mel assists by alleviating the room's sensory stimuli, clearly communicating with Terrance and reframing questions to adapt to his way of thinking. Langdon is impressed by Mel's approach and praises her for it. Mel explains that she has experience with neurodivergence because her sister Becca (Tal Anderson) is also autistic.

Mel is Becca's primary guardian, though Becca lives in an assisted living facility. After her shift is over, Mel picks Becca up from the facility and takes her out for dinner and a movie.

=== Season 2 ===
In season 2, Mel now a third-year resident. She is faced with a medical malpractice deposition after performing a lumbar puncture on a child patient with measles. The deposition damages Mel's confidence. She also experiences a minor concussion during her shift.

Mel feels shaken when her sister Becca arrives at the hospital as a patient. After Becca is treated by Langdon, she tells Mel that, for the past six months, she has had a boyfriend whom she has been having sex with. Mel becomes upset that Becca did not previously tell her about this.

At the end of the day, Mel relieves her stress by going to a bar and doing karaoke with Dr. Trinity Santos: together they perform "You Oughta Know" by Alanis Morissette.

== Development ==
Mel's character was developed with advice from Dr. Wendy Ross, a developmental and behavioural paediatrician who also serves as the director of the Jefferson Center for Autism and Neurodiversity. It was Ross' suggestion to not explicitly confirm an autism diagnosis for Mel within the show in order to reflect the high rates of autistic women who are diagnosed later in life or not at all. Ross also recommended that a neurodivergent actress should be cast in the role.

Dearden said her performance was informed by her own experiences of having ADHD. While filming the first season, she approached Noah Wyle with the suggestion that Mel should work well during emergencies, something that she has described as "a very real ADHD thing". Dearden had previously been disappointed by the portrayal of neurodivergent characters as emotionless and the usage of neurodivergence for comedic effect in most general media.

Dearden has also said that she plays Mel as an asexual character. Amid speculation about Mel's relationship with Langdon (played by Patrick Ball), Dearden felt that it was more powerful for their relationship to remain platonic, stating in an interview with Screen Rant, "we [Dearden and Ball] thought we were portraying a unique thing to see on TV, because you always see shipping, but you don't see platonic friends."

== Reception ==
The portrayal of Mel's neurodivergence has been widely praised. Placing Mel in contrast with the character of Dr. Shaun Murphy from The Good Doctor, Sarah Kurchak wrote for Time, "I often sense that autistic and autistish [sic] characters are more of a collection of random traits shoehorned into a vaguely human-shaped cog in a story than a fully realized component of a series or film. Mel, on the other hand, strikes me as a complete person whose traits are part of a greater whole." Her general compassion and the intuitive care she showed towards Terrance Swedeen in season one has also has received approval.

The decision to cast a neurodivergent actress to play Mel has also been praised.
