= 11 A.M. =

11 A.M. is a time on the 12-hour clock.

11 A.M. or variants may also refer to:

- 11 A.M. (film), a 2013 South Korean film
- 11AM (TV series), an Australian TV news program that aired from 1982 to 1999
- "11AM", a song by Incubus from their 2001 album Morning View
- "11:00 A.M." (The Pitt season 1), episode 5 from season 1 of The Pitt
- "11:00 A.M." (The Pitt season 2), episode 5 from season 2 of The Pitt

== See also ==
- 11 O'Clock, 1948 action film
