= 9:00 A.M. (The Pitt season 1) =

- The Pitt episode
- Episode no.: Season 1 Episode 3
- Directed by: Damian Marcano
- Written by: Joe Sachs; R. Scott Gemmill
- Cinematography by: Johanna Coelho
- Editing by: Lauren Pendergrass
- Production code: T76.10103
- Original air date: January 16, 2025
- Running time: 51 minutes

Guest appearances
- Amielynn Abellera as Perlah; Jalen Thomas Brooks as Mateo Diaz; Brandon Mendez Homer as Donnie; Kristin Villanueva as Princess; Mika Abdalla as Jenna; Mackenzie Astin as Jereme Spencer; Alfonso Caballero as Otis Williams; Joanna Going as Theresa Saunders; Brandon Keener as John Bradley; Krystel V. McNeil as Kiara Alfaro; Alexandra Metz as Dr. Yolanda Garcia; Drew Powell as Doug Driscoll; Ashley Romans as Joyce St. Claire; Blake Shields as Hank; Samantha Sloyan as Lily Bradley; Arun Storrs as Minu; Rebecca Tilney as Helen Spencer

Episode chronology
← Previous "8:00 A.M."	Next → "10:00 A.M."

"9:00 A.M." is the third episode of the first season of the American medical drama television series The Pitt. The episode was written by co-executive producer Joe Sachs and series creator R. Scott Gemmill, and directed by co-executive producer Damian Marcano. It was released on Max on January 16, 2025.

The series is set in Pittsburgh, following the staff of the Pittsburgh Trauma Medical Hospital ER (nicknamed "The Pitt") during a 15-hour emergency department shift. The series mainly follows Dr. Michael "Robby" Robinavitch, a senior attending still reeling from some traumas. In the episode, one of Whitaker's patients die for his first time, and Robby tries to help the parents of a brain dead boy.

The episode received critical acclaim, with critics praising the performances, character development and themes in the episode.

== Plot ==
Whitaker performs CPR on Bennet Milton, one of his patients, despite the staff telling him to stop. After the maximum time for chest compressions and medication, Milton is declared dead. The team debriefs the death of Mr. Milton and find that nothing more could have been done with the information they had.

McKay and Javadi successfully treat Jenna, a young woman experiencing an overdose after taking Xanax laced with fentanyl. Robby informs the parents of Nick, the other overdose patient, that there is one test left before confirming he is brain dead. Nick's father recognizes Jenna. He angrily accuses her of giving Nick fentanyl and killing him, before being removed by security.

Santos frustrates her colleagues with her brashness and overconfidence. Collins coaches Javadi to intubate a patient that has been shot in the chest with a nail gun. Mel and Langdon treat a patient with a STEMI and perform a cardioversion on a man addicted to vaping. Robby chastises Mohan over her excessive focus on stable patients, leading to a slow work pace and fewer patients treated. Myrna tries to escape but Robby catches her.

McKay and Kiara tell Robby to get David, who ran away, back to the ER by any means necessary. Robby accompanies the sister of a young veteran that died during the night shift. She asks him to read the letter Dr. Abbot wrote to her out loud. Mohan encourages Whitaker to face his fears. As Dana takes a smoke break outside, someone steals an ambulance. Mr. Spencer's adult children agree to withdraw treatment of their father's intubation to lessen his suffering and allow for a less traumatic death.

== Context ==
Mr. Spencer's adult children note that he worked on the sets of Mr. Roger's Neighborhood in Pittsburgh.

== Production ==
The episode was written by co-executive producer Joe Sachs and series creator R. Scott Gemmill, and directed by co-executive producer Damian Marcano. This marked Sachs' first writing credit, Gemmill's third writing credit, and Marcano's first directing credit.

== Critical reception ==
"9:00 A.M." received critical acclaim. Laura Bogart of The A.V. Club gave the episode an "A" grade and wrote, "Whitaker's quiet devastation at losing this patient forms a thematic lynchpin for an episode that is clearly focused on how the patients and providers alike must come to terms with death. The episode takes on a slightly slower pace, focusing on a few select patients whose stories directly touch on themes of loss, that actually manages to magnify its intensity and emotional heft compared to the more frenetic pace of the prior two episodes. Indeed, having a more singular theme allows the series to deepen the character work introduced earlier."

Alan Sepinwall wrote, "while the show's retro vibe doesn't go so far as to do its own version of an Eighties or Nineties ensemble drama opening credits sequence, it's fun to look for moments that could be part of such a hypothetical sequence. For example, [King] trying and failing to high-five someone would have to be Taylor Dearden's big credits moment, right?"

Maggie Fremont of Vulture gave the episode a 3 star rating out of 5 and wrote, "We're three episodes in, and I'm still a little bit in awe that this show can pull off enough emotion to tug at the heartstrings with so much chaos to contend with. The “9:00 a.m.” hour feels even more chaotic than the previous two, which is saying something." Gabriela Burgos Soler of Telltale TV wrote, "There are plenty of medical dramas airing today, but The Pitt stands out not only because of the 24-hour format but also because of the decision not to allow a world beyond the Pitt to exist; the audience is just as confined as the characters are."

Johnny Loftus of Decider wrote, "Soon enough, Dr. Robby has to call it, and the med student has lost his first patient. It's no one's fault; they did all they could. It's just that today, this morning, at 9am in the ER, 'was this guy's day to leave this mortal coil.' It's a fact of their work that Robby says requires balance, balance he admits can be difficult to achieve. But as doctors of emergency medicine, they must endure. Aim to save the next life."

Carissa Pavlica of TV Fanatic gave the episode a 4.25 star rating out of 5 and wrote, "It's another hour in the emergency department on The Pitt Season 1 Episode 3, and it helps you see how the season's storytelling will unfold. New patients may come and go, but we're paying closer attention to some of the worst the system deals with, whether they're agonizingly sad, humorous, or sometimes frightening."
