= 4:00 P.M. (The Pitt season 2) =

- The Pitt episode
- Episode no.: Season 2 Episode 10
- Directed by: Damian Marcano
- Written by: Simran Baidwan
- Cinematography by: Johanna Coelho
- Editing by: Tamara Luciano
- Production code: T76.10210
- Original air date: March 12, 2026
- Running time: 42 minutes

Guest appearances
- Amielynn Abellera as Perlah Alawi; Brandon Mendez Homer as Donnie Donahue; Kristin Villanueva as Princess; Brittany Allen as Roxie Hamler; Tal Anderson as Becca King; Lesley Boone as Lena Handzo; Irene Choi as Dr. Joy Kwon; Lou Ferrigno Jr. as Brendon Park; Bonita Friedericy as Cora Wilkins; David Fumero as Derek Foster; John Getz as Lloyd Wilkins; Deepti Gupta as Dr. Eileen Shamsi; Taylor Handley as Paul Hamler; Laëtitia Hollard as Emma Nolan; Lucas Iverson as James Ogilvie; Jeff Kober as Duke Ekins; Alexandra Metz as Dr. Yolanda Garcia; Rusty Schwimmer as Monica Peters; Tracy Vilar as Lupe Perez; Ned Brower as Jesse Van Horn; Savannah Welch as Emily Werner; Alison Haislip as Morgan Stiles; Cheryl Umana as Helen Torres; Johnny Sneed as Austin Green

Episode chronology
← Previous "3:00 P.M."	Next → "5:00 P.M."

"4:00 P.M." is the tenth episode of the second season of the American medical drama television series The Pitt. It is the 25th overall episode of the series and was written by executive producer Simran Baidwan, and directed by co-executive producer Damian Marcano. It was released on HBO Max on March 12, 2026.

The series is set in Pittsburgh, following the staff of the Pittsburgh Trauma Medical Hospital ER (nicknamed "The Pitt") during a 15-hour emergency department shift. The series mainly follows Dr. Michael "Robby" Robinavitch, a senior attending still reeling from some traumas. In the episode, the staff begins treating the first victims of the water-park slide collapse, while Mohan experiences a humiliating moment.

The episode received highly positive reviews from critics, who praised the performances, pacing and character development.

== Plot ==
Two victims from the waterslide collapse are brought in. The first, Emily Werner, has lost one of her legs, and Robby instructs Ogilvie to hold onto the amputated leg (stored in a bag) while they operate on her. The second, a man named Derek Foster, is tended by a different staff led by Langdon and Santos, but constantly asks for the whereabouts of his son Zack. Emily unexpectedly awakens mid-procedure and panics upon seeing her amputated leg, but staff sedate her once more. Orthopedic surgeon Dr. Brendon "The Shark" Park later arrives to examine the leg and approves replantation.

Mohan and Joy treat patient Helen Torres, who arrives with a swollen leg, but Mohan becomes delirious and disoriented; Joy puts her in a wheelchair and takes her to a room to be analyzed, where Langdon diagnoses her with a panic attack. Robby questions her, and discovers Mohan is just stressed because of her relationship with her mother; he mockingly dismisses her issues and rebukes her for wasting their time before storming off. Santos is hostile towards Langdon while working with him to treat Derek, and is further frustrated when Al-Hashimi and Garcia commend his actions and criticize her behavior. She talks privately with Garcia, bemoaning how Langdon is still allowed to work at the hospital while she is being treated like a pariah for exposing his addiction, but Garcia reminds Santos that Langdon owned up to his mistakes, and that her unpopularity with the staff is likely due to her abrasiveness and inability to collaborate with others.

Another victim from the water park, an eight-year-old boy, arrives at the hospital. He is unresponsive, and his fractured larynx indicates he will have a severe heart attack; Al-Hashimi performs an emergency slash tracheotomy, saving the boy's life. Mel returns from her deposition; hospital attorney Morgan Stiles admits she found the hearing unprofessional and assures Mel it will not impact her career, but Mel remains shaken. She checks on Becca, who tells her she was diagnosed with an urinary tract infection, likely due to sex with her boyfriend, whom Mel was unaware of.

Duke Ekins, a motorcycle engineer and friend of Robby, arrives at the hospital a few hours later than expected due to hoarseness in his throat, and Robby and Whitaker examine him. Duke advises Robby not to spend all night riding after working a full day. Al-Hashimi chastises Robby for his lack of empathy with Mohan earlier; Robby then apologizes to Mohan, but asks her to stay focused on the patients. After consulting with the Hamlers, McKay finally agrees to give Roxie a high dose of morphine as a form of euthanasia.

== Production ==
=== Development ===
The episode was written by executive producer Simran Baidwan, and directed by co-executive producer Damian Marcano. This marked Baidwan's fifth writing credit, and Marcano's seventh directing credit.

=== Writing ===
Supriya Ganesh was informed of Mohan's panic attack while filming the prior episode. She recalled her own experiences suffering panic attacks in preparing for the scene, saying: "In the experiences I've had with it myself and when I have talked to other people about it, it does come up out of the blue. That's why it's different from your average on-the-mill anxiety attack. It's very intense and I leaned into that as much as I could. I made a list of all of the things she's dealt with that day that are so anxiety-inducing." She also said that "almost everything was sequentially shot."

Regarding the scene where Robby scolds Mohan, Ganesh added, "What made me emotional was not even like how Dr. Robby spoke to Samira, but it was more so seeing Dr. Al-Hashimi's character in the room watching it — there's something so deeply humiliating to her about that, because that's someone she wants to impress." She also states that Mohan was not fully content with Robby's apology near the end, "I think there does need to be an apology on Robby's end for how he's speaking to someone who's a woman and who's lower than him in the power scale. And I do think she wished that she would have gotten more of an apology from him in that moment."

=== Casting ===
Lou Ferrigno Jr. guest starred in the episode as orthopedic surgeon Dr. Brendon Park, nicknamed "Park the Shark" for his intimidating presence.

== Critical reception ==
"4:00 P.M." received highly positive reviews from critics. Jesse Schedeen of IGN gave the episode a perfect "masterpiece" 10 out of 10 rating and wrote in his verdict, "“4:00 PM” is easily the best installment of The Pitt Season 2 to date. The tension in the ER has reached a fever pitch, and multiple doctors are hitting their respective breaking points. The result is a tense and utterly gripping new chapter that never lets up for a minute. Whether it's the big moments of drama and psychological meltdowns or the quieter, more contemplative scenes of human misery, this episode showcases exactly why The Pitt is a cut above most medical shows."

Caroline Siede of The A.V. Club gave the episode a "B" grade and wrote, "As viewers, we know this season of The Pitt is going to last for 15 hours, but as far as the staffers at PTMC are concerned, they're relatively close to the end of their 12-hour shift. And you can tell they're reaching their workday limit because the vibes at “4:00 P.M.” have turned absolutely rancid. When the victims of a horrific waterslide collapse are holding it together better than the doctors treating them, you know something is wrong. In fact, almost everyone is on their worst, most passive-aggressive behavior this hour, which seems like both an intentional part of The Pitt's season-long storytelling and also, perhaps, an example of the show's writers getting a little burnt out themselves."

Maggie Fremont of Vulture gave the episode a 4 star rating out of 5 and wrote, "Sure, it's stating the obvious at this point, but damn, everyone on The Pitt is stressed out. But it's a stress that feels different from last season. Last time, at the ED's peak of stress — the mass casualty event — it seems like everyone really rose to the occasion. Yeah, Robby had his mental breakdown in the middle of it, but overall, he was focused on the task at hand. This season, the ED has been faced with constant pressure thanks to the holiday, but most of our doctors are also dealing with personal stress, and perhaps we've reached the point in the season where more than the cracks are beginning to show... the flood is bursting through. Is everyone going to burn out?"

Johnny Loftus of Decider wrote, "Dana's red phone is ringing again, and new traumas are inbound. Patient of the week? That's for generic medical dramas. On The Pitt, it's more like disaster of the week. And as we reach Season 2 Episode 10 (“4:00PM”) – the later afternoon of this long, sweaty, no-computer-ass shift – the stress of life in the ED is also doing disaster numbers among the staff." Adam Patla of Telltale TV gave the episode a 4.8 star rating out of 5 and wrote, "It's particularly nice to see McKay and Mohan shine a bit more when they were a bit more relegated in the front half of the season. In an episode that feels like the largest in terms of scope so far this season, it also feels the most tender. The anxiety intertwines with the heartbreak in an interesting, but effective way."

Sean T. Collins of The New York Times wrote, "Despite his earlier insistence on bringing his wife back home, Roxie's husband has accepted her wishes. At the last moment, when she asks him to go tend to their sons, he demurs, saying her bedside is exactly where he needs to be. The Pitt has shown us the strain death and dying can place on the living; it does the heart good to see this woman's loved ones feel able to give her what she needs in the end." Jasmine Blu of TV Fanatic gave the episode a 4.2 star rating out of 5 and wrote, "Robby and Santos are vying for who is going to be the absolute worst, most obnoxious person on shift during The Pitt Season 2 Episode 10."
