= 11:00 A.M. (The Pitt season 1) =

- The Pitt episode
- Episode no.: Season 1 Episode 5
- Directed by: John Cameron
- Written by: Simran Baidwan
- Cinematography by: Johanna Coelho
- Editing by: Joey Reinisch
- Production code: T76.10105
- Original air date: January 30, 2025
- Running time: 48 minutes

Guest appearances
- Amielynn Abellera as Perlah; Jalen Thomas Brooks as Mateo Diaz; Brandon Mendez Homer as Donnie; Kristin Villanueva as Princess; Kayla Blake as Rita Kitajima; Abby Ryder Fortson as Kristi Wheeler; Brandon Keener as John Bradley; Alexandra Metz as Dr. Yolanda Garcia; Marguerite Moreau as Lynette Wheeler; Drew Powell as Doug Driscoll; Ashley Romans as Joyce St. Claire; Bess Rous as Sherry Davis; Samantha Sloyan as Lily Bradley; Arun Storrs as Minu; Shu Lan Tuan as Ginger Kitajima; Ellen Wroe as Eloise Wheeler; Taj Speights as Jake Malloy

Episode chronology
← Previous "10:00 A.M."	Next → "12:00 P.M."

"11:00 A.M." is the fifth episode of the American medical drama television series The Pitt. The episode was written by executive producer Simran Baidwan, and directed by John Cameron. It was released on Max on January 30, 2025.

The series is set in Pittsburgh, following the staff of the Pittsburgh Trauma Medical Hospital ER (nicknamed "The Pitt") during a 15-hour emergency department shift. The series mainly follows Dr. Michael "Robby" Robinavitch, a senior attending still reeling from some traumas. In the episode, Collins realizes her case with Kristi might be more complicated than expected, while Whitaker and Santos face different challenges in their cases.

The episode received mostly positive reviews from critics, who praised the performances and intensity of the episode.

== Plot ==
Santos argues with Langdon over patient Joseph Marino's treatment plan. She tries to report a faulty vial of lorazepam. Mohan and Robby coach Whitaker through his next patients. While Whitaker tries to keep himself calmed, he almost ruins a patient's treatment, causing the patient to ask for another doctor.

Jake, the son of Robby's ex-girlfriend with whom he has a familial bond, visits the Pitt to fetch two tickets for Pitt Fest, a music festival. Originally planning to go with Robby, he instead decided to take his girlfriend Leah. Collins' ultrasound measurements suggest that Kristi may be past the gestational limit for abortion, implying that Abbot may have falsified his data previously. Robby performs another ultrasound and records the gestational age as one day under the cutoff to qualify Kristi for an abortion, assuring an alarmed Collins that she will not be blamed if the incident comes to light.

McKay connects with Sherry, a struggling mother, by sharing her own life story. McKay says that she used to be a drug addict but remains nine years sober. Mel tries to comfort Rita, the daughter of elderly patient, Ginger Kitajima. Seeing Rita struggling with caregiver stress, Mel advises her to take a break. Rita goes to collect her car and does not return. Robby reprimands Mohan for her slowness. Javadi embarrasses Sherry by referring her to a social worker based on what she learned about Sherry's struggles from McKay, making her flee. McKay scolds and confronts Javadi for acting presumptuously. Langdon performs a retrograde intubation guided by Robby, who later tells Langdon he has recommended him for a prestigious fellowship.

Collins praises Mohan for her approach to patient care. Collins is about to administer the abortion medication when Kristi's mother Eloise arrives, upset with the news. As Kristi is a minor, only Eloise can approve of an abortion, and she refuses to let her go with it.

== Production ==
=== Development ===
The episode was written by executive producer Simran Baidwan, and directed by John Cameron. This marked Baidwan's first writing credit, and Cameron's first directing credit.

=== Writing ===
Regarding Santos' actions in the episode, Isa Briones explained, "Santos is someone who doesn't often think that they're wrong and somethings has the stuff to back it up. I think she's very smart, but just up to that point, there's been so much clashing with Langdon that it's in the heat of the moment."

== Critical reception ==
"11:00 A.M." received mostly positive reviews from critics. Laura Bogart of The A.V. Club gave the episode a "B–" grade and wrote, "Being an emergency-room physician is all about making choices. In a frenzied moment when the angels of life and death dance on the head of a pin, a certain medicine at a specific dosage in a very particular way can make all the difference. And The Pitt certainly has its share of heightened life-or-death moments — in this episode alone, there are at least two — but the 11 a.m.-to-noon hour is also about the choices made on a smaller, more intimate scale that can have dire consequences of their own."

Alan Sepinwall wrote, "This week's The Pitt takes us to the one-third mark of the 15-episode season, and does a good job of demonstrating the strengths of the idea of following one shift over an entire season. Sure, a single episode focusing on this shift would have room for some of these ongoing threads, like the running gag about Whitaker constantly needing new scrubs, or the increasingly complicated case of the teenage girl seeking a medical abortion. But there wouldn't be room for all of them, and certainly not told with this level of detail and nuance. I have mixed feelings about the structure on the whole, but this episode's a really good example of it."

Maggie Fremont of Vulture gave the episode a 4 star rating out of 5 and wrote, "while The Pitt mostly aims to give us a realistic look at life inside a busy, underfunded hospital rather than build thematic ties between patients or storylines like perhaps some other medical dramas aim to, I did appreciate the choice this week to juxtapose two wildly different intubations for us. It is the same treatment but done in starkly different ways." Nick Bythrow of Screen Rant wrote, "With engaging storylines for doctors and patients alike, The Pitt offers a perfect balance between the two sides of the isle, crafting the perfect continuation that sees the series come into its own. Since there's still 10 episodes left in the show, there's going to be even more critical moments informing character decisions and developments, hinging on the interactions between all parties involved. This will definitely mean more relevant subjects will be broached, especially after such an important, suspenseful conclusion."

Johnny Loftus of Decider wrote, "As Dr. Robby reaches hour five of his shift – Episode 5 of The Pitt for us – we get a few more defining details about his life outside of being an easygoing yet tightly-wound attending surgeon. Like a visit from Jake, Robby's 17-year-old son, who the staff treats as both mascot of the emergency department and, collectively, their own son." Gabriela Burgos Soler of Telltale TV gave the episode a 4 star rating out of 5 and wrote, "While the first four episodes were filled with intense and physically demanding cases, this one is more emotionally heavy. It doesn't make for a relaxing hour of TV."
