= 1:00 P.M. (The Pitt season 1) =

- The Pitt episode
- Episode no.: Season 1 Episode 7
- Directed by: Silver Tree
- Written by: Valerie Chu
- Cinematography by: Johanna Coelho
- Editing by: Mark Strand
- Production code: T76.10107
- Original air date: February 13, 2025
- Running time: 46 minutes

Guest appearances
- Amielynn Abellera as Perlah; Jalen Thomas Brooks as Mateo Diaz; Brandon Mendez Homer as Donnie; Kristin Villanueva as Princess; Mika Abdalla as Jenna; Sasha Bhasin as Nandi; Coby Bird as Terrance; Abby Ryder Fortson as Kristi Wheeler; Ivy George as Alana Dunn; Michael Hyatt as Gloria Underwood; Brandon Keener as John Bradley; Krystel V. McNeil as Kiara Alfaro; Marguerite Moreau as Lynette Wheeler; Tyler Poelle as Silas Dunn; Drew Powell as Doug Driscoll; Samantha Sloyan as Lily Bradley; Arun Storrs as Minu; Shu Lan Tuan as Ginger Kitajima; Tracy Vilar as Lupe Perez; Ellen Wroe as Eloise Wheeler

Episode chronology
← Previous "12:00 P.M."	Next → "2:00 P.M."

"1:00 P.M." is the seventh episode of the American medical drama television series The Pitt. The episode was written by Valerie Chu, and directed by Silver Tree. It was released on Max on February 13, 2025.

The series is set in Pittsburgh, following the staff of the Pittsburgh Trauma Medical Hospital ER (nicknamed "The Pitt") during a 15-hour emergency department shift. The series mainly follows Dr. Michael "Robby" Robinavitch, a senior attending still reeling from some traumas. In the episode, Santos realizes that a patient might be molesting his daughter, while Mel helps Langdon with an autistic patient.

The episode received critical acclaim, with critics praising the writing, performances, character development and ending.

== Plot ==
As Collins struggles to maintain order between Eloise and Lynette, Robby talks with Gloria again over how the situation happened, blaming the overcrowded waiting area and understaffing. Robby convinces Kristi to leave the bathroom for a private room.

Langdon treats an autistic patient with an ankle sprain, but struggles to keep up with his questions. Upon learning this, Mel decides to treat the patient, winning him over by lowering light and noise as well as communicating literally, surprising Langdon. Whitaker, Langdon, and Robby call in the ECMO team for assistance in treating a patient with a STEMI heart attack. Mohan and Javadi treat Nandi, a beauty influencer with suspected schizophrenia, but Mohan keeps investigating her symptoms. Minu's rescuer says he will give a statement to law enforcement.

Santos is approached by Silas' wife, who confesses that she drugged him with progesterone to dull his sex drive, believing that he is molesting their daughter Alana. When she confides this in Robby, he states he will talk with the wife, but reiterates they must also consider she almost killed her husband. Santos broaches the topic of abuse with Alana, but she is confused. Robby and Collins disagree on how to coach Mohan. Robby experiences another flashback to Adamson's death.

Robby and Kiara inform Silas' wife that due to protocol, they have to report her to authorities, as Silas could have died. The wife leaves in disgust, prompting Santos to lash out at Kiara, as Alana could be left alone with her father. She privately confronts an intubated but conscious Silas, threatening to harm him or report him to the police unless he stops his abuse. Collins convinces Kristi's mother to let her get the abortion. Collins then goes to the bathroom, where she tearfully realizes that she has had a miscarriage.

== Production ==
=== Development ===
The episode was written by Valerie Chu, and directed by Silver Tree. This marked Chu's first writing credit, and Tree's first directing credit.

=== Writing ===
While Isa Briones liked to play Santos with her usual mannerisms, she was also interested in her scene confronting Silas for abusing his own daughter. She said, "It's interesting to attack [the emotional stuff] when the character you're playing is not an emotional person," she says. "It's threading that needle of, clearly, emotions are poking through, but only a little bit. I'm a crier, so I would start talking, saying the lines, and I'd start really crying, and I can't do that because Santos wouldn't do that. That was a fun change for me because I think so [often] in acting, your currency is your tears, but that's not what this calls for. It's a very different beast." When Briones was prepared to film the scene, Noah Wyle noted that she would deliver the first monologue in the series. She added, "It was a moment of, like, power to be able to say something like that. As a person, I try to keep things in, but no matter what, they still come out. Like I still get emotional. Whereas she really tries to keep it behind the wall."

Regarding the ending, where it is revealed that Collins miscarriaged, Wyle explained, "Miscarriages happen a lot to women and a lot of times they happen in the workplace on the job and a lot of times women don't have the option of going home. I've known several actresses that have miscarried in their trailers and gone back to work for another six or seven hours through a shooting day. There's a woman that works on this show who had a very similar experience, and it was one that we felt like we wanted to tell."

== Critical reception ==
"1:00 P.M." received critical acclaim. Laura Bogart of The A.V. Club gave the episode an "A" grade and wrote, "One of the great pleasures of longform episodic television is getting acquainted enough with the core characters that you want to know more about them (even as you can already anticipate how they'll react to certain scenarios). By its nature, The Pitt rewards viewers who have stayed invested in many layers of subplots that seem simultaneously designed to plant new seeds of character development while allowing others to grow. In the seventh episode, the emotions and histories that have been bubbling beneath the surface come fully into bloom (and some are more devastating than others)."

Alan Sepinwall wrote, "There's a lot of excellent stuff in this week's episode, though. But it's also maybe the one that most made me question the idea of all of these things happening to these doctors in the same shift. [...] It is a lot, on top of everything else all the other docs have gone through in prior episodes, and some of the things I've seen in the upcoming ones."

Maggie Fremont of Vulture gave the episode a 4 star rating out of 5 and wrote, "Admittedly, I'm lukewarm on Trinity as a character, but it is a barn burner of a moment. I suspect she'll get reprimanded for at least some of this, but the woman had to do what she had to do." Nick Bythrow of Screen Rant wrote, "With more in-depth stories for many at the hospital, The Pitt episode 7 excels at delivering hard-hitting character moments mixed with important patient stories. The realities of what to expect at the trauma center are on full display here, while leaving off on a shocking cliffhanger teasing another important perspective. The episode perfectly emphasizes what makes the show stand out while giving a preview as to how things will ramp up as the day continues."

Johnny Loftus of Decider wrote, "While 1:00 P.M. is lunchtime at Pittsburgh Trauma Medical Hospital, its emergency department is too busy for anyone to actually eat lunch. And besides, a simple attack of the hangrys does not fully encompass what's going on in Episode 7 of The Pitt, which presents a staff verging on fray mode." Gabriela Burgos Soler of Telltale TV gave the episode a 4 star rating out of 5 and wrote, "Due to the nature of the emergency room, there has not been a moment to breathe, but no ambulances carrying emerging cases make an appearance during this particular hour. It is also strange not to see all the characters we have become familiar with running around. Perhaps they know that 1:00 p.m. is a quiet hour in the Pitt and decide to hide out in the break room."

=== Accolades ===
TVLine named Isa Briones as an honorable mention for the "Performer of the Week" for the week of February 15, 2025, for her performance in the episode. The site wrote, "The Pitt's Dr. Trinity Santos is among the most divisive characters currently on TV and Isa Briones has done an exceptional job making us actively dislike her arrogant alter ego. But something happened this week when the medical drama revealed a dark secret about Santos' past. As she confronted a patient who'd been molesting his teenage daughter, Santos disclosed that she knew men like him. Yes, Santos was towering over this creep, threatening to come after him if he ever tried anything further on his daughter, but this was also Santos finally letting down her guard down, letting us in, and exposing that she's just as fragile as the rest of us. Briones' quiet-yet-menacing performance went a long way toward humanizing a character who oftentimes has felt reptilian."
