= 5:00 P.M. (The Pitt season 2) =

- The Pitt episode
- Episode no.: Season 2 Episode 11
- Directed by: Uta Briesewitz
- Written by: Valerie Chu
- Cinematography by: Johanna Coelho
- Editing by: Joey Reinisch
- Production code: T76.10211
- Original air date: March 19, 2026
- Running time: 48 minutes

Guest appearances
- Amielynn Abellera as Perlah Alawi; Brandon Mendez Homer as Donnie Donahue; Max Adler as Ralph O'Hearn; Brittany Allen as Roxie Hamler; Tal Anderson as Becca King; Charles Baker as Troy Digby; Lesley Boone as Lena Handzo; Irene Choi as Dr. Joy Kwon; Ramona DuBarry as Pranita; Cathryn Dylan Ortiz as Brenda Azurmendi; Deepti Gupta as Dr. Eileen Shamsi; Taylor Handley as Paul Hamler; Laëtitia Hollard as Emma Nolan; Lucas Iverson as James Ogilvie; Jeff Kober as Duke Ekins; Rusty Schwimmer as Monica Peters; Travis Van Winkle as Curtis Larson; Tracy Vilar as Lupe Perez; Michael Alix as Roberto Lara; Lorna Lominac as Kiki; Johnny Sneed as Austin Green; Ned Brower as Jesse Van Horn

Episode chronology
← Previous "4:00 P.M."	Next → "6:00 P.M."

"5:00 P.M." is the eleventh episode of the second season of the American medical drama television series The Pitt. It is the 26th overall episode of the series and was written by Valerie Chu, and directed by co-executive producer Uta Briesewitz. It was released on HBO Max on March 19, 2026.

The series is set in Pittsburgh, following the staff of the Pittsburgh Trauma Medical Hospital ER (nicknamed "The Pitt") during a 15-hour emergency department shift. The series mainly follows Dr. Michael "Robby" Robinavitch, a senior attending still reeling from some traumas. In the episode, the staff faces a crisis when ICE agents arrive with a detainee who requires medical attention, with their presence affecting nurses and patients.

The episode received critical acclaim, with reviewers praising the performances, the episode's depiction of ICE, and the confrontation scene between Langdon and Santos.

Taylor Dearden, Fiona Dourif and Tal Anderson submitted the episode to support their Emmy nominations for Outstanding Supporting Actress in a Drama Series (Dearden and Dourif) and Outstanding Guest Actress in a Drama Series (Anderson), respectively.

== Plot ==
After administering the lethal dose of morphine to Roxie, McKay and Javadi discuss whether or not it was the right decision. McKay then asks Ogilvie to assist her in treating an unhoused addict, Kiki, who suffers from xylazine wounds, in the park across the street from the hospital. When Robby learns about this, he admonishes McKay for leaving the hospital amidst a crisis and informs her that Roxie died while she was away.

Mel questions Becca over her boyfriend Adam, and becomes aggressive when Becca is reluctant to share. After Becca convinces her the sex was consensual and she plans to spend the holiday evening with Adam, Mel confides in Dana about her anxiety, feeling betrayed that Becca did not tell her about the relationship earlier, and resenting Becca for finding love while Mel remains lonely.

Brenda Azurmendi arrives at the hospital bringing her unconscious son Micah, who suffers heat stroke after being in a closed car for a long time. Feeling guilty after being informed that there is a possibility of cognitive impairment, Brenda attempts suicide by intentionally stepping in front of a truck, but is thwarted when Al-Hashimi saves her.

Two ICE agents bring in a detainee with a rotator cuff tear named Pranita, whom they arrested during a restaurant raid. Their presence causes uneasiness among the staff and patients, some of whom decide to leave the hospital to avoid a potential confrontation with the agents. When nurse Jesse is about to give Pranita a sling, the agents insist on taking her away immediately. When Jesse protests, he is arrested and taken away alongside Pranita, shocking the hospital staff.

Ogilvie tends to Austin Green, a patient with kidney problems. Later, he suddenly loses consciousness due to the rupture of an abdominal aortic aneurysm. Dr. Shamsi manages to save him by doing an emergency thoracotomy, assisted by her daughter Javadi. Ogilvie apologizes to Robby for not checking Green's aorta, but Robby blames Mohan for failing to supervise Ogilvie properly as a senior resident, again blaming her inability to separate personal issues from work.

Robby informs Duke that he has found an enlarged mediastinum on his X-ray result, indicating several possible diseases that can only be ascertained through a chest CT scan. Robby decides to delay his sabbatical departure until he knows the result.

Santos and Whitaker tend to Roberto Lara, a man with joint dislocation who declines the use of anesthetics because he does not want to risk losing the ball he caught in a Major League Baseball game. Later, Langdon approaches Santos and attempts to apologize to her for his past behavior. Santos rejects his apology and says that true accountability would mean admitting to the staff that he stole medications from the hospital. Al-Hashimi witnesses their exchange.

Curtis Larson, a drunk golfer who was brought to the hospital after combative behavior, awakens in an agitated state and puts Emma, who was about to check his vitals, in a chokehold.

== Production ==
=== Development ===
The episode was written by Valerie Chu, and directed by co-executive producer Uta Briesewitz. It marked Chu's third writing credit, and Briesewitz's third directing credit.

=== Writing ===
Weeks prior to the episode's airing, executive producer John Wells revealed that when HBO Max was aware of the episode's inclusion of ICE, the staff got a note asking the series to depict it as "balanced" to show both points of view. Wells reiterated that the network did not censor nor asked to tone down elements, and they actually approved the final version that aired.

Showrunner R. Scott Gemmill said that the staff discussed including ICE in the second season for months, wondering how things would change by the time the episode aired, concluding that "things have escalated much more severely than we had ever anticipated. It got worse." Gemmill felt it was essential to depict the sequence "without sensationalizing." He further added, referring to the killings of Renée Good and Alex Pretti: "In retrospect, I think we could have pushed a little harder. We were trying to tell both sides of the story, trying to be fair, and yet, what's happened subsequently is much worse than anything we would have imagined. It felt important to tell that story because of what was going on. I'm glad we did it."

Isa Briones said that Santos confronting Langdon over his return was her favorite scene to film for the season, explaining "We've known that this anger has been inside [Santos], but you also get to see cracks in Langdon's exterior. He has come in and been like, 'I'm reformed, I'm going to apologize, and I'm doing my steps.' But you also get to see [Santos] is the person who can break through that exterior. You get to see both of them just poking holes in their armor."

== Critical reception ==
"5:00 P.M." received critical acclaim. Jesse Schedeen of IGN gave the episode an "amazing" 9 out of 10 rating and wrote in his verdict, "It may not quite reach the heights of its predecessor, but "5:00 PM" is still one of the better installments of The Pitt Season 2. This episode delivers another effective blend of quiet character moments and high-stakes medical drama. Episode 11's handling of the ICE storyline feels especially timely and necessary. It's also nice to see Fiona Dourif's Dr. McKay return to the spotlight, and Taylor Dearden delivers a series-best performance as she explores the cascading array of emotions weighing on poor Mel. As always, there's never a dull moment in The Pitt."

Caroline Siede of The A.V. Club gave the episode a "B+" grade and wrote, "In a season full of social issues, it's a welcome, full-throated condemnation of one of the existential threats of our time. No one is safer when ICE is around. Their restaurant employee detainee is denied even a phone call to her family. Patients and hospital workers leave out of fear. And Jesse winds up getting slapped in cuffs just for trying to stop an ICE agent from manhandling an injured woman who needs a sling. What's gained from all that cruelty?"

Maggie Fremont of Vulture gave the episode a 4 star rating out of 5 and wrote, "Well, it's "5 P.M.," and more of our PTMC docs are hitting their breaking point. Season two of The Pitt doesn't have the big set piece like season one did, but that doesn't mean everyone's emotions aren't at an all-time high or that their nerves aren't completely fried. And while the catalyst for those intense emotions may not be as objectively thrilling as the first season, it certainly feels much more personal." David Mack of Slate wrote, "We've seen patients with heat stroke, fireworks wounds, gruesome injuries obtained during boating mishaps, margarita burns, and even someone suffering after a hotdog-eating contest. But this latest episode emphasizes that this choice of time also allows The Pitt to say something grander about America, as the country readies itself to mark its 250th anniversary this summer amid such dark times."

Johnny Loftus of Decider wrote, "Robby could be risking losing a terrific, empathetic doctor when they need her skills the most. He's doing this while the gas-belching two-wheeled signifier of his personal life is essentially idling right outside. And he still intends to depart for his road trip sabbatical directly from work. We'd really like to ask Robby how this is not a distraction." Adam Patla of Telltale TV gave the episode a 4.6 star rating out of 5 and wrote, ""5:00 PM" doesn't shy away from where it stands, but it doesn't go to the point of exploitation. A mainstream series to addressing this head-on without attempting to absolve or take a neutral stance is major and essential."

Sean Morrison of Screen Rant wrote, "This week's episode of The Pitt was the most chaotic and stressful to date, both because of new visitors to Pittsburgh Trauma Medical Center and because of Dr. Langdon and Dr. Santos' long-awaited reunion. The Pitt season 2, episode 11 was one of the most eventful installments of the entire season. Almost everyone in the cast of The Pitt had some major development, from Ogilvie missing a huge risk with his patient to the fight between Santos and Langdon." Jasmine Blu of TV Fanatic gave the episode a 4.6 star rating out of 5 and wrote, "The Pitt Season 2 Episode 11 is high on adrenaline and emotion. ICE descends and wreaks havoc, short fuses start to blow, and a long-awaited confrontation results in an ultimatum."

== See also ==
- 2026 Bushwick hospital ICE incident
