= Amanda Marsalis =

American film director and photographer

- Born: United States
- Occupations: Photographer, film director

Amanda Marsalis is an American film director and photographer.

== Career ==
Marsalis grew up in the East Bay of San Francisco and moved to St. Louis, Missouri at the age of 12 or 13.

=== Photographic career ===
Marsalis attended California College of Arts and Crafts where she studied with Larry Sultan, Chris Johnson, Susan Ciriclio and Jim Goldberg. Her works were published in Vogue, Conde Nast Traveler, GQ, and The New York Times Magazine.

=== Directing career ===
Marsalis made her directorial debut in 2014 with the film Echo Park starring Mamie Gummer and Tony Okungbowa. She was referred to the producers by Rebecca Walker, an author with whom she had worked previously. The film premiered at the 2014 Los Angeles Film Festival. It was acquired for distribution in 2016 by ARRAY.

In 2015, Marsalis created a short documentary on Reese Witherspoon for Glamour when Witherspoon was honored with the Glamour Woman of the Year Award on the 25th anniversary of the event.

Marsalis directed six episodes of the critically acclaimed Netflix series Ozark, including four episodes of the final season. In 2025, she directed four episodes of Max medical drama series The Pitt, including the second episode, and the critically acclaimed twelfth episode "6:00 P.M.", which dealt with the aftermath of a mass shooting. For that episode Marsalis was nominated for an Emmy Award and was the winner of the DGA Award for Outstanding Directorial Achievement in a Dramatic Series.

Dramatic Series

== Filmography ==
Film

- Echo Park (2014)

Television

Year	Title	Director	Producer	Notes
2017	Queen Sugar	Yes	No	2 episodes
2018	Shooter	Yes	No	1 episode
2018-2022	Ozark	Yes	No	6 episodes
2019	Magnum P.I.	Yes	No	1 episodes
2019	For the People	Yes	No	1 episode
2019	Whiskey Cavalier	Yes	No	1 episode
2019	Veronica Mars	Yes	No	1 episode
2020	Westworld	Yes	No	1 episodes
2020	The Umbrella Academy	Yes	No	2 episodes
2020	Next	Yes	No	1 episode
2021	Invasion	Yes	Yes	4 episodes
2022	Naomi	Yes	Co-executive	1 episode
2022	Kindred	Yes	Co-executive	2 episodes
2023	Class of '09	Yes	No	2 episodes
2025	Ransom Canyon	Yes	Executive	4 episodes
2025-26	The Pitt	Yes	Co-executive	5 episodes
2026	Cape Fear	Yes	Executive	2 episodes
