= Mandatory reporting in the United States =

United States Federal Law requiring certain fields to report abuse

In many parts of the world, mandated reporters are people who have regular contact with vulnerable people such as children, disabled persons, and senior citizens, and are legally required to ensure a report is made when abuse is observed or suspected. Specific details vary across jurisdictions—the abuse that must be reported may include neglect, or financial, physical, sexual, or other types of abuse. Mandated reporters may include paid or unpaid people who have assumed full or intermittent responsibility for the care of a child, dependent adult, or elder.

== History ==
In 1962, United States doctors C. Henry Kempe and Brandt Steele published "The Battered Child Syndrome," which helped doctors identify child abuse, its effects, and the need to report serious physical abuse to legal authorities. Its publication changed the prevalent views in the United States, where child abuse was previously seen as uncommon, and not a regular issue. In 1974, the United States Congress passed the Child Abuse Prevention and Treatment Act (CAPTA), which provides funds to states for development of Child Protective Services (CPS) and hotlines to prevent serious injuries to children. These laws and the media and advocacy coverage and research brought about a gradual change in societal expectations on reporting in the United States and, at different rates, in other western nations.

Originally created to respond to physical abuse, reporting systems in various countries began to expand to address sexual and emotional abuse, neglect, and exposure to domestic abuse. This expansion was accompanied by broader requirements for reporting abuse: previously reports were only submitted when an incident caused serious physical injury, but as the definitions changed, more minor physical injuries and developmental and psychological trauma began to be included as well.

== Statistics ==
Nationwide, there was a 2348% increase in hotline calls from 150,000 in 1963 to 3.3 million in 2009. In 2011, there were 3.4 million calls. From 1992 to 2009 in the US, substantiated cases of sexual abuse declined 62%, physical abuse decreased 56% and neglect 10%. About 1% of the child population are substantiated victims of abuse.

There are approximately 3.6 million calls each year nationwide: 9,000/day, 63,000/week, affecting on average 1 out of 10 U.S. families with children under the age of 18 each year (there are 32.2 million such families). From 1998 to 2011 there were a total of 43 million hotline calls. Of those substantiated, over half are minor situations and many are situations where the worker thinks something may happen in the future.

Each year, approximately 85% of hotline calls either do not warrant investigation or are not substantiated. Approximately 78% of all investigations are unsubstantiated and approximately 22% are substantiated, with around 9% where "alternative responses" are offered in some states, which have a focus on working with the family to address issues rather than confirming maltreatment.

== Criteria ==
In the United States, the Centers for Disease Control and Prevention (CDC) and the Department for Children and Families (DCF) define child maltreatment as any act or series of acts of commission or omission by a parent or other caregiver that results in harm, potential for harm, or threat of harm to a child.

There are four major categories of child abuse: neglect, physical abuse, psychological or emotional abuse, and sexual abuse. Neglect may include abandonment, denial of proper care and attention physically, emotionally, or morally, or living under conditions, circumstances or associations injurious to well-being. Typically, minimum requirements for what must be reported include:

- A description of how the reporter learned of the injuries or neglect and of any actions taken to assist
- Information on previous injuries, assaults, neglect or financial abuses (if known)
- The date, time, nature, and extent of the abuse or neglect (if known)
- The date of the report
- The perpetrator's name, address, and relationship to the (possible) victim (if known)
- The reporter's name, agency, position, address, telephone number, and signature.

Typically, reporters are encouraged to report their suspicions and not to investigate or wait for absolute proof, which can lead to further harm directed at the suspected victim, and allow for perpetrators to prepare their defence through intimidation. The investigation of the abuse is then left to professionals. Some jurisdictions allow clear protections for reports made in good faith, protecting the disclosure of the reporter's name. Innocence should be presumed unless and until evidence establishing guilt is obtained and it must be remembered that only suspicions are being reported.

Some states require reporting of additional categories of mistreatment. For example, Kentucky requires all citizens to report not only suspected abuse and neglect, but also specifically requires reporting of suspected trafficking or female genital mutilation of children.

== Mandated professions ==
States frequently amend their laws, but as of 2019, all States, the District of Columbia, American Samoa, Guam, the Northern Mariana Islands, Puerto Rico, and the U.S. Virgin Islands have statutes identifying persons who are required to report suspected child maltreatment to an appropriate agency.

Approximately 48 states, the District of Columbia, American Samoa, Guam, the Northern Mariana Islands, Puerto Rico, and the Virgin Islands designate professions whose members are mandated by law to report child maltreatment. Mandated professions may include, but are not limited to the following:

- Acupuncturists
- Caregivers
- Clergy, clergy–penitent privileged communication is exempt in most states.
- Counselors and other mental health professionals
- Crisis hotline personnel
- Day care staff
- Dentists and Dental hygienists
- Foster parents
- Medical examiners and coroners
- Health care providers
- Police and other law enforcement officers
- School teachers, coaches, school counselors, principals and other school personnel
- Social workers
- Women's Health clinic practitioners (in some states)
- Film Developers (for child pornography purposes)

As of April 2019, any person who suspects child abuse or neglect is required to report suspected abuse or neglect regardless of profession in 18 States and Puerto Rico. In all other States, territories, and the District of Columbia, any person is permitted to report. These voluntary reporters of abuse are often referred to as "permissive reporters."

== Anonymity and immunity ==
Mandated reporters are usually required to give their name when they make a report, but may request anonymity to protect their privacy. A mandated reporter who knowingly makes a false report will ordinarily have their identity disclosed to the appropriate law enforcement agency, and their identity may be disclosed to the alleged perpetrator of the reported abuse or neglect.

A mandated reporter may be subject to penalties, though immunity from civil or criminal liability is granted to reporters who report in good faith. Immunity is also granted to reporters who, in good faith, have not reported. However, failure to report suspected abuse or neglect could result in fines or other sanctions, such as participation in a training program. Failure to act may result in even stiffer penalties, such as civil litigation or criminal prosecution with the prospect of potential imprisonment.

=== Clergy–penitent privilege and other exemptions ===
Conflicts between a mandated reporter's duties and some privileged communication statutes are common but, in general, attorney–client privileges and clergy–penitent privileges are usually exempt from mandatory reporting. In some states in the US, psychiatrists and PhD psychologists are also exempt from mandatory reporting.

"Clergy–penitent privilege" is privileged communication that protects communication between a member of the clergy and a communicant, who shares information in confidence. When applied, neither the minister nor the "penitent" can be forced to testify in court, by deposition, or other legal proceedings, about the contents of the communication. Most US states provide the privilege, typically in rules of evidence or civil procedure, and the confidentiality privilege has also been extended to non-Catholic clergy and non-Sacramental counseling.

== Investigation of reports ==
Each year in the US approximately 2 million allegations are investigated, affecting 1 out of 16 families in the US with children under 18. Law enforcement or public health agencies are responsible for immediately evaluating all reports of abuse. Referrals in most states are screened to determine which are investigated – many clearly do not constitute abuse or neglect, or provide insufficient information to conduct an investigation. Rates of screening vary considerably between states – some investigate all reports, others screen out between 5% and 78% in this manner.

When reports contain sufficient information to warrant an investigation, authorities must make efforts within a reasonable time frame to begin (and conclude) an effective investigation, particularly when there is an imminent risk of physical harm or another emergency. Agencies should coordinate activities to minimize impacts upon the (possible) victim. In the US in 1985 the Children Advocacy Center model was founded, including "Multi-Discipline Teams" (law enforcement, child protection, prosecution, mental health) to interview, treat, manage and prosecute child abuse cases.

Consent to interview(s) of the (possible) victim often must be obtained from guardians, unless there is reason to believe such person is the alleged perpetrator. In cases where serious abuse or neglect is substantiated, local law enforcement, prosecutors or other public offices must be notified, and a copy of the investigation report must be sent.

US school districts adopted policies, following the 9th Circuit's ruling in Greene v. Camreta, requiring police or state case workers to produce a warrant, court order, parental permission or exigent circumstances prior to interviewing a student on school grounds as part of a sexual abuse investigation.

=== Substantiation by maltreatment type ===
Total U.S. maltreatment substantiation annual rate is less than 1% of U.S. child population (9.3 per 1000 non-duplicates). Of those:

- Neglect is 78.3%
- Physical Abuse is 17.8%
- Sexual Abuse is 9.5%
- Psychological Maltreatment is 7.6%

The % of US children affected annually by substantiated neglect, physical and sexual abuse:

- Neglect – less than ¾ of 1% (74.7 per 10,000)
- Physical Abuse – less than 1/5th of 1% (16.2 per 10,000)
- Sexual Abuse – less than 1/10th of 1% (8.6 per 10,000)

=== Appeals/expunction ===
An attempt to appeal a decision is administrative, involving a review within the CPS agency, by CPS staff. CAPTA requires that states have procedures for expunging records. Procedures for doing so vary and may not be adhered. Ten states do not have provisions.

Arkansas, an originally CAPTA compliant state addressing problems with the Child Maltreatment Registry has laws and procedures to remove one's name from the Central Abuse Registry after one year. (see Arkansas Department of Human Services Policy and Procedure Manual). After an audit from the OIG it was found that multiple reports of abuse were screened out inappropriately.

== Child removals as a result of mandatory reporting ==
CPS can take a child into protective custody with assistance from the police. Each day in the US approximately 700 children are removed from their parents to protect them from alleged abuse or neglect. In 2001, one US child every 5 minutes (approximately 100,000 children) was removed from their family who was later determined not to be maltreated.

Due to the human impact of removal, the law in the US requires it to be used sparingly. The U.S. Supreme Court has held that the Fourteenth Amendment to the U.S. Constitution provides a fundamental right to family integrity, requiring the state to provide notice and a hearing before forcibly separating a parent and child- with the exception of occasions when a child's life or health is in danger. Most removals are done on an emergency basis, bypassing the courts but requiring a post removal hearing.

== Consequences/effects of investigations on children and their families ==
Critics of investigations into reports of child abuse state that

- A child may be wrongfully removed.
- Long, repeated interrogations and physical examinations can leave emotional scars.
- Even if not removed, there may be ongoing fear, distrust and insecurity.
- Long term foster care can leave lasting psychological scars and do irreparable damage to the parent/child bond.
- An accusation of wrongdoing may disrupt a family even if allegations are dismissed. Often, threats and an assumption of guilt over innocence lead to feelings of powerlessness, inadequacy, depression, denial of due process and liberties, reputations tarnished and privacy invaded, and legal consequences if assumed guilty.
- There may be economic harm due to the need to obtain legal representation to defend one's self and comply with the requirements demanded of them. Often, names are listed on CPS Central Registries/databases (different from Sex Abuse Registries) for decades, used for employment and licensing background checks. Frequently an accusation triggers placement of a person's name on the registry without being charged or convicted of a crime, resulting in a registry with "false-positives" entangled with wrongdoers. There is a 1.2–12.3% recidivism rate (repeat substantiations within 6 months of initial substantiations).

== Training ==
Training is typically offered wherever mandated reporting laws are enforced, entailing matters such as recognition of abuse and neglect, what must be reported, how to report it, anonymity, immunity and penalties.

Training programs often use educational materials that use pat phrases and ambiguous indicators: e.g. defining emotional abuse to include the failure to provide a child with "adequate love" or reporting children who are withdrawn or shy as well as children who are friendly to strangers, despite the fact that only a small minority of children who exhibit such behaviors have been abused.

Training is available through a variety of sources. Many local child protective service organizations conduct classroom training. Training is also available through video and web-based courses.

== Criticism ==
Critics state that mandatory reporting may contribute to overloading the child welfare system and exacerbate needless investigations and separations of children from their parents. It is predicted that expanding the list of mandated reporters or creating tougher penalties for failure to report will increase the number of unfounded reports. Mandatory reporting is also criticized because it jeopardizes the ability of people to seek community-based treatment or maintain a therapeutic relationship with professionals for fear of being reported. It has also been criticized for disproportionately affecting African-American families.

Critics also state that much that is now defined as child abuse and neglect (due to vague and broad laws) does not merit governmental interference. Unsubstantiated rates are enormous and go beyond anything reasonably needed and should concern everyone. Emotions about child abuse and sensational media coverage has led to an overreaction by some professionals and citizens, who report many cases that do not amount to child abuse. Eagerness to protect children cannot be allowed to overcome commitment to fairness and due process.

The opioid crisis has brought renewed scrutiny to prenatal substance exposure reporting, an application of mandatory reporting that critics argue undermines the public health response to addiction by deterring pregnant people from seeking treatment. At least twenty-six states require automatic child protective services referrals when an infant is born with prenatal substance exposure, a standard that exceeds the floor set by CAPTA, which requires only service coordination and notification rather than automatic abuse or neglect determinations. Research has found that automatic reporting functions as a significant disincentive to prenatal care, disclosure of substance use to providers, and adherence to medication for opioid use disorder.

High rates of unsubstantiated reports have reinforced these criticisms: in Massachusetts in 2021, only approximately half of prenatal substance exposure reports were ultimately found consistent with abuse or neglect. Several states have responded legislatively. Connecticut, for example, adopted a deidentified notification model associated with declining CPS reports and foster placements, and Massachusetts amended its mandatory reporting statute in 2024 to provide that prenatal substance exposure alone is no longer grounds for a child abuse or neglect referral.

A further criticism is that mandatory reporting laws have had unintended consequences. Individuals, including juveniles, who have never been convicted of anything may be placed on child abuse registries for decades, limiting educational and employment opportunities due to background checks. Unnecessary investigation by professionals (under threat of prosecution) discourages fellow citizens from taking positive neighborhood action with families in trouble, as they may consider that their responsibilities have been met when they call in an anonymous hotline.

Better publicized and widely known use of statistics may have important implication for public policy. In the medical context, reform efforts should prioritize clinical relationships over mandatory reporting infrastructure as provider-patient trust and access to care are more consequential determinants of outcomes than referral rates. More accurate and widely disseminated data on reporting outcomes including high rates of unsubstantiated investigations across mandatory reporting categories could inform reform, reducing unnecessary system involvement while better directing resources toward families with genuine child welfare needs. This would reduce the burden on child protection agencies and would create better outcomes for the children and parents involved.

== See also ==
- Child protection
- Child abuse
- Mandated reporter
