= Kristin Villanueva =

Filipino-American actress

- Born: City of Las Piñas; Philippines
- Citizenship: Philippines; United States
- Education: State University of New York at Purchase (BFA)
- Occupation: Actor
- Years active: 2008–present
- Known for: The Pitt

Kristin Villanueva is a Filipino actress from Manila who is best known for her theatre career and her recurring role as Princess on the HBO Max medical drama The Pitt.

== Personal life ==
Kristin Villanueva was born and raised in Las Piñas in the Philippines. She immigrated to the United States when she was 15 years old and settled in Virginia. She initially practiced ballet to accommodate her asthma, but began acting in a high school program.

She attended SUNY Purchase, where she earned her Bachelor in Fine Arts and was awarded the Chair's Award for Achievement in Acting.

== Career ==
Villanueva took on various small acting and theatre roles throughout her high school and college years, a large number of which occurred during her time at SUNY Purchase, where she studied acting.

In theatre, she has starred as Julia in Two Gentlemen of Verona at the Old Globe Theatre; Elizabeth in Pride and Prejudice with the Playmakers Repertory; Helena in All's Well That Ends Well with Shakespeare & Company; and Dromio of Ephesus and Dromio of Syracuse in The Comedy of Errors at Theatreworks Colorado. She has also worked with NAATCO, Actors Theatre of Louisville, Resident Ensemble Theatre, The Public Theater, and acted at the Nebraska Shakespeare Festival and the Singapore Arts Festival.

In 2025, Villanueva entered the role of Princess, a nurse, in the medical drama The Pitt. She praised the show and the production team for "having done their research" in writing her character. Filipinos make up 4% of the United States' nurses, the largest group of immigrant healthcare workers, while only making up 1% of the general population. Villanueva has several nurses in her extended family, and she mentions that they were "extremely impressed" with the show's attention to detail.

== Filmography ==
Key
†	Denotes films that have not yet been released

Year	Title	Role	Notes	Refs.
2008	Konstruksiyon	Lizabeth Boyd	In the Philippines	
2011	Gossip Girl	Natalie	Episode: "I Am Number Nine"	
2011	Merry Christmas, Eve	Eve	Short film	
2014	The Wordplay Shakespeare a Midsummer Night's Dream	Hermia/Flute/Peasblossom		
2015	Forever	Gaiya	Episode: "Hitler on the Half-Shell"	
2017	First Reformed	Nurse		
2018	Elementary	Maya	Episode: "Nobody Lives Forever"	
2018	Instinct	Woman at Apartment	Episode: "Tribal"	
2018	Viper Club	Camelyn		
2021	Bonding	Sweet Charlotte	5 episodes	
2021	Search Party	Assistant	Episode: "The Imposter"	
2021	Younger	Alessia	2 episodes: "Risky Business", "The F Word"	
2021	Someone Will Assist You Shortly	Bernice	Short film	
2022	That Damn Michael Che	Party Planner #4	Episode: "Black Mediocrity"	
2022	The Courtroom	Elizabeth Keathley		
2022	Troy	Lou	Short film	
2025–present	The Pitt	Princess Dela Cruz	Recurring role; 16 episodes	
2026	Forgotten Island	Tita 1, Tita 3		
TBA	Caravan †	Andrea	Post-production	

== Awards and honors ==
Year	Award	Category	Work	Result	Ref.
2026	Actor Awards	Outstanding Performance by an Ensemble in a Drama Series	The Pitt	Won	
