= List of The Pitt characters =

The Pitt is an American medical drama television series created by R. Scott Gemmill that premiered on Max in January 2025. Each season chronicles a single 15-hour work shift at "the Pitt"—a nickname for the emergency room of the fictional Pittsburgh Trauma Medical Hospital—as the characters attempt to navigate staff shortages, insufficient funding, and their own personal crises. It features an ensemble cast that includes: Noah Wyle, portraying Dr. Michael "Robby" Robinavitch; Tracy Ifeachor, portraying Dr. Heather Collins; Patrick Ball, portraying Dr. Frank Langdon; Katherine LaNasa, portraying charge nurse Dana Evans; Supriya Ganesh, portraying Dr. Samira Mohan; Fiona Dourif, portraying Dr. Cassie McKay; Taylor Dearden, portraying Dr. Melissa "Mel" King; Isa Briones, portraying Dr. Trinity Santos; Gerran Howell, portraying Dr. Dennis Whitaker; Shabana Azeez, portraying medical student Victoria Javadi; and Sepideh Moafi, portraying Dr. Baran Al-Hashimi. The series also features a cast of recurring characters made up of physicians, nurses, social workers, and patients. Some critics praised both the performances and the characters, while others criticized the characterization of the ensemble as cliché.

== Overview ==
List indicator

This section includes main cast members, recurring characters, and notable guest stars.

- A green cell indicates the actor is a main cast member.
- A red cell indicates the actor is a recurring cast member.
- A light blue cell indicates the actor is a guest or special guest cast member.

=== Main ===
| Performer | Character | Seasons | | |
| Performer | Character | 1 | 2 | 3 |
|---|---|---|---|---|
| Noah Wyle | Dr. Michael "Robby" Robinavitch | Main | Main | Main |
| Tracy Ifeachor | Dr. Heather Collins | Main | | |
| Patrick Ball | Dr. Frank Langdon | Main | Main | Main |
| Katherine LaNasa | Dana Evans | Main | Main | Main |
| Supriya Ganesh | Dr. Samira Mohan | Main | Main | |
| Fiona Dourif | Dr. Cassie McKay | Main | Main | Main |
| Taylor Dearden | Dr. Melissa "Mel" King | Main | Main | Main |
| Isa Briones | Dr. Trinity Santos | Main | Main | Main |
| Gerran Howell | Dr. Dennis Whitaker | Main | Main | Main |
| Shabana Azeez | Victoria Javadi | Main | Main | Main |
| Sepideh Moafi | Dr. Baran Al-Hashimi | | Main | Main |
| Ayesha Harris | Dr. Parker Ellis | Recurring | Recurring | Main |

=== Recurring ===
The following is a list of characters that have had a credited appearance as a guest in four or more episodes of the series.

| Performer | Character | Seasons | | |
| Performer | Character | 1 | 2 | 3 |
|---|---|---|---|---|
| Shawn Hatosy | Dr. Jack Abbot | Recurring | Recurring | Recurring |
| Amielynn Abellera | Perlah Alawi | Recurring | Recurring | Recurring |
| Jalen Thomas Brooks | Mateo Diaz | Recurring | Recurring | Recurring |
| Brandon Mendez Homer | Donnie Donahue | Recurring | Recurring | Recurring |
| Kristin Villanueva | Princess Dela Cruz | Recurring | Recurring | Recurring |
| Joanna Going | Theresa Saunders | Recurring | | |
| Deepti Gupta | Dr. Eileen Shamsi | Recurring | Guest | TBD |
| Michael Hyatt | Gloria Underwood | Recurring | | |
| Jackson Kelly | David Saunders | Recurring | | |
| Krystel V. McNeil | Kiara Alfaro | Recurring | | |
| Alexandra Metz | Dr. Yolanda Garcia | Recurring | Recurring | Recurring |
| Drew Powell | Doug Driscoll | Recurring | | |
| Arun Storrs | Minu | Recurring | | |
| Brandon Keener | John Bradley | Recurring | | |
| Ashley Romans | Joyce St. Clair | Recurring | | |
| Samantha Sloyan | Lily Bradley | Recurring | | |
| Mika Abdalla | Jenna | Recurring | | |
| Abby Ryder Fortson | Kristi Wheeler | Recurring | | |
| Marguerite Moreau | Lynette Wheeler | Recurring | | |
| Tracy Vilar | Lupe Perez | Recurring | Recurring | Recurring |
| Shu Lan Tuan | Ginger Kitajima | Recurring | | |
| Robert Heaps | Chad Ashcroft | Recurring | | |
| Ken Kirby | Dr. John Shen | Recurring | Recurring | Recurring |
| Tedra Millan | Dr. Emery Walsh | Recurring | | TBD |
| Charles Baker | Troy Digby | | Recurring | |
| Lesley Boone | Lena Handzo | Guest | Recurring | Recurring |
| Irene Choi | Joy Kwon | | Recurring | TBD |
| Jessica "Limer" Flores | Harlow Graham | | Recurring | |
| Ernest Harden Jr. | Louie Cloverfield | Co-starring | Recurring | |
| Laëtitia Hollard | Emma Nolan | | Recurring | TBD |
| Lucas Iverson | James Ogilvie | | Recurring | TBD |
| Meta Golding | Noelle Hastings | | Recurring | TBD |
| Zack Morris | Jackson Davis | | Recurring | |
| Christopher Thornton | Dr. Caleb Jefferson | | Recurring | TBD |
| Erin Croom | Jada Davis | | Recurring | |
| Brittany Allen | Roxie Hamler | | Recurring | |
| Taylor Handley | Paul Hamler | | Recurring | |
| Tal Anderson | Becca King | Co-starring | Recurring | TBD |
| Rusty Schwimmer | Monica Peters | | Recurring | |
| Jeff Kober | Duke | | Recurring | |
| Luke Tennie | Dr. Crus Henderson | | Recurring | Recurring |
| Sofia Hasmik | Nazely Toomarian | | Recurring | Recurring |

== Main characters ==
=== Dr. Michael "Robby" Robinavitch ===
Dr. Michael "Robby" Robinavitch (Noah Wyle) is the longtime senior attending physician at the Pitt. He is a talented but sometimes reckless and irascible physician with a sharp wit and intense dedication to his patients and his team, which earns him the respect of the doctors and nurses, but often the ire of the hospital's administrators. Robby carries intense trauma from losing his mentor, Dr. Adamson, during the COVID-19 pandemic, and avoids working a shift on the anniversary of Adamson's death prior to the events of the first season.

In season 1, Robby arrives for a shift at the Pitt on the fourth anniversary of Adamson's death and spends the day leading an overcrowded, understaffed ER while clashing with hospital leadership over systemic problems. Robby is shattered to learn that Dr. Frank Langdon, his longtime protege, has been stealing benzodiazepenes from the hospital. After a local music festival mass shooting sends a wave of victims into the hospital, Robby helps lead the emergency response but is devastated when he cannot save Leah, the girlfriend of Jake Malloy, the son of his ex-girlfriend with whom he has a paternal bond. The trauma of the shooting and unresolved grief over Adamson's death culminate in Robby suffering a panic attack, but he ultimately returns to finish the shift and is later comforted by Dana and Jack Abbot.

In season 2, set ten months later on the Fourth of July, Robby begins what is meant to be his final shift before a three-month sabbatical he intends to spend riding a motorcycle cross-country, but quickly finds himself under pressure. He clashes with his interim replacement Dr. Baran Al-Hashimi, and remains distant and resentful toward Langdon (who returns after rehab). As the shift continues, Robby is deeply affected by several patients and repeatedly brushes off concerns about his increasingly erratic behavior, unresolved PTSD, and possible suicidal ideation driving his desire to take a sabbatical. His colleagues, including Dana, Abbot, McKay, as well as his motorcyclist friend Duke Ekins, grow alarmed as Robby spirals. Robby eventually admits to Duke that he is suicidal and that the hospital provides the only distraction from his thoughts. Both Abbot and Langdon urge Robby to seek help; Robby admits to Abbot that the constant death he witnesses on the job has taken a toll on his psyche and deprived him of the will to live, but Abbot reminds them of the value of their work and encourages Robby to take a safer trip than a motorcycle ride. Robby goes to check on a baby abandoned in the ER earlier that day and bonds with the child, with he himself having been abandoned by his mother when he was eight years old; Robby reassures the baby, and himself, that life has much left to offer.

=== Dr. Heather Collins ===
Dr. Heather Collins (Tracy Ifeachor) is a senior resident. She worked in finance but transitioned to medicine after the 2008 financial crisis. She dated Robby before the start of the series, but they seemingly split on good terms despite clashing sometimes in the ER. She later decided to get pregnant by IVF. Over the course of the first season, Collins suffers a miscarriage and confides in Robby, also confessing that she became pregnant during a previous relationship but decided to get an abortion without her partner's knowledge. Robby reassures her and invites her to go home to rest, leading to her absence in the last four episodes during the mass casualty incident (MCI). Wyle spoke about the necessity of keeping Collins away at the end of the shift, saying that the team wanted to dismantle Robby's support system in his moment of crisis and that Collins might have been "one of those voices that could have reached [Robby], and we didn't want him to be reachable". Collins does not appear in the second season, having completed her residency and moved back to take an attending position in her hometown of Portland, Oregon. In the second season, Whitaker says that she was adopting a child and wanted to be closer to her family.

=== Dr. Frank Langdon ===
Dr. Frank Langdon (Patrick Ball) is a senior resident and Robby's protégé. Langdon loves his job but struggles to handle his responsibilities both professionally and personally. He is married to his wife, Abby, and they have two young children, Tanner and Penny. Ball described Langdon's effort to compartmentalize his emotions at work by saying: "I think he's somebody who can't be aware of the emotional impact of what he's doing. You can't be aware of like, 'oh, this is somebody's son, or this is somebody's wife, or this is somebody's brother.' You have to think, this is a body, this is a problem." In the ER, he has a close relationship with his mentor Robby, bonds with Mel over the weight of their caretaker roles, and clashes with Santos over her apparent disrespect of authority. In the tenth episode of the first season, Robby discovers that Langdon has been stealing pain medication from the hospital to feed his addiction to benzodiazepines, which had been first prescribed to him to treat an injury to his back. Ball described Langdon and Robby's confrontation as "the closest thing you're going to get to a break-up scene in The Pitt". Ball found out about Langdon's drug addiction at his first screen test, where he acted out the confrontation with Wyle for the first time. Ball said about the scene: "As far as what grace is given, in this scene you have two men that are equally as traumatized and equally as incapable of tending their own wounds and they're trying to help each other to an extent. For certain people it's a lot easier to give help than take it, so I think that's what we see."

=== Dana Evans ===
Dana Evans (Katherine LaNasa) is the day-shift charge nurse. Dana lost her mother when she was sixteen years old and began volunteering at the hospital in high school, dedicating over thirty years to working in the Pitt. She comes from a large family, is married to her husband Benji, and has two daughters. LaNasa said she appreciated and related to Dana's motherly but strong personality when reading the script. She sent an audition tape to The Pitt and The Righteous Gemstones at the same time, later receiving a callback for The Pitt. After getting the role, she shadowed nurse Kathy Garvin at the Los Angeles General Medical Center and consulted on set with Tim Van Pelt, a real-life charge nurse that appeared in the series. LaNasa said she primarily based the character on Garvin and her aunt. In particular, she observed Garvin's relationship with regular patients and her compassionate treatment of patients and staff. In the ninth episode, Dana gets assaulted by a patient and decides to quit. LaNasa explained her decision by saying: "Working at the hospital was a great source of meaning and pride for Dana... to have someone violate her in that way, in one punch, he really takes everything away from her. It was a very degrading experience." Dana comes back in the second season.

=== Dr. Samira Mohan ===
Dr. Samira Mohan (Supriya Ganesh) is a third-year medical resident trying to find balance between diligence and speed. Methodical and caring, she tackles the ER's chaos with a focus on getting things right, sometimes at the cost of speed. Her empathy makes her a patient favorite, but her cautious approach can put her at odds with senior staff.

=== Dr. Cassie McKay ===
Dr. Cassie McKay (Fiona Dourif) is a 42-year-old second-year resident. A former addict now working to rebuild her life, she balances the demands of emergency medicine with being a devoted divorced mother to her 11-year-old son, Harrison. She experiences problems with an ankle monitor throughout season one.

=== Dr. Melissa "Mel" King ===
Dr. Melissa "Mel" King (Taylor Dearden) is a neurodivergent second-year resident. Mel begins her first shift at the Pitt at the start of the season, having previously worked at a medical facility run by the Department of Veterans Affairs. She lost both of her parents at a young age, consequently becoming the primary caretaker for her autistic twin sister, Becca. The writers initially wanted to implicitly have Mel be on the autistic spectrum, but abandoned the idea after casting a non-autistic actress, Dearden. Dearden convinced them to have Mel be neurodivergent, using her own experiences living with ADHD to inform the character. She related to Mel's neurodivergent traits and explained her approach to playing the character by saying: "I was like, well, I'm going to play everything I mask." In the series, Mel is shown while self-soothing and stimming. Dearden also proposed to Wyle to have Mel be able to hyperfocus in moments of crisis. Dearden played against type, having previously portrayed mostly sarcastic and irreverent characters. She had to figure out how to portray a "peppy" character like Mel, ending up drawing on her anxiety. In the ER, Mel tries to connect with Robby, but instead finds a mentor in Langdon. Dearden said of their relationship: "Mel comes in, so ready to learn, and just wanting someone to just go, 'Let me scoop you up and just be your mentor.' And I think Langdon has always just wanted to mentor someone, and no one lets him." Mel gains confidence throughout the first season, worrying less about protocol and becoming an advocate for patients.

=== Dr. Trinity Santos ===
Dr. Trinity Santos (Isa Briones) is an ambitious and confident intern. Santos starts her first shift at the Pitt at the beginning of the series. She is an ex-gymnast of Filipino descent. Being herself half Filipino, Briones advocated for Santos to be of Filipino ancestry and have a Filipino surname, wanting to represent a category often absent from medical series. Briones collaborated with the writers to showcase part of her own experience as a mixed white-passing person, creating a scene in which Filipino nurses Princess and Perlah gossip about Santos, unaware that she can understand them as she also speaks Tagalog. Briones said that Santos's experience in gymnastics instilled in her the need to be the best in her field and shaped her personality, explaining her competitiveness and defensiveness. After the traumatic experience, she decided to choose a different career path. In the ER, Santos presents as cocky and eager to get ahead of her peers and flaunt her skills by choosing only complex cases, while sometimes questioning her superiors' authority. Santos finds an ally in resident Dr. Yolanda Garcia, while she often clashes with Langdon due to their similar strong-willed personalities and her disrespect of his authority. Throughout the first season, she investigates and ends up uncovering his drug addiction. In the second half of the season, Santos begins to show her vulnerability and talk about past struggles: she threatens a man suspected of molesting his teenage daughter, hinting in the process at her own experience with sexual abuse; and she convinces a suicidal patient to seek help by talking about her friend who died by suicide. In Season 2, Santos is now a second-year resident and is having a casual relationship with Garcia.

=== Dr. Dennis Whitaker ===
Dr. Dennis Whitaker (Gerran Howell) is a fourth-year medical student. Whitaker starts his rotation at the beginning of the series. Whitaker was born in a large, religious family from Broken Bow, Nebraska, and has an undergraduate degree in theology, but he later came to have a strained relationship with religion. Howell, a Welsh actor, adopted an American accent for the role. Whitaker struggles on his first day at the Pitt, feeling overwhelmed by the reality of working in a busy hospital in a big city as opposed to living in a small rural community. In the second episode, the death of a patient deeply affects him, but he shows resilience and gains confidence throughout the first season. He occasionally serves as comic relief, catching rats in the ER and being showered in bodily fluids numerous times. In the Pitt, Whitaker connects with Robby and Mohan, who coach him and remind him to remain empathetic. He also develops a sibling-like relationship with Santos, who invites him to live with her when she discovers in the season finale that he is homeless and squatting in the hospital. Howell said that Whitaker was initially scared of her, but he came to understand that Santos uses sarcasm as a coping mechanism. He is shown to be oblivious when a nurse tries to flirt with him. Whitaker became an intern in the second season.

=== Victoria Javadi ===
Victoria Javadi (Shabana Azeez) is a 20-year-old third-year medical student. Javadi starts her rotation in the Pitt at the beginning of the series. Having started college at thirteen years old, Javadi is a child prodigy but she has difficulty socializing. Both of her parents are well-known and respected doctors at the hospital. Her mother, attending surgeon Dr. Eileen Shamsi, frequently embarrasses her by lecturing her in the ER. Javadi starts standing up to her mother and overcoming her insecurities and her fear of blood throughout the first season. She also becomes infatuated with nurse Mateo Diaz, asking him out during the shift.

=== Dr. Baran Al-Hashimi ===
Dr. Baran Al-Hashimi (Sepideh Moafi) is a new attending physician at the Pitt who arrives as Robby's interim replacement ahead of his sabbatical. Al-Hashimi is shown having strange blackouts at several points. It is later revealed that Al-Hashimi has been living with a seizure disorder for 35 years after fighting viral meningitis as a child. She is divorced and has one son.

=== Dr. Parker Ellis ===
Dr. Parker Ellis (Ayesha Harris) is a senior resident mainly working during the night shift at the Pitt.

== Recurring characters ==
=== Hospital staff ===
==== Dr. Jack Abbot ====
Dr. Jack Abbot (Shawn Hatosy) is a night shift attending physician at The Pitt. An old friend and confidant of Robby, Abbot is a former military doctor who served and was wounded overseas, as well as a widower. He also volunteers with the Pittsburgh Police as a SWAT Physician. Like Robby, Abbot often resorts to reckless and improvisational tactics to save patients, but is shown to be shrewd, highly competent, and charismatic, and credits therapy with helping him cope with the trauma of his past and his work as a physician.

Abbot is first seen standing at the edge of the roof at end of his shift, feeling despondent over the death of a patient who served in the military; Robby convinces him to return downstairs. Abbot later arrives early alongside several other night shift staff to help Robby and the day shift treat victims of a mass shooting at Pitt Fest, having received news of the incident via police scanner. Abbot's experience practicing combat-zone medicine proves invaluable during the mass casualty, with Abbot himself having brought several tools (such as portable ultrasound and cricothyrotomy kits) that expedite the staff's work when their resources are quickly depleted. At the end of the shift, Abbot finds Robby standing on the edge of the roof, reeling from the death of Leah, the girlfriend of his de facto stepson Jake, and feeling like a failure for having a panic attack during the shift; Abbot assures Robby that he performed excellently, and stresses the importance of their work, convincing Robby to leave with him. The two share beers in the park across from the hospital with other staff; Abbot is revealed to be an amputee, having lost his leg while serving in the military.

Abbot returns in season 2 midway through the day shift with an officer who was wounded during a SWAT raid, and helps Robby and his staff save him. Mohan helps Abbot bandage a minor wound he suffered during the raid, and tells Abbot about her patient, Orlando Diaz, who left the hospital against medical advice due to mounting medical debts; Abbot offers to personally pay for medical supplies to be delivered to Orlando's home via Uber. Abbot also assists in treating obese patient Howard Knox, and accompanies him to a neighboring hospital for scans before going home to rest prior to the night shift. Abbot returns for the night shift to serve as attending alongside Shen. He and Robby work together to save pregnant mother Judith Lastrade and her newborn after she suffers pre-eclampsia while attempting a freebirth. Afterwards, Abbot has an emotional conversation with Robby, who has become suicidal due to years of ignoring his mental health struggles while allowing the constant death he witnesses on the job to take a toll on him. Abbot stresses the importance of therapy, telling Robby that it helped him come to terms with the loss of his leg and later his wife, and recommends that Robby take a safer trip than riding a motorcycle helmetless.

==== Perlah Alawi ====
Perlah Alawi (Amielynn Abellera) is a nurse working in the ER. She is close with fellow nurse Princess Dela Cruz who, like her, is of Filipino ancestry, and the two are often heard gossiping with each other in Tagalog about the goings-on at the hospital. In season 2, Perlah is deeply shaken by the death of regular patient Louie Cloverfield, prompting Dana to take over for her in preparing Louie's body for viewing. She and Dana later share a tender embrace while watching the Fourth of July fireworks from the hospital's roof.

==== Mateo Diaz ====
Mateo Diaz (Jalen Thomas Brooks) is a nurse working in the ER. Brooks described Mateo as a level-headed and humorous nurse that looks out for the doctors. Javadi is instantly attracted to him upon meeting him and asks him out on a date that day, but he gently declines, telling her he does not date coworkers. He comes to admire Javadi over the course of their first shift together, especially when she improvises treatment plans under pressure during a mass casualty incident when the hospital is short on supplies. He brings Javadi along to have beers with the staff after the shift ends.

Mateo returns in season 2 as part of the night shift staff on July 4.

==== Donnie Donahue ====
Donnie Donahue (Brandon Mendez Homer) is a nurse, and later nurse practitioner, working in the ER. Mendez Homer said that he developed the character on set by building Donnie's relationship with the main cast and talking with medical consultants. Mendez Homer based his reaction to the MCI on his experience witnessing and helping medical providers during the bombing at Boston Marathon in 2013. In season 2, he is father to a newborn baby, and his experience as a parent helps him care for a baby found abandoned in the ER restroom.

==== Princess Dela Cruz ====
Princess Dela Cruz (Kristin Villanueva) is a nurse working in the ER. She is close with Perlah, the two often gossiping with each other in Tagalog. Princess is a polyglot & speaks 6 different languages, including some sign language which she uses to help Dr Santos with a patient in Season 2.

==== Dr. Eileen Shamsi ====
Dr. Eileen Shamsi (Deepti Gupta) is Javadi's mother and an attending surgeon at the hospital. She often comes to the Pitt to lecture her daughter, embarrassing her. She puts pressure on Javadi to pursue surgery over emergency medicine, but Javadi proves her capabilities while treating victims of the Pitt Fest mass shooting, and stands up to her mother's condescension when Shamsi scorns the improvised tactics the doctors are forced to adopt in the absence of resources. Shamsi and Javadi remain distant in season 2, with Shamsi unsuccessfully trying to persuade Robby to allow Javadi to pursue a career outside the ER. Shamsi performs an emergency surgery with her daughter's assistance on patient Austin Green after his abdominal aortic aneurysm ruptures.

==== Gloria Underwood ====
Gloria Underwood (Michael Hyatt) is the chief medical officer of the hospital. She often clashes with Robby. who criticizes her for prioritizing bureaucratic concerns such as patient satisfaction scores over quality of care, and urges her to address the hospital's perennial staff shortages. Gloria proves dependable during a mass casualty event following a shooting at Pitt Fest, providing Robby with all the resources he asks for. However, she later admonishes him again upon learning that staff donated their own blood, and that Robby let a potential suspect in the shooting go free earlier in the day despite concerns; Robby finally snaps and loudly berates Gloria in front of the whole staff. At the end of the shift, Gloria commends the Pitt's staff for their heroism in responding to the mass casualty.

==== Kiara Alfaro ====
Kiara Alfaro (Krystel V. McNeil) is a social worker at the Pitt.

==== Dr. Yolanda Garcia ====
Dr. Yolanda Garcia (Alexandra Metz) is a confident resident in the department of general surgery at the hospital who often assists in the ER. She recognizes Santos's talent and begins to mentor her, despite disliking teaching. Metz said she researched the hospital hierarchy with the help of a physician friend for the role. She was inspired by physicians that she knows in her life. Metz said that Garcia did not listen to Santos's concerns about Langdon due to her respect for chain of command, wanting Santos to go to Robby first. Garcia frequently banters with Langdon and subtly flirts with Santos throughout the latter's first shift, though tension briefly arises from Santos accidentally dropping a scalpel on Garcia's foot. In season 2, Garcia and Santos are now having casual sex; it is hinted that both want more from the relationship. She reiterates the casual nature of their relationship to Santos after she asks about their plans later that night then tells Santos she will contact her the next day. Garcia reprimands Santos for her dismissive attitude towards Langdon while treating a patient; Santos later privately confides to Garcia her resentment over being treated like a pariah for reporting Langdon for stealing drugs from the hospital, but Garcia counters that Santos is being ostracized because of her general hostility towards others.

==== Lupe Perez ====
Lupe Perez (Tracy Vilar) is a ward clerk working at the Pitt. During the Pitt Fest shooting, Lupe and social worker Kiara Alfaro set up an area in the hospital for victims' families to identify them based on patient photos. In season 2, Lupe sees several of her fellow Hispanic coworkers fleeing the hospital after ICE agents arrive with an injured detainee.

==== Dr. John Shen ====
Dr. John Shen (Ken Kirby) is an attending physician working the night shift at the Pitt. He joins the hospital staff during the MCI at the end of the first season, triaging patients. Unlike his more intense counterparts Robby and Abbot, Shen has a casual and laidback demeanor, known for bringing an iced coffee with him to work, and is shown to perform competently under pressure. In season 2, Shen is the sole attending overseeing the shift the night before July 4, and hands off their patients to Robby. He returns later that night alongside Abbot and oversees several cases, including an asthmatic teenager suffering a pneumothorax, and a pregnant mother suffering pre-eclampsia while attempting a freebirth.

==== Dr. Emery Walsh ====
Dr. Emery Walsh (Tedra Millan) is an attending surgeon working the night shift. She joins the hospital staff during the MCI at the end of the first season, managing the surgical department. Like Garcia, she has an abrasive and sarcastic personality, and clashes with Abbot over his improvised tactics to treat victims of the shooting.

==== Lena Handzo ====
Lena Handzo (Lesley Boone) is the night-shift charge nurse who also works as a death doula. She assumes the latter role for the family of Roxie Hamler, a woman with advanced lung cancer who arrives at the ER on July 4, and helps Roxie's husband and children come to terms with her impending death.

==== Joy Kwon ====
Joy Kwon (Irene Choi) is a third-year medical student who trains under Whitaker alongside Ogilvie. Joy behaves aloof during the early hours of the July 4 shift, her disinterest often a product of being overshadowed by the arrogant Ogilvie. She later devises a plan for uninsured patient Orlando Diaz to be treated at a far lower cost, and opens up to Mohan about the death of her grandmother and her subsequent discomfort with emergency medicine. When the hospital's computer systems are shut down amid a cyberattack, Joy uses her photographic memory to help staff reconstruct the patient chart on a whiteboard. Joy leaves at the end of her shift despite Langdon admonishing her to stay overtime to help, stressing to him the importance of boundaries given the high rate of burnout amid ER doctors.

==== Emma Nolan ====
Emma Nolan (Laëtitia Hollard) is a recent nursing school graduate working in the ER, whom Dana mentors. Despite her initial shyness and anxiety around working in an ER environment, Emma is shown to be a skilled and empathetic nurse, particularly when caring for a homeless patient, Digby, and helping Dana collect a rape kit from a sexual assault victim. At the start of Emma's shift, Dana warns her about the high rates of assault of nurses by patients and informs her of the hospital's code word, "hula hoop", for such emergencies; Emma is indeed assaulted later in her shift when Curtis Larson, a golfer who became belligerent after combining alcohol with cocaine, awakes from sedation in a disoriented state and puts Emma in a chokehold while she is checking his vitals. Dana saves Emma by subduing Larson with Versed; Emma insists on staying to complete her shift, telling Dana she is not a quitter.

==== James Ogilvie ====
James Ogilvie (Lucas Iverson) is a well-read but arrogant fourth-year medical student who trains under Whitaker alongside Joy. He has a strained relationship with his father, an English teacher who disapproves of his career in medicine. Ogilvie's pompousness and insensitivity towards patients frequently irk the other staff, including his fellow medical student Joy, who feels overshadowed by him, and McKay, who chastises him for making judgmental comments about an obese patient's weight and later a homeless woman's drug addiction. Ogilvie nearly kills a patient by removing an embedded shard of glass in his body, causing severe bleeding; Robby instructs him never to remove foreign bodies on his own. Ogilvie later bonds with patient Austin Green, who, like Ogilvie's father, is an English teacher; however, Green suffers a rupture of an abdominal aortic aneurysm that Ogilvie and Mohan failed to detect. Ogilvie accompanies Green to surgery, where he ultimately dies. Whitaker finds Ogilvie emotionally devastated in the ambulance bay, and comforts him by telling him about the death of his patient on his own first day. Ogilvie doubts whether he can handle the emergency department and contemplates a move to primary or pediatric care, but Whitaker tells him to go home and rest before making any major career decisions.

==== Noelle Hastings ====
Noelle Hastings (Meta Golding) is a nurse and case manager in the ER who is casually dating Robby. She, Mohan, and Joy work together to devise a coverage plan for Orlando Diaz, an uninsured patient, that significantly reduces his out-of-pocket costs. She later bids farewell to Robby for his sabbatical.

==== Dr. Caleb Jefferson ====
Dr. Caleb Jefferson (Christopher Thornton) is a psychiatrist. Robby repeatedly blows off Caleb's attempts to speak with him during his last shift before a planned sabbatical, and Caleb unsuccessfully recommends to Robby that he retry therapy. Caleb also diagnoses Jackson Davis, a patient brought in after an outburst at his college library, with possible schizophrenia and manage his symptoms with droperidol. At the end of his shift, Caleb chastises Robby for openly speculating that patient Orlando Diaz attempted suicide, and offers Robby his phone number in case he wants to talk while on his sabbatical.

==== Monica Peters ====
Monica Peters (Rusty Schwimmer) is a retired hospital clerk who Dana calls to help manage paperwork during a system shutdown. Though longtime friends with Dana, Monica is gruff and rude to much of the other staff, such as Javadi, and is shown to harbor racist and antiquated attitudes. She eventually leaves about an hour after the hospital systems are restored.

=== Patients and relatives ===
==== Theresa Saunders ====
Theresa Saunders (Joanna Going) is a middle-aged patient. She arrived at the ER after having made herself sick, hoping to get help for her son David.

==== David Saunders ====
David Saunders (Jackson Kelly) is Theresa's troubled teenaged son. He has demonstrated violent tendencies towards women.

==== Doug Driscoll ====
Doug Driscoll (Drew Powell) is a patient that becomes increasingly angry throughout the first season as he continues to be stuck in the waiting room for hours. He eventually causes a scene and nearly storms out after having an outburst at Dana and Javadi, but Langdon informs him that he would be leaving against medical advice (AMA) and hands him a form to sign to clear the hospital of liability. Shortly afterwards, Doug punches Dana in the face in the ambulance bay while she is taking a break, and throws the signed AMA form at her. Police later arrest Doug, and staff encourage Dana to press charges. Dana is left deeply traumatized by the assault and nearly quits working at the Pitt because of it.

==== Minu ====
Minu (Arun Storrs) is a Nepali woman. She arrives at the ER along with her rescuer after being pushed onto subway tracks.

==== John Bradley ====
John Bradley (Brandon Keener) is the father of a braindead teenager, Nick. John and his wife Lily slowly accept the death of their son throughout the first season and end up giving their consent for organ donation.

==== Joyce St. Claire ====
Joyce St. Claire (Ashley Romans) is a woman with sickle cell disease. She arrives at the ER in extreme pain and asks for drugs, leading to her being initially mistaken for an addict due to racial bias. Mohan orders her freed and accurately diagnoses her symptoms, later attributing her knowledge of it to her work studying racial disparities in healthcare.

==== Lily Bradley ====
Lily Bradley (Samantha Sloyan) is the mother of a braindead teenager, Nick. Lily and her husband John slowly accept the death of their son throughout the first season and end up giving their consent for organ donation.

==== Jenna ====
Jenna (Mika Abdalla) is a college student. She arrives at the ER while experiencing an overdose, after having taken a Xanax laced with fentanyl with her friend Nick to fall asleep.

==== Kristi Wheeler ====
Kristi Wheeler (Abby Ryder Fortson) is a pregnant teenager. She arrives at the ER with her aunt for a scheduled medical abortion.

==== Lynette Wheeler ====
Lynette Wheeler (Marguerite Moreau) is Kristi's aunt. She pretended to be Kristi's mother to allow her to get an abortion.

==== Ginger Kitajima ====
Ginger Kitajima (Shu Lan Tuan) is an elderly patient with schizophrenia. She arrives at the ER with her daughter and caretaker Rita after having fallen and broken her arm.

==== Chad Ashcroft ====
Chad Ashcroft (Robert Heaps) is McKay's immature ex and Harrison's father. He has a conflictual relationship with McKay. Chad arrives at the ER with a broken bone and witnesses the MCI, feeling shocked by the carnage.

==== Troy Digby ====
Troy Digby (Charles Baker) is a homeless man who comes to the ER seeking to remove a cast from his arm. After other patients in the waiting room complain about his foul odor, Digby is admitted as a patient and given a shower by Dana and Emma. Mohan subsequently cuts open Digby's arm cast to reveal maggots living underneath, his wound having become infected. Staff treat his infection, and Dana and Emma later give Digby a shave and a haircut, leaving him emotional both with gratitude for the nurses and distress that his family will not recognize him. Digby reveals that he has an adult daughter who lives in his former home; Emma, who learns that Digby danced with his daughter at her wedding, assures him that his daughter will always remember him.

==== Harlow Graham ====
Harlow Graham (Jessica "Limer" Flores) is a deaf patient suffering from neck pain. After Harlow's interpreter is called away on an emergency, hospital staff struggle to communicate with her while awaiting a new interpreter; a VRI is used until a system shutdown renders it non-functional, and Santos unsuccessfully tries to use a pen and paper as an alternative. A new in-person interpreter eventually arrives; Santos learns that Harlow's neck pain comes from poor posture while working on her laptop, and administers a local anesthetic. Santos later expresses guilt for the amount of time it took to treat Harlow for what was ultimately a simple diagnosis.

==== Louie Cloverfield ====
Louie Cloverfield (Ernest Harden Jr.) is a patient who frequents the ER and has severe alcoholism.

==== Jackson Davis ====
Jackson Davis (Zack Morris) is a patient brought to the ER in a psychotic state after having an outburst at his college library while studying for the bar exam. Jackson was illegally tased in the neck by security guard Tony Chinchiolo; Mel and Robby remove the taser barbs. Jackson's symptoms are treated with droperidol by psychiatrist Caleb Jefferson, and his sister Jada arrives, distressed over his condition and shocked to learn of his outburst. Upon awakening, Jackson tells Caleb of voices he was hearing. Jackson's parents later arrive; the family is informed that Jackson may be suffering from schizophrenia. Javadi introduces Jackson's family to Nicole Steadman, a parent-support advocate, who helps them come to terms with their son's mental-health issues; Jackson's father eventually admits that the death of his brother (Jackson's uncle) was a suicide, suggesting a family history of mental illness.

==== Roxie Hamler ====
Roxie Hamler (Brittany Allen) is a patient with advanced lung cancer.

==== Paul Hamler ====
Paul Hamler (Taylor Handley) is Roxie's husband.

==== Becca King ====
Becca King (Tal Anderson) is Mel's autistic sister. She lives in an assisted-living facility, with Mel frequently visiting her to make sure she is taken care of; one of their favorite activities is watching the film Elf, which Becca has watched over a hundred times. In season 2, Becca comes to the ER reporting abdominal pain; Langdon examines her and learns she has a urinary tract infection, which Becca admits to Mel is likely a result of having sex with her boyfriend Adam, who Becca met in assisted living and whom Mel was unaware of. Mel is shocked by the news and angrily pressures Becca to divulge more details of the relationship, making Becca cry; Mel later apologizes and learns from Becca that her relationship with Adam is consensual and self-directed, making Mel resent her sister's happiness amidst her own loneliness. While leaving, Becca declines to watch the July 4 fireworks with Mel as they usually do, and instead spends the night at Adam's family's house.

==== Duke ====
Duke (Jeff Kober) is a motorcycle engineer and old friend of Robby. After Duke complains about hoarseness in his throat, Robby has him come in for a check-up on his last shift before a sabbatical he plans to spend riding his motorcycle cross-country. Duke's X-ray detects an enlarged mediastinum; Robby delays leaving for trip until CT scan results arrive. Duke notices Robby behaving erratically and infers that he feels a compulsion to stay in the ER despite the toll it takes on him and his desire to escape.

The CT scan reveals that Duke has an ascending aortic aneurysm that will require surgery and months of aftercare, with a 50% chance of death otherwise. Duke helps fix Robby's motorcycle after an ambulance accidentally knocks it over, and has an honest conversation with him afterwards, where Robby finally admits that he is suicidal and that his sabbatical is an attempt to escape his anguish. Duke asks Robby whether running away is the legacy he wants to leave for his students. He and Robby shake hands before he departs, with Duke making Robby promise to return from his trip.

== Other characters ==
=== Hospital staff ===
- Jesse Van Horn (Ned Brower) is a nurse working in the ER. In season 2, Jesse is detained by ICE agents after intervening when they aggressively remove an injured detainee before she can finish receiving treatment. Staff work to track Jesse's whereabouts, but are informed that PTMC's lawyers are busy dealing with the aftermath of the cyberattack on nearby hospitals and will not be able to attend to Jesse's case anytime soon.
- Dylan Easton (Becca Blackwell) is a social worker covering for Kiara on July 4th.
- Dr. Raymond Javadi (Usman Ally) is an endocrinologist and Victoria's father.
- Trent Norris (Victor Rivas Rivers) is the chief executive officer of the Pittsburgh Trauma Medical Center.
- Dr. Crus Henderson (Luke Tennie) is a talented fourth-year resident working on the night shift. He devises a way to diagnose several musculoskeletal injuries using ultrasound alone, eliminating the need for labs and X-rays, and tells Mohan he has applied for the hospital's competitive ultrasound fellowship.
- Dr. Nazely Toomarian (Sofia Hasmik) is an intern of Armenian descent working on the night shift on July 4th.
- Dr. Brendon Park (Lou Ferrigno Jr.) is an intimidating orthopedic surgeon, nicknamed "Park the Shark".
- Dr. Linda Conley (Mary McCormack) is the PTMC's chief neurosurgeon. She mentored Dr. Eileen Shamsi during her residency, when Shamsi was pregnant with her daughter, Victoria Javadi; she also gently encourages Victoria during a surgical procedure.
- Dr. Clay Barrett (Geoffrey Owens) is a cardiothoracic surgeon.
- Sam Garvin (Jona Xiao) is an obstetrics nurse.

=== Patients and relatives ===
- Jeremy Spencer (Mackenzie Astin) is Helene's brother and the son of an elderly patient brought in the ER from a nursing home. Jeremy initially wants to allow his father a natural death, but Helene convinces him to override his advance directive and have him be intubated. After talking with Robby, Jeremy and Helene agree to let their father be extubated and grieve at his bedside.
- Helene Spencer (Rebecca Tilney) is Jereme's sister and the daughter of an elderly patient brought in the ER from a nursing home. Helene convinces her brother to override their father's advance directive and have him be intubated. After talking with Robby, the siblings agree to let their father be extubated and grieve at his bedside.
- Jake Malloy (Taj Speights) is the son of Robby's ex-girlfriend Janey Malloy; Robby views him as a son.
- Piper Fisher (Courtney Grosbeck) is a patient brought in for a sexually transmitted infection by a woman named Laura who claims to be her boss. McKay suspects that Piper is a victim of sex trafficking.
- Laura Fisher (Shani Atias) is Piper's controlling boss, who McKay suspects is trafficking Piper for sex.
- Neil McKay (Brad Dourif) is Cassie's father who arrives in the ER to take her son home.
- Janey Malloy (Sarah Jane Morris) is Robby's ex-girlfriend and Jake's mother.
- Evelyn Bostick (Jayne Taini) is a patient with Alzheimer's whose husband Ethan dies in the hospital shortly before she too is brought in as a patient.
- Kylie Conners (Annabelle Toomey) is a 9-year-old patient brought into the ER by her father's girlfriend after suffering a chin injury from falling down the stairs. Santos notices bruises across Kylie's body, collects a urine sample from her containing hematuria, and suspects that her father is abusing her. Kylie's father becomes irate upon being accused of abuse; Dana breaks up the confrontation by announcing that Kylie was found to have a low platelet count, indicating immune thrombocytopenic purpura that explains her bruising.
- Orlando Diaz (William Guirola) is a construction worker who arrives at the ER unconscious after a fall and is diagnosed with severe diabetic ketoacidosis, which Mohan learns was caused by Orlando rationing insulin after losing his health insurance. Mohan and the team stabilize him and devise a treatment plan that drastically lowers Orlando's out-of-pocket costs, but Orlando grows increasingly distressed about his mounting medical debt, and refuses to let his daughter start a GoFundMe for financial assistance. Orlando ultimately leaves before completing treatment, but is later brought back to the ER hours later after having suffered a worse fall, resulting in a basilar skull fracture and possible severe brain damage. Mohan feels responsible for not doing enough to convince him to stay, but Robby tells her not to blame herself, suggesting that Orlando attempted suicide due to his debt.
- Yana Kovalenko (Irina Dubova) is a patient brought in on July 4 after burning her hand upon dropping a samovar. Yana bonds with Robby over their shared Jewish faith, while chiding him over his plan to take a three-month sabbatical riding a motorcycle.
- Brian Hancock (Lawrence Robinson) is a patient with a soccer injury who asks McKay out on a date, which she accepts.
- Lloyd Wilkins (John Getz) is Roxie's father.
- Cora Wilkins (Bonita Friedericy) is Roxie's mother.
- Ilana Miller (Tina Ivlev) is a sexual assault victim. Dana and Emma gently examine her and collect her DNA samples for rape kit. Dana is emotionally moved by the experience, especially after Ilana thanks her for being there on a traumatic day. Dana is later enraged to find another rape kit in storage that the police failed to collect for two weeks.
- Austin Green (Johnny Sneed) an English professor at Point Park University who presents to the ER with left flank pain consistent with a recurrent kidney stone. Ogilvie, whose father is also an English teacher, bonds with Green and gives him a copy of James Baldwin's Notes of a Native Son to read while awaiting discharge. However, Green suffers a ruptured abdominal aortic aneurysm that Ogilvie and Mohan failed to detect and dies in the operating room, leaving Ogilvie devastated.
- Derek Foster (David Fumero) is the victim of a waterslide collapse that leaves him with a pneumothorax as well as a degloving injury on his ring finger. Langdon and Santos clash while treating him, with Santos dismissing Langdon's guidance over her grudge against him.
- Brenda Azurmendi (Cathryn Dylan Ortiz) is a woman who brings her son Micah into the ER after he suffers heat stroke from falling asleep inside his mother's unlocked car on July 4. Joy blames Brenda for leaving her son unattended and speculates whether Brenda intentionally put him in harm's way. Feeling guilty after learning that Micah may be cognitively impaired as a result of the heat stroke, Brenda attempts suicide by stepping into oncoming traffic, but Al-Hashimi stops her and has her put on an involuntary psychiatric hold. Robby is unsettled while watching Al-Hashimi question Brenda about whether she has previously experienced suicidal thoughts, as he himself is suicidal.
- Curtis Larson (Travis Van Winkle) is a patient brought in after drunkenly attacking his friends while golfing and subsequently having to be sedated by paramedics. Larson awakens in a disoriented state and puts Emma in a chokehold, but Dana subdues him with a shot of Versed she had in her pocket; he is also left with a bloody nose that Dana refuses to explain to Robby. Robby criticizes Dana's handling of Larson, warning that her use of force and unauthorized use of a controlled substance could jeopardize her nursing license; he also intuits that Dana had been carrying Versed as a defense mechanism after being assaulted.
- Judith Lastrade (Nicole Wolf) is a pregnant mother attempting a freebirth, who arrives at the ER after reporting headaches. Staff learn she has pre-eclampsia, and Robby and Abbot are eventually forced to perform an emergency C-section to save both Judith and her newborn daughter, who emerges from the womb appearing blue, but soon recovers. Abbot uses Judith's case as an example of the importance of the work Robby performs while talking him out of his suicidal urge and fatigue from the ER.
- Eddie Cohen (Dann Florek) is the husband of patient Frida Cohen, whom he accidentally hit with their car and who suffered a hairline fracture in her hip as a result. Mohan has Eddie inspected as well, learning he struggles to maintain balance, and learns that his disorientation was caused by a combination of his various medicines prescribed by different doctors. Mohan recommends moving the Cohens to a care home, but learns that their daughter Carrie has been unsuccessfully trying to convince her parents of the same. Mohan and Mel eventually devise a plan for the Cohens to receive at-home care, leaving Eddie grateful to them for listening.
