= 7:00 A.M. (The Pitt season 2) =

- The Pitt episode
- Episode no.: Season 2 Episode 1
- Directed by: John Wells
- Written by: R. Scott Gemmill
- Cinematography by: Johanna Coelho
- Editing by: Mark Strand
- Production code: T76.10201
- Original air date: January 8, 2026
- Running time: 53 minutes

Guest appearances
- Amielynn Abellera as Perlah; Brandon Mendez Homer as Donnie; Kristin Villanueva as Princess; Charles Baker as Troy; Lesley Boone as Lena; Derek Cecil as Michael Williams; Irene Choi as Joy; Irina Dubova as Yana Kovalenko; Jessica "Limer" Flores as Harlow Graham; Deepti Gupta as Dr. Eileen Shamsi; Ernest Harden Jr. as Louie Cloverfield; Ayesha Harris as Dr. Parker Ellis; Laëtitia Hollard as Emma Nolan; Lucas Iverson as James Ogilvie; Ken Kirby as Dr. John Shen; Alexandra Metz as Dr. Yolanda Garcia; Jenny O'Hara as Candace O'Grady; Jayne Taini as Evelyn Bostick; Annabelle Toomey as Kylie Conners; Tracy Vilar as Lupe Perez; Mara Klein as Debbie Cohen; Heather Wynters as Sister Grace Matthews; Porter Kelly as Margaret "Hail Mary" Walker

Episode chronology
← Previous "9:00 P.M."	Next → "8:00 A.M."

"7:00 A.M." is the first episode of the second season of the American medical drama television series The Pitt. It is the sixteenth overall episode of the series and was written by series creator R. Scott Gemmill, and directed by executive producer John Wells. It was released on HBO Max on January 8, 2026.

The series is set in Pittsburgh, following the staff of the Pittsburgh Trauma Medical Hospital ER (nicknamed "The Pitt") during a 15-hour emergency department shift. The series mainly follows Dr. Michael "Robby" Robinavitch, a senior attending still reeling from some traumas. In the episode, Robby arrives for a new shift on July 4, planning to take a 3-month sabbatical after it ends. The episode introduces new series regular Sepideh Moafi as Dr. Baran Al-Hashimi, a senior attending acting as Robby's temporary replacement.

The episode received positive reviews from critics, who considered it a promising start to the season, praising the performances, new characters and writing.

Ernest Harden Jr. won the Primetime Emmy Award for Outstanding Guest Actor in a Drama Series for his performance in this episode.

== Plot ==
On July 4th, Robby arrives on a motorcycle at the hospital for his shift. After the shift ends, he plans to go on a three-month sabbatical, with Dr. Baran Al-Hashimi acting as the interim senior attending physician. Al-Hashimi believes in the use of artificial intelligence in healthcare, and often subjects the staff to tests with new technology. Robby and Al-Hashimi supervise Whitaker and Mohan operating on a John Doe, with the help of new medical students Joy Kwon and James Ogilvie.

Langdon returns to the Pitt after attending rehab for benzodiazepine addiction, but Robby keeps his distance and assigns Langdon to work in triage. While tending patients, Langdon runs into Louie Cloverfield, an alcoholic and regular patient of his who is back in the hospital due to a toothache and regular pains. Langdon privately confesses to Louie that he stole some of Louie's prescribed Librium, which led to his suspension. (Note: As seen in "3:00 P.M.".) While taken aback, Louie brushes it off.

A 79-year-old man named Ethan Bostick is brought in after being found in an altered state, but as he has a POLST, Whitaker instructs the new staff to respect the man's wishes and let him die. Robby watches proudly as Whitaker has them take a moment of silence. Mel confides in Santos that she was named in a malpractice lawsuit, and she must give testimony in a deposition later that day. Santos tends to Kylie Conners, a girl who fell off the stairs. After noticing multiple bruises on Kylie's body, Santos asks the girl for an urine sample, which is revealed to be red-colored, indicating hematuria. Flagging abuse as a possibility, Santos decides to order a few more tests before deciding whether to report the case to authorities.

Dana returns to the hospital after a long break and is introduced to Emma Nolan, a recent nursing school graduate. Dana gives Emma a tour of the ER, when they are interrupted by Donnie, who found a baby abandoned in the restroom. The baby is put into a room for a regular check, while Emma helps Dana in showering Troy Digby, a homeless man who arrives with a foul smell. Bostick's wife, Evelyn, who has Alzheimer's disease, arrives in an ambulance asking about her husband. McKay tends to a man with a wrist injury, Michael Williams, who is frustrated with the check-ups and wants to leave as early as possible. Williams is unable to recall whether he suffered a head injury, and when he later behaves erratically and answers several of McKay's basic questions incorrectly, McKay suspects his condition to be more serious. At the baby's room, Al-Hashimi freezes after receiving new information, seemingly in shock.

== Production ==
=== Development ===
The episode was written by series creator R. Scott Gemmill, and directed by executive producer John Wells. It marked Gemmill's seventh writing credit, and Wells' third directing credit.

=== Writing ===
In the opening scene, Robby is seen arriving at the Pittsburgh Trauma Medical Center to start his shift, riding a motorcycle without a helmet. Noah Wyle said that this was done as "it was important to say Robby can't pretend he doesn't have a problem anymore. We wanted to show what that looks like when you know you need help, but you don't really want it." Many in the staff worried about including the scene, as Robby is usually portrayed as a flawed but heroic person, and the scene would depict him as reckless. When filming began, the crew still did not decide on whether or not the scene should have Robby wear a helmet, so they filmed two versions of the scene, which would be decided later on. Eventually, they decided to use the take with no helmet.

Wells said that Langdon's return was based on two aspects: Langdon expecting some recognition for his progress, and the staff's polarized response on his return. He said, "I think showing the realities of how difficult recovery is, and at the same time, how you shouldn't have expectations that everyone's going to accept you having done that recovery, is very important." Wyle further added, "Langdon was his star student, and that was more of a moral failing for Robby than it was for Langdon." On having Langdon apologize to Louie, actor Patrick Ball said, "It is really tricky when coming to terms with the ways in which you have wronged people", but by having Louie accept the apology, it would show that "probably, there's a lot of people that don't hate him near as much as he anticipates."

The character of Dr. Baran Al-Hashimi was created to offer commentary on the use of artificial intelligence in healthcare (AI) and "to put a little more pressure on" Robby. Gemmill explained, "We thought it might be fun to introduce [AI] through a character who's very tech-forward and thinks that this is a great thing for the emergency department and sort of create a little bit of conflict between her and someone like Robby, who's much more old school and is, like some of us, a little reticent about what's going to happen with AI, whereas she's someone who's embracing it. So it just creates a little more conflict between the two of them." He added, "Like [any other] new technology, it has great benefits potentially, but it also has setbacks. And like anything new, there are people who embrace change, and there are those who are going to resist with kicking and screaming."

On having Whitaker as an instructor to new students, Gerran Howell explained, "It was a lovely surprise seeing that because obviously, I thought that there's no way Whitaker could be this incompetent after ten months. Are they going to keep him? Is he going to be changing scrubs every episode still? Like, sure, he'd be fired by that point. We don't get scripts very close in advance [of filming], so I was left in limbo for ages thinking, 'God, what am I?' Whitaker has to have changed in this period, but I'm really grateful that he seems to have flourished a little bit and has found his stride. I was very grateful to the writers for doing that for me. It was nice."

=== Music ===
For the opening scene, the song "Better Off Without You" by the Clarks was used. Gemmill said the choice was picked as the Clarks are Pittsburgh-based, "so we wanted to give a little love back to Pittsburgh", and because it also shows Robby's new state of mind; "Robby's journey this year is one of trying to find his place — and whether his place is still here in the emergency department. He's going through a bit of an existential crisis", Gemmill explained.

== Critical reception ==
"7:00 A.M." received mostly positive reviews from critics. Jesse Schedeen of IGN gave the episode a "good" 7 out of 10 rating and wrote in his verdict, "If you enjoyed The Pitt in Season 1, there's absolutely no reason you won't be on board with Season 2. The new season follows that same, proven formula, with only the addition of Sepideh Moafi's Dr. Baran Al-Hashimi serving to shake up the mix. Perhaps Baran is portrayed in an overly antagonistic light early on, but the hope is that this will change as the season unfolds and the stakes at the hospital grow more urgent. All that really matters is that Episode 1 establishes a strong foundation on which the new season can easily build from hour to hour."

Caroline Siede of The A.V. Club gave the episode a "B+" grade and wrote, "It's certainly a hook to take us into next week but more in a 'I'm not sure what's happening' way than an 'I can't wait to see where this goes' way. Still, despite that concern, it's so fun to be back in the world of The Pitt that I'm mostly inclined to let it slide for now. The premise of the show may be a little less novel in its second season. But that also means it's even more comforting too. I'm so emotionally invested in these hyper-competent characters that simply clocking in with them for another shift is a joy. And as one of the first big shows to return in 2026, 'elevated comfort food' isn't a bad way to kick off the new year — or the Fourth of July."

Maggie Fremont of Vulture gave the episode a 4-star rating out of 5 and wrote, "even in the not-so-glamorous aspects of the nursing gig, Emma already gets a meaningful lesson from Dana — that even simple things like 'a little soap, water, and human decency' can make a huge difference in a patient's life. I mean, don't worry, Dana hasn't gotten all schmaltzy on us — she does this while snapping her gum and in a possibly even thicker accent than last season while also whipping all her nurses, medical assistants, and most importantly, the doctors into shape. I missed this woman so much and am glad to see her back in action after everything and yet I remain worried about what another seemingly long-ass shift might do to her. Happy Fourth of July, I guess?"

Brady Langmann of Esquire wrote, "This show is really fucking good. I've watched the season 2 premiere three times now, and the only thought I keep coming back to is that The Pitt is still exceptional TV." Alec Bojalad of Den of Geek wrote, "Even without a mass casualty event like last season's PittFest massacre (or whatever disaster is surely to come later this year), '7:00 A.M.' is relentlessly kinetic all the way through. And through it all, the only character who receives a short shrift is aforementioned new attending Dr. Al-Hashimi."

Johnny Loftus of Decider wrote, "Here in the Season 2 premiere, we got protective of Dr. Cassie McKay and her support staff when her patient Mr. Williams, perhaps suffering from an undiagnosed brain injury, impulsively started to kick her. Hey! Leave our friends alone! Yes, it's kinda irrational. But this is just fantastic television. We feel like we know these people, something we've never once thought about Meredith Grey." Adam Patla of Telltale TV gave the episode a 4.5-star rating out of 5 and wrote, "Langdon's apology to Louie encapsulates the very thing that keeps The Pitt at the forefront of the television conversation. It's incredibly honest and uncomfortable, but equally moving and earnest. It does not sensationalize what occurred, but its honesty allows it to have emotional impact."

Sean T. Collins of The New York Times wrote, "Rock-star Robby may be the main attraction, but The Pitt is a full-throated celebration of expertise, competence, cooperation, science and diversity, at a time when those values are under widespread attack. In The Pitt, at least, those values are still alive and kicking." Jasmine Blu of TV Fanatic gave the episode a 4-star rating out of 5 and wrote, "For the most part, the season premiere was a bit of a slower hour than one could anticipate, but we're just getting started. With the welcome (or awkward) returns of Dana and Langdon, some new faces, and updates worth processing, there was a lot brewing in this hour."
