= Samira Mohan =

Fictional character from The Pitt

- The Pitt character
- First appearance: "7:00 A.M. (2025)"
- Created by: R. Scott Gemmill
- Portrayed by: Supriya Ganesh

In-universe information
- Full name: Samira Mohan
- Nickname: Slow-Mo
- Occupation: Third-year resident physician (season 1); Fourth-year resident physician (season 2)
- Home: Pittsburgh, Pennsylvania, United States; New Jersey, United States

Samira Mohan is a fictional character from the HBO Max medical procedural drama The Pitt, portrayed by Supriya Ganesh. She is a resident physician in the emergency department of the Pittsburgh Trauma Medical Center. Mohan is renowned for her high patient satisfaction scores, but she struggles with the fast pace of emergency medicine, and grows to question her suitability in the speciality.

== Character biography ==
=== Season 1 ===
The character of Samira Mohan is introduced as a third-year resident. Although her approachable and compassionate attitude earns her patients' appreciation, it frustrates her colleagues, particularly the attending physician Dr. Robby. Her patient-centered care approach is portrayed as being excessively slow, for which she has been nicknamed Slow-Mo.

When Joyce St. Clair is brought into the emergency department and wrongly labelled as an addict seeking drugs, Mohan is the only character to identify that Joyce is experiencing a sickle cell crisis. Mohan bonds with Joyce and her wife Ondine, and reveals to them that she is researching the racial disparities in healthcare. This interest was motivated by the death of her father, caused by a heart attack dismissed by medical professionals, which occurred when she was thirteen years old. Although Joyce and Ondine are grateful for Mohan's attentive care, Robby reprimands Mohan for spending too much time with them.

Mohan is unafraid to scold other characters when they show a lack of compassion towards patients. For example, she lectures student doctor Dennis Whitaker when he makes light of Joyce's pain and she criticises Dr. Trinity Santos' bedside manner. However, she is also written as a caring character. After Whitaker's confidence is shaken, she supports him in picking new cases and reaffirms his abilities as a medical student. Later in the day, she also comforts Santos after Santos is shouted at by Dr. Frank Langdon.

Mohan works with student doctor Victoria Javadi to treat Nandi, a character who is a social media influencer. Although Robby insists that Nandi is experiencing new-onset schizophrenia, Nandi is certain that her sickness is not psychological. Mohan receives encouragement from Dr. Heather Collins to listen to her instincts, and, with Javadi, Mohan discovers that Nandi has mercury poisoning caused by a face cream.

Working with Whitaker, Mohan suspects that a patient named Ivan Pugliesi is lying about experiencing vomiting and diarrhea in order to receive morphine. She gives him BUPE, a medication used to treat opioid use disorder. The BUPE relieves Ivan's pain, though he is angered when he realises that this exposes him as an addict. Mohan responds calmly to Ivan's threats to sue the hospital.

When the victims of the Pittfest mass shooting arrive at the emergency department, Mohan works with Robby and the night shift attending physician Dr. Jack Abbot to treat the most gravely-injured patients. Under Abbot's supervision, she performs a risky pigtail catheter procedure.

Even after the arrival of Pittfest victims slows, Mohan is still experiencing an adrenaline high. When she insists that she wants to continue working even though their shift is over, Dr. Cassie McKay suggests that she lacks a proper work-life balance. When exhaustion finally hits her, she is shown crying in the bathroom.

At the end of the day, Mohan joins Robby, Abbot, Javadi and nurses Princess Dela Cruz, Mateo Diaz and Donnie Donahue in a nearby park to drink beer.

=== Season 2 ===
The Pitt's second season resumes on the 4th of July. Mohan is now in the fourth and final year of her residency.

Mohan struggles with her relationship with her mother throughout the season. She reveals to McKay that her mother aims to sell their home in New Jersey and go on a worldwide cruise with her new husband. This would disrupt Mohan's plan to move back in with her mother and pursue a partnership track position in New Jersey. Throughout the day, Mohan ignores her mother's persistent phone calls. Her stress culminates into what she believes to be a heart attack, though tests reveal that it was only a panic attack. Robby lambasts her for letting her "mommy issues" interfere with her work.

Mohan is shown speaking to her mother in Tamil, suggesting that she is of Tamil descent.

Mohan is also shown struggling to decide on a direction for her career, and tells new attending physician Dr. Baran Al-Hashimi that she is considering multiple different fellowship options. She also reveals that her research into racial disparities in healthcare has been discontinued due to funding cuts. Al-Hashimi recommends that she could consider a fellowship in geriatric medicine, which Robby later reiterates.

Mohan treats Orlando Diaz, who is experiencing diabetic ketoacidosis because—due to recently losing his health insurance—he has only been taking half of his prescribed insulin dosage. When his wife Lorrie confides in Mohan that they will struggle to afford his hospital treatment, Mohan introduces the family to Noelle Hastings, the hospital's bed manager, who discusses payment options with them. Even with plans to alleviate the cost of his treatment, Orlando remains stressed about finances and missing work.

Mohan collects insulin and electrolyte powder to give to Orlando, but she arrives at his room and finds it empty. Orlando has secretly left the hospital without completing his treatment in order to go to his next shift at work. Instead Abbot is using the room to self-treat an injury inflicted while working in as a SWAT team's medic. Abbot offers to pay for an Uber to transport the supplies to Orlando's house, and Mohan cleans Abbot's wound.

Mohan is distressed when paramedics return Orlando to the emergency department, having fallen off a ladder at work. Mohan is portrayed as emotional and distracted while Orlando is treated.

== Development ==
In July 2024, it was announced that Ganesh had been cast in the role of Mohan as a series regular. To prepare for the role, Ganesh attended a two-week-long bootcamp to learn about emergency medicine with her castmates. Ganesh, however, already had a familiarity with the medical terms used because she was previously a pre-med student.

== Reception ==
Harper's Bazaar has described Mohan as a "fan favorite" character. In interviews, Ganesh has told of medical professionals who have reached out to her with praise for the relatable nature of Mohan's character.

In April 2026, while the second season was still airing, it was announced that Ganesh would be leaving the show. This was controversial, and many fans directed their anger towards producer Noah Wyle. The exit of the character of Mohan fuelled arguments about poor treatment of the female characters of color in The Pitt. Referring to Tracy Ifeachor's departure as Collins after season 1, Olivia Truffaut-Wong wrote, "The Pitt writing out a woman of color for the second time makes it feel less like a story-driven decision and more like the show's way of meeting a strict woman of color quota that it can't—or won't—exceed." This has been viewed as indicative of the wider issue of racism within the entertainment industry. Others felt that her departure was a logical conclusion to Mohan's story.
