= Irene Choi =

American actress (born 1992)

- Born: November 1992 (age 33); Los Angeles, United States
- Education: Harvard University
- Occupation: Actress
- Years active: 2009–present

Irene Choi (born November 1992) is an American actress, who has appeared in films such as Arena (2011), Freaks of Nature (2015), Fifty Shades of Black (2016), and Marriage Story (2019). She is best known for her work on the television shows Community, Insatiable, and The Pitt.

== Early life and education ==
Choi was born in Los Angeles, and she is of Korean ancestry. Her parents were immigrants.

Choi is a graduate of Harvard University, where she majored in psychology. She has played the violin since childhood and was a member of the Harvard Orchestra. She was also a member of an all-girl rock band and worked as a campus radio DJ. After graduating, she worked as a business analyst at a large retail company in Los Angeles before pursuing acting, which she has described as a lifelong passion that she initially considered a fantasy rather than a viable career.

== Career ==
After leaving her corporate position, Choi began pursuing acting. Her early television credits included a recurring role in the ABC Family series Greek (2010) and a guest appearance in Undercovers (2010). She has cited her first manager, who was connected to the casting director of Greek, as instrumental in her early career development.

Choi appeared in three episodes of Community as Annie Kim, a rival of the main character Annie Edison (Alison Brie). In a 2011 Reddit AMA, Choi described her experience on set warmly, recalling improvised moments with Brie during filming.

Choi played Dixie Sinclair, the primary antagonist of the Netflix dramedy Insatiable, across all 16 episodes of the show's two-season run. Dixie is a pageant queen and high school rival of the main character. Choi described being drawn to the role by its subversion of the conventional "mean girl" trope, noting that Dixie is distinctly unpopular despite her villainous role, and that her character's identity as an Asian adoptee raised in the American South added an unusual dimension. She worked with a dialect coach to develop Dixie's Southern accent for the role. In a 2018 interview, Choi discussed the appeal of playing a villain: "I, personally, love playing the villain — especially if the villain ends up being a really, really funny villain."

In 2025, Choi was announced as a recurring cast member for the second season of the Max medical drama The Pitt, alongside Sepideh Moafi, Laëtitia Hollard, Charles Baker, and Lucas Iverson. She plays Joy Kwon, a third-year medical student with expertise in pathology and infectious diseases.

== Filmography ==
=== Film ===
Year	Title	Role	Notes	Ref(s)
2009	The Curse of the Sapphire Pendant	Jessica	Short film	
2009	Parkside Symphony	Isabelle	Short film	
2011	Arena	Kaneko	Direct-to-video	
2013	The Perils of Growing Up Flat-Chested	Katya	Short film	
2014	I Ship It	Sofia	Short film	
2015	Bleeding Heart	Girlfriend		
2015	The Perfect Guy	Office Receptionist		
2015	Angie + Zahra	Angie	Short film	
2015	Freaks of Nature	Goth Girl #1		
2015	Sherman the Goat		Short film	
2016	Fifty Shades of Black	Mai		
2017	Fixed	Front Desk Girl		
2017	The Outdoorsman	Annie		
2018	Little Bitches	Tiffany	Uncredited	
2019	Marriage Story	Theater Actor		
2025	Valley Fever	Luna Vanwick	Short film	

=== Television ===
Year	Title	Role	Notes	Ref(s)
2010	Greek	Angie	3 episodes	
2011–2015	Community	Annie Kim	3 episodes	
2016	Grey's Anatomy	Ashley Hughes	1 episode	
2016	Shameless	Taryn	1 episode	
2017	Silicon Valley		1 episode	
2018–2019	Insatiable	Dixie Sinclair	16 episodes	
2019	I Think You Should Leave with Tim Robinson		1 episode	
2020	Good Girls	Amy	1 episode	
2021	Truth Be Told	Blaine	4 episodes	
2021	Rebel	Kate Foster	1 episode	
2022	Pam & Tommy	Alicia Krentz	1 episode	
2026	The Pitt	Joy Kwon	Recurring	
