= 7:00 A.M. (The Pitt season 1) =

- The Pitt episode
- Episode no.: Season 1 Episode 1
- Directed by: John Wells
- Written by: R. Scott Gemmill
- Cinematography by: Johanna Coelho
- Editing by: Mark Strand
- Production code: T76.10101
- Original air date: January 9, 2025
- Running time: 53 minutes

Guest appearances
- Shawn Hatosy as Dr. Jack Abbott (special guest star); Amielynn Abellera as Perlah; Jalen Thomas Brooks as Mateo Diaz; Brandon Mendez Homer as Donnie; Kristin Villanueva as Princess; Kim Bonifay as Amanda Jones; Alfonso Caballero as Otis Williams; Joanna Going as Theresa Saunders; Deepti Gupta as Dr. Eileen Shamsi; Michael Hyatt as Gloria Underwood; Jackson Kelly as David Saunders; Krystel V. McNeil as Kiara Alfaro; Alexandra Metz as Dr. Yolanda Garcia; Riley Neldam as Drew Jones; Drew Powell as Doug Driscoll; David Reivers as Milton; Bess Rous as Sherry Davis; Arun Storrs as Minu

Episode chronology
← Previous —	Next → "8:00 A.M."

"7:00 A.M." is the series premiere of the American medical drama television series The Pitt. The episode was written by series creator R. Scott Gemmill, and directed by executive producer John Wells. It was released on Max on January 9, 2025.

The series is set in Pittsburgh, following the staff of the Pittsburgh Trauma Medical Hospital emergency department (nicknamed "The Pitt") during a 15-hour shift. The series mainly follows Dr. Michael "Robby" Robinavitch, a senior attending still reeling from some traumas.

The series premiere received positive reviews from critics, who praised its performances, technical aspects and directing. Wells and Gemmill received Primetime Emmy Award nominations for Outstanding Directing for a Drama Series and Outstanding Writing for a Drama Series respectively.

== Plot ==
In Pittsburgh, attending Dr. Michael "Robby" Robinavitch starts a shift at the Pittsburgh Trauma Medical Hospital ER (nicknamed "The Pitt"). The day marks the fourth anniversary of the death of his mentor Dr. Adamson. The head nurse Dana Evans asks if he is ok to work. Nurses ask him if rumors are true that the hospital will be sold and ER eliminated. He talks overnight attending Dr. Jack Abbot off the edge of the roof, joking about the horrors of the job.

Robby welcomes new trainees to the department: Dr. Melissa "Mel" King, a second-year resident, intern (first-year resident) Trinity Santos, and medical students Victoria Javadi and Dennis Whitaker. Robby introduces them to charge nurse Dana Evans, and senior residents Heather Collins and Frank Langdon. The trainees observe as Dr. Cassie McKay and nurse Mateo Diaz begin to treat a woman with a burned hand and two children, who McKay suspects is unhoused.

Dana encounters Collins, who has morning sickness and has had a previous miscarriage. Collins and Langdon treat a woman, Minu, with a broken and degloved foot and the man who saved her from falling onto the subway tracks. Surgeon Dr. Yolanda Garcia joins the response, but leaves when it turns out not to be surgical. Javadi faints. Robby is surprised to learn that Javadi is the daughter of surgeon Eileen Shamsi. While on rounds, the team meets Louie Cloverfield, a recurring patient with alcoholism who is prescribed Lorazepam by Robby and Librium by Langdon. Mel and Langdon receive a lethargic four-year-old boy. The father realizes that the boy ate some of his weed gummies.

Hospital administrator Gloria Underwood informs Robby that the Pitt's Press Ganey patient satisfaction score is low. He argues that if the hospital was properly staffed it would improve. Gloria threatens to fire him. New elderly patients begin to arrive by ambulance, as they do every day at 7:30am when the nursing homes do morning bed checks. After one woman is declared dead, Robby gets his staff to take a moment of silence as a way to honor their fallen patients. Other notable patients are introduced: Joseph Spencer, Doug Driscoll, and Mr. Milton.

A vomiting middle-aged woman named Theresa Saunders, arrives with her son David. She reveals to Robby that she made herself sick because she wanted professional help for her son, who wrote a hit list of female classmates to "be eliminated". Robby consults with the hospital's social worker Kiara Alfaro, and they question David about his behavior. Realizing they know about the list, David flees the hospital and Robby fails to catch him. When Robby returns to the hospital, he is overwhelmed by the amount of patients in the waiting room. This triggers a PTSD flashback for Robby to when he worked in the Pitt during the COVID-19 pandemic.

== Production ==
=== Development ===
The episode was written by series creator R. Scott Gemmill, and directed by executive producer John Wells.

=== Writing ===
Noah Wyle explained the significance of Dr. Adamson's death for Robby, "In some ways, he serves as a metaphor for that thing that we lost that we can't quite get back — that part of ourselves that we lost during the pandemic that has changed us in a way that we haven't really been able to synthesize, or process, or come to any kind of understanding about yet — mostly because, like Robby, we've been continually pressed into service, to move forward and move on, and normalize more and more outrageous circumstances, as if this is a normal mode of life. It builds up in aggregate."

== Critical reception ==
"7:00 A.M." received positive reviews from critics. Laura Bogart of The A.V. Club gave the episode a "B+" grade and wrote, "The Pitt sometimes struggles under the heft of its obligation to all of them, especially in this first episode. The show is best when it's in motion and when it uses patient encounters to provoke more meaningful character moments and growth."

Alan Sepinwall wrote, "During the traumas, the camera doesn't whirl around like it does on ER, and the sense of chaos is conveyed a bit differently. And the pacing is its own thing; when Robby asks everyone to take a minute to reflect on the death of the DNR woman from the nursing home, it also feels like The Pitt saying it doesn't feel compelled to race through everything, just because the previous hospital show these people made did." Maggie Fremont of Vulture gave the episode a 4 star rating out of 5 and wrote, "Sure, this pilot episode could use, like, 10 percent more exposition, but on the whole, simply dropping us into the chaos and asking us to keep up because lives are on the line works to The Pitt's advantage. The unrelenting pace as we weave in and out of patient rooms mimics what The Pitt is trying to show us our characters go through during a shift in an overcrowded, underfunded city trauma center."

Johnny Loftus of Decider wrote, "What he doesn't mean is some John Carter-esque dream of a healthful outcome for all, or the spark of something in the human condition that will make all of them believe. No, Robby just means ulcers. Or nightmares. Or the suicidal tendencies given by the rhythms of the work that he does and Dr. Abbott does, and all of the staff at The Pitt does – as overworked medical professionals in an underfunded hospital with the modern US healthcare system as its albatross." Gabriela Burgos Soler of Telltale TV wrote, "The medical profession is filled with immense pressure and no time to breathe. The Pitt perfectly encapsulates that from the moment the audience sees the emergency room. It's a packed waiting room, with doctors and nurses running from one end of the room to another, and a patient board that never clears."

== Accolades ==
Award	Year	Category	Recipient(s)	Result	Ref.
Art Directors Guild Awards	2026	One-Hour Contemporary Single-Camera Series	Nina Ruscio	Nominated	
Directors Guild of America Awards	2026	Outstanding Directorial Achievement in Dramatic Series	John Wells	Nominated	
Primetime Emmy Awards	2025	Outstanding Directing for a Drama Series	John Wells	Nominated	
Primetime Emmy Awards	2025	Outstanding Writing for a Drama Series	R. Scott Gemmill	Nominated	
Writers Guild of America Awards	2026	Episodic Drama	R. Scott Gemmill	Won	
