= Michael Robinavitch =

Fictional character from The Pitt

- The Pitt character
- Noah Wyle as Robby in The Pitt season one
- First appearance: "7:00 A.M." (2025)
- Created by: R. Scott Gemmill
- Portrayed by: Noah Wyle

In-universe information
- Full name: Michael Robinavitch
- Nickname: Robby
- Occupation: Senior attending
- Home: Pittsburgh, Pennsylvania, United States
- Nationality: American

Michael "Robby" Robinavitch is a fictional character and protagonist of the HBO Max medical procedural drama series The Pitt, portrayed by American actor and series executive producer Noah Wyle. The character was introduced in "7:00 A.M.", the show's pilot episode, as the Senior Emergency Attending Physician of the emergency room of the Pittsburgh Trauma Medical Center. He is depicted as a talented if slightly reckless and irascible physician with a sharp wit and intense dedication to his patients and his team, which earns him the respect of the doctors and nurses, but often the ire of the hospital's administrators. During the first season, Robby contends with the trauma of losing his mentor, Dr. Adamson, during the COVID-19 pandemic while working a shift on the anniversary of his death.

The character and Wyle's performance have received acclaim from critics, with Wyle receiving several awards and nominations including two Primetime Emmy Awards for Outstanding Lead Actor in a Drama Series.

== Fictional character biography ==
=== Early life and career ===
Robby was born in 1973 and grew up in Pittsburgh. When he was 8 years old, his mother abandoned him to the care of his observant Jewish grandparents; he attended services at Rodef Shalom and recited the Shema with his grandmother each morning.

As an adult, Robby chose to pursue medicine as a career. Following his graduation from medical school, he did his residency at Big Charity Hospital in New Orleans. One of Robby's first patients on his first day there was a 5-year-old boy who had been accidentally shot by his brother while they were playing with their father's gun; the boy was worried about getting his brother in trouble, right up to the point where he coded and died. The incident left Robby deeply shaken, and he ultimately took to walking the hospital cemetery at night to vent and put his feelings.

Returning to Pittsburgh, Robby switched to emergency medicine at Pittsburgh Trauma Medical Center, under the tutelage of Dr. Montgomery Adamson. After Robby's fellowship ended, he stayed to work under Adamson, a professional and personal relationship that they maintained until Adamson died during the COVID-19 pandemic. Adamson contracted the disease and spent 17 days on a ventilator before Robby had to take him off to save other patients. Robby would succeed Adamson as head of the PTMC emergency department, but the loss of his mentor has still weighed heavily on him.

=== Season 1 ===
Arriving for his shift at Pittsburgh Trauma Medical Center, affectionately nicknamed "The Pitt", Robby deflects concerns from charge nurse Dana Evans about working on the fourth anniversary of Dr. Adamson's death, something he has previously avoided doing. He also brushes off rumors that the department is going to be sold, gathering the staff, including new residents Trinity Santos and Mel King, and students Dennis Whitaker and Victoria Javadi, and instructing them to prioritise treating patients efficiently.

As he begins seeing patients, hospital administrator Gloria Underwood chastises him for the department's low patient satisfaction scores, while Robby tells her that systemic issues like staffing and overcrowding are to blame. Throughout the day, Robby is shown as a dedicated teacher, supporting Whitaker when he loses his first patient, encouraging Dr. Cassie McKay's concerns of elder abuse in one of her cases, and working alongside Dr. Frank Langdon and Dr. Heather Collins.

He has a contentious relationship with resident Samira Mohan, with whom he becomes frustrated due to her cautious and slow pace when treating patients, instructing her to act more decisively and balance her empathy with efficient treatment. He is challenged by McKay over the treatment of a troubled teenager, David Saunders, who was brought to The Pitt by his mother Theresa, who faked an illness to get him psychiatric help after finding a list of girls in his journal along with the phase "all should be eliminated." McKay fears that David may pose a violent threat to these girls, and she pushes Robby to contact the police. Robby is resistant to this idea due to concerns about the impact such an allegation could have on David if it proved to be false. McKay defies Robby and calls the police anyway, leading David to flee.

Robby also clashes with Langdon after Santos proves he has been stealing librium from the department, and sends him home without informing of their colleagues about the true reason why. Early in the shift, he is visited by Jake, the son of his former girlfriend Janey, whom he sees as a surrogate son, and is later distraught when Dana informs him there has been a mass shooting at the local music festival Jake was attending.

As patients begin streaming in, Robby and night shift attending Dr. Jack Abbot lead on the critical cases, and he reluctantly permits Langdon to join them. Robby is unable to save Jake's girlfriend, Leah, who was shot in the chest, and Jake refuses to forgive him. This, alongside the memories of Adamson's death, overwhelm Robby, and he has a panic attack and emotional breakdown in the makeshift mortuary. He is found by Whitaker, who is able to reassure him and convince him to return to the ER by imparting some advice that Robby had told him earlier that morning.

At the end of the shift, Robby delivers a speech condemning the mass shooting and praising his colleagues for their work through the day. Dana consoles Robby when he stares at a memorial, explaining that Adamson's death could not be prevented in any way. On the roof of the hospital, Robby and Abbott have a conversation, in which Robby confesses to his panic attack, and Abbott reassures him that he did a great job. They then leave for the day, planning to go for a drink with a few colleagues at the park.

=== Season 2 ===
Ten months later, on the Fourth of July, Robby arrives at The Pitt on a motorcycle, riding helmetless. After the shift ends, he plans to go on a three-month sabbatical, with Dr. Baran Al-Hashimi acting as the interim senior attending physician, though the two immediately clash over her advocacy for artificial intelligence in healthcare and her ideas for reforms to the ED that Robby feels undermines him. Robby avoids and dismisses Langdon, who returns for his first shift after a period in rehab, and continues mentoring the other staff, particularly Whitaker, who has usurped Langdon as his protegé. He also reassures Mel about her impending malpractice deposition, saying that he has been sued multiple times. Robby is also casually dating nurse and case manager Noelle Hastings.

Robby is especially impacted by one of his patients, a Jewish woman named Yana Kovalenko, who survived the Pittsburgh synagogue shooting and challenges his lack of commitment to his faith. He is also challenged by psychiatrist Caleb Jefferson, but ignores his advice to consider seeking therapy for his PTSD and insists that his sabbatical is what he needs. As the shift progresses, several others in the ED—including Dana, Abbot, McKay, and patient Duke Ekins (a motorcycle engineer and friend of Robby's)—notice Robby's erratic behavior and worry he may be suicidal, and Robby responds evasively to their concerns. He is also critical of Mohan when she experiences a panic attack, and admonishes her for being weak and unable to cope with the pressure of the department, and gives Whitaker the keys to his apartment while giving vague answers around if and when he will return. After speaking with Santos, Robby challenges Whitaker's relationship with a former patient and espouses the importance of maintaining boundaries. Robby feels increasingly tormented by whether the ED can survive in his absence, but Dana criticizes him for having a martyr complex, and urges him to forgive Langdon, though he rebukes her comments and accuses her of being on edge ever since she was assaulted by a patient on the day of the shooting. Robby later encourages Langdon to perform a risky procedure to save a patient, which ultimately succeeds. He also admits to Duke that he is suicidal and the hospital distracts him from his thoughts.

== Development ==
=== Casting ===
Wyle co-created The Pitt alongside R. Scott Gemmill and John Wells, with the idea originating from Wyle's suggestion that they develop a show based on the experiences of John Carter, the character he played in ER, as a frontline worker during the COVID-19 pandemic. When negotiations with the estate of ER creator Michael Crichton broke down, the trio conceived of a new idea for the show, with Wyle starring as Michael Robinavitch. Robby's surname is the maiden name of Wyle's great-grandmother.

=== Characterization ===
Gerran Howell, who portrays Dennis Whitaker, considers the scene where Whitaker finds Robby having a panic attack during the first season to be very valuable scene for the two characters and helped to establish a closer working relationship between them. Wyle added that Whitaker was Robby's "new favorite" by the start of the second season following his fallout with Dr. Langdon in season one, with Howell expressing that he felt the two men had a "weird trauma bond" because they had seen each other "at their lowest" and that Robby subtly shows this through various ways throughout the series.

Discussing the exploration of Robby's relationship with his Jewish faith in the second season Wyle explained, "Well, Robby's faith, or lack thereof, or grappling with his faith last season and including him and his lowest moment reciting the Shema — almost like this childlike prayer, this sort of very primal plea for help — was a really important part of the character's evolution."

== Reception ==
The character of Robby, and Wyle's performance, have received critical acclaim. Richard Lawson of Vanity Fair called it a "commanding performance", writing that, "Wyle is an endlessly compelling lead ... His bedside tone, personable and clinically distant at once, is a precise depiction of the guarded compassion of a real doctor. Wyle deftly manages the shifts in emotional temperature as each hour unfolds, selling us on the relentless roller coaster of it all." Laura Bogart of The A.V. Club described it as "a lead performance that feels truly lived-in", writing that "Wyle is remarkable at giving empathy a dramatic alacrity, making the act of listening rich with purpose and potential." Kristen Baldwin of Entertainment Weekly described him as "a master at compassionate calm" and said the emotional unravelling of his character was "executed with breath-taking skill."

=== Awards and nominations ===
For his portrayal as Robby, Wyle won the Primetime Emmy Award for Outstanding Lead Actor in a Drama Series at the 77th Primetime Emmy Awards and 78th Primetime Emmy Awards, the Golden Globe Award for Best Actor – Television Series Drama at the 83rd Golden Globes, and the Critics' Choice Television Award for Best Actor in a Drama Series at the 31st Critics' Choice Awards. He also won the Best Actor – Television award at the AARP Movies for Grownups Awards, Best Actor in a Drama Series at the Astra Awards, Best TV Performance - Drama award at the Dorian TV Awards, and the TCA Award for Individual Achievement in Drama. Wyle also won both the Screen Actors Guild Award for Outstanding Performance by a Male Actor in a Drama Series and the Screen Actors Guild Award for Outstanding Performance by an Ensemble in a Drama Series alongside the rest of the cast at the 32nd Actor Awards.
