= Ili-Ili, Tulog Anay =

Traditional Hiligaynon lullaby

"Ili-Ili, Tulog Anay" (lit. 'Little One, Sleep for a While') is a traditional Hiligaynon lullaby that originated in Iloilo, located in the Visayas, Philippines. The song is typically sung by a caregiver to a child, and it references a mother who is away buying bread. Although the original composer of the lullaby is unknown, a transcription of its music and lyrics was published in Folk Songs: Songs of the Visayas by Priscilla Magdamo in 1957. The lullaby gained renewed popularity after being featured in the Filipino supernatural horror film White Lady (2006).

== Remakes ==
A modernized remake by the Pinoy pop boy group Alamat in collaboration with Lyca Gairanod, titled "ILY ILY", was released in 2022 and references parents working as overseas Filipino workers.

== In popular culture ==
The Filipino supernatural horror film White Lady, released by Regal Films in 2006, featured the lullaby in a haunting and eerie context. The film starred Pauleen Luna and Angelica Panganiban.

In season 2, episode 7 of the television series The Pitt, Dr. Trinity Santos (played by Isa Briones) sings the song to calm down a baby.
