= Supriya Ganesh =

American actress (born 1997)

- Born: December 16, 1997 (age 28); Texas, United States
- Education: Columbia University (BA)
- Occupation: Actor
- Years active: 2018–present

Supriya Ganesh (born December 16, 1997) is an American actor. She (Note: Ganesh uses both she/her and they/them pronouns. This article uses she/her for consistency.) is known for her role as Dr. Samira Mohan on the HBO Max medical drama television series The Pitt (2025–2026), which won the Primetime Emmy Award for Outstanding Drama Series in 2025.

== Early life ==
Ganesh was born in Texas to Tamil parents from India. At the age of three she moved with her family to New Delhi. She graduated as the valedictorian of her class from Pathways School Noida in 2015. She later moved back to the United States to attend Columbia University, from which she graduated with a degree in neuroscience and a minor in gender studies, with the intent of attending medical school. While at Columbia, she began auditioning for acting roles, pursuing both paths simultaneously. Her parents were supportive but cautious and encouraged her to have a backup plan; as a result, the majority of her undergraduate education followed a pre-med pathway, with Ganesh taking all required coursework up to organic chemistry before ultimately prioritizing acting.

== Career ==
=== Television and film ===
Ganesh began auditioning for acting roles while a student at Columbia University. She made her screen debut on the CBS series Blue Bloods in 2018. Over the following years she accumulated a series of roles in episodic television shows such as The Enemy Within, The Village (both 2019), New Amsterdam (2021), Law & Order: Special Victims Unit, Everything's Trash (both 2022), Chicago Med, Billions (both 2023), and a recurring role as Nova in Grown-ish (2023–2024). She received her Screen Actors Guild (SAG) card in 2022.

Throughout this period, she continued working as an MCAT tutor, retaining medical school option as a fallback option. She was cast as Dr. Samira Mohan, a third-year medical resident, in The Pitt, a Max medical drama created by R. Scott Gemmill and executive produced by John Wells. Set over a single 15-hour shift at a Pittsburgh emergency room led by Dr. Michael Robinavitch (Noah Wyle), the series premiered on 9 January 2025. Ganesh appeared in all 15 episodes of the first season. She described Dr. Mohan as "almost like a version of myself had I done that." She also drew on personal experience to develop the character's cultural identity by choosing to have Samira speak in Tamil to her mother on screen, a detail she proposed to the show's creators.

In April 2026, it was announced that Ganesh would be departing The Pitt after two seasons. It was reported that her exit was motivated by a "story-driven decision". At Paleyfest, Gemmill said that her character's departure reflected the employee turnover rates in the healthcare profession. On July 22, 2026, Deadline reported that Ganesh joined the supporting cast of the 13 Going on 30 reboot by Netflix, and in November of that year it was announced that Ganesh was starring in the film Portrait by Robert Schwartzman.

=== Theater ===
Ganesh played Vaidehi in the world premiere of Deepak Kumar's House of India at the Old Globe Theatre in San Diego in May 2025. Her capacity to play a complex role and her comedic abilities were both praised.

== Personal life ==
Ganesh came out as queer in May 2025. She uses she/they pronouns.

== Acting credits ==
=== Film ===
Key
†	Denotes films that have not yet been released

Year	Title	Role	Ref.
2022	Pinball: The Man Who Saved the Game	Pamela	
2022	Spoiler Alert	Makeup artist	
TBA	Portrait †	Leah	
TBA	13 Going on 30 †	TBA	

=== Television ===
Year	Title	Role	Notes	Ref.
2018	Blue Bloods	Therapist	Episode: "Thicker Than Water"	
2019	The Enemy Within	Young Mother	Episode: "Black Bear"	
2019	The Village	Hipster Girl	Episode: "Heart on Fire"	
2021	New Amsterdam	Rahel Phillipose	Episode: "In a Strange Land"	
2022	Law & Order: Special Victims Unit	Kayla Stuart	Episode: "Eighteen Wheels a Predator"	
2022	Everything's Trash	Angela	Episode: "Election Night Is Trash"	
2023	Chicago Med	Katie Foreman	Episode: "It's an Ill Wind That Blows Nobody Good"	
2023	Billions	Alexis	Episode: "Game Theory Optimal"	
2023–2024	Grown-ish	Nova	2 episodes	
2025–2026	The Pitt	Dr. Samira Mohan	Main role; 30 episodes (seasons 1–2)	

=== Theater ===
Year	Title	Role	Venue	Notes	Ref.
2025	House of India	Vaidehi	Old Globe Theatre	San Diego	

== Awards and nominations ==
Award	Year	Category	Nominated work	Result	Ref.
Actor Awards	2026	Outstanding Performance by an Ensemble in a Drama Series	The Pitt	Won	
Queerty Awards	2026	Best TV Performance	The Pitt	Nominated	
