= Arena (2011 film) =

- DVD cover
- Directed by: Jonah Loop
- Written by: Robert Martinez; Michael Hultquist
- Produced by: Mike Callaghan; Brad Krevoy; Mark Williams
- Starring: Kellan Lutz; Samuel L. Jackson; Nina Dobrev; Derek Mears; Daniel Dae Kim; James Remar
- Cinematography: Nelson Cragg
- Edited by: Harvey Rosenstock
- Music by: Jeff Danna
- Distributed by: Stage 6 Films
- Release date: October 11, 2011
- Running time: 94 minutes
- Country: United States
- Language: English
- Budget: $10 million

Arena is a 2011 American independent action film directed by Jonah Loop, and starring Kellan Lutz and Samuel L. Jackson.

== Plot ==
The Deathgames is an illegal web-show featuring a modern day gladiator arena where combatants fight to the death. David Lord (Kellan Lutz), a fireman and paramedic, gets into a terrible car accident with his pregnant girlfriend, Lori (Nina Dobrev), who does not survive the crash. Grief-stricken, David drowns his sorrows at a local bar, while a mysterious woman, Milla (Katia Winter), watches him from afar. After witnessing him easily subdue the bar's bouncer, Milla seduces David before incapacitating him and allowing him to be kidnapped.

Milla is a recruiter for The Deathgames, which is run by the confident Logan (Samuel L. Jackson). Logan tells David that he will set him free if he wins ten fights in a row. David accepts on one condition: the tenth and final opponent must be Logan's top henchman Kaden.

For the penultimate fight, Kaden arranges for the release of a South African serial killer named Brutus Jackson (Derek Mears), which leads Logan to believe that Kaden is afraid of David. David defeats Brutus, and Logan is distressed. Logan has a doctor inject into David with a drug that will slow him down and make him an easy victim for Kaden.

As they fight, it is revealed through flashbacks that "David Lord" is the assumed name of a secret government agent who was sent to infiltrate The Deathgames. It is also revealed that Milla secretly switched Logan's drug with a simple saline solution. A group of American soldiers invade the facility. Filled with rage after killing Kaden, David hunts down Logan and corners him in a stockroom. As David is about to strike the deadly blow, soldiers arrive, snapping David out of his murderous fury. Logan escapes.

David's superior, Agent McCarty (James Remar), consoles David as he deals with the fact that he had to kill so many people and assures him that Logan will be caught. Milla apologizes to David as she is escorted away, and McCarty assures David that she is in good hands.

== Cast ==
- Kellan Lutz as FBI Agent David Searle / David Lord / Death Dealer
- Samuel L. Jackson as Logan
- Katia Winter as Milla
- Nina Dobrev as Lori Searle
- Derek Mears as Brutus Jackson
- Kofi Yiadom as Ripper
- Phil Culotta as Mayhem
- Daniel Dae Kim as Taiga Mori / White Samurai
- Amy Le as Akiko Mori
- James Remar as FBI Agent Sam McCarty / Sam Lord
- Johnny Messner as Kaden / The Executioner
- Lauren Shiohama as Kawaii
- Irene Choi as Kaneko
- Brandon Ellison as Scientist
- Mayra Leal as Mexican Bartender
- Sam Medina as Mexican Bouncer

== Development ==
The film had a budget of around $10 million. Filming began in May 2010 in Louisiana. The script was written by Michael Hultquist, Robert Martinez and Tony Giglio. Filming took place in Baton Rouge, Louisiana.

== Reception ==
Arena has received mostly negative reviews focused mostly on the hammy script and shallow plot.
