= Dana Evans (The Pitt) =

Fictional character from The Pitt

- The Pitt character
- Katherine LaNasa as Dana Evans in season one
- First appearance: "7:00 A.M." (2025)
- Created by: R. Scott Gemmill
- Portrayed by: Katherine LaNasa

In-universe information
- Full name: Dana Evans
- Occupation: Charge nurse
- Family: Benji (husband); Two unnamed daughters
- Home: Pittsburgh, Pennsylvania, United States
- Nationality: American

Dana Evans is a fictional character from the HBO Max medical procedural drama series The Pitt, portrayed by American actress Katherine LaNasa. The character was introduced in "7:00 A.M.", the show's pilot episode, and is depicted as the no-nonsense, hard-working and well respected charge nurse in the emergency room of the Pittsburgh Trauma Medical Center with a dry wit and pragmatic, resilient leadership style that keeps everyone in line. During the first season, Dana experiences a traumatic confrontation with a patient that causes her to question her future in nursing.

The character, and LaNasa's portrayal of her, have received acclaim from critics, with LaNasa receiving several awards and nominations, including the Primetime Emmy Award for Outstanding Supporting Actress in a Drama Series.

== Fictional character biography ==
=== Season 1 ===
Dana has over thirty years of experience as a nurse, and her role as charge nurse of the ER at Pittsburgh Trauma Medical Center, affectionally nicknamed "The Pitt", has likely spanned several years due to her level of familiarity with the ER and its staff and operations, as well as her authoritative leadership style. She is shown to have good instincts, recognizing early into her shift that her colleague Dr. Heather Collins is looking unwell, and quickly works out that she is pregnant. Dana agrees to keep the secret at Collins' request, but checks in on her throughout the day, and shares stories about her own pregnancies with her daughters. She also exhibits empathy and care towards the other members of the team, including senior attending physician Michael "Robby" Robinavitch, knowing that the shift is taking place on the anniversary of the death of his mentor, and new medical student Dennis Whitaker, who is struggling to acclimatize, all while juggling her own patients. Dana is shown as unafraid to do what needs to be done, breaking up a fight in the waiting room, teaming up with Dr. Cassie McKay to investigate concerns of a young patient being trafficked, and helping Whitaker to sedate a psychotic patient. She consoles Collins when she reveals her miscarriage. Dana is assaulted by Doug Driscoll, a patient who is frustrated by long waiting times, which blindsides and shakes her, leading her to confess to Robby that she is considering retiring once her shift is over. When a mass shooting takes place at a local music festival, Dana manages the nurses, ensuring the ER has sufficient equipment, keeping the team focused, and providing emotional support to worried staff and traumatised patients. She is approached by Dr. Frank Langdon, who asks her to vouch for him when Robby finds out about his drug use, but Dana reaffirms her trust in Robby's decision to suspend him, and informs him that he must face up to his mistakes. At the end of her shift, Dana removes all of her personal effects from her work station.

=== Season 2 ===
Ten months later, it is revealed that Dana took several months off following the assault and shooting but expresses that she "always finds her way back home" and had resumed working at The Pitt. Her shift on July 4, 2026, begins with the introduction of a new nursing apprentice, Emma Nolan, whom she takes under her wing, informing her of the new safety measures she helped the department implement following the attack by Doug, and encouraging her to show human decency to all patients including a baby jane doe, an unhoused patient, and a patient who has passed away. She is also warm to Langdon, who is returning for his first shift after attending rehab, and encourages Robby to mend fences with him, though he is avoidant. She reveals to Langdon that Doug Driscoll was arrested for assaulting her, though she declined to press charges. Dana is the one who informs the rest of The Pitt staff that the neighboring hospital is shutting down its systems following a cyber attack and helps the team adjust to using analogue measures in order to process and treat patients, calling in former colleague and retired clerk Monica Peters to help with administration duties.

As the sole Sexual Assault Nurse Examiner in the department, Dana administers forensic exams and collects photographic evidence from a young woman, Ilana Miller, as part of a rape kit. Dana has Emma assist with the examination. When the lengthy examinations are complete, Dana takes the kit to lock it inside the special fridge where it will be collected within 72 hours. However, she is enraged to find another kit from two weeks prior, and angrily calls the police station to pick it up. She later supports King, who confides in her that she is afraid of being alone. After, patient Curtis Larson puts Emma in a headlock, Dana intervenes and sedates him with Versed, leaving him with a bloody nose that Dana refuses to explain. She is upset when Robby questions her use of force and administering a controlled substance outside protocol, telling her she could risk losing her nursing license. Robby later confronts Dana while she is on a smoke break, deducing that the Versed has always been ready in her pocket in the event Doug Driscoll ever returned. Dana in turn confronts Robby over his erratic behavior throughout the day, concerned that Robby may be suicidal, and argues that Robby's real anger is directed at himself. She also admonishes Robby to stop tormenting himself over whether the ER will survive in his absence, accusing him of having a martyr complex.

== Development ==
=== Casting ===
LaNasa's casting as Dana was announced on July 12, 2024, alongside the announcement of eight other cast members. During the audition process, LaNasa crafted an "elaborate backstory" for the character spanning from losing her father at an early age and her working-class background, to what type of house she would live in and what she had planned for after the shift that is depicted during the first season.

=== Characterization ===
Regarding her characterization, LaNasa felt it was important for Dana to have a "blue collar voice" that was specific to Pittsburgh. She also noted that Dana reminds her a lot of her mother, who was a tough woman who worked while raised eight children and stated that she viewed Dana as a "basketball coach" who is always moving around the ER and assessing the situation.

Of Dana's assault, LaNasa said that a nurse she knew confirmed that it "is very common for the nurses to get hit, punched, kicked bit, you name it." She explained, "I was really glad to be able to show the human condition of a working woman that's hit in her workplace and the dilemma that it creates for Dana." Regarding how Dana will be impacted in the future, LaNasa added, "I think we see Dana go through an existential crisis of sorts, and we see her grapple with how to process this violence. I don't think she wants to face what happened to her." LaNasa later expressed that she felt Dana being punched in the face by Doug Driscoll uncovered some of the character's "buried grief" and argued that Dana chooses to focus on dealing with her patient's problems in order to avoid her one trauma stating, "I think the punch … in a way, made it impossible for her to go back to the place where she gets all of her self-esteem, all of her sense of self, but also where she hides. There was nothing left to do but to face that." In LaNasa's head, Dana was encouraged by one of her daughters to take time off work and seek support in the form of therapy and self-defence classes in between the first and second seasons, but that she chose to return to The Pitt because nursing is a core part of her identity. LaNasa explained, "from a lot of the nurses that I’ve talked to, they do it because they know they’re good at it, and it's important work that not everybody can do. I think it feels really good to be that person — it feels like noble work. I don’t think she could turn away from that." She stated that Dana's protection of Emma during season two is "a kind of reaction to the punch" and that ensuring the other nurses stay safe at work helps to "heal part of herself".

Discussing Dana's headspace following the ending of season one, Noah Wyle stated, "obviously, Dana is an important part [of this show]. But Dana choosing to come back — if she chooses to come back, and how she comes back, and what Dana is like having made the decision to come back, and what she's going to allow this place to either do or not do to her going forward, becomes the stuff that, you know, is the grist for the mill", with creator R. Scott Gemmill adding that Dana is "going to have a bit of an attitude adjustment, though. She'll be even less tolerant of bulls—t. She's going to be much more protective of her flock" following her experience with Doug Driscoll.

== Reception ==
The character of Dana, and LaNasa's performance, have received critical acclaim. Thomas Butt of Collider declared Dana "the show's greatest character", and called her the "anchor", "backbone", and "emotional rock" of The Pitt, and "the captain steering everyone in the right direction". He also cited Dana's assault and subsequent contemplation of early retirement as "one of the most upsetting character developments of the season" because the character had seemed "truly invincible". He wrote, "it's no surprise that the no-nonsense, resilient nurse, who serves as a watchful guardian to all the surrounding drama, became a fan-favorite. Dana's candor, rejecting any disrespect thrown at her or her colleagues, as well as her pure dignity, gave her instant icon status. On the flip side, she is also incredibly affectionate, expressing sincere care for the well-being of the staff, something the stern and reticent Robby struggles to convey. Whether she's busting Robby's chops or defusing the drama between Langdon and Santos, Dana provides much-needed levity to the 45-minute stress factory that is each episode." Similarly, Sean Morrison of Screen Rant also felt that Dana was "one of the best characters in the show" and praised her "unique mixture of kindness and tough love", "playful jabs" and "light-hearted banter" for helping balance out the more serious tone of the series, and stated that her role as charge nurse helps her to "tie all the other characters together and act as a confidant to everyone else at the hospital".

=== Awards and nominations ===
For her portrayal as Dana, LaNasa won the Primetime Emmy Award for Outstanding Supporting Actress in a Drama Series at the 77th Primetime Emmy Awards, and the Critics' Choice Television Award for Best Supporting Actress in a Drama Series at the 31st Critics' Choice Awards. In addition, she received nominations for Best Supporting TV Performance at the Dorian Awards, and Outstanding Supporting Performance in a Drama Series at the 2nd Gotham TV Awards. She also won the Screen Actors Guild Award for Outstanding Performance by an Ensemble in a Drama Series at the 32nd Actor Awards alongside the rest of the cast.

For her performance in the second season episode "6:00 P.M.",TVLine named LaNasa their "Performer of the Week". The site wrote, "LaNasa was at her very best in Episode 12, as Dana came down from Emma's assault and contended with an equally acerbic Robby. Noah Wyle was also excellent here, navigating new terrain opposite LaNasa as Robby and Dana locked horns — two deeply damaged characters who refused to face their trauma, neither of whom wanted to hear the other say it out loud. What made Wyle so superb here, however, was how he revved up LaNasa, resulting in career-best work from the onetime character actress, who already struck gold at the Emmys last fall and, with this hour, has all but assured herself a repeat nomination."
