= Lucas Iverson =

American actor (born 1995)

- Born: February 1995 (age 31)
- Occupation: Actor
- Known for: The Pitt

Lucas Iverson (born February 1995) is an American theatre and television actor. He is best known for his role as James Ogilvie in the second season of the HBO Max medical drama series The Pitt.

== Early life and education ==
Lucas Iverson is from Baltimore, Maryland. He was born with a birth defect that required frequent medical attention during his early years. He attended Loyola Blakefield, where he participated in the speech and debate team.

As a child, he would travel to Washington D.C. to enjoy the local theaters there. His parents encouraged him to join his middle school's drama club to distract him from making trouble elsewhere, and he was inspired to pursue acting at the age of 16 after performing in a production of Our Town. He earned a Bachelor of Fine Arts from Adelphi University, then graduated from the David Geffen School of Drama at Yale University, where he studied with Patrick Ball.

== Career ==
Iverson has performed at the Yale Repertory Theatre, the Williamstown Theatre Festival, the Shakespeare Theatre of New Jersey and the Texas Shakespeare Festival. He has also contributed to Shakespeare productions staged in schools and juvenile detention centres. He will perform in the Shakespeare Theatre Company's production of Othello, produced by Simon Godwin, in spring 2026, playing Cassio.

His first television role was in The Gilded Age. In March 2026, Iverson confirmed he will be returning to the show with an expanded role.

In 2025, he left a production of Emily Burns' Frankenstein, where he played the Creature, to join the second season of The Pitt as student doctor James Ogilvie. This is considered to be his breakout role. He had previously auditioned for the role of Dennis Whitaker. Iverson has spoken about studying castmate Gerran Howell's performance to improve his own as Ogilvie.
