= Trinity Santos =

Fictional character from The Pitt

- The Pitt character
- Isa Briones as Trinity Santos in season 1
- First appearance: "7:00 A.M." (2025)
- Created by: R. Scott Gemmill
- Portrayed by: Isa Briones

In-universe information
- Occupation: Intern (season 1); Second-year resident (season 2)

Trinity Santos is a fictional character from the HBO Max medical procedural drama series The Pitt, portrayed by American actor Isa Briones. She is introduced in "7:00 A.M.", the show's pilot episode, as a headstrong young doctor eager to learn complex procedures. Santos initially clashes with some of her colleagues—especially Dr. Frank Langdon, who she discovers has been stealing medication from the hospital. The consequences of this discovery follow Santos into the second season as she additionally struggles with an increased workload.

Although Santos has been described as cocky and ambitious, the complexity of her character has been conveyed through her passionate protection of abuse victims.

== Fictional character biography ==
=== Background ===
Trinity Santos was formerly an athlete/gymnast, which Briones says is "where her competitiveness really comes from". She is fluent in Tagalog.

=== Season 1 ===
Santos begins as an intern. Alongside Dr. Melissa King, Dennis Whitaker and Victoria Javadi, it is her first day working at the Pittsburgh Trauma Medical Center, and she proves her confidence from the outset. She enthusiastically rushes to intense trauma cases and is eager to learn advanced procedures.

Santos is not immediately liked by her colleagues. She nicknames her colleagues; Whitaker with "Huckleberry", a reference to his rural upbringing, and Javadi with "Crash", after Javadi had fainted. When Santos swears in front of a patient, she is criticized by Dr. Heather Collins, and Dr. Samira Mohan lambasts her insensitive bedside manner. Santos' bold behavior is, however, encouraged by surgical resident Dr. Yolanda Garcia.

Santos’ relationship with Garcia develops throughout the season. Garcia guides Santos as she teaches her to perform a fasciotomy. Their budding bond is harmed when Santos accidentally drops a scalpel that stabs Garcia in the foot. Later in the day, they reconcile, but Garcia dismisses Santos' concerns about Dr. Frank Langdon.

Early into her shift, Santos clashes with Langdon. He rebukes her for performing a trigger point injection on a patient without presenting the case to him first and for mistakenly deciding to put a patient on BiPAP. He later yells at Santos for a mistake she covered Mohan for. He also accuses Santos of lacking teamwork skills. Tension continues as, after finding inconsistencies in medication handled by him, Santos believes Langdon had been stealing benzodiazepines. She eventually informs Dr. Michael Robinavitch, the attending physician. He forces Langdon to leave. Later on, Robby praises Santos for telling the truth about Langdon.

When she learns that a patient named Silas is suspected of sexually abusing his daughter, Santos wants to take action against him. However, social worker Kiara Alfaro is unable to report it because the daughter, Alana, refuses to admit to experiencing any abuse, despite Santos' urging. Santos, frustrated by this, threatens an intubated Silas to never touch Alana again.

When victims of the Pittfest shooting arrive, Santos works with Whitaker and Mel to treat patients with extremity wounds. She performs a REBOA. Although night shift attending physician Dr. Jack Abbot tells her she should not have done the procedure without a superior's supervision, he also praises her for saving the patient's life. Santos also notices that one of the new patients is, in reality, a reporter pretending to be a victim so he can record inside the hospital. Santos exposes him and dumps his phone in a mop bucket cart of bloody water.

After the Pittfest rush calms down, Santos treats a patient who survived a suicide attempt. She reveals to this patient that, as a child, she and her friend were taken advantage of by someone older, with her friend eventually committing suicide.

At the end of the day, Santos secretly follows Whitaker to one of the empty rooms of the hospital's unused wing. She discovers that he is homeless and has been living there. Santos tentatively invites Whitaker to move into her apartment that night, making them roommates.

=== Season 2 ===
By the second season, Santos has become a second-year resident. This advanced position comes with an increased workload, as she particularly struggles to finish her medical charting. This is noticed by Dr. Baran Al-Hashimi, the new attending physician, who reminds Santos that she might have to repeat her second year of residency if she can't catch up.

Between charting, Santos treats nine-year-old Kylie Connors. Seeing Kylie's bruising, Santos suspects that she is being abused, but she discovers that Kylie has immune thrombocytopenic purpura, an autoimmune disorder that can cause bruises. Santos works with Mel to convince a patient to seek help for her bulimia. She treats Harlow Graham, a deaf patient, although they struggle to communicate with each other because Santos does not know sign language and the hospital's video relay interpreter device is faulty. Santos also checks on Baby Jane Doe and, after initially irritated by the infant's crying, she sings "Ili-Ili, Tulog Anay", a traditional Hiligaynon lullaby, to calm the baby. Santos reacts strongly when social worker Dylan Easton says that Jude Augustine, the boy whom she tends to for losing his two fingers in a firecracker explosion, might ultimately be better off with his parents back in Haiti rather than his legal guardian older sister.

Another source of stress for Santos is the return of Langdon. They had not seen each other since the events of season one, and, unlike some of her colleagues, Santos does not celebrate Langdon's return and struggles to work with him. Langdon attempts to apologize to Santos for his past behavior, but she rejects his apology saying that true accountability would mean admitting to the staff that he stole medications from the hospital. Santos expresses worry that Langdon will relapse to Robby, for which Robby asks her not to let old conflicts get in her way.

Santos' relationship with Garcia has evolved since season one. They had planned to watch 4th of July fireworks together in the evening, but Garcia canceled it. Later, Garcia reiterates the casual status of their relationship and states that she is unwilling to listen to Santos talk about Langdon again.

Santos is still roommates with Whitaker after 10 months. Santos tells Robby that Whitaker has been frequently visiting the widow of a dead patient from the last season, and worries that the widow is using him. Later, they both talk, with Santos saying how she feels with Robby leaving on his sabbatical, how Langdon is and was, that she felt Garcia was using her as a "stress toy", and vaguely about Whitaker moving out. Whitaker figures it out and says he will not move out and stay in their apartment if Santos confesses that she likes being roommates with him, playfully, to which she does not accept.

Santos' backstory is subtly expanded on during this season. In episode "1:00 P.M.", when Santos goes to the bathroom, it is revealed that she has self-harm scars along her thigh. Later in the season, she takes a scalpel and puts it in her pocket, the implication being that she is considering self-harming again.

== Development ==
=== Casting ===
Series creator R. Scott Gemmill identified Briones as his choice for the role early in the casting process, but encountered opposition from executives concerned about "potential unlikability." He scripted a scene where Santos confronts a potential abusive father, subsequently used in the seventh episode of the first season, specifically to convince one studio executive that Briones was right for the role. Her casting as Santos was announced on July 12, 2024 alongside eight other cast members.

In the original pilot script for The Pitt, the character was referred to as "Trinity Shah", and described only as being Asian. The producers left the role's ethnicity to be determined during the casting process. Upon her casting, Briones advocated for a change in her character's name to represent her Filipino heritage, reflecting the strong Filipino representation in the medical industry. Santos delivers a line in Tagalog to two gossiping Filipino nurses in the season 1 episode "5:00 P.M.", confirming their suspicions that she actually is Filipino.

=== Characterization ===
Briones said that Santos wants to protect her vulnerable patients, and that "[t]here's a maternal and big sister type of energy that comes out when she is taking care of younger patients".

HBO Max described her as "tough as nails with no filter", also saying that her "competitive streak hasn't gone away — she just channels it into her work". In an interview with Vulture, talking about Langdon and Santos's relationship in season 1, Briones said "They're so combative because they recognize in each other what they have in themselves, and that's threatening to the both of them". Vulture also said about episode 12 in season 2 that "The slow burn of Santos getting repeatedly plowed over with stress and emotion has led her to contemplate self-harm again".

With Langdon coming back in season 2 after going to rehab, Briones said that it was a major trigger for Santos. She said that "the reintroduction of Langdon reignited a lot of the anxieties around the feeling of not belonging. And with Robby leaving [on his sabbatical], she's losing that safe space". Filmspeak said that Whitaker's relationship to Santos was like a "surrogate brother".

== Reception ==
Briones won the Screen Actors Guild Award for Outstanding Performance by an Ensemble in a Drama Series at the 32nd Actor Awards alongside the rest of the cast.

Vogue described her in season 1 as "the cocky, competitive new intern, brash to the point of abrasion", but also saying that "[Santos] is also protecting something deep inside herself, evident in the way she is especially attuned to victims of abuse".

Yahoo said that Santos was "[o]verly ambitious, unnecessarily competitive, ungovernable, and conceited" but nevertheless "on the top of [their] collective hit list".
