= Gerran Howell =

Welsh actor (born 1991)

- Born: 25 February 1991 (age 35); Barry, Wales
- Occupation: Actor
- Years active: 2006–present
- Known for: The Pitt; Young Dracula

Gerran Howell (/ˈɡɛrən/ GHE-rən, born 25 February 1991) is a Welsh actor. He began his career starring as the titular character of the CBBC series Young Dracula (2006–2014). He is known for his roles in the Hulu miniseries Catch-22 (2019) as Kid Sampson and the HBO Max medical drama The Pitt (2025–present) as Dennis Whitaker, a performance which was nominated for the Primetime Emmy Award for Outstanding Supporting Actor in a Drama Series in 2026.

== Early life ==
Howell grew up in Barry Island, Wales. His mother was the head teacher of High Street Primary School, while his father also worked as a teacher in Barry. Howell attended Barry Comprehensive School.

Howell became interested in acting because he enjoyed watching films. He began acting when Karen Walters (the head of the drama department at Barry Comprehensive and a friend of his mother's) cast him in school plays. He first performed in a production of Blood Brothers. His passion for acting further developed by participating in an after-school improvisation class called Actsly in Cardiff Bay, and later went on to study at the Royal Academy of Dramatic Art in London.

== Career ==
=== Film and television ===
From 2006 until 2014, Howell starred in the CBBC children's horror-comedy show Young Dracula. He played Vladimir Dracula, a reluctant young vampire who moves with his family from Transylvania to Wales. He secured the role after the casting director visited the after-school improvisation class that Howell attended in Cardiff. Reflecting in 2026, Howell stated that working on Young Dracula taught him about the etiquette of being on a filming set. Howell also appeared as Ernesto in the CBBC drama The Sparticle Mystery (2011–2015) and as Jacob Seaton in the comedy series This Country (2017–2020).

In 2019, Howell appeared in the miniseries Catch-22 as Kid Sampson. One of the first actors to be cast in the series, director George Clooney personally selected Howell for the role after watching his audition tape. Later that year, Howell appeared as Private Parry in the 2019 film 1917. In 2022, Howell starred in Freedom's Path as William, a Union soldier who befriends a runaway slave, played by RJ Cyler. His performance received a positive critical reception. In 2024, he appeared as DC Simon Evans in the television series Ludwig.

==== The Pitt ====
In July 2024, it was announced that Howell was joining the cast of the upcoming HBO Max medical procedural drama The Pitt. After being invited to submit a self-tape audition, he had been unsure if he would receive the role because he was not based in Los Angeles. It has been reported that he was recommended for the role by George Clooney, with whom he had worked on Catch-22. To prepare for the role of medical student Dennis Whitaker, Howell engaged in a "boot camp" training period alongside castmates Isa Briones and Shabana Azeez, in which he was taught about medical procedures. He likened it to "medical school crammed into two weeks". Season one of The Pitt began airing on 9 January 2025, and Howell returned for season two, which premiered on 8 January 2026. On 16 April 2026, it was confirmed by R. Scott Gemmill that Howell will be returning for the show's third season, which will air in January 2027.

Howell's performance as Dennis Whitaker received praise for its authenticity and for providing comic relief. His American accent was also commended. Collectively with his costars, Howell won the Actor Award for Outstanding Performance by an Ensemble in a Drama Series for 2025. On 8 July 2026, he was nominated for a Primetime Emmy Award for Outstanding Supporting Actor in a Drama Series, alongside his co-stars Patrick Ball and Shawn Hatosy.

=== Other work ===
In addition to his work on-screen, he has also recorded voice-overs for radio adverts and video games: in the Xenoblade series, he voiced the supporting characters Milton and Joran.

== Personal life ==
Howell resides dually in both Los Angeles and east London, with his cat Skinny. He returns to Barry often, particularly during Christmas.

He has described experiencing imposter syndrome, particularly while filming The Pitt.

In 2026, Howell became an official partner of the Welsh charity Latch, which supports families impacted by childhood cancer.

== Filmography ==
=== Film ===
Year	Title	Role	Notes	Ref.
2006	Crusade in Jeans	Baudonin		
2014	Queen and Country	Kitto		
2019	The Song of Names	Young Martin Simmonds		
2019	1917	Private Parry		
2020	Willy and the Guardians of the Lake	Willy	Title character (voice role, UK version)	
2022	Freedom's Path	William		

=== Television ===
Year	Title	Role	Notes	Ref.
2006	Casualty	Niall Andrews	Episode: "Blind Spots"	
2006–2014	Young Dracula	Vladimir Dracula	Title character	
2011–2015	The Sparticle Mystery	Ernesto	1 episode (series 1), recurring role (series 2), main cast (series 3)	
2012	Casualty	Rory Brothwick	Episode: "Hero Syndrome"	
2012	Some Girls	Ryan	1 episode	
2015	Drifters	Callum	Episode: "Wedding"	
2017	Emerald City	Jack	Main cast	
2017	Strike Back	Alexsander	Episode: "Retribution"	
2018	This Country	Jacob Seaton	Episode: "The Vicar's Son"	
2018	Genius	Karl-Heinz Wiegels	Episode: "Picasso"	
2019	Catch-22	Kid Sampson	Miniseries, main cast	
2022	Suspicion	Leonardo "Leo" Newman	Recurring role	
2022	McDonald & Dodds	Fulton Harte (alias: Father Luton)	Episode: "Clouds Across the Moon"	
2024	Ludwig	DC Simon Evans	Main cast (series 1)	
2025–present	The Pitt	Dennis Whitaker	Main cast	
2025	Out There	Rhys Simpson	Main cast	

=== Video games ===
Year	Title	Role	Notes	Ref.
2018	Déraciné	Herman		
2018	Xenoblade Chronicles 2: Torna – The Golden Country	Milton		
2022	Xenoblade Chronicles 3	Joran		
2023	Lies of P	Toma / Lonely Puppet / Wandering Merchent		

== Awards and honors ==
Year	Award	Category	Work	Result	Ref.
2026	Actor Awards	Outstanding Performance by an Ensemble in a Drama Series	The Pitt	Won	
2026	Primetime Emmy Awards	Outstanding Supporting Actor in a Drama Series	The Pitt	Nominated	
