= Dennis Whitaker =

Fictional character from The Pitt

- The Pitt character
- Gerran Howell as Dennis Whitaker in the second season
- First appearance: "7:00 A.M." (2025)
- Created by: R. Scott Gemmill
- Portrayed by: Gerran Howell

In-universe information
- Full name: Dennis Whitaker
- Nickname: Huckleberry
- Occupation: First-year resident physician (season 2); Fourth-year medical student (season 1)
- Home: Pittsburgh, Pennsylvania, United States; Broken Bow, Nebraska, United States
- Nationality: American

Dennis Whitaker is a fictional character from the HBO Max medical procedural drama series The Pitt, portrayed by Welsh actor Gerran Howell. The character was introduced in "7:00 A.M.", the show's pilot episode, where he begins his first day as a fourth-year medical student in the emergency room of the Pittsburgh Trauma Medical Center. Whitaker is depicted as a determined and empathetic person who initially lacks confidence and experiences several setbacks which make him question his career path, including a recurring joke in the series where he is constantly covered in various bodily fluids. By the second season, he has developed into a more self-assured practitioner and begins mentoring some of the newer members of the department.

== Fictional character biography ==
=== Season 1 ===
Dennis is originally from Broken Bow, Nebraska where he lived on his family's farm alongside his parents and three brothers before leaving to pursue his dreams in medicine, becoming the first in his family to go to college. He begins his rotation at the emergency room of Pittsburgh Trauma Medical Center, affectionately nicknamed "The Pitt", as a fourth year medical student alongside fellow student Victoria Javadi, and residents Trinity Santos and Mel King, working under the guidance of senior attending Dr. Michael "Robby" Robinavitch, and the other doctors.

He initially has a contentious relationship with the cocky and ambitious Santos, who immediately starts referring to him as "Huckleberry" even before learning of his rural background, and teases him for his mild-mannered disposition and lack of confidence.

Whitaker has a difficult start to his first day when he is injured when transferring a patient to a bed, crushing his index finger, and gets repeatedly soiled by patients’ bodily fluids. He subsequently loses his first patient, a man named Bennet Milton whom he had connected with, and struggles to accept that there was nothing he could have done to prevent it.

Following Bennet's death, Whitaker is reluctant to return to treating patients, but is encouraged by third-year resident Samira Mohan to face his fears. He later joins charge nurse Dana Evans and several of the other nurses with subduing an unhoused patient suffering from drug-induced psychosis that the staff refer to as "The Kraken", and impresses them by showing compassion and treating him humanely, leading him to subsequently volunteer to join a doctor's outreach programme specifically working with the homeless population to ensure the man receives adequate follow-up care.

His farm background comes in useful when he successfully catches and kills a rat that was in the department. When there is a mass shooting at a local music festival, Whitaker, King, and Santos are assigned to deal with patients who have extremity wounds. When he is sent to collect more supplies, he finds Robby in the midst of a panic attack and emotional breakdown, but is able to reassure him and convince him to return to the ER by imparting some advice that Robby had told him earlier that morning. At the end of the shift, Whitaker is secretly followed by Santos, who discovers that he is homeless and squatting in an abandoned wing of the hospital. She offers for him to stay in her spare room, which he accepts.

=== Season 2 ===
Ten months later, Whitaker is now a first-year resident and is still living with Santos. He begins mentoring James Ogilvie and Joy Kwon, The Pitt's new medical students, but clashes with Ogilvie's brash attitude and Kwon's apparent disinterest in caring for patients.

When an elderly man is brought in from a nursing home, Whitaker recognizes the man has a POLST in place and advises that all they can do is make him comfortable in his final moments. When he passes away, Whitaker has Joy and Ogilvie remain to observe a moment of silence, while Robby watches with pride.

His status as Robby's new protegee causes tension between Whitaker and Dr. Frank Langdon, Robby's previous mentee who was forced to leave the department after his drug addiction was uncovered, as when Frank returns to work, Whitaker inadvertently makes a comment about himself being the doctor who should order the medication for one of their shared patients.

Having been told by Santos that Whitaker has started spending a lot of time with the wife and baby of a former patient who passed away, Robby gently instructs him not to continue the relationship and to maintain professional boundaries, while Whitaker insists that he is just helping them out due to his own experience with working on a farm. Robby then asks if Whitaker will house-sit for him while he is away on his sabbatical, which Whitaker accepts. Accepting this offer causes tension with Santos, who refuses to admit if she genuinely enjoys having him as a roommate.

When Ogilvie struggles with the death of a patient and questions if he wants to continue his emergency medicine rotation, Whitaker comforts him. He tells Ogilvie that death is an expected part of their job and that they must find ways to accept it, reiterating advice given by Robby in season one. Whitaker also reveals that he practices emergency medicine because he enjoys helping people when they are in difficult times.

== Development ==
=== Casting ===
Howell's casting as Whitaker was announced on July 12, 2024 alongside the announcement of eight other cast members. He had been recommended for the role by George Clooney, who Howell had worked with on Catch-22.

=== Characterization ===
Howell feels that Whitaker acts as "the audience's point of view if they can't relate to the very complicated medicine that's going on", and described him as having "the worst day of his life" during the first season, which covers his first shift at The Pitt. He explained that the character's empathy comes from being someone who is "a bit lost in his family" and having to "fight for attention", but feels that he "genuinely cares" about his patients and helping people in need, though Howell also feels that this can sometimes be Whitaker's "downfall" because he can struggle with when to put up boundaries and protect himself in the high-pressure environment of the emergency room. Of his character, Howell stated, "his sort of big obstacle is just his confidence. And the fact everything is so overwhelming, him being from like a small rural community, I think his biggest pitfall is just, it’s just a lot, like, being in a big city and then an emergency department on top of that. But I think there’s obviously real competence there. And…he just has to get past [figuring out] how to how to interact with people in this situation.” On the other hand, “I think his strength is the resilience, that he does bounce back from all of these things…I think he kicks himself, but he keeps going. So, I guess that’s sort of that’s commendable — I hope".

In terms of professional relationships, Howell described Robby as Whitaker's "anchor" during the first season because he "gives him the most down-to-earth advice", and felt he was "absolutely terrified" of Santos because she is the "complete opposite" of him, particularly due to her over-confident nature. Discussing Whitaker's progression between the first and second seasons, Howell noted the character's increased confidence and idolisation of Robby, explaining that "he's massively influenced by Robby. That first shift was a nightmare for everyone. Robby would never admit it, but I think they see each other. Whitaker is just enamored by Robby and is just following in his footsteps a little bit." Howell considers the scene where Whitaker finds Robby having a panic attack during the first season a moment where the character was able to "step-up" and shows how capable of a doctor he can be, and felt it was a very valuable scene for the two characters and helped to establish a closer working relationship between them. Noah Wyle, who portrays Robby, felt that Whitaker was Robby's "new favorite" by the start of the second season following his fallout with Dr. Langdon in season one, and stated, "to have, you know, our Nebraska farmboy, Whitaker, who was the butt of every joke and on the receiving end of every fluid, become a confident physician in his own right was gratifying to the character." On Whitaker and Robby's relationship, Howell explained that he felt the two men had a "weird trauma bond" because they had seen each other "at their lowest" and that Robby subtly shows this through various ways throughout the series, adding that this also creates an "awkward" dynamic between Whitaker and Langdon. Howell also noted that Whitaker living with Santos, who was instrumental in exposing Langdon's drug use in season one, will have influenced his own feelings towards Langdon, explaining, "I don’t think he necessarily has too much beef with Langdon, but he knows instantly, ‘I’m going to kind of be in the middle of a sticky situation here. Who do I …’ I think his allegiance is with Santos for now, but he wants to remain as professional as he can, so, it’s making things awkward this shift."

Howell expressed that he enjoyed seeing Whitaker's improvement as a physician when he began receiving scripts for season two, joking that "there's no way [he] could be this incompetent after ten months", and believed that he had "found his stride", but added that there was a "new experience" to challenge Whitaker by having him mentor the two new medical students. Howell expressed that Whitaker would be reluctant to take on the teaching aspect of working at the hospital because he lacked the confidence to believe he would reach a level where that task would be expected of him. Despite this, he felt Whitaker is "actually quite good at managing personalities when it matters" due to his upbringing with his brothers. Despite his growth in confidence, Howell was careful to ensure Whitaker did not come across as too efficient, noting, "I didn't want to come in Season 2 like a slick TV doctor. He's not the finished article. He's still vulnerable, but you're kind of seeing him improve and get better in real time."

== Reception ==
The character of Whitaker, and Howell's performance, have received a positive critical reception. Ahead of the show's second season, Esquire referred to him as the "not-so-secret weapon of The Pitt", noting how the character is often featured as the "audience's stand-in amidst the chaos of the emergency room". Entertainment Weekly wrote that, "Howell brings his mousy charm to the insecure Dennis Whitaker". Erin Konrad of Collider wrote that she enjoyed the humor associated with the character, noting that it makes the show a "must-watch" and helps give viewers an insight into his "kind-hearted" character that she found herself "rooting for more than any other character" on the show. She also felt that the levity offered in these moments, particularly when Whitaker was repeatedly having to change his scrubs after they were soiled by various bodily fluids, as a necessary contrast to the show's serious storylines.

Howell won the Screen Actors Guild Award for Outstanding Performance by an Ensemble in a Drama Series at the 32nd Actor Awards alongside the rest of the cast.
