= Press Ganey =

South Bend, Indiana-based health care company

Press Ganey Associates LLC
- Type: Private
- Industry: Health care
- Founded: 1985; 41 years ago
- Headquarters: South Bend, Indiana, United States
- Key people: Patrick T. Ryan (Chairman); Thomas Lee, MD (CMO) Kyle Ferguson (President & CCO); Eric Wilson (CTO)
- Number of employees: 3,450 (2026)
- Parent: Qualtrics
- Website: www.pressganey.com

Press Ganey Associates LLC is an American multinational healthcare performance improvement and experience management company. As of January 2017, its Medical Practice Survey was the most widely used outpatient satisfaction survey in the United States. Press Ganey was acquired by Qualtrics in May 2026 to combine its healthcare, clinical, and regulatory data with Qualtrics' AI platform to create a proprietary dataset for human data.

== History ==
Press Ganey Associates was founded in 1985 by medical anthropologist Irwin Press and sociologist-statistician Rod Ganey, both of whom were then professors at the University of Notre Dame. Over the next fifteen years, the company's client base, which initially consisted of only a few hospitals, grew steadily in size.

In 1993, Mel Hall began working at Press Ganey, and in 2001, he became its CEO. He remained the company's CEO until stepping down in 2012 to found the Nashville-based medical staffing firm SpecialtyCare.

The Center for Medicare and Medicaid Services previously used Press Ganey's survey to measure patient satisfaction, but in 2012, after the survey was widely criticized, they replaced it with the Hospital Consumer Assessment of Healthcare Providers and Systems (HCAHPS). As of November 2016, Press Ganey's surveys are in use at more than 10,000 medical institutions.

In 2020, Press Ganey acquired NarrativeDx, a patented natural language processing platform built specifically for the language of healthcare. They also acquired Doctor.com, a digital platform in provider directories, online bookings and provider analysis.

Press Ganey acquired SPH Analytics, a company providing customer experience measurement and engagement for the health insurance industry in May 2021. SPH deploys an analytical and predictive approach to measure and report the consumer experience.

In April 2022, Press Ganey acquired the market research, customer experience and employee experience technology business Forsta, thus expanding beyond the healthcare industry.

In 2025, the company acquired Hyperlift Logic, a healthcare analytics company specializing in Medicare Advantage Stars performance. In May, Press Ganey acquired InMoment, a customer experience technology company specializing in AI-driven experience management and analytics.

In October 2025, privately owned customer service firm Qualtrics announced the acquisition of Press Ganey for $6.75 billion, including debt. The acquisition was completed in May 2026.

In March of the same year, Press Ganey was recognized as a Leader in the 2025-2026 IDC MarketScape for Worldwide Voice of the Customer Applications. In 2026, Press Ganey Forsta was recognized as a Leader in the Gartner Magic Quadrant for Voice of the Customer Platforms.
