= Laëtitia Hollard =

American actress

- Born: May 31, 2003 (age 23); United States
- Education: Juilliard School (BFA)
- Occupation: Actress
- Years active: 2015–present

Laëtitia Hollard (born May 31st, 2003) is an American actress. She is known for her role as nurse Emma Nolan on the HBO Max medical drama television series The Pitt (2025–present).

== Early life ==
Hollard was born in the United States to parents with French and Guadeloupean roots. She identifies as Afro-Caribbean. She was raised in McFarland, Wisconsin and graduated from McFarland High School. She later graduated from Juilliard in 2025 with a degree in drama.

== Career ==
After graduating from Juilliard, Hollard made her on-screen debut playing nurse Emma Nolan in season 2 of The Pitt on HBO Max. Her performance was praised by her costars, with Katherine LaNasa (charge nurse Dana Evans) telling People "the actress who played Emma knocked it out of the park and I'm really, really proud of her."

== Acting credits ==
Key
†	Denotes films that have not yet been released

=== Film ===
Year	Title	Role	Notes	Ref.
TBA	Larry Fessenden’s Trauma Or, Monsters All †		In post-production	

=== Television ===
Year	Title	Role	Notes	Ref.
2026	The Pitt	Nurse Emma Nolan	Recurring role	

=== Theater ===
Year	Title	Role	Venue	Notes	Ref.
2017	To The Promised Land	Ruth	Children’s Theater of Madison		
2020	Peter Pan	Peter Pan	Children’s Theater of Madison		
