= Isa Briones =

American actor (born 1999)

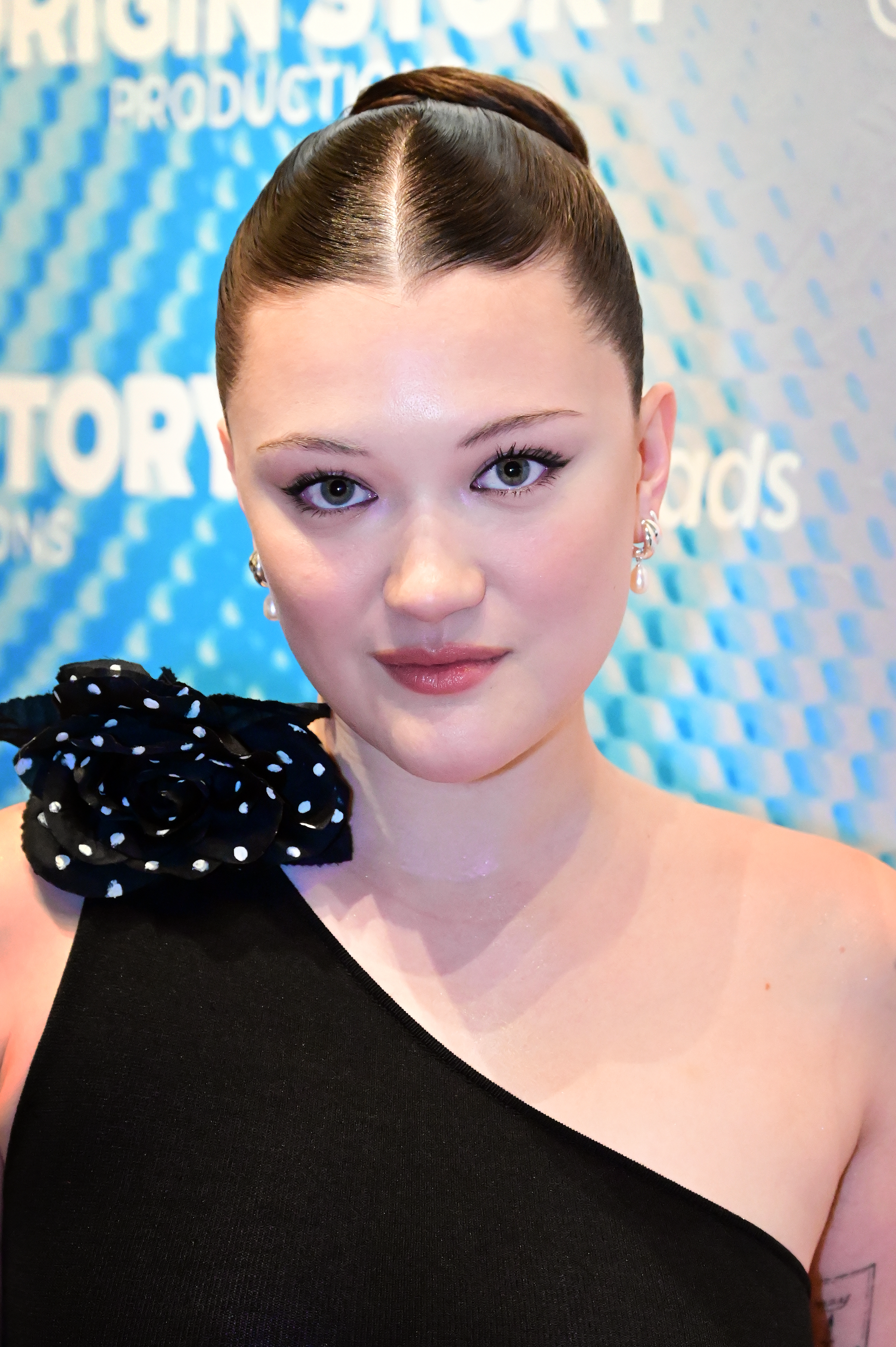
- Briones in 2026
- Born: Isabella Camille Briones; January 17, 1999 (age 27); London, England
- Citizenship: United States
- Occupations: Actor; singer
- Years active: 2008–present
- Father: Jon Jon Briones
- Relatives: Teo Briones (brother)

Isabella Camille Briones (/ˈiːsə briːˈoʊnɛs/ EE-suh bree-OH-nes; born January 17, 1999) is an American actor and singer, born in London and raised in Los Angeles. She rose to prominence for her starring roles in the CBS / Paramount+ series Star Trek: Picard (2020–2022), including Soji, an android "daughter" of Data. She also starred as Margot Stokes in the first season of the Disney+/Hulu series Goosebumps (2023) and as Dr. Trinity Santos in the HBO Max medical drama The Pitt (2025–present).

Briones began her career as a model in New York City at age three, and started acting in feature films and stage productions in 2008. She won the Ovation Award for Featured Actress In a Musical for Next to Normal (2018) in Los Angeles. Afterwards, she returned to New York, becoming the youngest performer in the first touring company of Hamilton. Later, she made her Broadway debut playing Eurydice in Hadestown (2024) alongside her father Jon Jon Briones, who was cast as Hermes.

On September 30th, 2026, Briones was named on the Time100 Next 2026: The World's Most Influential Rising Stars List with a statement written by fellow The Pitt co-star Katherine LaNasa.

== Early life ==
Briones was born in London, England to Jon Jon Briones and Megan Briones (née Johnson) and she has a younger brother, Teo Briones. Her family members are all musical theater actors. She is Filipino on her father's side and Swedish and Irish matrilineally.

Her parents met in Stuttgart while auditioning for Miss Saigon; her father was closing its West End theatre production when Briones was born. She was ten months old when her family moved from London to New York City, where she began to model at age three. In 2006, when Briones was seven, her family moved to Los Angeles.

Briones learned acting and singing at home from her parents. She majored in theatre and musical theatre at the Los Angeles County High School for the Arts.

== Career ==
=== Film and television ===
Briones began her acting career as a child in 2008. She appeared in television commercials and played supporting roles in feature films, including Brown Soup Thing, Takers, and Lonely Boy.

For a television pilot in 2010, Briones played one of three children of a single mother moonlighting as a drug kingpin in Beverly Hills.

In 2018, she appeared alongside her father in an episode of The Assassination of Gianni Versace: American Crime Story.

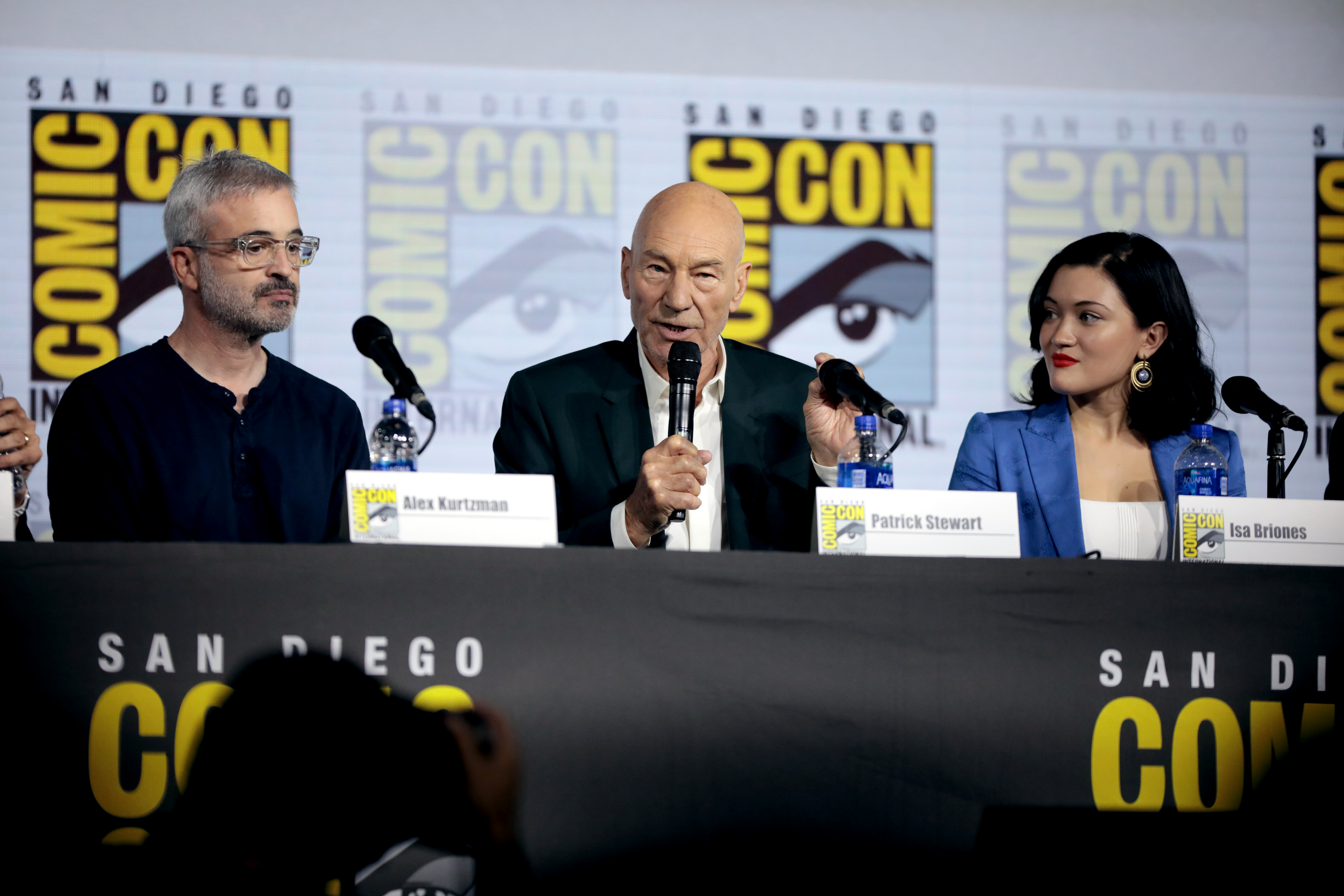
Alex Kurtzman, Patrick Stewart and Isa Briones at the 2019 San Diego Comic-Con

In 2019, Briones was cast in Star Trek: Picard as two sets of synthetic twins: Dahj and Soji, and Jana and Sutra. Briones sent tapes of herself to audition for the web television series while she was playing multiple roles on stage in Hamilton, and learned during the process that she would portray twins in the series. She made her debut as both Dahj and Soji during the season premiere in January 2020. Sutra is introduced in episode nine.

In his review of the series' debut episode, Entertainment Weekly's Darren Franich called its plot developments "shock tactics" and Dahj "vacant". Scott Collura of IGN wrote that Soji is effectively a plot device, but Briones "gives it her all week after week, reacting best she can to Soji's changing status quo". Keith DeCandido from Tor.com said her performance improved with each episode; "her confused post-activation Soji is her best work". Later, she portrayed Kore, a genetically engineered "daughter" of 21st century geneticist Adam Soong (Brent Spiner). In July 2020, Briones took part in the Star Trek Universe Virtual Panel for Comic-Con@Home, the virtual event that replaced San Diego Comic-Con in 2020. Briones did not return for the series' third season.

In October of 2022, Briones was added to the cast of the Disney+ series Goosebumps (2023), based on the novels by R. L. Stine. Briones played Margot, a bookworm thought by her high-school classmates to be a snob.

Briones joined the cast of the medical drama The Pitt in 2024 as Dr. Trinity Santos, a self-assured and abrasive intern. The Pitt became a major critical and ratings success upon its debut in April 2025. Santos's character was controversial among audiences for her role in interpersonal conflicts, although Briones herself said she enjoyed the role of a "complicated" character. She also cited the importance of the series' work in representing Filipino contributions to the American healthcare system, saying it had "never really been addressed before in this way. We haven't seen a lot of Filipino actors in medical shows before, and now we finally have that chance." As part of the series' primary cast, she received the award for Ensemble in a Drama Series at the 32nd Actor Awards.

=== Theatre ===
Briones has performed in numerous stage musicals since childhood. She played Susan in a Los Angeles production of Miracle on 34th Street, in which Megan Briones appeared as her mother.

Isa Briones singing as Natalie in Next to Normal

In 2018, Briones earned three Ovation Award nominations for Featured Actress In a Musical from the LA STAGE Alliance. She was nominated for her portrayal of Perón's mistress in Evita, and won for her performance in one of two discrete productions of Next to Normal. In his review of Next to Normal in August 2016, Cary Ginell of BroadwayWorld wrote, "Briones gives a disquietingly effective, achingly nuanced portrayal" of her character, Natalie; in October, Ginell called her song in Evita "one of the most quietly exquisite moments in the entire musical." Margaret Gray of the Los Angeles Times called Briones the "breakout star" of Next to Normal in May 2017: "Briones played the role before ... and she has a lock on it." Erin Conley of OnStage Los Angeles praised Briones's "beautiful, crystal clear voice."

Briones joined her father when he moved back to New York in January 2018. She was cast in Hamilton following a seven-month audition process, becoming at age 19 the youngest person to join the first national touring company. Over the course of its one-year run, she played both Peggy Schuyler and Maria Reynolds, and understudied for the role of Eliza Hamilton. Her performances brought praise from Judith Newmark of the St. Louis Post-Dispatch: she "effectively plays Peggy Schuyler as a cupcake and Maria Reynolds as a flambé." Cincinnati CityBeat's Rick Pender wrote, "Briones brings a sultry alto to her second role as Maria Reynolds," Hamilton's mistress. She toured with the company until March 2019, and was cast in Star Trek: Picard in April.

After production wrapped in Los Angeles on the series' first season, Briones returned to the stage. She appeared in AJ Rafael's Crazy Talented Asians, and #Hash(tag) America by Anthony Fedorov and Raye Zaragoza. In May 2020, Briones and the cast of Crazy Talented Asians began producing a monthly online performance series.

Briones returned to the stage in Los Angeles in April 2022 for a reading of Graves, a play written by Ellie Pyle and directed by Bola Ogun. In July, she joined the cast of Grease as staged by Musical Theatre West. Sean McMullen of The Press-Enterprise called her presence as Betty Rizzo "tough, seasoned, and visceral." Steven Stanley of Stage Scene LA wrote, "Briones gives Rizzo both power pipes and tough-girl swagger". In March 2024, Briones joined the cast of Hadestown on Broadway as Eurydice. Her father joined the cast as Hermes.

Briones played Connie Francis in the musical Just in Time in a limited run that began on April 1, 2026.

=== Music ===
Briones has recorded several video duets with fellow Filipino-American performer AJ Rafael. Their version of "Rewrite the Stars" from The Greatest Showman was released as a single.

"Blue Skies"
Isa Briones was asked by Star Trek: Picard co-creator Alex Kurtzman and composer Jeff Russo to sing "Blue Skies" for episode 10.

For the Star Trek: Picard season one finale, "Et In Arcadia Ego, Part 2", Irving Berlin's "Blue Skies" was set to play during Data's final scene as a bookend to his performance in Star Trek: Nemesis. Composer Jeff Russo wrote a new arrangement for the episode, and series co-creator Alex Kurtzman suggested they ask Briones to perform the vocals. Briones said, "it's so right that this is the song" playing at the end of Data's journey. Her rendition was released as a single in 2020.

== Personal life ==
As of 2020, Briones lived in Los Angeles.

She has two cats named Frog and Toad whom she adopted in 2024.

== Activism ==
In April 2020, Briones joined her Star Trek: Picard castmates, including Jonathan Frakes, Jeri Ryan and Brent Spiner, in a video message of hope to viewers affected by the COVID-19 pandemic.

In 2021, she participated in a video campaign addressing hate crimes against Asian Americans.

Upon being cast in The Pitt, Briones advocated for a change in her character's name to represent her Filipino heritage, reflecting the strong Filipino presence in the medical field. Her character delivers a line in Tagalog to two gossiping Filipina nurses in the first-season episode "5:00 P.M.", confirming their own suspicions about her Filipina ancestry.

== Acting credits ==
=== Film ===
Year	Title	Role	Notes
2008	Brown Soup Thing	Cousin Isa	
2010	Takers	Sunday Welles	
2013	Lonely Boy	Mia	
2016	Carpool	Carmen	Short film

=== Television ===
Year	Title	Role	Notes
2018	The Assassination of Gianni Versace: American Crime Story	Elena Cunanan	Episode: "Creator/Destroyer"; also starring Jon Jon Briones
2020	The Ready Room	Herself	Web television aftershow: "S1 E9"
2020–2022	Star Trek: Picard	Dahj/Soji/Jana/Sutra/Kore	14 episodes
2023	Goosebumps	Margot	Main role; Season 1 (10 episodes)
2025–present	The Pitt	Dr. Trinity Santos	Main role; 30 episodes

=== Theatre ===
Year	Production	Role	Venue	Notes
2016	Evita	Mistress/ensemble	Fred Kalvi Theatre, Cabrillo Music Theatre	August 14–23, 2016
2016–2017	Next to Normal	Natalie	Pico Playhouse, Los Angeles	August 19 – October 8, 2016
2016–2017	Next to Normal	Natalie	East West Players, David Henry Hwang Theatre, Los Angeles	May 11 – June 11, 2017
2018–2019	Hamilton	Peggy Schuyler/Maria Reynolds u/s Eliza Hamilton (replacement)	U.S. National Tour	March 2018 – March 2019
2022	Grease	Betty Rizzo	Richard and Karen Carpenter Performing Arts Center	July 8–24, 2022
2024	Hadestown	Eurydice (replacement)	Walter Kerr Theatre, Broadway	March 19 – June 30, 2024
2025	All Nighter	Lizzy (replacement)	The Newman Mills Theater, Off-Broadway	April 30 – May 18, 2025
2026	Just in Time	Connie Francis (replacement)	Circle in the Square Theatre, Broadway	April 1 — May 29, 2026

== Discography ==
Singles
Year	Title	Artist	Label
2018	"Rewrite the Stars"	AJ Rafael ft. Isa Briones	Atlantic
2020	"Blue Skies"	Isa Briones	Lakeshore
2026	"Who's Sorry Now"	Isa Briones	Atlantic
2026	"My First Real Love"	Isa Briones, Jeremy Jordan	Atlantic

=== Featured Recordings ===
- Murder at the Gates (2026) - Steven Sater, James Bourne

== Awards and nominations ==
Year	Award	Category	Nominated work	Result
2018	Ovation Awards	Featured Actress in a Musical	Evita	Nominated
2018	Ovation Awards	Featured Actress in a Musical	Next to Normal (East West Players)	Won
2018	Ovation Awards	Featured Actress in a Musical	Next to Normal (Triage Productions; Standing Room Only Productions)	Nominated
2026	Actor Awards	Outstanding Performance by an Ensemble in a Drama Series	The Pitt	Won
