= R. Scott Gemmill =

Canadian television writer and producer

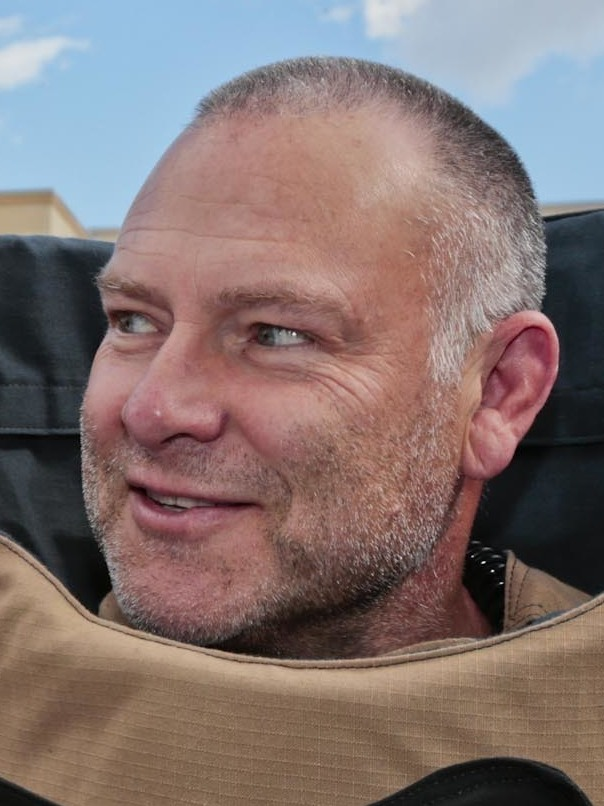
- Gemmill in 2015
- Born: 1963 or 1964 (age 62–63); Orangeville, Ontario, Canada
- Occupations: Television writer; producer
- Years active: 1989–present
- Notable work: The Pitt; NCIS: Los Angeles; NCIS: New York

R. Scott Gemmill (born 1963 or 1964) is a Canadian television writer and producer. He wrote and produced for JAG, ER, and NCIS: Los Angeles, serving as showrunner from its eighth season onward. Gemmill is also the creator, showrunner, and executive producer of the medical drama The Pitt, which won the Primetime Emmy Award for Outstanding Drama Series.

== Biography ==
Gemmill was born in Orangeville, Ontario, and raised in Fort Erie, Ontario. He started as a story editor on Friday the 13th: The Series in 1989 and also wrote for the show. He also wrote on Tropical Heat and Side Effects.

Gemmill worked on JAG as an executive story editor and writer. He joined the crew in the first season and remained until the fourth season, writing a total of 18 episodes. After two years of writing for the show, he became a producer. In 1999, he was nominated for a Humanitas Prize in the 60-minute category for his work on the JAG episode "Angels 30".

He joined the crew of ER in its sixth season as a supervising producer and writer, and eventually became an executive producer for the show. The show was twice nominated for an Emmy Award for Best Drama Series for the sixth and seventh seasons. He wrote for the series until the thirteenth season, a total of thirty-two episodes. In 2008, he and David Zabel won a Humanitas Prize in the drama teleplay category for their work on the ER season 12 episode "There Are No Angels Here".

He went on to work on the drama series Smith as an executive producer. After the cancellation of Smith, he worked as a writer and executive producer on Women's Murder Club. When that series was also cancelled, he took a position as a consulting producer and writer on The Unit. After that program ended, he became a writer and executive producer on the fall 2009 series NCIS: Los Angeles, and became its showrunner in its eighth season.

Gemmill is the creator and showrunner of the HBO Max medical drama The Pitt and also serves as a writer and executive producer. The show won the 2025 and 2026 Primetime Emmy Award for Outstanding Drama Series.

== Selected filmography ==
- Tropical Heat (1991–1993)
- JAG (1995–1999)
- ER (1999–2007)
- Women's Murder Club (2007–2008)
- NCIS: Los Angeles (2009–2023)
- The Pitt (2025–present)
- NCIS: New York (2026-present)
