= Antonio Marziale =

American actor (born 1993)

- Born: September 29, 1993 (age 32); London, UK
- Education: Carnegie Mellon University (BFA)
- Occupation: Actor
- Years active: 2013–present

Antonio Marziale (born September 28, 1993) is an American actor, best known for playing Elliot in the original Netflix movie Alex Strangelove. He also portrays the character of Benicio in Brian Jordan Alvarez's popular YouTube series, The Gay and Wondrous Life of Caleb Gallo.

== Life and career ==
Marziale was born in London, England. His father is Italian and his mother is from Toronto, Ontario, Canada. He attended The American School in Switzerland and attended Carnegie Mellon University when he was 16 years old.

In addition to his role in Alex Strangelove, in 2017 he starred as Daryn Boston in the 12th season episode "The Memory Remains" of the fantasy horror series Supernatural.

He plays Isaac Bancroft in Netflix's popular dystopic series Altered Carbon.

In 2022, Marziale made his debut as a director and screenwriter in short film Starfuckers, which premiered at the 2022 Sundance Film Festival.

== Filmography ==
Film and television credits
Year	Title	Role	Notes
2013	Robinson	Brian	Short film
2015, 2017	Project Mc^{2}	Prince Xander	Main role (Part 1); Recurring role (Part 4)
2016	The Gay and Wondrous Life of Caleb Gallo	Benicio	Main role
2017	Supernatural	Daryn Boston	Episode: "The Memory Remains"
2018	Altered Carbon	Isaac Bancroft	
2018	Alex Strangelove	Elliot	
2020	Fall to Fame	Will	Short film
2022	Starfuckers		Short film; Also as director and screenwriter
