= Jason Greene =

American actor (born 1988)

- Born: February 2, 1988 (age 38); Los Angeles, California, United States
- Education: Los Angeles County High School for the Arts
- Known for: Acting
- Notable work: The Gay and Wondrous Life of Caleb Gallo

Jason Greene (also known as Freckle or Aunt Freckle) is an American actor and internet personality. They are known for their role as Freckle in the YouTube web series The Gay and Wondrous Life of Caleb Gallo. Greene has also appeared in the television series Search Party and Everything Is Free.

== Early life and education ==
Greene grew up with several half-siblings and developed an interest in acting at a young age, performing scenes with their older sister. Greene played Jesus in a middle school production of The Last Supper.

At the age of 14, Greene was accepted into the Los Angeles County High School for the Arts, despite a lack of formal training.

Greene received the Emerging Young Artist Award, which included a scholarship from California. They used this scholarship to study at The Groundlings in the Meisner Technique and the Alexander Technique.

== Career ==
In 2010, Greene auditioned for American Idol, singing "I Touch Myself". A clip of the performance was used in a Super Bowl commercial and appeared on The Ellen DeGeneres Show. Greene was interviewed about their performance on Fox News.

Greene collaborated with Brian Jordan Alvarez, creating videos, including "What Actually Happens When Gay Guys See Other Gay Guys and Straight People Aren't Around" and "When Your Gender Fluid Friend Gets More Attention from Straight Guys Than You".

Greene's role in Alvarez's web series project, The Gay and Wondrous Life of Caleb Gallo, gained them internet popularity. They have since appeared in films, television, music videos and internet videos, occasionally playing trans characters. Greene also collaborated with the visual journalism site, Damn Joan, to host "Ask Aunt Freckle".

== Personal life ==
Greene identifies as genderfluid, describing their experience with gender as "meta". Having been raised by socially liberal parents, they said that they felt free to express their femininity, and aim to be a visible example of genderfluidity.

Greene previously used the pronoun "it", both reclaiming a derogatory term for trans people and referencing so-called "it girls".

Religiously, Greene has said that they connect with Buddhism, Zen and Taoism.

== Freckle ==
Greene conceived the Freckle persona as an act for clubs and shows. Their explanation for the name is that "a freckle in space is a star." Greene envisioned Freckle as a modern flapper with a gender role reversal: a boy with long hair wearing a skirt.

Freckle is featured in the web series The Gay and Wondrous Life of Caleb Gallo. Greene describes it as a "vaudeville, smoky chanteuse, courtesan-concubine, you know, mistress of the dark, Silver Lake lady-boy", inspired by their grandmother and her "boozy-floozy" personality. Greene also cites singers and actresses like Judy Garland, Bette Davis and Joan Crawford as inspirations.

Greene has used Freckle in charity calendars, to raise money for the Los Angeles LGBTQ Center.

== Filmography and videography ==
Films
Year	Title	Role
2016	Dealing With Dana	Guy on Street
2017	Anything	Evelyn
2017	Everything Is Free	Eli
2019	Bagdad, Florida	We'wha
2019	Wine Country	Freckle
2020	Cicada	Theresa

Television
Year	Title	Role
2010	American Idol	Self
2014	Complete Works	Giorgio
2016	The Gay and Wondrous Life of Caleb Gallo	Freckle
2017	Search Party	Julio

Video games
Year	Title	Role
2020	Fallout 76: Steel Dawn	Burke

Shorts
Year	Title	Role
2012	You Are What I Want	Mickey Tipps
2014	Belief	
2015	When Your Gender Fluid Friend Gets More Attention from Straight Guys Than You	Freckle
2016	Call Your Father	Brunette

Music videos
Year	Title	Role
2017	Grizzly Bear, "Losing All Sense"	
