= Brian Jordan Alvarez =

American actor and filmmaker (born 1987)

- Born: July 9, 1987 (age 39); New York City, U.S.
- Education: University of Southern California (BFA)
- Occupations: Actor; comedian; writer; producer; director
- Years active: 2009–present
- Known for: Will and Grace; Jane the Virgin; English Teacher

Brian Jordan Alvarez (born July 9, 1987) is an American actor, comedian, and filmmaker. He is best known for creating and starring in the FX comedy series English Teacher. He is also known for his original songs, recurring roles as Estéfan in Will & Grace (2018–2020) and Wesley in Jane the Virgin (2015–2016), appearances in such films as M3GAN and 80 for Brady, and his own self-produced films and series, most notably his 2016 web series The Gay and Wondrous Life of Caleb Gallo.

== Early life ==
Alvarez was born in Manhattan, New York City to Paul Jordan and Angela Jordan Alvarez, an electrical engineer and Spanish language professor, respectively. He has a sister, Catalina. He is of Colombian descent matrilineally and has roots from the American South from the other side of his family. He speaks Spanish and English fluently.

He spent his childhood in Winchester, Tennessee, where he began acting and making movies. He went on to attend Saint Andrew's Sewanee School and then the high school program at the University of North Carolina School of the Arts in Winston-Salem, North Carolina. Heavily involved in his school's theater program, he continued to study acting at the USC School of Dramatic Arts. He graduated in 2009 with a Bachelor of Fine Arts in Acting and settled in Los Angeles the following year.

== Career ==
=== YouTube ===
In 2012, Alvarez collaborated with CollegeHumor on an episode titled "Gay Men Will Marry Your Girlfriends". In 2016, Alvarez wrote, produced, directed and starred in the five-part web comedy series The Gay and Wondrous Life of Caleb Gallo. The series played at the 2016 Tribeca Film Festival as part of its New Online Work. The series was nominated for the Gotham Award for Breakthrough Series – Shortform and was named Indiewire's number-one web series for the year.

=== Early television roles ===
He has performed roles in several television shows including: Will & Grace, Life in Pieces, Jane the Virgin, and Go-Go Boy Interrupted. In October 2014, he was cast in a supporting role in the MTV scripted comedy pilot Self Promotion. The show, directed by Zach Braff, was ultimately not picked up by the network.

On April 22, 2015, Alvarez co-starred on season 6, episode 18 of Hot in Cleveland titled "Cleveland Calendar Girls". He played the photographer who took engagement photos for Joy (played by Jane Leeves) and nude photos for Elka (played by Betty White) and her friends as they put together a nude calendar of elderly women to raise money for the Cleveland Animal Shelter.

On October 17, 2016, Alvarez was on season 6, episode 3 of 2 Broke Girls titled "That '80s Movie" directed by Fred Savage. Alvarez played Tad, one half of a gay couple Caroline (played by Beth Behrs) called her "hot gay guys" that she was trying to use to lure cool clientele into her new bar.

From 2018 to 2020, Alvarez played the recurring role of Estéfan Gloria, Jack McFarland's fiancé and later husband, in all three seasons of the 2010s revival of NBC's Will & Grace.

In August 2020, it was announced Alvarez was cast in the Netflix quarantine anthology series Social Distance. He appeared in the episode "Zero Feet Away" opposite Max Jenkins. Alvarez has also made appearances on Australian television due to his ability to do a convincing Australian accent.

=== Social media ===
Alvarez has gained prominence for his viral videos on Instagram and TikTok, in which he often portrays a rotating cast of absurdist characters using thick accents and distorting facial filters. In September 2023, he posted a video featuring his character TJ Mack performing an improvised song titled "Sitting", which quickly became an online sensation, accumulating millions of views and being remixed and covered by fans in various genres. Versions of "Sitting" have appeared on the radio in both the United States and Australia, and Vanity Fair has described it as possibly 2023's "song of the summer".

In November 2024, he went viral for daily shirtless dancing videos promoting his show English Teacher. He dances to a trending audio clip from "Teach Me Tonight," episode 19 of season two of Gilmore Girls. In the audio, the character Kurt says, "I love your daughter," and when his father responds, "What do you have to offer her?" Kurt replies, "Nothing, only this," and then music starts. Sometimes Alvarez takes off articles of clothing while dancing, with one journalist making a compilation of twenty-two different shirtless videos of Alvarez doing that trend that went viral.

Alvarez has a signature move of lifting one leg at some point during each dancing video. He initially started posting the videos because he wanted to drum up more buzz and viewership for English Teacher, and after posting show clips, reviews, and the more traditional posts to get the word out, without any of them seeing much traction, he tried the dancing angle saying, "Desperation is a powerful thing."

=== English Teacher ===
Around 2021, Alvarez said that he was retiring from writing and producing to focus on acting, but Paul Simms, now one of the executive producers of English Teacher, convinced Alvarez otherwise. Simms had been impressed after watching old episodes of The Gay and Wondrous Life of Caleb Gallo and asked Alvarez to create a TV show. Alvarez said of their meeting that he told Simms "'I tried to make TV shows in the system; I don't know how to get through the notes process,' and Paul said, 'I'm going to be your guide, you're coming out of retirement, we're making a TV show.' This is what you want in your life, this divine voice to float down from heaven and say, 'You can do it, I believe in you.'"

When coming up with the idea for English Teacher, Alvarez leaned on inspiration from his family, as his mom and sister are both teachers. Having grown up a blue dot in a red state (Tennessee), he thought setting the show in the suburbs of Austin, Texas would be fertile ground for having all types of characters and opinions, saying: "There's no set of opinions you can really avoid in a public high school, so I knew all of that in one place could make for good comedy."

In November 2023, it was announced that FX had ordered Alvarez's 2022 English Teacher comedy pilot to series. Alvarez created the series and stars as the protagonist, an English teacher working at a high school in Austin, Texas. He is also a writer, director, and producer on the show.

In September 2024, the first season of English Teacher premiered to critical acclaim. The New York Times called it one of "Best TV Shows of 2024." Entertainment Weekly gave the show an "A+ grade."

On February 7, 2025, FX renewed English Teacher for a second season. This decision drew criticism in light of the multiple allegations of sexual assault against Alvarez that had recently come to light. In November 2025, the series was cancelled.

In 2025, Alvarez played on Celebrity Jeopardy! against Roy Wood Jr. and Phoebe Robinson. Alvarez played for the charity Communities in Schools and won $30,000 on their behalf, coming in second to Roy Wood Jr.

== Personal life ==
When speaking of how The Gay and Wondrous Life of Caleb Gallo relates to his experience as a gay man in Los Angeles, Alvarez said, "It's pretty easy to be queer in the city. The show can look like a gay utopia maybe because I kind of live in a queer utopia."

He almost did not graduate from college due to alcohol and drug use and got sober because "he was scared not knowing if he was going to be as successful as he knew he wanted to be".

=== Allegations of sexual assault ===
While a student at the University of Southern California, Alvarez allegedly stalked a female friend's boyfriend who later filed a no-contact order against him. Another student alleged that Alvarez groped him without consent, saying, "It got to the point where I was so uncomfortable I didn't want to be in the same room with him".

In August 2024, Alvarez's The Gay and Wondrous Life of Caleb Gallo co-star Jon Ebeling, who played Billy in the series, posted an Instagram Story alluding to having been sexually assaulted by Alvarez, comparing his experiences working with him to the plot of the Netflix series Baby Reindeer. The following month, the day before English Teacher's premiere, Ebeling filed a sexual assault report against Alvarez with the Los Angeles Police Department for the 2016 incident, which Vulture covered in a December 2024 story. Ebeling alleged that Alvarez sexually assaulted Ebeling by performing nonconsensual oral sex on him during the shooting of a 2016 episode. Alvarez denied the story through a spokesperson alleging that "all interactions with Ebeling were always entirely consensual" and that he believed the 2016 incident to be consensual because of their prior sexual history.

== Filmography ==
=== Television ===
Year	Title	Role	Notes
2015	Hot in Cleveland	Ian	Episode: "Cleveland Calendar Girls"
2015	Life in Pieces	Jorge	Episode: "Interruptus Date Breast Movin'"
2015	RocketJump: The Show	Sherlock	Episode: "Fan Friction"
2015	Self Promotion	Wyatt	TV pilot
2015–2016	Jane the Virgin	Wesley Masters	4 episodes
2016	Gay Skit Happens	Various characters	2 episodes; Logo TV sketch comedy show
2016	2 Broke Girls	Tad	Episode: "And the 80's Movie"
2016	The Great Indoors	Brian	Episode: "No Bad Ideas"
2017–2019	Get Shorty	Jayson / Robert	9 episodes
2018	Grace and Frankie	Willy	Episode: "The Rats"
2018–2020	Will & Grace	Estéfan Gloria	13 episodes
2019	Special	Shay	Episode: "Chapter Three: Free Scones"
2019	Grand Hotel	Topher	Episode: "Long Night's Journey Into Day"
2019	Black Jesus	Phil Osterfawk	Episode: "The Real Jesus of Compton"
2020	Corporate	Bonan Marrow	Episode: "The Wind of God"
2020	Social Distance	Marco	Episode: "Zero Feet Away"
2023	Ten Year Old Tom	(voice)	Episode: "Sweet Home Cancún"
2023	Praise Petey	Emmett (voice)	10 episodes
2024	Grimsburg	(voice)	Episode: "The Flute-itive"
2024	Hailey's On It!	David (voice)	Episode: "Get Whale Soon"
2024–2025	English Teacher	Evan Marquez	18 episodes; also creator, writer, executive producer, and director
2025	StuGo	Van (voice)	Episode: "Moon Moon"

=== Films ===
Year	Title	Role	Functioned as			Notes
Year	Title	Role	Director	Screenwriter	Producer	Notes
2008	Ted White-Knockelby Pursues the American Dream	—	Yes			Short film
2009	In The Dark	Alex Emerson				Short film
2009	Herpes Boy	DragonSlayer1985				
2010	Consent	Seth				
2011	Come Visit	—	Yes	Yes	Yes	Short film
2014	The Setup	Elliot				
2014	Wave	Tim	Yes			Short film
2016	The Operator	Allen (voice)				Short film
2016	Paco	Paco				Short film
2016	The Happys	Patrick				
2016	Going Together	Griffin				Short film
2017	Everything is Free	Ivan	Yes	Yes	Yes	Also composer and editor; distributed in 2019
2017	How to Be a Slut in America	Brian	Yes	Yes	Yes	Also editor; released in three parts
2018	Grandmother's Gold	Danny	Yes	Yes	Yes	Also composer and editor
2018	Are You Still Singing?	Office Manager				Short film
2018	Stuck	Raymond				
2019	Web Series: The Movie	Dave Stdert	Yes	Yes	Yes	Also editor
2019	Simply Having	Remly LaMore			Yes	Short film
2021	A Spy Movie	Jack Johnson			Yes	Short film. Producer and actor.
2022	M3GAN	Cole				
2023	80 for Brady	Derek				
2025	M3GAN 2.0	Cole				
2026	Stop! That! Train!	Cal				

=== Web series and shorts ===
Selected credits

Year	Title	Role	Producer	Notes
2012	Gay Men Will Marry Your Girlfriends	Garden Guy	CollegeHumor Originals	Short
2012	Charlie's Gayngels	Charlie	Brian Jordan Alvarez	Short
2012	You Are What I Want	Nelson Adams	Brian Jordan Alvarez	Short
2014	It's Just a Question	Frank	Brian Jordan Alvarez	Short
2014	For Auld Lang Syne	Matt	Brian Jordan Alvarez	Short
2014–2016	Go-Go Boy Interrupted	Eliot	Jimmy Fowlie	8 episodes
2015	Ryan Gosling Responds to Haters	Zac Efron	Brian Jordan Alvarez	Short
2016	Unreleased Robert Durst Third Interview	Andrew Jarecki	Brian Jordan Alvarez	Short
2016	The Gay and Wondrous Life of Caleb Gallo	Caleb	Brian Jordan Alvarez	5 episodes; also director, writer, producer, and editor
2016	Neonate Fest	Shane Lucas	Funny or Die	Episode: "Vape Battle of the Century"
2016	JoJoHead		CW Seed	Episode: "Seemed Like a Good Idea at the Time"
2016	Made in China	Emil	Ken Kirby	Web series pilot
2017	Catching a Break	Ray		Episode: "All Day Adventure"
2017	Stupid Idiots	Brian	Stephanie Koenig	Miniseries; 6 episodes
2019	Lovelytheband: "Maybe, I'm Afraid"	Brian		Music video
2019	Matt and Dan	Bartholemew	Matt & Dan	Episode: "Deal Breaker" web series
2019	Stellar People	Antares		Unreleased web series
2022	Superorganism: "Teenager"	Dancer	Verdigris Management	Music video

== Awards and nominations ==
Organization	Year	Category	Nominated work	Result	Ref.
Gotham Awards	2016	Breakthrough Series – Short Form	The Gay and Wondrous Life of Caleb Gallo	Nominated	
Independent Spirit Awards	2025	Best New Scripted Series	English Teacher	Nominated	
Independent Spirit Awards	2025	Best Lead Performance in a New Scripted Series	English Teacher	Nominated	
