= Audrey Moore =

Audrey Moore may refer to:

- Audrey Moore (politician) (born 1928), politician from Fairfax County, Virginia
- Audrey Moore (swimmer) (born 1964), Australian swimmer
- Audrey Moore (actress), American actress
