= The Gay and Wondrous Life of Caleb Gallo =

2016 American comedy web series

- Created by: Brian Jordan Alvarez
- Written by: Brian Jordan Alvarez
- Directed by: Brian Jordan Alvarez
- Starring: Brian Jordan Alvarez; Stephanie Koenig; Jon Ebeling; Antonio Marziale; Ken Kirby; Jason Greene
- Country of origin: United States
- Original language: English
- No. of seasons: 1
- No. of episodes: 5

Production
- Executive producer: Justin Berns
- Editor: Brian Jordan Alvarez

Original release
- Release: January 4 – September 2, 2016

The Gay and Wondrous Life of Caleb Gallo is an American comedy web series created, written, directed by and starring Brian Jordan Alvarez, who plays Caleb Gallo, and executive produced by Justin Berns. The series features actors Stephanie Koenig, Jon Ebeling, Antonio Marziale, Ken Kirby, and Jason Greene. The series ran for five episodes on YouTube from January 4 to September 2, 2016. The series explores LGBTQ themes, featuring genderfluid and gay characters. The show's style has been described as absurdist and surreal. As Jude Dry of IndieWire describes, "Brian Jordan Alvarez uses the traditional sitcom as a foundation to imagine a world a few marbles short of reality." Steven Horowitz of Paper notes that while the series "may stretch beyond the limits of reality, it's actually deeply rooted in it."

== Production ==
The Gay and Wondrous Life of Caleb Gallo was funded without a production company, but by an investor. The $10,000 received was split between the first three episodes. Instead of being produced on a schedule, the webseries was made at its own pace. Creator Brian Jordan Alvarez served multiple roles while making the show, including actor, director, producer, writer, and editor. As he explains, "Essentially, I love doing everything myself, so as the production grows, it's a process finding people who I trust to take on parts of the workload that I am no longer capable of doing."

== LGBTQ representation ==
The Gay and Wondrous Life of Caleb Gallo includes many LGBTQ+ characters and topics, including nonbinary characters. According to cast member Antonio Marziale, the show's representation is unique in that "[i]t doesn't have to be this big thing." As Jude Dry of IndieWire explains, "Dates are walks, siblings are different races, gender is whatever, and sexual preference is something to be tried on like a fabulous hat."

== Cast and characters ==
=== Main ===
- Brian Jordan Alvarez as Caleb
- Stephanie Koenig as Karen
- Jon Ebeling as Billy
- Ken Kirby as Lenjamin
- Antonio Marziale as Benicio
- Jason Greene as Freckle

=== Guest ===
- Jimmy Fowlie as Chris (episode 1)
- Michael Strassner as Mike Wake (episode 2, 5)
- Judilin Bosita as Jury (advisor) (episode 2, 5)
- Punam Patel as Panana (advisor) (episode 2, 5)
- Danièle Watts as Tatiana (episode 4, 5)
- Curtis Tyrone Scott as Jarius (episode 4)
- Brian Sounalath as Johnny (episode 4)
- Satya Bhabha as Andy (episode 4)
- Toby Abatemarco as Juan (episode 5)
- Loretta Fox as Andrea (episode 5)
- Nick Jandl as Malcolm (episode 5)
- Matthew Lynn as Jeff (episode 5)
- Austin Dale as Cousin Marlon (episode 5)

== Controversy ==
In August 2024, Alvarez's co-star Jon Ebeling, who played Billy in the series, posted an Instagram Story alluding to having been sexually assaulted by Alvarez, comparing his experiences working with him to the plot of the Netflix series Baby Reindeer. Ebeling filed a sexual assault report against Alvarez with the Los Angeles Police Department the following month. A story published by Vulture in December 2024 alleged that Alvarez sexually assaulted Ebeling by performing nonconsensual oral sex on him during the shooting of a 2016 episode. Alvarez denied the story through a spokesperson alleging that "all interactions with Ebeling were always entirely consensual" and that he believed the 2016 incident to be consensual because of their prior sexual history.
