= Stephanie Koenig =

American actress and producer

- Born: September 1, 1987 (age 39)
- Education: Michigan State University
- Occupations: Actress; producer
- Years active: 2008–present
- Spouse: Chris Riggi (m. 2022)
- Children: 1

Stephanie Koenig (born September 1, 1987) is an American actress and producer. She is best known for her roles as Karen in The Gay and Wondrous Life of Caleb Gallo, Sabrina Oznowich in The Flight Attendant, Fran Frask in Lessons in Chemistry, Gwen in English Teacher, and Cassie in Scrubs.

Koenig is an alumna of Michigan State University.

== Career ==
In 2012, Koenig participated as the feminine singer on a number of songs from the album Hawaii: Part II, part of the project Miracle Musical.

In 2016, Koenig created the comedy web series, Stupid Idiots, which she wrote, directed, and stars in as Stephanie. In July 2017, Paramount Television and Anonymous Content acquired the rights to the web series. In 2016, Koenig starred in the LGBT themed comedy web series The Gay and Wondrous Life of Caleb Gallo created by frequent collaborator Brian Jordan Alvarez, playing the character Karen.

In July 2019, Koenig joined the comedy film Sick Girl as Cece, which was released in October 2023. In September 2020, Koenig joined the cast of the CBS comedy, Wilde Things as Mary Wolfe, written and created by Max Mutchnick and David Kohan. CBS passed on the series in 2021. In July 2020, Koenig joined the cast of the biographical-drama miniseries, The Offer, which premiered in April 2022. In October 2021, Koenig announced that she wrote, directed, and stars in the satire film A Spy Movie, playing the role Bushilla Strasshola. The film was released online on December 10, 2021.

== Filmography ==
=== Film ===
Year	Title	Role	Notes
2012	Home Run Showdown	Aunt Janey Moore	
2013	Highland Park	Eileen	
2014	Goodbye for Now	Meredith Maxwell	Short film
2014	Into the Storm	Marcia	
2014	Burying the Ex	Kendra	
2014	Once Upon a Zipper	Edie Bennett	Short film
2014	For Auld Lang Syne	Amy	Short film
2014	Down with David	Liz	
2015	Dial a Prayer	Jenn	
2016	Batman v Superman: Dawn of Justice	Teacher	
2016	Made in China	Stacey	Short film
2016	Miss Suzy Norman	Megan	Short film
2017	Everything Is Free	Stephanie	
2017	How to Be a Slut in America		
2018	The Reason Nobody Likes You	Adrian	Short film
2018	Curtis: Single Gay Friend	Steph	Short film
2018	Grandmother's Gold	Madeline	
2019	Web Series: The Movie	Rebecca Djigstadt	Also writer, director, and producer
2019	Simply Having	Jacqueline Rode	Short film
2020	Adam	Brandy	
2020	Good Luck with Everything	Noelle	
2021	A Spy Movie	Bushilla Strasshola	Also writer, director, editor and producer
2023	Sick Girl	Cece	
TBA	Famous		Filming

=== Television ===
Year	Title	Role	Notes
2008	Tally Hall's Internet Show	Dancer #3	Episode: "Potato Vs. Spoon"
2011	Late Night with Jimmy Fallon	Password Competitor	Episode: "January 19, 2011"
2011	Nick Swardson's Pretend Time	Ellen	Episode: "PETA Not on Set"
2014	Mixology	Red-Headed Friend	Episode: "Jessica & Ron"
2014	The 4 to 9ers: The Day Crew	Samantha	Main role
2014	Down with David	Liz	Main role
2014	Necrolectric	Eve	Main role
2014	Selfie	Bethany	Episode: "Stick in the Mud"
2015	About a Boy	Redhead	Episode: "About a Cat Party"
2015	NCIS	Lauren Hudson	Episode: "Incognito"
2016	The Gay and Wondrous Life of Caleb Gallo	Karen	Main role
2017	Stupid Idiots	Stephanie	Main role; also writer and director
2017	Jane the Virgin	Host	Episode: "Chapter Fifty-Two"
2017–18	Swedish Dicks	Eve	Recurring role: Season 2
2019	Johnno and Michael Try	Ghost Girlfriend	Episode: "Johnno and Michael Try a Sleepover"
2019	Second Chances	Gail Henderson	Episode: "Jason Nash Confronts His Internet Bully"
2019	Modern Family	Sheryl	Episode: "Perfect Pairs"
2020	The Flight Attendant	Sabrina Oznowich	Recurring role: Season 1
2022	The Offer	Andrea Eastman	Recurring role
2023	Lessons in Chemistry	Fran Frask	Main role
2024–25	English Teacher	Gwen Sanders	Main role; also writer
2026	Running Point	Lizzy Gordon	Episode: "Rehearsal Dinner"
2026	Scrubs	Cassie	Episode: "My Halloween"
