= Jazmin Grace Grimaldi =

American philanthropist, actress, and singer, child of Albert II, Prince of Monaco

- Born: March 4, 1992 (age 34); Palm Springs, California, U.S.
- Education: Fordham University (2014)
- Occupations: Actress; singer; philanthropist
- Parents: Albert II, Prince of Monaco; Tamara Jean Rotolo
- Relatives: Alexandre Grimaldi-Coste (half-brother); Princess Gabriella (half-sister); Hereditary Prince Jacques (half-brother); Grace Kelly (grandmother)
- Website: www.jazmingracegrimaldi.com

Jazmin Grace Grimaldi (French pronunciation: [ʒazmɛ̃ ɡʁɑs ɡʁimaldi] born March 4, 1992) is an American actress and singer who is the daughter of Prince Albert II of Monaco and Tamara Jean Rotolo.

Albert publicly confirmed Grimaldi's paternity on June 1, 2006, claiming that he had wanted to protect her identity until she was an adult. Grimaldi is the older half-sister of Hereditary Prince Jacques and Princess Gabriella of Monaco. She is also the older half-sister of Alexandre Grimaldi-Coste. As Grimaldi's parents never married, she is not in the line of succession to the Monegasque throne.

== Early life ==
Grimaldi was born in Palm Springs, California, in the United States on March 4, 1992. Her mother Tamara Jean Rotolo was a waitress at the time she met Prince Albert of Monaco. Grimaldi was born when her mother's divorce proceedings to David Schumacher were not yet finalized. She did not meet her father until her visit to Monaco at the age of 11.

During her youth, she was active in her middle school's basketball team and often performed in church choirs and school plays. When she was young, her mother would often show her photographs of her grandmother, Grace Kelly, and watch the Kelly film High Society.

Grimaldi grew up in Palm Desert, California and Orange County. She was educated at St. Margaret's Episcopal School where she graduated in 2006 and a Catholic high school, JSerra High School, from where she graduated in June 2010. She was an honor student and a soloist in a school choir that performed with singer Barry Manilow. Upon graduation, she received the JSerra Senior Faculty Award and the Fine Arts Award. She was also selected to be a lifetime member of the California Scholarship Federation, and has been since she was a sophomore, entitling her to the distinction of Sealbearer.

After graduating from JSerra, she attended Fordham University where she studied theater and international business with an emphasis on humanitarian affairs.

== Activities and career ==
Grimaldi has talked publicly about her grandmother Princess Grace, her father, her siblings and life in Monaco.

=== Acting ===
Grimaldi was cast in the third season of the Amazon Prime series The Marvelous Mrs. Maisel. Grimaldi has appeared in several films including Cicada.

=== Music ===
On December 19, 2019, she released her second single titled "Thankful", a collaboration with Ian Mellencamp.

=== Charity work ===
In November 2006, Grimaldi visited eight islands in Fiji on a humanitarian mission to help bring the local children assistance in education, medicine, and community development. Grimaldi later founded an organization called The Jazmin Fund to help children in remote villages in Fiji.

Grimaldi advocates for women's empowerment and is part of American fashion designer Tory Burch's campaign Embrace Ambition, which is aimed at providing funds, education and resources to female entrepreneurs.

== Succession issues ==
Children born out of wedlock are not in the line of succession to the Monegasque throne according to Article 10 of the Constitution of 2002 of the principality, which specifies that only "direct and legitimate" descendants of Monaco's monarch or the monarch's siblings and their descendants may inherit the throne.

In 2006, Albert II told US television personality Larry King that while his two eldest children were not in line for the Monegasque throne, they would be taken care of financially. They also stand to inherit a part of Prince Albert's personal fortune, estimated at more than one billion dollars.
