= So Long Boulder City =

2017 play

- Written by: Jimmy Fowlie; Jordan Black
- Based on: Unseen one-woman show from La La Land
- Characters: Mia Dolan
- Genre: Comedy, satire

Premiere
- Date: July 21, 2017
- Place: Celebration Theatre, Los Angeles
- Directed by: Jordan Black

So Long Boulder City is a one-woman play originally performed by Jimmy Fowlie and directed by Jordan Black. It ran at the Celebration Theatre in Los Angeles between July 21 and September 3, 2017 and at the Off-Broadway Subculture Theatre in New York City from December 7, 2017 to January 7, 2018. Co-written by Fowlie and Black, the play is a comedic spoof of the unseen one-woman show Mia Dolan writes and performs in the movie La La Land, and features Fowlie in drag as Mia.

Fowlie first publicly floated writing So Long Boulder City in April 2017. Fowlie and Black, both fans of La La Land, stated that they originally intended to do the show only once as a joke. However, the show sold out its first four performances in Los Angeles within 72 hours.

== Plot ==
Mia Dolan tells the audience about her life, starting with her childhood in Boulder City, Nevada, and how she was inspired to become an actress by her Aunt Genevieve (who in fact was not an actress, and just had schizophrenia). She then discusses her time as a failing theater student at Boise State University, from which she dropped out, and her attempts to pursue an acting career in Los Angeles. The play ends with Mia inviting her boyfriend Sebastian on stage to dance the Electric Slide with her, and Sebastian not showing. Mia then performs their joint dance routine by herself, and "skips" the last 90 minutes of the play where she had planned to ask Sebastian questions about their relationship.

== Reception ==
Annie Lloyd of LAist called the play "hilarious", praising both Fowlie's physical comedy and the play's capturing of the "vapidity and simplicity of Mia's La La Land persona". Peter Debruge of Variety also complemented the play as a "spot-on parody of LA solipsism".

Alexis Soloski of The New York Times wrote that "the satire was scattershot, the zingers not so zingy", and that Fowlie "seemed too convinced of his own funniness", but that the show had nonetheless gotten many laughs out of the audience. Time Out magazine gave the show three stars, noting it was "an amusing portrait of basic-girl enthusiasm and self-delusion", but that "as both satire and character study, it's pretty slender stuff".
