= Alex Strangelove =

2018 American romantic comedy film

- Release poster
- Directed by: Craig Johnson
- Written by: Craig Johnson
- Produced by: Jared Goldman; Ben Stiller; Nicholas Weinstock
- Starring: Daniel Doheny; Antonio Marziale; Madeline Weinstein; Joanna Adler; William Ragsdale; Daniel Zolghadri
- Cinematography: Hillary Spera
- Edited by: Jennifer Lee
- Music by: Nathan Larson
- Production companies: STXfilms; Red Hour Films; Mighty Engine
- Distributed by: Netflix
- Release dates: April 14, 2018 (SFF); June 8, 2018 (United States)
- Running time: 99 minutes
- Country: United States
- Language: English

Alex Strangelove is a 2018 American romantic comedy film written and directed by Craig Johnson and starring Daniel Doheny, Antonio Marziale, and Madeline Weinstein.

The film had its world premiere at the San Francisco International Film Festival on April 14, 2018. It was released on Netflix on June 8, 2018.

== Plot ==
High school student Alex Truelove has been friends with Claire since freshman year. They host a popular web series about animals and plan to attend Columbia University together. In senior year, after discovering her mother has cancer and is frequently in the hospital, she and Alex share a moment where Alex comforts her. They kiss and then begin dating. Eight months into their relationship, Alex is embarrassed in front of his friends as he is still a virgin. He is also nervous as Claire has had sex before. He and Claire make a plan to book a hotel room to have sex for the first time.

At a party, Alex meets Elliot, an openly gay teenager. Alex's continued interactions with Elliot, who has an obvious crush on Alex, lead him to question his sexuality. Alex confesses to his friend Dell that he believes he might be bisexual, but Dell says that he is just nervous about losing his virginity to Claire and his anxiety has led him to a false conclusion. One day while hanging out in Elliot's bedroom, Alex kisses him, but immediately regrets it and leaves.

During the evening of their first time having sex, Alex blurts out to Claire that he has feelings for someone else and she throws him out. Later, still avoiding Elliot, Alex goes to a party where he drunkenly sleeps with a girl he only just met. Claire catches them, and Alex chases after her when she storms out. He falls into a swimming pool on the way, where repressed memories of him being harassed by homophobic bullies come back to him. Claire finds him by the pool, where he confesses to her that he is gay. They decide to go to prom together anyway.

At prom, Claire reveals she has invited Elliot to be Alex's actual date, knowing that neither of them would make a move on each other without her "passing the baton". While Alex is initially concerned about everyone watching him, he decides that his affection for Elliot is stronger and kisses him in the middle of the dance floor. Later, Alex creates a video for his web series with Claire detailing his coming out.

== Cast ==
- Daniel Doheny as Alex Truelove
- Antonio Marziale as Elliot
- Madeline Weinstein as Claire
- Daniel Zolghadri as Dell
- Nik Dodani as Blake
- Fred Hechinger as Josh
- Annie Q. as Sophie Hicks
- Ayden Mayeri as Hilary
- Kathryn Erbe as Helen
- Joanna P. Adler as Holly Truelove
- William Ragsdale as Ron Truelove
- Isabella Amara as Gretchen
- Sophie Faulkenberry as Sierra
- Dante Costabile as Dakota
- Isley Reust as Isley
- Jesse James Keitel as Sidney

== Production ==
In May 2016, it was announced Craig Johnson would write and direct the film, with Jared Goldman, Ben Stiller and Nicholas Weinstock producing the film, under their Red Hour Films banner. STX Entertainment would distribute the film. In April 2017, Netflix acquired the film, with STX Entertainment still producing the film. That same month, Daniel Doheny joined the cast of the film. In June 2017, Nik Dodani and Antonio Marziale joined the cast of the film.

=== Filming ===
Principal photography began in May 2017.

== Release ==
The film had its world premiere at the San Francisco International Film Festival on April 14, 2018. It was released on June 8, 2018, on Netflix.

== Reception ==
On Rotten Tomatoes, the film has an approval rating of 84% based on 25 reviews, and an average rating of 6.1/10. The website's critical consensus reads, "Alex Strangelove offers a refreshingly insightful – and fittingly adult – take on teen sexuality enlivened by smart humor and a fearlessly progressive approach." On Metacritic, the film has a weighted average score of 62 out of 100, based on 10 critics, indicating "generally favorable" reviews.
