= Cicada (2020 film) =

American romantic drama film

- Film poster
- Directed by: Matthew Fifer and Kieran Mulcare
- Produced by: Jeremy Truong; Ramfis Myrthil
- Starring: Matthew Fifer; Sheldon Brown; Sandra Bauleo; Jazmin Grimaldi; Cobie Smulders; Scott Adsit; Michael Potts; David Burtka; Jo Firestone; Jason "Freckle" Greene
- Cinematography: Eric Schleicher
- Edited by: Kyle Sims; Matthew Fifer
- Music by: Gil Talmi
- Production company: rubbertape
- Distributed by: Strand Releasing
- Release dates: August 20, 2020 (Outfest Film Festival); October 29, 2021 (Quad Cinema)
- Running time: 93 minutes
- Country: United States
- Language: English
- Box office: $13,370

Cicada is a 2020 American romantic drama film directed by Matthew Fifer and Kieran Mulcare. Fifer co-wrote the film with Sheldon D. Brown, both of whom starred in leading roles.

After its original premiere was canceled due to the COVID-19 pandemic, the film played at Outfest Film Festival on August 22, 2020, with the European premiere at the 64th BFI London Film Festival. It received a limited theatrical from Strand Releasing in the United States starting October 29, 2021. The film was subsequently nominated for an Independent Spirit Award for Best First Screenplay.

== Synopsis ==
Ben spends his days living in Brooklyn and taking on a series of odd jobs, while at night he has meaningless one-night stands that leave him feeling empty inside. He suffers from hypochondria and has a set routine that he frequently goes through with his physician, Dr. Dragone. Ben's life takes on new meaning when he meets Sam, a data analyst, while browsing for books.

Over time, the two men each admit personal secrets that they had never really told to anyone else before. Ben comes forward about his childhood sexual abuse, while Sam admits that he has post traumatic stress disorder from being shot and also has not come out yet to his extremely religious father. As the two grow closer still, they soon realize that each must come to terms with their traumas if the relationship is to survive.

== Cast ==
- Matt Fifer as Ben
- Sheldon D. Brown as Sam
- Sandra Bauleo as Debbie
- Jazmin Grace Grimaldi as Amber
- Cobie Smulders as Sophie
- Scott Adsit as Dr. Dragone
- Michael Potts as Francis
- David Burtka as Bo
- Jo Firestone as Tracy
- Jason Greene as Theresa
- Ayo Edebiri as Nikki

== Production ==
Fifer wrote the script based upon his own life experiences. Cicada was developed with the support of Tribeca's TFI Network, and was produced by Ramfis Myrthil of Beast of the East Productions and Jeremey Truong.

== Release ==
The film was meant to premiere at the BFI Flare: London LGBTIQ+ Film Festival in March 2020, but the event was canceled due to the COVID-19 pandemic. It instead premiered at the Outfest Film Festival on August 20, 2020, being made available for streaming on Vimeo until August 23. It was also screened at the Outfest Drive-In at the Calamigos Ranch in Malibu on August 22.

The film was released in select theatres in the United States by Strand Releasing beginning October 29, 2021. It premiered at the Quad Cinema in New York City, before being released on PVOD services and in Los Angeles and Glendale on November 5. The film was later released at The Loft Cinema in Tucson on November 10 and the Syndicated Bar Theater in Brooklyn on November 19.

== Reception ==
Critical reception for Cicada has been positive, and the movie holds a rating of 93% on Rotten Tomatoes based on 28 reviews, with an average rating of 8.1/10. The critical consensus on Rotten Tomatoes reads, "A feast for the eyes as well as the heart, Cicada takes a bittersweet -- and beautifully acted -- look at the bonds of love."

Variety's Guy Lodge reviewed Cicada, stating that it was an "untidy but beguiling study of two Brooklyn men negotiating romance and trauma". The Hollywood Reporter praised the film's characters, while also writing that the "stylistic leaps can also be overdone and vague". Albert Nowicki of Prime Movies labelled the film as "naturalistic", and praised the actors for their "raw", "understated" performances.

=== Awards ===
- Audience Award at Image+Nation (2020, won)
- Jury Prize at LesGaiCineMad, Madrid International LGBT Film Festival
- Honorable Mention in Narrative Feature at NewFest: New York's LGBT Film Festival
- 2nd Place for Jury Prize in Best Feature at OUTshine Film Festival
- Audience Award for Best Narrative Feature at Oslo/Fusion International Film Festival
- Jury Award for Best Feature Film at Out Film CT
- Jury Award (Best Feature)+ Audience Award (Best Male Feature) at Roze Filmdagen; Amsterdam LGBTQ Film Festival
