= Project Mc2 =

American streaming television series

Project Mc^{2}
- Genre: Comedy; Educational
- Created by: Jordana Arkin
- Starring: Mika Abdalla; Ysa Penarejo; Victoria Vida; Genneya Walton; Antonio Marziale; Marcus Choi; Madeline Whitby; Bernardo De Paula; Troy Fromin; Oliver Vaquer; Danica McKellar; Alyssa Lynch; Belle Shouse
- Theme music composer: Gabriel Mann; Jeannie Lurie
- Ending theme: "Project Mc^{2}" by Allie Feder
- Composers: Joe Johnson; William Kevin Anderson
- Country of origin: United States
- Original language: English
- No. of seasons: 6
- No. of episodes: 26

Production
- Executive producers: Isaac Larian; Brian Robbins; Shauna Phelan; Joe Davola; Brett Bouttier; Jordana Arkin; Michael Younesi
- Producers: Sadaf Cohen Muncy; Scott Levine; Don Dunn
- Production locations: Los Angeles; Vancouver
- Cinematography: Barry Norwood; Vincent De Paula
- Running time: 24–29 minutes
- Production companies: AwesomenessTV; MGA Entertainment; Katlin/Bernstein Productions

Original release
- Network: Netflix
- Release: August 7, 2015 – November 7, 2017

Project Mc^{2} (pronounced Project M.C.–squared) is an American comedy television series co-produced for Netflix by MGA Entertainment and – despite being a live action series – by DreamWorks Animation's AwesomenessTV. The series was first released on August 7, 2015. The last set of episodes was released on November 7, 2017.

== Plot ==
Set in the fictional town of Maywood Glen, California, and revolving around the fields of STEAM, the series follows the adventures of McKeyla McAlister and her best friends, who work for a government organization called NOV8 (pronounced "innovate"), a highly secretive group of female government operatives who are trying to protect the world.

== Cast and characters ==
=== Main ===
- Mika Abdalla as McKeyla McAlister, the lead girl and an agent of NOV8. At the beginning of Part 4, she was given the name "The Owl".
- Ysa Penarejo as Camryn Coyle, the engineer with a high IQ
- Victoria Vida as Adrienne Attoms, the culinary chemist from Spain who always wears high heels
- Genneya Walton as Bryden Bandweth, the tech junkie of the group
- Antonio Marziale as Prince Xander (main: Part 1, recurring: Part 4)
- Marcus Choi (main: Part 1) and Ash Lee (recurring: Part 5) as Charles Coyle, Camryn's father
- Madeline Whitby as Jillian (Part 1)
- Bernardo De Paula as Defector (Part 1)
- Troy Fromin as George the Security Guard (Part 1)
- Oliver Vaquer as Francois (Part 1)
- Danica McKellar as the Quail (Parts 1–2, 4–6 (Note: McKellar only appears in the final episode of Part 6, "Family Affair", although credited as a main cast member.)), the group's chief intelligence agent in NOV8 and McKeyla's mother
- Alyssa Lynch (main: Parts 2–4 (Note: Lynch appears in archive footage, and is credited, in the final episode of Part 6, "Family Affair".)) and Maddie Phillips (recurring: Part 5) as Devon D'Marco, an aspiring artist
- Belle Shouse as Ember Evergreen (Parts 2–6)

=== Recurring ===
- Jonathon Buckley as Henry (Part 1)
- Melissa Mabie as A.D.I.S.N. (voice), McKeyla's talking notebook. Her name is short for "Advanced Digital Intelligence Spy Notebook". It is pronounced as "Addison".
- Johanna Newmarch as Carson Lazarus (Parts 2–3)
- Ty Wood as Justin (Parts 2–3)
- Maxwell Haynes as Kyle (Parts 2–6)
- Adrian Petriw as Retro (voice; Part 2)
- Kurt Evans as Assistant Principal Wilson (Part 2)
- Vanessa Parise as the Falcon (Part 3), McKeyla's aunt Montana who is also a substitute for the Quail while she's off the grid
- Sarah Desjardins as Maddy McAlister (Parts 3–4, 6), McKeyla's big sister. At the beginning of Part 4, she was given the name "The Nighthawk".
- Adam Beauchesne as Simon Temple (Part 3)
- Emily Delahunty as Tessa (Part 5)
- Houston Stevenson as Zach (Parts 5–6)
- Jody Thompson as Jenny Wallis (Part 5)
- Catherine Haggquist as Dr. A. Crawford (Part 5)
- Richard Ian Cox as Professor Kato (Part 5)
- Jay Hindle as Max McAlister (Part 6), McKeyla's father
- Chris Rosamond as Bobby Stone (Part 6)
- Loretta Walsh as Charlotte Adele (Part 6)

== Episodes ==
Part	Episodes	Originally released
1	3	August 7, 2015
2	6	August 12, 2016
3	6	October 14, 2016
4	1	February 14, 2017
5	5	September 15, 2017
6	5	November 7, 2017

=== Part 1 (2015) ===
No. overall	No. in part	Title	Directed by	Written by	Original release date
1	1	"The New Girl"	Michael Younesi	Jordana Arkin	August 7, 2015
McKeyla McAlister receives a new mission. She transfers to a school in Maywood Glen, where she bumps into two girls, Camryn and Bryden. A computer AI program in her notebook, A.D.I.S.N., accidentally speaks in front of the girls, which causes them to become suspicious. Meanwhile, Space Inc. receives an anonymous phone call threatening them with serious consequences for everyone if they don't cancel Prince Xander's space flight. Camryn's dad remembers that he left his laptop closed at the office, but when he went back in the morning, it was open. The girls suspect McKeyla is involved, and ask Adrienne to help them get the fingerprint from the laptop. They steal McKeyla's pen and manage to get a partial fingerprint match. They follow her, but shortly, McKeyla notices that they had given her a camera pen and catches the girls spying on her. They get into the house before she can stop them, and they meet McKeyla's boss, the Quail, who is a member of NOV8. She reveals that they are trying to protect the prince, and invites the girls to join McKeyla in the mission.
2	2	"Secret Agenting"	Michael Younesi	Jordana Arkin	August 7, 2015
McKeyla is doubting that the girls can take the job seriously enough, and would prefer working alone, but NOV8 wants her to have extra support due to the threat against the prince. McKeyla wants the girls to show her their skills. Adrienne makes a volcano cake. Bryden takes a picture of McKeyla and hacks into her lab's wireless system to display it on every screen in the lab. Camryn makes a "portable police scanner with added features", which they use to locate the prince. The girls notice a suspicious car, and manage to distract the guards and break into the facility where they're keeping the prince. They warn the prince that someone might be trying to kidnap him, and they take him to Bryden's house. NOV8 discovers that the prince's capsule will come close to a U.S. government cyber-satellite at the peak of his flight. Meanwhile, their location is discovered because Bryden tweeted from there, so they take the prince to a NOV8 safe house. Later, they find out that the logo they saw on the car belongs to a cyber security company called Black Star. A few minutes later, the girls get distracted and the prince disappears.
3	3	"Smart Is the New Cool"	Michael Younesi	Jordana Arkin	August 7, 2015
The girls research the organization called Black Star, and interrogate one of their top agents, who believes that they are doing wrong but is too scared to turn them in to the authorities. It turns out that they were not trying to kidnap the prince at all, but instead they are using his luggage to store a device that can be used to hack into a government satellite. It will allow Black Star to access each and every person's personal data, such as email, texting, and other information that they can then sell for billions of dollars. The four sneak into the launch site, find the device inside the prince's luggage, and destroy it before they are caught by security. Black Star's head, Darone, is caught and Jillian, the prince's assistant, is revealed to be working for them out of contempt that the prince can boss her around and she can do nothing about it, and sent to jail as well. In the end, the prince goes to space and he sends the girls a Snapchat from space, and McKeyla is given permission from the Quail to stay at Maywood Glen as her base. She is shown to be attending school with her friends.

=== Part 2 (2016) ===
No. overall	No. in part	Title	Directed by	Written by	Original release date
4	1	"Back to Basics"	Michael Younesi	Mitchel Katlin & Nat Bernstein	August 12, 2016
The four girls are demoted back to basics after they make a big deal out of saving the prince in Part 1. They are not allowed on any mission, even as a suspicious figure, Carson Lazarus, a criminal mastermind, is released from jail. Soon after, a figure who calls themselves "Retro" causes all technology to malfunction and glitch in Maywood Glen. The girls strongly suspect that the two are linked. The video shows that in the background, there is something labeled "Property of MGA" – where MGA stands for Maywood Glen Academy – and it is very possible that Retro is a student at the academy. Meanwhile, McKeyla tries to fit in and becomes "study buddies" with Kyle Lewis, a rather awkward and suspicious teenager.
5	2	"No Laughing Matter"	Michael Younesi	Paul Ciancarelli & David DiPietro	August 12, 2016
The Quail allows the four girls to figure out this case. McKeyla becomes increasingly suspicious of Kyle, but soon dismisses the idea of him being Retro. They also suspect Devon D'Marco, a troublemaker, as she spray-paints handcuffs on a picture of a drone on a poster about the upcoming launch. All four girls except Bry, who has to babysit, make ways to get detention on Saturday with Devon. Bry runs a vocal recognition as Cam and Adri confront the troublemaker and McKeyla looks through her bag. Devon is proven to be innocent, just using the school's 3D printer to make skulls for her nana's birthday. The three hide in the janitor's closet as the assistant principal walks by, and find out that Retro is planning to send a radio signal to the drone, making it crash, and pipe laughing gas through the vents so when the drone crashes, everybody will be laughing. The girls block the radio signal, and heat up the gas so it separates and becomes harmless.
6	3	"Trashed"	Vanessa Parise	Jessica Kaminsky	August 12, 2016
Retro broadcasts again, demanding he gets 4 of the country's most notorious hackers. The Quail has the girls start an investigation and they are led to Carson Lazarus' apartment. Cameryn implants a camera on Lazarus' cat, and find out she is heading to Cafe Atòms, Adrienne's cafe shop. The girls find out that Lazarus is Adrienne's new chef, and Retro broadcasts again, showing that Lazarus cannot be Retro. Retro demands the hackers get delivered that night at a warehouse, but since the mayor won't negotiate with criminals, the girls dress up and get voice changers to act in the criminal's place. When they arrive at the warehouse, they find out Retro wanted to eliminate them, and the Girls are dropped into a trash compactor. The girls are able to pierce the compactor with a piece of rebar, removing the pressure and stopping the compactor. Since Retro's plans are foiled, he causes a power outage in the city of Maywood Glen.
7	4	"Dam Fine Mess"	Vanessa Parise	Elizabeth Hackett & Hilary Galanoy	August 12, 2016
The girls discover that since Retro cannot be a student, they think Retro could be a teacher. The girls suspect that their geometry teacher, Mr. Gruber, is Retro, but while they snoop around, retro broadcasts using the word "Flood", so the girls meet up at Cafe Atòms and discover that Retro plans to flood Maywood Glen after the power outage causes the Maywood Glen Dam generators to disengage, so the girls are left with a short period of time to get the backup generators up and going before the spillways open. The girls use student Ember Evergreen's plant knowledge and discover that they can use trash as a power source towards the generators. They fill the generators with trash and are able to get the generators up and going.
8	5	"Bye Bye Birdie"	Michael Younesi	Annie Burgstede & Kate Duffy	August 12, 2016
After learning that Retro plans to overtake the White House, The Quail allows Bryden to turn NOV8's servers from defense to offense, allowing her to pinpoint Retro's location while he broadcasts. They find out that Retro lives in an apartment building and questions him. He reveals that he is an old MGA theater student and that a script and an envelope filled with money was left by his door every day. They arrest him but an NOV8 breach occurs, so The Quail tells the girls to forget their experience with NOV8 due to all the agent's locations being at risk of being compromised. McKeyla decides to investigate Lazarus' apartment and finds out that she has been keeping tabs on her and plans to kill them. She has an argument with The Quail and leaves.
9	6	"Mission Totally Possible"	Michael Younesi	Kathy Fischer	August 12, 2016
Lazarus contacts The Quail and justifies her plans to release the location of every NOV8 agent to their oppressors; McKeyla is revealed to have deferred to her side following her disagreement with The Quail. That night, Adrienne, Bryden, and Cameryn go to McKeyla's house and discover an acronym written on the wall, which leads to the discovery of A.D.I.S.N. The girls discover that McKeyla has merely created a ruse and has learned of Lazarus' true plans. The girls infiltrate HAVOC with the help of Ember and Devon, but are captured when Lazarus interrupts the reunion between McKeyla and the girls. Lazarus traps the girls in a cage, and electrifies the surrounding floor. With the help of Cameryn's rubber skateboard, the girls escape and learn that the servers of HAVOC are kept in a cold room to prevent them from overheating. With the help of Cameryn's water powered car, A.D.I.S.N programs the car to drive into the server room, while Bryden and Adrienne disengage the server room gates. When the car goes over its speed limit, it overheats and fries the servers completely, foiling the launch. Lazarus is captured and sent to jail, while Ember wins the science fair; McKeyla reconnects with Kyle.

=== Part 3 (2016) ===
No. overall	No. in part	Title	Directed by	Written by	Original release date
10	1	"Finding Maddy"	Michael Robison	Nat Bernstein & Mitchel Katlin	October 14, 2016
McKeyla and Adrienne question Lazarus in jail, and McKeyla finds out that her sister Maddy, who she hasn't seen in months, has joined HAVOC. A band named ELITE who originated in MGA, has come back to Maywood Glen from their world tour, and are looking for an opening act for a free concert they plan to perform at the school. Bryden and Cameryn plan to audition, and McKeyla's Aunt Montana, also known as The Falcon, has the girls investigate a string of robberies of the 3T minerals. The girls investigate at the docks, and Cameryn and Bryden find out that Justin, Cameryn's nemesis, plans to audition for the opening act as well. The girls follow McKeyla, who has set up a meeting with Maddy, in order to make sure she is safe. McKeyla finds them, and figures out that the date for ELITE's world tour also matches the dates for the 3T robberies.
11	2	"Gummying Up the Works"	Michael Robison	Paul Ciancarelli & David DiPietro	October 14, 2016
McKeyla tells The Falcon about Maddy, and she also tells Cameryn and Bryden that Maddy visited her in her sleep. McKeyla has Cameryn make a tracking device that is implanted in a gummy bear. Adrienne plans to have a Froyo-Friday at Cafe Atòms, something that Maddy always attended when McKeyla was little. Maddy arrives at Cafe Atòms under disguise, and Ember plants the gummy bear in her fryo. Cameryn and Bryden recruit Devon to paint them an awesome background for their audition, and Cameryn meets her idol, Simon, the founder of ELITE. however, Maddy knows that the girls are on to her, and the girls suspect the manager of ELITE to be the one behind the 3T robberies. They sneak into her hotel and get caught, but they come up with an identity that they are fans who come to show her their demo. They are kicked out, and follow her to the docks, where they discover that the supposed 3Ts are actually shirts she had made for the concert.
12	3	"Crate Expectations"	Ken Friss	Jessica Kaminsky	October 14, 2016
McKeyla has a dream where she finds Maddy at the hotel, and Cameryn and Bryden decide to focus on the 3T case other than on the audition. McKeyla tells them that auditioning is working on the case, since all the evidence points to someone connected to the band. Bryden and Cameryn suspect the light engineer, Brady, from the band to be behind the 3Ts and perform their audition and win, while McKeyla catches up with Kyle. Adrienne and Ember suspect that Maddy is behind the 3T robberies, so they head down to the docks and get trapped in a storage container, but escape. Bryden and Cameryn plant a camera on Brady and see he is in a rush to leave, but Maddy arrives at his hotel. She finds the camera and breaks it, confirming that she indeed has gone rogue.
13	4	"One Track Mind"	Ken Friss	Elizabeth Hackett & Hilary Galanoy	October 14, 2016
The girls show McKeyla the footage of Maddy, but McKeyla refuses to believe. Ember is able to sneak backstage and acts as a delivery man, pouring an itching liquid onto Brady's arm. He goes to the nurse's office where Adrienne and McKeyla are acting as nurses. They bribe Brady with a spray that calms the itching and find out that Eli is actually a fraud, having used frequency noises to make his music sound good. On the night of the concert, the band performs while McKeyla and Adrienne investigate at the docks. Eli is revealed to be a hologram, and the real Eli is at the docks, where he uses a mysterious frequency device to knock out McKeyla and Adrienne, and McKeyla is able to spot Maddy behind him before she passes out.
14	5	"Simon Sayz"	Jon Rosenbaum	Elaine Aronson	October 14, 2016
After the confrontation at the docks, Bryden is able to find out where Eli is currently at using an old online show he made before he joined ELITE. They arrive at his grandma's house where Adrienne and Cameryn distract her, while McKeyla and Bryden confront Eli in the garage. They find out he was ordered to make a machine capable to destroy buildings by a mystery man, and that he is to deliver that machine to him at the docks later that day. The girls order Eli to take them there, where the mystery man is revealed to be Simon, followed by Maddy, who knocks out the girls using her own version of A.D.I.S.N, B.A.D.I.S.N. After being tied up in chairs, Simon uses the machine to knock down the building, but Maddy is able to save them, revealing that she had never been working for them in the first place. They find out that the machine is to be exchanged with a man named Kragen Vexx at the art gallery opening the next day.
15	6	"Ear Today. Gone Tomorrow"	Jon Rosenbaum	Kathy Fischer	October 14, 2016
At the art gallery opening, Bryden and Cameryn act as receptionists at the front office, while the rest of the girls act as visitors. The girls use secret NOV8 spy contacts to be able to see what Maddy sees while the exchange happens. When Maddy asks to meet Kragen, Simon places frequency headphones on Maddy to make her lose her memory, but McKeyla intervenes and saves Maddy. Bryden is able to get a picture of Kragen's ear, and Adrienne stalls everyone while they try to find a matching earprint. When they find out that Kragen is the bass player, the girls confront him and trap him in a cocoon using a freezing agent. When McKeyla exits the building, she is taken by a secret operative and is placed inside a van with the other girls.

=== Part 4 (2017) ===
No. overall	No. in part	Title	Directed by	Written by	Original release date
16	1	"A Royal Pain"	Ken Friss	Elizabeth Hackett & Hilary Galanoy	February 14, 2017
In the van, the girls hatch a plan to escape, but not before the doors open and see The Quail. Maddy reveals to them that they are in NOV8 headquarters, and Maddy and McKeyla get bird names after helping stop Kragen. Devon is marked as an NOV8 agent in training after seeing the showdown at the gallery, and the girls reunite with Prince Xander, who is to be made king in a few days. He reveals to them that he has created a solar powered backpack that is being demonstrated in Maywood Glen, in order to convince his country that he is capable of being king. McKeyla is assigned to help him stay on task, although the king begins to act silly and childish, shocking McKeyla after he promised to grow up during his space launch. At the demonstration, he is revealed to be Xander's evil twin brother in disguise, who wants to show the world that Xander is too silly to be king so he can take his place instead. He reveals that he rigged the backpack to explode on the demonstrator, who is revealed to be Kyle. When the 2 Xanders meet, McKeyla is confused between who is the real one, but finds out after one of the Xanders shows emotion. She reveals him to the audience, and the demonstration goes well.

=== Part 5 (2017) ===
No. overall	No. in part	Title	Directed by	Written by	Original release date
17	1	"If You Fail on Mars Can Anyone Hear You Scream"	Ken Friss	Mitchel Katlin	September 15, 2017
The girls are assigned a mission at Space Inc. after NOV8 data shows that someone plans to steal a piece of nanotechnology made by Professor Kato, that uses tiny medical robots in order to help bad cells replicate into new ones. After failing to stop the intruder, McKeyla begins to doubt her skills. Cameryn and Ember are accepted into Space Inc.'s Destination Mars Camp, orchestrated by Dr. Crawford, the director of Space Inc. Cameryn's dad, Charles, begins a romantic interest in Jenny Wallis, mother of Destination Mars member, Tessa Wallis, who also begins a friendship with Ember. When McKeyla and Devon investigate Professor Kato's house, they accidentally trigger a bomb that blows it up.
18	2	"Nanobots, Souffles and Gray Goo, Oh My"	Ken Friss	Nat Bernstein	September 15, 2017
Bryden finds out that the nanotechnology is deadly, and if it gets into the wrong hands, could be used as a weapon. Bryden and Adrienne pose as secret agents and question Crawford about Kato's disappearance. After a technology malfunction at the Destination Mars Camp, the team builds a radio and is able to resume contact with the international space station. Adrienne finds out celebrity baker Olivia James is coming to Cafe Atoms to find a new desert for her Mars Menu and plans to make a soufflè, and asks Bryden to help her. After hearing a distress call through their radio, Ember and Cameryn fill in the girls, and they find out the signal came from Kato, who is found in a bomb shelter in Space Inc.'s basement.
19	3	"Bad Air Day"	Michael Younesi	Elizabeth Hackett & Hilary Galanoy	September 15, 2017
Believing Kato tried to steal the nanotechnology, the girls try to arrest him, but he explains that he had been kidnapped, having swallowed a tracking beacon for the danger of the device he was working on. McKeyla decides to investigate Crawford again, but overhears Charles speaking Bulgarian over the phone, the same language the intruder spoke on the night of the robbery. Adrienne and Bryden get into a fight and stop speaking to each other after her sufflè attempts fail. McKeyla, Adrienne, and Bryden spy on charles when he meets someone In the parking lot, but in reality, he was just pawning a comic book for money to pay for Cameryn's Camp. Ember and Cameryn suspect Gordon, a member of Destination Mars, after he repeatedly leaves the group every night. They follow him into a gas chamber and get trapped inside, with deadly gas filling the room. Gordon, whose real name is Ryan, reveals he is an adventure blogger and was asked to infiltrate the Destination Mars Camp by the name of Gordon. Cameryn uses a diamond necklace and a power drill to create a small drill tool to bust a hole in the door window, allowing them to escape.
20	4	"Totally Marble Nailed It"	Michael Younesi	Kathleen Fischer	September 15, 2017
After Ryan's phone Is wiped clean, Bryden works on recovering the footage. Meanwhile at Destination Mars, the group begins their Mars simulation, living in a small room called The HAB. Devon helps Adrienne and Bryden overcome their problems, and McKeyla breaks up with Kyle. Charles and Jenny go on a date, but after Bryden is able to recover the footage, she finds Jenny in the background of Ryan's video. They find Charles and Jenny on the roof, but she explains herself. When Ember doesn't find Tessa in her bed, it is revealed that Tessa has stolen the nanotechnology.
21	5	"Gray Goo on the Loose"	Ken Friss	Nat Bernstein & Mitchel Katlin	September 15, 2017
After the date, Jenny demands that Tessa give her the nanotechnology, but Tessa refuses, saying that she doesn't think its right to hurt innocent people. Ember, who overheard their conversation, sides with Tessa. Crawford appears behind Jenny, ordering Jenny to take the nanotechnology from Tessa. Tessa locks herself in the HAB along with everyone else. The girls find out the nanotechnology is missing. Jenny plans to flee the country, but is approached by McKeyla. Jenny tries to subdue McKeyla, but McKeyla is able to subdue her herself. After Crawford is subdued by Adrienne and Bryden, she breaks open the nanotechnology's protective cocoon, and it starts to replicate. Cameryn tells Zach, Justin's brother, who also is attending Destination Mars, that the nanotechnology will consume everything in its path, including them. After the goo starts destroying everything in the HAB, the girls put on their space suits to protect themselves. Using one of Adrienne's sufflè recipes, the girls find a way to stop the goo: ridding it of its oxygen using a fire extinguisher. After freezing it using the fire extinguisher, Tessa apologizes to Ember, and she, along with Crawford and Jenny, go to jail. A couple of days later, McKeyla is able to obtain her drivers license, which she has been trying to obtain through the season, and Adrienne is able to make a successful sufflè for Olivia James. McKeyla then spots a piece of origami on a table, reminiscing about her childhood with her dad.

=== Part 6 (2017) ===
No. overall	No. in part	Title	Directed by	Written by	Original release date
22	1	"Stone Acres Is the Place to Be"	Ken Friss	Mitchel Katlin	November 7, 2017
Bobby Stone, founder of Stone Water and Stone Acres, is celebrating his New Engineers Program when a bomb threat forces them out of the building. In the basement, the girls find the bomb and diffuse it. The girls suspect SPIN, an activist group who is mad towards Stone's use of plastic, and McKeyla's father, Max, who was accused of stealing money from Stone when McKeyla used to live in Maywood Glen. The girls look back at the security camera footage and find a man with a tattoo that reads "no regrets" entering the building around the same time the threat was announced. Bryden starts a science show called "Bry-ence", where she talks about different types of science with the girls. Bryden and Cameryn sign up for the prom dance, and McKeyla has a hard time reconnecting with Kyle. The girls attend a SPIN meeting and find "No Regrets" sitting in the audience. They follow him around the school where the meeting is being held but learn that his tattoo was actually spelled "No Regreets".
23	2	"Smoke Gets in Your Eyes"	Allan Harmon	Elaine Aronson	November 7, 2017
The girls suspect Farmer Charlotte Adele, who owns a farm next to Stone Acres and who protested against Stone minutes before the threat. Bryden hosts her show with McKeyla while Cameryn tries to ask Kyle out for McKeyla but accidentally makes it seem like she's asking him out herself. Adrienne and Bryden stall Adele at Cafe Atoms while Ember and Cameryn investigate at Adele's farm. The girls are invited to Stone's house for dinner where they meet M.I.L.E.S, his smart home's curator. Bryden's show gets offered a spot on Stone's television program, Stone Network. McKeyla and the girls host a magic show in hopes of attracting Max, who always took McKeyla to see magic shows when she was little. McKeyla's toolbox is rigged, having the room fill with smoke during one of her tricks. The girls try to leave but find that the doors have been chained. McKeyla vents out the smoke and uses a bobby pin to unlock the chains. She encounters Max outside, who warns her to stay away from Stone. He uses a trick to disappear, allowing for Maddy to show up.
24	3	"Zorro Dark Thirty"	Allan Harmon	Elizabeth Hackett & Hilary Galanoy	November 7, 2017
Maddy explains that she showed up after hearing about the bombing attempt at Stone Acres, although she doesn't believe Max could be up to such a diabolical plan. Bryden's show gets a huge upgrade after being sponsored by Stone Water, and starts gaining popularity around the school, although Ember doesn't agree with Stone's water. Cameryn tells McKeyla about Kyle, but she doesn't really think of it as a big deal. The girls dress up as Devon's comic book characters for the masquerade prom. Ember and Cameryn go around trying to convince people to stop the use of plastic, while Kyle searches for McKeyla, who is hot on the trail of a masked figure following her around the school. He corners McKeyla in a classroom, but is soon stopped by Max. Maddy soon intervenes, and McKeyla finds a piece of origami on a desk. She reveals to the girls that she has been collecting pieces of origami that Max had been leaving her over the past few years. The girls unravel them and find out that the pieces of paper used is a scientific report of her Max's work on Stone Water.
25	4	"Water from a Bobby Stone"	Ken Friss	Kathleen Fischer	November 7, 2017
The research paper shows that Stone's water doesn't actually have any brain-enhancing properties like Stone had stated. The girls inform Bryden of their information after she reveals that she has been nominated for an award for her performance on "Bry-Ence". Ember and Adrienne host a poll to see the difference between Stone Water and regular tap water. Meanwhile, McKeyla and Maddy sneak into stone's penthouse and A.D.I.S.N is able to bribe M.I.L.E.S into revealing that Stone actually transferred the money from his own bank account into Max's. Back at the lab, the results from the poll is revealed: Stone Water is regular tap water. When the girls use some of their knowledge from Space Inc.'s study on droughts, they find out that Stone has been pumping in water from right under Farmer Adele's farm. The girls decide to pay Stone a visit and hitch a ride on one of Stone's transport trucks. They question Stone, and he reveals he framed Max after he threatened to release his research to the public. He also threatens to tell the world who the girls really are if word about his research ever gets out
26	5	"Family Affair"	Ken Friss	Elaine Aronson	November 7, 2017
A.D.I.S.N is able to bribe Miles into revealing Max's location. The girls sneak inside of the Young Voices Awards Ceremony when they pose undercover as a band. When Bryden goes to accept her award, she exposes Stone to the audience. In retaliation, Stone begins to exhale toxin fumes into the room where Max is being held hostage. Bryden and Adrienne work to cut off Stone's water from under Adele's farm while Maddy and McKeyla attempt to rescue Max. McKeyla spots a welding machine, and is later seen attempting to weaken the support beam to cave in the roof with Max above. Maddy and McKeyla fight off No Regrets and Stone, which ends with Max's rescue. Stone is taken to jail while Max emotionally reunites with the Quail, whose name is revealed to be Molly. Bryden apologizes to Cameryn and Ember for rebuffing their suspicions about Stone. McKeyla reconciles with Kyle, whose apology has been unknowingly live-streamed to the audience. The two kiss, and shortly after, a montage of all of the girls' celebratory moments are shown, ending with the girls' own in the lab.

== Production ==
The first season of the series, consisting of three episodes, was released on August 7, 2015. On April 6, 2016, Netflix announced that the series has been renewed for its second and third seasons. The second season was released on August 12, 2016, and the third season was released on October 14, 2016. Both consisted of six episodes. An extended 34-minute Valentine's Day special was released as the first and only episode of the fourth season on February 14, 2017. A fifth season consisting of five episodes was released on September 15, 2017. A sixth season, also consisting of five episodes, was released on November 7, 2017.

The series is filmed primarily in and around the San Fernando Valley area of Los Angeles, including Chatsworth, Woodland Hills, Van Nuys, and Northridge, as well as in Alhambra.
