= Carmen Christopher =

American actor and comedian

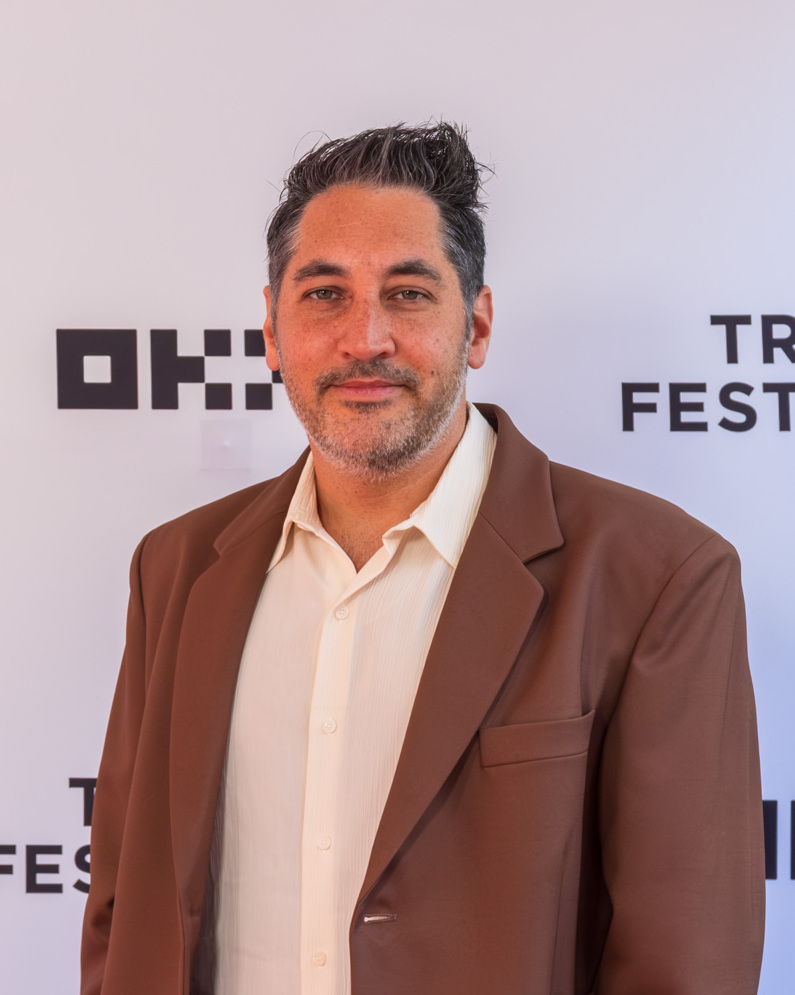
- Christopher in 2026
- Born: Chicago, Illinois, U.S.
- Occupations: Actor; stand-up comedian; writer; producer

Carmen Christopher is an American actor and comedian. He plays Rick on English Teacher on the FX Network. He has played Chester on The Bear since season one. He has had recurring roles on Killing It, Joe Pera Talks To You, Shrill, and Search Party. Christopher was born in Chicago, Illinois, United States and got into comedy after taking improv classes at the Second City. In 2024 he starred in the comedy show Live From the Windy City.

== Filmography ==
=== Film ===
| Year | Title | Role | Notes |
|---|---|---|---|
| 2019 | Otherhood | Delivery Guy | |
| 2023 | First Time Female Director | Ed | |
| 2023 | Please Don't Destroy: The Treasure of Foggy Mountain | Carmen | |
| 2024 | Adult Best Friends | Phil | |
| 2024 | Friendship | Jimp | |
| 2026 | Never Change! | Tedi Mayo | |
| TBA | Blowback 2: Master of Espionage - The Return | Agent Ratthew | Post-production |
| TBA | Little One † | | Filming |

=== Television ===
| Year | Title | Role | Notes |
|---|---|---|---|
| 2016 | Late Night with Seth Meyers | Lil Bobo | Episode: "S4.E17" |
| 2017 | At Home with Amy Sedaris | Calvin Shuckles | Episode: "Gift Giving" |
| 2017-18 | The Chris Gethard Show | various roles | 4 episodes |
| 2019 | High Maintenance | Mack | Episode: "Breathwork" |
| 2019 | Chris Gethard Presents | Self | 5 episodes |
| 2019 | Alternatino with Arturo Castro | Ivan | 2 episodes |
| 2019 | Sunnyside | Tanner C. | Episode: "Skirt-Skirt!" |
| 2020-21 | Shrill | Beau | 3 episodes |
| 2020-21 | Joe Pera Talks with You | Carlos | 2 episodes |
| 2021 | Santa Inc. | various voices | 7 episodes |
| 2022 | Search Party | Vernon | 2 episodes |
| 2022 | Killing It | Matt | 2 episodes |
| 2022-26 | The Bear | Chester | 12 episodes |
| 2023 | I Think You Should Leave with Tim Robinson | Guy #1 | Episode: "Don't Just Say 'Relax', Actually Relax." |
| 2024-25 | English Teacher | Rick | 18 episodes |
| 2024 | After Midnight | Self | Contestant |
