= Nick Adams (actor, born 1983) =

American actor, singer, and dancer

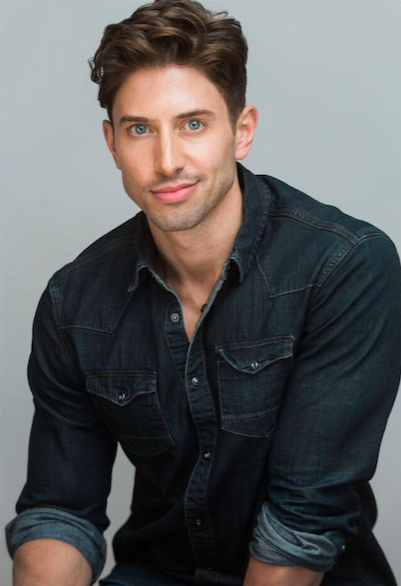
- Born: Nicholas Adams; June 10, 1983 (age 42); Erie, Pennsylvania, US
- Education: Boston Conservatory (BFA)
- Occupations: Actor, Singer, Dancer
- Years active: 1999–present
- Website: nicholasadams.com

Nicholas Adams (born June 10, 1983) is an American actor, singer, and dancer, known for starring as Adam/Felicia in the original Broadway production of Priscilla, Queen of the Desert and starring as Whizzer Brown in the first national tour of the Lincoln Center Theater revival of Falsettos.

== Career ==
In 2005, Adams earned a BFA in musical theatre with a minor in dance from the Boston Conservatory of Music. In New York, he joined the international tour of the musical Chicago, later joining the Broadway cast. He was also in the original Broadway cast of The Pirate Queen. In 2007, he co-starred with Mario Lopez as Larry in the Broadway revival of A Chorus Line. In June 2009 he was in the original cast of the Broadway revival of Guys and Dolls.

In 2010, Adams played Angelique in the original Tony-winning revival cast of La Cage aux Folles on Broadway at the Longacre Theatre, starring Kelsey Grammer. He starred as Adam/Felicia in Priscilla, Queen of the Desert, which opened at the Palace Theater on March 20, 2011 after a short run in Toronto at the Princess of Wales Theatre. On February 4, 2014, Adams joined the first national tour of Wicked and was the final actor to star in the role of Fiyero.

In 2016, Adams appeared in season two of the sketch LGBT-themed comedy web series Go-Go Boy Interrupted. In 2019, he appeared on the first season of the Comedy Central series The Other Two as Dallas Drake, and starred as Whizzer Brown in the first national tour of the Lincoln Center Theater revival of Falsettos. His other TV and film credits include: Sex and the City 2, An Englishman in New York, Smash, As the World Turns, Guiding Light, Dancing with the Stars, Rosie Live, It Could Be Worse, the Kennedy Center Honors, and multiple telecasts of the Tony Awards.

Adams, who is gay, was a part of a PSA for the It Gets Better campaign with cast members from Priscilla Queen of the Desert in 2010. In December 2012, Adams was a backing dancer in Cheyenne Jackson's video for his single, Don't Wanna Know.

In 2024, he portrayed a lifeguard in Dylan Mulvaney's music video for "Days of Girlhood."

== Awards and nominations ==
In 2011, Adams won two Broadway.com Audience Choice Awards, for "Favorite Breakthrough Performance" and "Favorite Diva Performance" for his role in Priscilla, Queen of the Desert. Adams was also nominated for the 2011 Astaire Award for Best Dancer on Broadway and honored by the American Theatre Hall of Fame for his role in Priscilla, Queen of the Desert.
