= Home Run Showdown =

- Film poster
- Directed by: Oz Scott
- Written by: Tim Cavanaugh; John Bella
- Produced by: Joe Gressis; Dena Hysell
- Starring: Matthew Lillard; Dean Cain
- Cinematography: David Stockton
- Edited by: Joe Gressis
- Music by: Austin Wintory
- Production company: Secret Handshake Entertainment
- Distributed by: RLJE Films
- Release date: October 3, 2012 (limited)
- Running time: 94 minutes
- Country: United States
- Language: English

Home Run Showdown is a 2012 American family sports film directed by Oz Scott and starring Matthew Lillard and Dean Cain.

== Cast ==
- Matthew Lillard as Joey
- Dean Cain as Rico
- Annabeth Gish as Michelle
- Barry Bostwick as Big Al
- Wayne Duvall as Simpson
- Stephanie Koenig as Aunt Janey Moore

== Production ==
The film was shot in Fifth Third Field in Toledo, Ohio.

== Reception ==
Tracy Moore of Common Sense Media awarded the film three stars out of five.
