= They Live in the Grey =

- Theatrical release poster
- Directed by: Abel Vang; Burlee Vang
- Written by: Abel Vang; Burlee Vang
- Produced by: Stephen Stanley; Abel Vang; Burlee Vang
- Starring: Michelle Krusiec; Ken Kirby; Madelyn Grace; J.R. Cacia; Ellen Wroe
- Cinematography: Jimmy Jung Lu
- Edited by: Cole Duran
- Music by: David Williams
- Production companies: STANDOFF Pictures; Whiskey Stream Productions
- Distributed by: Shudder
- Release date: February 17, 2022 (United States)
- Running time: 123 minutes
- Country: United States
- Language: English

They Live in the Grey is a 2022 American supernatural horror film, written and directed by Abel Vang and Burlee Vang. The film stars Michelle Krusiec, Ken Kirby, Madelyn Grace, J.R. Cacia, and Ellen Wroe. The movie was released via streaming service Shudder on February 17, 2022.

== Plot ==
Claire Yang a worker at CPS, and her police officer husband, Peter spend a somber evening recounting the memory of their dead son.

Claire is shown to be able to see ghosts, and even interact with them. Some ghosts end up physically harming her in some way, while others just yell or stare. She is shown to deal with them by using pills and sleeping in the closet among other things.

She is called to the house of a potentially abused child, Sophie Lang. While there she meets the parents, Audrey, a part-time travel agent and Giles, a realtor. Sophie, the daughter, has been showing up to school with various injuries that they first blame on skateboard falls but Claire is able to figure out there’s a ghost in the house. The ghost is shown performing a variety of tasks including tossing Sophie into a closet, and forcing Audrey’s hand onto a knife.

Through flashbacks more is revealed about Claire and Peter as well as details on how they lost their son, Lucas. Claire sees Lucas’ ghost and suffers quietly while her husband lashes out at work including assaulting a man in custody.

Back in the present Claire agrees to Audrey’s request that she try to contact the ghost. During the seance she has visions of a woman in a nightgown at a spinning wheel, and later kneeling in the bathroom with slit wrists, before seeing the woman murdering a man in the house, along with flashes of a young dead boy.

The visions put Claire into a catatonic state and she wakes up in the hospital next to a woman named Ada, who gives her life advice. She leaves her room at night and encounters several ghosts. When she returns to her room she sees Ada, out of bed, marveling at her ability to walk. Claire suggests that Ada has a “choice” to leave, and Ada agrees before vanishing.

Audrey tells Claire she’s experiencing fugue states, and confirms that Giles cheated on her while she was pregnant with Sophie, and adds that he only came back because she was pregnant. Claire shares the full story of her son’s death via a hit and run while walking home from school because she was too high to drive him home. She tells Audrey firmly that she is “going to lose her daughter”.

Claire dreams of the woman in the nightgown. The next day, Audrey confronts her about the upcoming CPS hearing to remove Sophie from the home. This surprises Claire, as she tells Audrey that she hasn't turned in the file on Sophie yet. Claire then finds out that her boss turned Sophie's CPS file in without her knowledge, and after informing Claire of this, he fires her. Claire drives to the field where her son's body was found and finds his ghost there. She helps him to move on to the afterlife, while finally allowing herself to move on with her life as well.

At home she dumps all her pills down the sink and moves back into her bedroom from the closet before calling Peter and saying she wants to tell him everything, inviting him over that night.

Later, Claire is confronted by the woman in the nightgown who shows her another vision clarifying that the man she had killed was her husband and she had murdered him to avenge their son, whom the husband had strangled. The woman then shows Claire visions of Audrey hitting Sophie, and that the ghost had been protecting Sophie by throwing her in the closet, not hurting her.

Claire drives to Sophie’s house to find the door open. The woman in the nightgown leads her inside to find Audrey pointing a gun at Giles. She admits that she was the one who had been causing the injuries to Sophie, not the ghost. Audrey explains to a shocked Giles that he "took her life" from her when he got her pregnant with Sophie. As revenge, she tells Claire that she's going to kill Sophie and then herself, so that Giles will have to suffer the rest of his life as well. Claire tries to grab the gun, but it accidentally goes off, killing Giles. Audrey and Claire wrestle for the gun, firing it into the ceiling until it's empty. Claire eventually fights off Audrey, causing her to tumble to the bottom of the stairs, seemingly dead.

Claire goes back in the room to get Sophie, but when they return to the stairs Audrey's body is gone. She and Sophie run for the front door, but Audrey appears and stabs Claire in the lower back before they can escape. While on the floor injured, Claire tells Sophie to run. Audrey attacks Claire again, stabbing her in the leg this time. Before she can kill Claire, however, Sophie returns and hits her mom with a pan. Claire pleads for the ghost in the nightgown to help them, and her plea is answered as Audrey suddenly has her arm, leg, and finally her neck snapped by an invisible force, killing her. The ghost then appears to Claire, no longer frightening looking, and they both acknowledge each other before she disappears to the afterlife.

Peter shows up to find an unconscious Claire in the kitchen and calls for help. They are next shown with a healing Claire on crutches as they visit Lucas’ grave. Claire confesses her ability to Peter and tells him she has decided to use it to help ghosts move on. The final scene shows Claire sitting in a couples' house, as the couple asks her if she can help them with a ghost problem.

== Cast ==
- Michelle Krusiec as Claire Yang
- Ken Kirby as Peter Yang
- Madelyn Grace as Sophie Lang
- J.R. Cacia as Giles Lang
- Ellen Wroe as Audrey Lang
- Mercedes Manning as The Woman
- Willie S. Hosea as Lloyd
- Audrey Moore as Jane
- Jaden Tran as Lucas Yang

== Reception ==
On the review aggregator website Rotten Tomatoes, 62% of 13 critics' reviews are positive.

Matt Donato of Paste wrote, "They Live in the Grey is a modest indie with thematic layers and evergreen mortal dread that could use two or three more editing bay passes. The longer everything goes, the harder actors strain to grasp the heartbreaking poignancy of irreplaceable loss. At times, They Live in the Grey can feel bisected between Claire’s paranormal home life and Sophie’s possible abuse, made worse by the Vangs’ choice to ditch linear storytelling for sometimes unnoticeable chronological leaps. It’s a courageous approach to relatable horrors that foolishly fails to keep things simple—one that desperately requires more focus to let Claire’s introspective gravedance truly shine." Leslie Felperin of The Guardian stated, "They Live in the Grey is another classy effort on the Shudder streaming platform, properly scary and thoughtfully constructed, with unusual editing and framing sleights of hand..."
