= English Teacher (TV series) =

American television sitcom

- Genre: Sitcom
- Created by: Brian Jordan Alvarez
- Starring: Brian Jordan Alvarez; Stephanie Koenig; Enrico Colantoni; Sean Patton; Carmen Christopher
- Country of origin: United States
- Original language: English
- No. of seasons: 2
- No. of episodes: 18

Production
- Executive producers: Brian Jordan Alvarez; Paul Simms; Jonathan Krisel; Dave King
- Running time: 22–25 minutes
- Production companies: Brian Jordan Alvarez Productions; 343 Incorporated; FXP

Original release
- Network: FX
- Release: September 2, 2024 – October 16, 2025
- Network: FX on Hulu
- Release: September 26, 2025

English Teacher is an American sitcom television series created by Brian Jordan Alvarez, who stars as main character Evan Marquez. The cast also includes Stephanie Koenig, Enrico Colantoni, Sean Patton, and Carmen Christopher. The series premiered on September 2, 2024, on FX. It received positive reviews from critics. In February 2025, English Teacher was renewed for a second season which premiered on September 25, 2025. In November 2025, the series was canceled after two seasons.

== Premise ==
High school teacher Evan Marquez finds himself at the intersection of professional, political, and personal aspects of working at a high school.

== Cast and characters ==
=== Main ===
- Brian Jordan Alvarez as Evan Marquez, an English teacher at Morrison-Hensley High School
- Stephanie Koenig as Gwen Sanders, a History teacher at the school and Evan's best friend
- Enrico Colantoni as Grant Moretti, the principal of the high school
- Sean Patton as Markie Hillridge, the gym teacher and athletic director at the high school
- Carmen Christopher as Rick Santana (season 2; recurring season 1), the school counselor at the high school

=== Recurring ===
- Jordan Firstman as Malcolm, Evan's on-again, off-again boyfriend and a former teacher at the high school
- Langston Kerman as Harry (season 1), a new teacher at the high school

==== Students ====
- Aliyah's Interlude as Tiffany, a student in Evan's class
- Savanna Gann as Becca, a student in Evan's class
- Ben Bondurant as Jeff, a student in Evan's class
- Mason Douglas as Frank, a student in Evan's class
- Scarlette Amber Hernandez as Monica, a student in Evan's class
- Blythe Middleton as Blake Harrison, Linda Harrison's son and a student in Evan's class.
- Matthew Smitley as Hartman, a student in Evan's class
- Treylan Newton as Tray, a student in Evan's class
- Pablo Maldonado-Hernandez as Pablo, a student in Evan's class
- Triniti Fong as Tina, a student in Evan's class

=== Guest ===
- Chris Riggi as Nick, Gwen's unemployed boyfriend who is building a pool in his backyard
- Trixie Mattel as Shazam, a drag queen and friend of Evan's
- Romy Mars as Kayla, a student in Evan's class who suffers from "Kayla Syndrome"
- Ivy Wolk as Chelsea, a student in Evan's class who is Kayla's best friend
- Dave Z. Martin as Jason, a student in Evan's class
- Jimmy Fowlie as Daniel, an overly friendly waiter
- Andrene Ward-Hammond as Sharon, a parent who often warns of ridiculous, non-existent new "trends" among teenagers
- Jenn Lyon as Linda Harrison, a parent and local business owner whom Evan finds himself at odds with
- Ken Kirby as Pasha, Evan's college friend who works for an energy startup
- Michael Strassner as Mitch, a gym teacher who might become Markie's replacement
- Laura Bayonas as Elena Marquez, Evan's mother

== Episodes ==
Season	Episodes	Originally released		
Season	Episodes	First released	Last released	Network
1	8	September 2, 2024	October 14, 2024	FX
2	10	September 25, 2025	September 26, 2025	FX / FX on Hulu

=== Season 1 (2024) ===
No. overall	No. in season	Title	Directed by	Written by	Original release date	Prod. code	U.S. viewers (millions)
1	1	"Pilot"	Jonathan Krisel	Brian Jordan Alvarez	September 2, 2024	XETV1001	0.212
Evan Marquez, a high school English teacher, finds himself under investigation when a parent reports him for kissing his now ex-boyfriend in front of students. He spends the week writing a statement in his defense, only for the investigation to be dropped when Markie, the gym teacher, threatens to reveal to the parent's country-club friends that her son is gay. The district forbids Evan from dating fellow faculty at the same time Harry, a handsome new teacher, attracts Evan's attention.
2	2	"Powderpuff"	Brian Jordan Alvarez	Stephanie Koenig	September 2, 2024	XETV1002	0.132
The school's powderpuff tradition is threatened by the school's LGBT alliance. Evan brings on a drag queen friend named Shazam to help the boys put on an authentic drag performance. Meanwhile, Gwen coaches the girls in playing football with Markie's assistance, but the teachers are convinced to teach the girls self-defense instead. After realizing Shazam is stealing things from the school, Grant cancels the powderpuff performance, but the students do it anyway.
3	3	"Kayla Syndrome"	Jonathan Krisel	Brian Jordan Alvarez	September 9, 2024	XETV1004	0.092
A very revealing run-in with Harry at the gym convinces Evan that Harry is trying to flirt with him. This results in Evan dodging Harry throughout the week despite the two being paired to manage the Homecoming dance. Meanwhile, a student named Chelsea drums up sympathy for her friend Kayla, who is self-diagnosed with "asymptomatic Tourette's". Markie points out to Evan that this is just a ploy for Chelsea to gain popularity. At the dance, Kayla is crowned Homecoming Queen and gives the crown to Chelsea, securing her own popularity. Harry tries to speak with Evan, but Evan spirals and rejects him out of panic. Harry clarifies that, like Evan, he is in an open relationship with another man. He and Evan briefly kiss before Evan rejects him again.
4	4	"School Safety"	Jonathan Krisel	Brian Jordan Alvarez	September 16, 2024	XETV1005	0.116
Markie revives a student gun club to Evan's horror. He convinces his book club to stage a protest in an attempt to shut the gun club down, but they organize an identical counterprotest. Moretti claims his hands are tied and he cannot disband the club unless there is an active threat. Evan asks his class to write about heinous deeds they would do if they could get away with it. One student's essay is classified as an 'active threat' that shuts the club down, but the teachers are forced to take firearm training instead. Meanwhile, Gwen is dismayed at her low ranking on a list of the hottest teachers circulating among the students and tries dressing more glamorously. It is later revealed that one of Evan's students only created the list in a backhanded way to improve Gwen's wardrobe.
5	5	"Field Trip"	Brian Jordan Alvarez	Dave King	September 23, 2024	XETV1003	0.137
The teachers facilitate a camping field trip. Evan and Gwen are dogged by Sharon, a parent chaperone who is paranoid about the students playing sex games. Evan becomes jealous after learning Gwen invited Markie and Rick to help build her pool. Gwen admits that she does not think Evan is a helpful person and the two get into a fight. Markie tries to flirt with Gwen by giving her his night goggles, but Evan realizes they are latex (to which Gwen is allergic). Evan and Gwen reconcile.
6	6	"Linda"	Jonathan Krisel	Jake Bender & Zach Dunn	September 30, 2024	XETV1006	0.145
Evan issues failing grades to his class for their poor essays on The Red Badge of Courage, which incurs the wrath of Linda Harrison, the same wealthy and influential parent who previously reported him for kissing Malcolm. Grant forces Evan to meet with Linda; during the meeting at her restaurant Evan refuses to change the grades. Linda retaliates by bringing a school board employee to observe Evan's class and organizing a parent-teacher town hall to lambast Evan's teaching. Markie suggests proving that Linda's restaurant is committing tax fraud. Evan, wearing a wire, goes to meet with Linda, where she admits that she has tried to maintain her relationship with her older son but hides his homosexuality from her social circle. Evan allows the class to redo the essay. Meanwhile, Gwen attempts to catch her students cheating and falls through the ceiling doing so.
7	7	"Convention"	Kathryn Dean	Brian Jordan Alvarez & Jake Bender & Zach Dunn & Dave King	October 7, 2024	XETV1007	0.089
Evan, Gwen, Markie, Rick and Grant attend a teacher's conference in Dallas, where Evan and Gwen learn that Grant may be hiring a new teacher to replace Markie, and all the seminars seem to be about the dire state of teaching. Evan runs into Pasha, a friend from college who now works in the energy industry. Pasha offers to get Evan hired at his company, which Evan considers. However, Grant reminds him that teaching is what he loves. The next morning, Malcolm confronts Evan about his refusal to commit to an exclusive relationship and Evan declares they will solely be friends. Evan ditches Pasha's company after realizing they are making fun of Rick. Grant's keynote speech is a hit; afterwards Grant and Markie admit that Markie pretends to quit every year.
8	8	"Birthday"	Brian Jordan Alvarez	Brian Jordan Alvarez	October 14, 2024	XETV1008	0.090
Malcolm takes Evan to a gay bar for a surprise party for his 35th birthday. To Evan's embarrassment, his coworkers are in attendance, including Harry. Malcolm encourages Evan to sleep with Harry, who also comes on to Evan. Elsewhere in the bar, Markie contemplates making a move on Gwen, who has just broken up with Nick. Malcolm brings Harry up on stage and Markie encourages Evan to make a move on Harry. Evan goes up and kisses Malcolm, to Markie's surprise; the latter later declares that sometimes you have to let people be who they are. This encourages Gwen to get back together with Nick. The group eats burgers at Gwen and Nick's house where Malcolm and Evan kiss.

=== Season 2 (2025) ===
No. overall	No. in season	Title	Directed by	Written by	Original release date	Prod. code	U.S. viewers (millions)
9	1	"Covid in America"	Jonathan Krisel	Brian Jordan Alvarez	September 25, 2025	XETV2001	0.126
10	2	"Trash"	Jonathan Krisel	Jeremy Levick & Rajat Suresh	September 25, 2025	XETV2005	0.093
11	3	"Grant's Dinner Party"	Brian Jordan Alvarez	Stephanie Koenig	September 25, 2025	XETV2004	N/A
12	4	"College Week"	Michael McDonald	Emmy Blotnick	September 26, 2025 (Note: This episode first aired on FX on October 2, 2025.)	XETV2006	N/A
13	5	"Evan's Mom"	Jonathan Krisel	Jake Bender & Zach Dunn	September 26, 2025	XETV2003	N/A
14	6	"Recruiter"	Brian Jordan Alvarez	Dave King	September 26, 2025	XETV2002	N/A
Markie apparently becomes jealous when Evan befriends the army recruiter, Staff Sgt. Seth, that Rick invited to the school. Despite his aversion to the US military complex, Evan finds out that he has a lot in common with Seth. Markie is vindicated when Seth's obsession with the movie Looper leads to him acting erratically and it's revealed that he was dishonorably discharged from the army. Evan and Markie make up and plan on watching the DVD of Looper Seth gave Evan. Tired of students ignoring her lessons to be on their phones, Gwen institutes a no-phones policy that Evan adopts as well, which leads to problems when everyone misses a "Gray alert" about an elderly man lost on school property.
15	7	"Lake Trip"	Dave King	Brian Jordan Alvarez	September 26, 2025 (Note: This episode first aired on FX on October 9, 2025.)	XETV2008	N/A
While the others are administering a standardized test, Evan goes on a weekend getaway with Malcolm with a promise to not check-in with the others. However, Malcom becomes upset when he catches an antsy Evan calling Gwen and Markie for updates after all. Gwen and Grant struggle to administer the test to Chelsea, a student taking advantage of accommodations to avoid doing the test. Evan arrives and convinces Chelsea to take the test by appealing to her vanity. Meanwhile, Markie tries to dissuade Rick from taking the test to win a bet with a student, but eventually agrees to help him, which only worsens the situation.
16	8	"Accreditation"	Michael McDonald	Shana Gohd	September 26, 2025	XETV2007	N/A
The teachers are evaluated by outside accreditors in an effort to gain the school a better rating. Evan's old rival Linda returns to offer assistance as part of her own agenda. Gwen's evaluator turns out to be an ex that she ghosted and they end up rehashing the events that lead to their breakup. Evan refuses to use underhanded tactics to win over his evaluator that happens to be a motherless high school student, ruining Linda's careful planning in the process. The school retains its original rating, with the student evaluator explaining that they were never going to earn a higher placement without an ice skating rink.
17	9	"Lock In"	Kathryn Dean	Sam Johnson & Paul Simms	September 26, 2025 (Note: This episode first aired on FX on October 16, 2025.)	XETV2009	N/A
During the school's overnight lock-in sleepover, the kids come up with an unofficial scavenger hunt that horrifies the teachers. Gwen brings in Sharon to frighten them into behaving. Rick tries to get everyone to decide on the winners of the Academic Achievement Awards, leading to several stalemates that require Grant to intervene. Malcolm tries to talk to an exhausted Evan who dismisses his concerns about the lack of clarity in their relationship. Markie confesses to Evan about feeling alienated from his church, eventually taking him to a Sunday service where Evan realizes the problem is that the new pastor isn't speaking in English.
18	10	"Graduation"	Brian Jordan Alvarez	Brian Jordan Alvarez & Jake Bender & Zach Dunn & Dave King	September 26, 2025	XETV2010	N/A
As graduation nears, Evan worries about a student that he perceives is being bullied. He teams up with Gwen to help the student write a graduation speech that won't make him a laughing stock. Nick enlists a reluctant Markie to help him propose to Gwen at the ceremony. Grant offers Rick to be his vice principal, which he decides to decline in favor of pursuing his passions outside of school. The outsider student's graduation speech takes an unexpected turn, as he decides to make fun of the teachers, making it a roaring success. Despite failing to tell her how he feels again, Markie is still hopeful when Gwen expresses doubts after accepting the proposal. Evan initially plans to go to Berlin for the summer with Malcolm, but is convinced to do summer school with the other teachers instead. He comes home to find an airplane ticket with an accompanying letter in which Malcolm asks him to meet in Berlin if he still wants them to be together.

== Production ==
=== Development ===
In June 2022, it was announced FX had ordered the pilot, with Brian Jordan Alvarez set to serve as writer and executive producer, alongside Paul Simms. In November 2023, FX ordered the series. In February 2025, FX renewed the series for a second season. In November 2025, FX canceled the series after two seasons, following allegations that Alvarez had committed sexual assault against a cast member of another show of his, and that Koenig had enabled it.

=== Casting ===
Upon the initial announcement, Alvarez was set to star. In September 2022, Stephanie Koenig, Enrico Colantoni, and Julian Sergi joined the cast as series regulars, while Carmen Christopher, Jordan Firstman, Yissendy Trinidad, and Langston Kerman were set to recur. Sean Patton later replaced Sergi in the role of Markie Hillridge.

== Release ==
=== Broadcast ===
The first season of English Teacher premiered in the United States on FX on September 2, 2024. In Canada, the series aired on the linear FX channel, with Disney announcing that the first two episodes would debut on September 2, 2024, with episodes available the next day on Disney+. The second season premiered on FX on September 25, 2025, with three new episodes.

=== Streaming ===
Promotional poster

New episodes of English Teacher were made available to stream on Hulu following their FX premiere. The first two episodes were released on Hulu on September 3, 2024. Internationally, the series was made available for streaming on Disney+. All ten episodes of the second season were released on Hulu on September 26, 2025.

The streaming aggregator Reelgood, which tracks real-time data from 20 million U.S. users for original and acquired content across SVOD and AVOD services, reported that English Teacher was the eighth most-streamed program in the U.S. from August 29 through September 4, 2024. The series ranked No. 3 on Hulu's "Top 15 Today" list—a daily updated list of the platform's most-watched titles—on September 5. Reelgood later reported that English Teacher was the fourth most-streamed show for the week ending September 11, before moving to ninth place by the week ending September 14.

== Reception ==
=== Critical response ===
For the first season, review aggregator website Rotten Tomatoes reported a 98% approval rating, based on 44 critic reviews. The website's critics consensus reads, "English Teacher makes no bones about the drudgery of faculty life while never feeling like homework, making for a biting and buoyant schoolhouse sitcom." Metacritic gave the first season a weighted average score of 83 out of 100 based on 25 critic reviews, indicating "universal acclaim".

The second season has a 91% approval rating on Rotten Tomatoes, based on 11 critic reviews. On Metacritic, it has a weighted average score of 76 out of 100 based on 7 reviews, indicating "generally favorable" reviews.

=== Ratings ===
English Teacher premiered on September 2, 2024, with 212,000 total viewers (P2+) and a 0.07% rating, including 80,500 viewers aged 18–49 (0.06% rating), and 163,500 household viewers (0.13% rating). Subsequent episodes recorded 92,000 viewers on September 9 (0.03% rating), 116,000 on September 16 (0.04% rating), 137,000 on September 23 (0.04% rating), and 145,000 on September 30 (0.05% rating). In October 2024, viewership slightly declined, with 89,000 viewers on October 7 and 90,000 on October 14 (both 0.03% rating). The 18–49 demographic ranged from 26,500 to 80,500 viewers, and household ratings varied from 63,000 to 163,500 viewers during this period.

=== Accolades ===
Year	Award	Category	Nominee(s)	Result	Ref.
2025	Critics' Choice Television Awards	Best Comedy Series	English Teacher	Nominated	
2025	Critics' Choice Television Awards	Best Actor in a Comedy Series	Brian Jordan Alvarez	Nominated	
2025	Critics' Choice Television Awards	Best Supporting Actress in a Comedy Series	Stephanie Koenig	Nominated	
2025	Independent Spirit Awards	Best New Scripted Series	Brian Jordan Alvarez, Paul Simms, Jonathan Krisel, Dave King, Kathryn Dean, Jake Bender, and Zach Dunn	Nominated	
2025	Independent Spirit Awards	Best Lead Performance in a New Scripted Series	Brian Jordan Alvarez	Nominated	
2025	Independent Spirit Awards	Best Supporting Performance in a New Scripted Series	Enrico Colantoni	Nominated	
2025	Independent Spirit Awards	Best Supporting Performance in a New Scripted Series	Stephanie Koenig	Nominated	
2025	Satellite Awards	Best Comedy or Musical Series	English Teacher	Nominated	
2025	Television Critics Association Awards	Outstanding Achievement in Comedy	English Teacher	Nominated	
2025	Television Critics Association Awards	Outstanding New Program	English Teacher	Nominated	
