= Sean Patton (comedian) =

American comedian

- Born: New Orleans, Louisiana, U.S.
- Notable work: Sean Patton: Number One; English Teacher

Comedy career
- Medium: Stand-up; television
- Genres: Observational comedy; Storytelling
- Subjects: Family; mental health; American life
- Website: meseanpatton.com

Sean Patton is an American stand-up comedian and actor. He is best known for his stand-up specials on Comedy Central and Peacock, as well as his starring role on the FX comedy series English Teacher.

== Early life ==
Patton is from New Orleans, where he began performing stand-up comedy before relocating to New York.

== Career ==
=== Stand-up ===
Patton has performed at comedy festivals including Just for Laughs in Montreal, the Melbourne International Comedy Festival, the Sydney Comedy Festival, the Edinburgh Festival Fringe, SF Sketchfest, the Moontower Comedy Festival and South by Southwest. In 2018 he brought his show L.O.U.D. to the Soho Theatre in London, where Time Out described him as "a superb stand-up".

Patton's first full-length special, Sean Patton: Number One, was filmed at Tipitina's in New Orleans and premiered on Peacock on December 2, 2022; in it he discusses his upbringing, his family and his experience of obsessive–compulsive disorder. The special was later released on the 800 Pound Gorilla Media channel on YouTube.

In 2023 and 2024, Patton toured North America and beyond as the opening act on David Cross's "Worst Daddy in the World" tour.

=== Television ===
Patton's stand-up has been featured on Comedy Central's Live at Gotham and The Half Hour, and he has performed on Conan, Late Night with Jimmy Fallon and The Tonight Show Starring Jimmy Fallon. His other television appearances include @midnight, Inside Amy Schumer, Maron and HBO's Hacks.

Patton made multiple appearances as a storyteller on the Comedy Central series This Is Not Happening.

As a series regular, Patton played Markie Hillridge, a gym teacher and football coach, in the FX comedy series English Teacher. Patton said he recognized the character immediately, telling Collider that "there's a Markie in everyone's life"; he was performing stand-up in Manhattan when he was offered the audition.

== Discography ==
Year	Title
2019	Scuttlebutt
2021	King Scorpio
2023	Number One

== Filmography ==
=== Television ===
Year	Title	Role	Notes
2022	Sean Patton: Number One	Himself	Stand-up special
2024–2025	English Teacher	Markie Hillridge	Main role; seasons 1–2
