= Chris Eckert =

American actor, comedian and writer

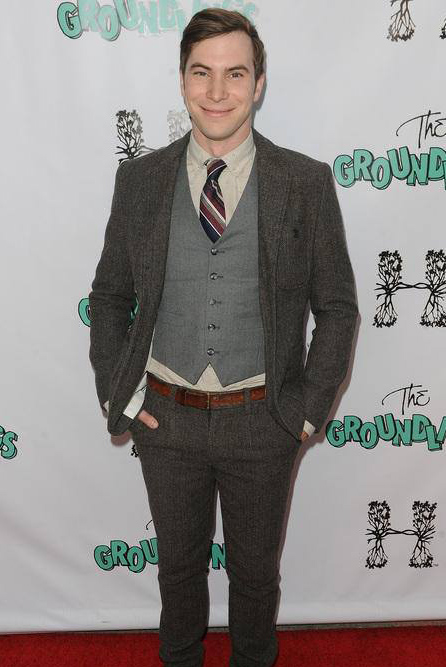
- Chris Eckert at Groundlings event.
- Born: February 22, 1986 (age 40); Oakland, California
- Education: American Academy of Dramatic Arts
- Occupations: Actor; comedian; writer
- Years active: 2009–present

Chris Eckert (born February 22, 1986) is an American actor, comedian and writer who is a current main company member of The Groundlings, and has appearances in shows such as Raising Hope, Super Fun Night, The Comeback, and Mad TV.

== Life and career ==
Chris Eckert was born in Oakland, California. He attended Hayward High School and graduated in 2004. He then attended and graduated from The American Academy Of Dramatic Arts. He is a member of The Groundlings, an improv and sketch comedy troupe based in Los Angeles. In 2015, Eckert starred in a campaign for Fiat and NBCUniversal opposite Bobby Moynihan. Eckert is the grandson of decorated British officer Sandy Smith.

=== Television ===
Year	Title	Role	Notes
2009	Mad TV	Nick Jonas	Episode: #14.12
2012	Raising Hope	Jordon	Episode: "Don't Ask Don't Tell Me What To Do"
2014	Super Fun Night	Carl	Episode: "Hostile Makeover"
2014	The Comeback	Groundling No. 1	Episode: "Valerie Saves The Show"
2016	Go-Go Boy Interrupted	Jonathan	3 episodes
2023-2025	Ghosts	George	2 episodes
