= Mika Abdalla =

American actress (born 2000)

- Abdalla in 2026
- Born: Mikayla Sofia Abdalla; May 13, 2000 (age 26); Plano, Texas, U.S.
- Education: University of California, Los Angeles (BA)
- Occupation: Actress
- Years active: 2008–present
- Known for: Project Mc², Off Campus

Mikayla Sofia Abdalla (born May 13, 2000) is an American actress. She is best known for her starring roles in the Netflix series Project Mc² (2015–2017) and the Amazon Prime Video series Off Campus (2026–present). Her other notable films include the Hulu comedy Sex Appeal (2022) and Snack Shack (2024).

== Early life and education ==
Mikayla Sofia Abdalla was born in Plano, Texas, on 13 May 2000 and raised in Dallas. A first-generation American, Abdalla is of Bulgarian, Lebanese, Greek, Italian, and German descent.

From the age of five, Abdalla wanted to act and perform. In an interview with Rollacoster magazine, Abdalla stated, "I loved the attention I got doing print work [modelling or still photo work] in Dallas, so I was like obsessed with continuing to be on set." Abdalla attended Spring Creek Academy, which allowed her to complete schoolwork at odd hours and accommodated her acting schedule. After graduating from high school a year early, she considered Texas A&M University, University of Texas at Austin, and Southern Methodist University, before ultimately deciding to attend University of California, Los Angeles (UCLA). She graduated with a bachelor's degree in philosophy.

== Career ==
=== 2008-2025: Early work ===
Abdalla made her acting debut in 2008, performing as Jill on the television show Barney & Friends at the age of 8. She made an appearance in the film An American Girl: Saige Paints the Sky, where she played Dylan Patterson. She also appeared in films such as The Fandango Sisters (2012), Departure (2012), and Summer's Shadow (2014).

In 2015, Abdalla gained wider attention for her role as Mckeyla McAlister in the Netflix original series Project Mc². She would spend 11 hours a day on set for five days a week and fit schoolwork around her scenes. The series ran for six seasons before concluding in 2017, the year Abdalla graduated from high school.

After Project Mc² ended, Abdalla's acting career stalled. In her interview with Rollacoster magazine, she stated that, "when I was around 18, my career went through a lull that sucked so bad." Despite the break, she continued, "I feel like the yearning for expression made me realize how much I really want to do this forever." During the break, she attended college at UCLA.

In 2022, Abdalla starred alongside Jake Short as Avery Hansen-White in the Hulu original film Sex Appeal. Later that year, she played Tinya Wazzo in The Flash.

Abdalla also starred in Snack Shack (2024). She described her character as "the most similar" to herself that she has portrayed.

=== 2025-present: Breakthrough ===
In 2025, Abdalla had roles in The Pitt and Suits LA.

In 2026, Abdalla starred as Allie Hayes in Off Campus, an Amazon Prime Video series based on Elle Kennedy's novel series. The series reached 36 million viewers in its first 12 days of streaming, making it the third most-watched series launch in Prime Video's history. Abdalla received critical praise for her performance. Amazon Prime Video renewed the series for a second season ahead of the series premiere and announced that the central couple of the second season is set to be Allie and her love interest Dean.

== Personal life ==
As a child, Abdalla participated in competitive ballroom dancing and equestrianism.

Abdalla has credited Jennifer Lawrence and Leonardo DiCaprio as her primary influences on her acting. "She’s not afraid to speak her mind or share her opinion," she stated of Lawrence, while DiCaprio "puts so much into every role and researches a lot to prepare."

Abdalla became engaged to actor Jake Short in 2025. The two met on the set of the Hulu comedy Sex Appeal. In June 2026, a representative confirmed that the couple had ended their engagement.

In mid-2026, it was confirmed by a representative that Abdalla was in a relationship with Australian actor Josh Heuston. The two met on the set of Off Campus.

== Filmography ==
=== Film ===
Year	Title	Role	Notes	Ref(s)
2010	The Fandango Sisters	Lil' Jackie		
2012	Tinsel	Young Sarah		
2012	Departure	Evelyn	Short film	
2012	A Woman's Worth	Sade Thomas		
2012	Hemera's Eclipse	Hemera	Short film	
2013	An American Girl: Saige Paints the Sky	Dylan Patterson	Television film	
2014	Summer's Shadow	Vanessa		
2015	Shattered Reflections	Young Kaitlin	Short film	
2017	The Violet	Oona		
2019	Warpaint for the Teenage Soul	Layla	Short film	
2022	Sex Appeal	Avery Hansen-White		
2024	Snack Shack	Brooke		

=== Television ===
Year	Title	Role	Notes	Ref(s)
2008	Barney & Friends	Jill	Episode: "A Game for Everyone: A Sports Adventure"	
2010	Fun to Grow On	Self	3 episodes	
2015–2017	Project Mc²	McKeyla McAlister	Main role, 26 episodes	
2020	S.W.A.T.	Zoey	Episode: "Hopeless Sinners"	
2022	The Flash	Tinya Wazzo	5 episodes	
2025	The Pitt	Jenna	4 episodes	
2025	Suits LA	Sierra Carson	2 episodes	
2026–present	Off Campus	Allie Hayes	Main role, 8 episodes	

=== Audio ===
Year	Title	Role	Notes
2026	Rent Free	Nora	Main role

== Accolades ==
Awards	Year	Category	Work	Result
Young Artist Award	2016	Best Performance in a TV Series – Leading Young Actress (14–21)	Project Mc²	Nominated
Young Artist Award	2016	Outstanding Young Ensemble Cast in a Web or VOD Series	Project Mc²	Nominated
