= An American Girl: Saige Paints the Sky =

- DVD poster
- Based on: Saige Paints the Sky by Jessie Haas
- Screenplay by: Jessica O'Toole; Amy Rardin
- Directed by: Vince Marcello
- Starring: Sidney Fullmer; Jane Seymour; Alex Peters; Alana Gordillo; Mika Abdalla; Kerr Smith
- Music by: Patrick Kirst
- Country of origin: United States
- Original language: English

Production
- Producers: Steven Brown; Debra Martin Chase; Jean McKenzie
- Cinematography: Jon Joffin
- Editor: Paul Millspaugh
- Running time: 100 minutes
- Production companies: Universal Studios; Martin Chase Productions; Pinckney Productions

Original release
- Network: NBC
- Release: July 2, 2013

An American Girl: Saige Paints the Sky is a 2013 American drama film and the seventh film in the American Girl series, introducing newcomer Sidney Fullmer in the title role, as well as Kerr Smith, Jane Seymour, Alex Peters, Alana Gordillo and Mika Abdalla.

The film tells the story of Saige Copeland, an aspiring young artist from Albuquerque, New Mexico. As with the previous film, the screenplay was written by Jessica O'Toole and Amy Rardin. The movie was directed by Vince Marcello.

A screening of the film was held at the KiMo Theatre in Albuquerque.

== Plot ==
Nine-year-old artist Saige Copeland begins her first day of fourth grade in Albuquerque, New Mexico, only to learn that the art class has been dropped from the school's curriculum due to budget cuts, and will be cycled with music. Saige's best friend Tessa Jablonsky, a musician, befriended another girl named Dylan Patterson at summer camp and hangs out with her instead, making Saige jealous. A new girl in school named Gabi Peña, who is also an artist, becomes friends with Saige. Saige tells her grandmother, whom she calls Mimi, about the situation, and Mimi proposes a school-wide protest against the art class removal. Saige also works to reconnect with Tessa.

Later, Mimi trips over Saige's dog, Rembrandt, and is hospitalized for a broken leg and wrist. At the hospital, she encourages Saige to continue on with her protest. At school, Saige tells Tessa, Gabi and Dylan (who was invited by Tessa) her protest plan, "A Day of Beige", inspired by her visit to the hospital. Dylan suggests a press conference in order to gain more attention since her mother works as a news reporter, to which Saige reluctantly agrees. The demonstrations are held as planned with all of the students wearing beige, but is nearly put to a halt as Saige and her friends are summoned to the principal's office. After an explanation, Principal Laird gives the girls the permission to hold the press conference. Upon being interviewed, Saige is overwhelmed with stage fright and leaves, so Dylan answers the reporters' questions in her place.

Principal Laird later informs the girls that there aren't anymore funds to hire an art teacher, and they would need to earn $5,000 in six weeks for the art class to start this year. Mimi suggests a fund drive to be held at the Albuquerque International Balloon Fiesta, and to have her granddaughter lead the annual parade in her place as she may not make it in time for the event. Saige worries about her stage fright despite her family and trainer Luis' assurances. The four girls take up various odd jobs to earn funds, but are largely unsuccessful. Dylan suggests a concert at the fiesta and they can split between art and music, which Saige has doubts about.

Later at the ranch, Saige and her horse Picasso do a practice run for the parade, but she struggles to concentrate. Meanwhile, Saige and Gabi are worried that Dylan and Tessa's part for the fundraiser is getting more attention than theirs. Saige and Picasso do another run at the ranch, this time with success as they manage to pull off a gait without being distracted. At Mimi's ranch, Saige and Gabi bond. After Rembrandt knocks over Saige's painting, she gets an idea.

At school, Saige and Gabi propose combining their efforts in the fundraiser. Dylan and Tessa argue that they have their plans already set, but Saige disagrees, leading to a confrontation. Saige claims that the Tessa she knows would agree with her before launching into a furious tirade towards Dylan, accusing her of stealing the spotlight over her efforts, for which she is rejected by Tessa.

Saige tries to talk Mimi into doing artwork or coming to the parade, but Mimi doesn't think she can. Saige gets upset and confesses that the arrangements are worse than she has been admitting, but also that the Mimi she knows wouldn't give up, before running off. Another practice run with Picasso takes place, but when her parents and Gabi show up, Saige is too frustrated to continue. She worries that the fiesta is going to be a disaster and she doesn't have anymore fundraising ideas. Gabi leaves when Saige blurts out that she wants things to be the same as the year before.

During a hot air balloon ride, Saige's father advises her about accepting change. She later reconciles with Gabi, and apologizes to Mimi. After her horse practice, Saige goes to Mimi's studio and decides to paint over her horse painting with a painting knife, turning it into an abstract work. Tessa arrives, and both girls admit to their mistakes and reconcile, agreeing to work together for the fiesta. Saige gets an idea to use Mimi's unfinished mural for the concert. She also makes amends with Dylan, with the latter apologizing over how she was taking over Saige's fundraiser.

With the Balloon Fiesta taking place, Saige leads the parade in front of onlookers. She is nervous at first, but eventually overcomes her fears. The girls later put on a joint fund-raising art exhibit and concert as previously planned. The show is a success, but the school is short of the $5,000 goal. Saige then makes a speech in front of the audience about how important art is to her and to others, which pushes for some extra money to be put into the fundraiser from them. The donation goal is reached, with the art program being reinstated.

Back at the hot air balloon show, Saige, Tessa, Gabi, and Dylan (now all best friends) ride a hot air balloon Saige designed as the film ends.

== Cast ==
- Sidney Fullmer as Saige Copeland, a 9-year-old girl who has a passion for art. Although she is very good at what she loves, she has major stage fright.
- Jane Seymour as Miriam "Mimi" Copeland, Saige's paternal grandmother who also has a passion for art. She is the one who inspired Saige to become an artist.
- Alex Peters as Tessa Jablonsky, Saige's best friend since kindergarten who loves music. Over the summer, she went to music camp, and had gotten closer with Dylan.
- Alana Gordillo as Gabi Peña, a new girl in town who quickly becomes close friends with Saige. She also loves art, but aside from that, she is a big animal-lover.
- Mika Abdalla as Dylan Patterson, Tessa's bossy new friend whom she met at music camp. She also loves music and is an incredible singer and songwriter.
- Kerr Smith as David Copeland, Saige's father who is a pilot. One of his main hobbies is flying hot air balloons.
- Rebecca Gibson as Principal Laird, the principal of Mesa Grande Elementary School. Even though the school can't afford it, she agrees that art and music are very important.
- Laurel Harris as Marina Copeland, Saige's mother who is a math professor at a local university. She is very supportive of Saige's fight to get the art program back.
- Omar Paz Trujillo as Luis, Mimi's neighbor who loves riding horses. He enjoys riding with Saige and teaching her new skills.

== Production ==
An American Girl: Saige Paints the Sky was filmed in New Mexico, USA and Winnipeg, Manitoba, Canada.

== Release ==
The film aired on NBC on July 13, 2013. It was released on DVD + Blu-ray on July 2, 2013.

== See also ==
- List of films about horses
