= Sex Appeal (2022 film) =

2022 film directed by Talia Osteen

- Release poster
- Directed by: Talia Osteen
- Written by: Tate Hanyok
- Produced by: Jeremy Garelick; Ryan Bennett; Mark Fasano; Mickey Liddell; Will Phelps; Pete Shilaimon; Tobias Weymar
- Starring: Mika Abdalla; Jake Short
- Cinematography: Sherri Kauk
- Edited by: Gennady Fridman
- Music by: Jeffrey Brodsky
- Production company: American High
- Distributed by: Hulu
- Release date: January 14, 2022
- Running time: 90 minutes
- Country: United States
- Language: English

Sex Appeal (stylized as SexAPPeal) is a 2022 American teen sex comedy film directed by Talia Osteen (in her feature-length directorial debut) and written by Tate Hanyok. The film stars Mika Abdalla, Jake Short, Margaret Cho, Paris Jackson and Fortune Feimster.

== Premise ==
Avery Hansen-White holds herself back from doing things she's not excellent at. So when her long-distance boyfriend seems to want to take their relationship to the next level at the upcoming STEM conference ("nerd prom"), she resolves to master her sexuality. Avery starts studying the mechanics of love and realizes that relationships involve less science and more heart.

== Cast ==
- Mika Abdalla as Avery
- Jake Short as Larson
- Fortune Feimster as Mama Suze
- Paris Jackson as Danica McCollum
- Margaret Cho as Ma Deb
- Rebecca Henderson as Ma Kim
- Artemis Pebdani as Ms. Carlson
- Hayden Szeto as Mr. Vemmer
- Daniela Nieves as Lyssa
- Mason Versaw as Casper
- Joshua Colley as Tristan

== Production ==
In March 2021, it was revealed that American High was developing a teen comedy film for Hulu called Sex Appeal, with Mika Abdalla and Jake Short set to star. The same month, it was reported that Talia Osteen would direct the film in her directorial debut for Hulu, while Tate Hanyok would serve as the screenwriter and one of the executive producers. In April 2021, Margaret Cho, Paris Jackson, Rebecca Henderson, and Skai Jackson were announced to star in the film. Filming took place in and around Syracuse, New York, including at Syracuse Studios, in the village of Liverpool, and Onondaga Lake Park.

== Release ==
The film was released on January 14, 2022, on Hulu. Internationally, the movie became available through Disney+ starting on April 8, 2022. In Latin America, the film was released as a Star+ original on March 18, 2022.

== Reception ==
On the review aggregator website Rotten Tomatoes, 55% of 20 critics' reviews are positive, with an average rating of 5.90/10.

Jennifer Green of Common Sense Media gave the film a grade of three out of five stars and praised the positive message of the movie on romantic relationships, while complimenting the diversity of the cast. Aurora Amidon of Paste rated the movie 5.8 out of 10, praised how the movie approaches the loss of virginity with humor, but found the lack of knowledge of sex of Mika Abdalla's character nonsensical due to her mastery on science and the presence of her sex-positive parents.

Ferdosa of Screen Rant rated the film two out of five stars, complimented that the movie manages to deliver a positive take on sexual relationships, while praising the performance of Abdalla, but stated that the film does not develop the characters enough through their dialogues compared to other teen sex comedy movies.
