= Sick Girl (2023 film) =

American film by Jennifer Cram

- Film poster
- Directed by: Jennifer Cram
- Written by: Jennifer Cram
- Produced by: Sean McEwen; Jessica Wilde; Cassidy Lunnen; John Papsidera
- Starring: Nina Dobrev; Brandon Mychal Smith; Sherry Cola; Stephanie Koenig; Hayley Magnus; Ray McKinnon; Dan Bakkedahl; Wendi McLendon-Covey
- Cinematography: Ante Cheng
- Edited by: Collin Pittier; Monica Salazar; Joshua Salzberg
- Music by: Patrick Stump
- Production companies: Grindstone Entertainment; Whereabouts Unknown; Red Clay Studios
- Distributed by: Lionsgate
- Release date: October 20, 2023
- Country: United States
- Language: English

Sick Girl is a 2023 American comedy film written and directed by Jennifer Cram and starring Nina Dobrev, Brandon Mychal Smith, Sherry Cola, Stephanie Koenig, Hayley Magnus, Ray McKinnon, Dan Bakkedahl, and Wendi McLendon-Covey. It marks Cram's feature directorial debut. Dobrev serves as an executive producer of the film. It received negative reviews from critics.

== Plot ==
Wren Pepper is a 30-something party gal who works as a cashier at a stationery store. All of her friends since her teenage years are at different stages in their lives: Laurel is focused on competitive marathons and a new relationship, Cece is raising her young daughter, and Jill is busy with her new toddler and a bickering husband. Hoping to reunite the friend circle, Wren tells a white lie that she has cancer. The lie spirals out of control when her friends go above and beyond to support Wren, placing her in awkward situations where she’s forced to lie to the public, her parents, and an actual cancer patient she befriends at a support group, named Leo.

== Cast ==
- Nina Dobrev as Wren Pepper
- Brandon Mychal Smith as Leo
- Sherry Cola as Laurel
- Stephanie Koenig as Cece
- Hayley Magnus as Jill
- Ray McKinnon as Malcolm
- Dan Bakkedahl as Fred Pepper
- Wendi McLendon-Covey as Carol Pepper
- Randy Wayne as Derek

== Production ==
Filming occurred in Oklahoma. In August 2019, it was announced that filming wrapped. The COVID-19 pandemic served as a factor as to why the film was in post-production for more than three years. Patrick Stump serves as composer of the film, making it his first film score.

== Release ==
The film was released in theaters and on digital platforms in the United States on October 20, 2023.

== Reception ==
On the review aggregator website Rotten Tomatoes, 38% of 13 critics' reviews are positive, with an average rating of 5.9/10.

Bobby Lepire of Film Threat said that despite its flaws, the film "does work," calling it a "solid debut."

Peter Gray of The Au Review wrote that "Sick Girl is an enjoyable bout of bad taste with just enough heart so we can forgive ourselves for enjoying so."

Pete Hammond of Deadline gave the film a negative review and wrote, "If you are going to do a so-called 'hilarious' comedy dealing with cancer you better know how to do it. Unfortunately, writer/director Jennifer Cram, for her first feature film in those jobs, does not knock it out of the park."

Courtney Howard of Variety also gave the film an unfavorable review and wrote, "On paper, it contains admirable notions about adult female friendships and the need to maintain that vital bond. In execution, however, those stirring sentiments are tested by taxing hijinks."
