= Go-Go Boy Interrupted =

American web series

- Genre: Web series; LGBT; Comedy
- Created by: Jimmy Fowlie
- Written by: Jimmy Fowlie
- Directed by: Jordan Black
- Starring: Jimmy Fowlie; Drew Droege; Lynne Marie Stewart; Mitch Silpa
- Country of origin: United States
- Original language: English
- No. of seasons: 2
- No. of episodes: 21

Production
- Cinematography: Nathan Warburton
- Editor: Mike Carrier
- Running time: 3-5 minutes

Original release
- Network: YouTube
- Release: October 7, 2014 – July 5, 2016

Go-Go Boy Interrupted is an LGBT-themed comedy web series that premiered on YouTube in October 2014. Adapted from a Groundlings sketch comedy act of the same name, the series stars and was created by Jimmy Fowlie. It chronicles the adventures of Danny Carter, a 30-year-old "washed up" male go-go dancer. Fowlie commented on each of the first seven episodes via a column at HuffPost as they were released.

== Overview ==
In the series, Fowlie portrays Danny Carter, a 30-year-old "washed up" male go-go dancer who "must discover a way to find his 'purpose' and survive within a different lifestyle as he moves on from go-going." Based on Fowlie's experience as a go-go dancer in West Hollywood while attending the University of Southern California, the series asks the question, "What happens next after a go-go boy ages out of his profession?" Fowlie told HuffPost in 2014:

In college I had worked as a go-go boy at this really popular club — and it was such an interesting world with outrageous characters: larger than life drag queens and 19-year-old party boys ... it just got me thinking — what happens when the party is over and someone can't leave? Dancing at a club doesn't give you any "real world skills". In other words, just like my degree in theater, it is worthless. When gay guys are using their youth and sexuality as currency, what happens when you get "aged out" of your career?

Fowlie first performed Go-Go Boy Interrupted in June 2014 as a live sketch comedy show at The Groundlings. According to Fowlie, the show continued with four months of sold-out shows, and he adapted it into a web series. The live version is ongoing, with periodic performances scheduled through 2015.

== Cast ==
- Jimmy Fowlie as Danny Carter (Seasons 1–2)
- Drew Droege as Ann Ziety, Danny's boss at Club Pantherwarmth (Seasons 1–2)
- Lynne Marie Stewart as Danny's Mom (Seasons 1–2)
- Brian Jordan Alvarez as Eliot, a go-go dancer (Seasons 1–2)
- Navaris Dawson as James, a go-go dancer (Seasons 1–2)
- Dakota Greene as Ricky, a go-go dancer (Seasons 1–2)
- Jacob Matthews as Chris, a go-go dancer (Seasons 1–2)
- Scott Evans as himself (Seasons 1–2)
- Dillon Field as Chad, Scott's friend (Seasons 1–2)
- Mitch Silpa as Rich, Danny's one night stand (Season 1)
- Tessa Goss as Andrea, a mother of two (Season 1)
- Nico Santos as Nick, Danny's friend (Season 1)
- Jordan Black as Cashew, a homeless man (Season 2)
- Henry McMillan as Martin, Scott's friend (Season 2)
- Heather Morris as Katie, a go-go dancer (Season 2)
- Willam Belli as Willam, the new manager of Club Pantherwarmth (Season 2)
- Nick Adams as Keith (Season 2)
- Fortune Feimster as Fortune, a doorperson (Season 2)
- Chris Eckert as Jonathan, Danny's brother (Season 2)
- Karen Maruyama as Liz (Season 2)
- Briga Heelan as Ashley, Danny's ex-girlfriend (Season 2)
- Chris Riggi as Taylor (Season 2)
- Katie O'Brien as Krista, Danny's sister (Season 2)
- Jessica Perlman as Jazz the Makeup Girl (Season 2)
- Pablo Hernandez as Pablo, a go-go dancer (Season 2)
- John Suazo as Big Rod, a go-go dancer (Season 2)
- Katrina Kemp as Katrina (Season 2)

== Episodes ==
=== Season 1 (2014) ===
No. overall	No. in season	Title	Original release date	Length
1	1	"Danny and the Dirty 30"	October 7, 2014	5:03
Thirty-year-old go-go boy Danny Carter finds that he has aged out of the business. Guest: Drew Droege as Ann Ziety.
2	2	"Birthday Black Out Surprise"	October 14, 2014	3:35
Danny wakes up with a sexy stranger in his bed. Guest: Lynne Marie Stewart as Danny's Mom.
3	3	"It's NOT Confidential"	October 21, 2014	2:52
Danny looks to escape his troubles at the gym. Guest: Scott Evans.
4	4	"How to Exit Gracefully After a One Night Stand"	October 27, 2014	2:58
Danny tries to escape his latest blackout trick. Guest: Mitch Silpa as Rich.
5	5	"Don't Tell Mom the Babysitter's Drunk"	November 4, 2014	3:45
Danny interviews for a job as a babysitter. Guest: Tessa Goss as Andrea.
6	6	"How to Handle Drama in the Workplace"	November 10, 2014	3:24
Danny returns to work at Club Pantherwarmth. Guest: Drew Droege as Ann Ziety.
7	7	"A Spiritual Awakening (sort of)"	November 18, 2014	3:57
Danny faces the fact that he is jobless, friendless and no longer in his 20s.

=== Season 2 (2016) ===
No. overall	No. in season	Title	Original release date	Length
8	1	"Lunch Shift Go-Go Boy"	April 12, 2016	5:11
A newly sober Danny is a lunchtime go-go boy at Club Twerk. Guest: Scott Evans as himself, Dillon Field as Chad, Henry McMillan as Martin and Jordan Black as Cashew.
9	2	"Pantherwarmth Blues"	April 12, 2016	4:52
Danny returns to Pantherwarmth in hopes of getting his old job back, but the club is under intense new management. Guest: Willam Belli as Willam.
10	3	"Am I Masc? (...No)"	April 19, 2016	3:49
Danny gets to know the new dancers at Pantherwarmth. Guest: Heather Morris as Katie.
11	4	"Drag Queen Dilemmas"	April 26, 2016	6:57
Danny talks his way in to see Ann. Guests: Drew Droege as Ann Ziety, Fortune Feimster as Fortune and Pablo Hernandez as himself.
12	5	"To Do Porn or Not to Do Porn"	May 2, 2016	4:44
Danny seeks the advice of his friends and family as to whether or not he should do porn. Guests: Lynne Marie Stewart as Danny's Mom and Katie O'Brien as Krista, Danny's sister.
13	6	"My First Time Doing Porn"	May 10, 2016	6:37
Danny goes to work on a porn film. Guests: Karen Maruyama as Liz, Jessica Perlman as Jazz the Makeup Girl and Sean Murphy as Thumper.
14	7	"How to Survive a Gay Pool Party"	May 17, 2016	5:45
Danny and his friends attend a gay pool party. Guests: Nick Adams as Keith, Heather Morris as Katie and Lynne Marie Stewart as Danny's Mom.
15	8	"When You Befriend Mean Gays"	May 23, 2016	3:17
Danny is welcomed by Scott Evans and his Mean Gays. Guests: Scott Evans as himself, Dillon Field as Chad and Henry McMillan as Martin.
16	9	"When You Tell Your Girlfriend You're Gay"	May 31, 2016	6:12
Danny is reunited with his high school girlfriend. Guests: Briga Heelan as Ashley, Drew Droege as Ann Ziety and Willam Belli as Willam.
17	10	"How to Tell If He's the One"	June 6, 2016	2:24
Danny worries about Keith seeing him dancing at the club. Guest: Heather Morris as Katie.
18	11	"My Worst Gay Pride"	June 13, 2016	3:27
Danny is less than thrilled about his Pride costume for Club Pantherwarmth. Guest: Drew Droege as Ann Ziety.
19	12	"Gay Advice. We Need to Talk ... About Me"	June 21, 2016	4:01
Danny asks the other dancers for advice.
20	13	"First Date Gone Wrong"	June 28, 2016	4:53
Danny has a date with Keith. Guests: Nick Adams as Keith and Lynne Marie Stewart as Danny's Mom.
21	14	"Facing Your Bullies"	July 5, 2016	9:38
Danny faces his enemies on the dodgeball court. Guests: Jordan Black as Cashew, Drew Droege as Ann Piety, and Katie O'Brien as Krista.

== Production and broadcast ==
Go-Go Boy Interrupted premiered on YouTube in October 2014. Fowlie commented on each of the first seven episodes via a column at HuffPost as they were released.

A Kickstarter crowdfunding campaign ending in October 2015 was established to fund a potential second season, and 450 contributors raised $69,033 for the project. Towleroad reported in September 2015 that Droege, Stewart and Evans would return alongside new additions including Heather Morris, Briga Heelan, Chris Riggi, Willam Belli, Nick Adams, Karen Maruyama and Fortune Feimster.

Season 2 premiered on April 12, 2016, with a new episode following on each Tuesday for 14 weeks.

== Reception ==
Daniel Reynolds of The Advocate praised Go-Go Boy Interrupted as "hilarious" and "uproarious", and Sean Mandell of Towleroad called the series "irreverent". TheGayUK called it "wonderfully hilarious" and a "delightfully entertaining slice of West Hollywood gay life."

The series won the 2017 Queerty Award for Best Web Series.
