= Jimmy Fowlie =

American actor, writer and comedian

- Born: Boston, Massachusetts, U.S.
- Occupations: Actor, writer, comedian
- Years active: 2008–present

Jimmy Fowlie (/ˈfaʊli/) is an American actor, writer and comedian who publishes YouTube content. Formerly of The Groundlings, he produced Go-Go Boy Interrupted, an LGBT-themed comedy web series based on his live sketch comedy show of the same name. He is also known for writing and performing as Emma Stone's La La Land character in the one-woman Off-Broadway show So Long Boulder City.

== Career ==
Fowlie appeared on Jimmy Kimmel Live!, The Joe Schmo Show, and online shorts by CollegeHumor and Nacho Punch. He appeared on HBO's The Comeback in 2014, and is a participant in the CBS Diversity Showcase.

Fowlie began performing with The Groundlings around 2012, later teaching improv with the troupe. Starting in June 2014 he began performing Go-Go Boy Interrupted, an LGBT-themed sketch comedy show, at The Groundlings theater. A few months later he adapted the show into a web series first shown on YouTube in October 2014. It chronicles the adventures of Danny Carter, a 30-year-old "washed up" male go-go dancer, based on Fowlie's own experiences as a go-go dancer in West Hollywood while attending the University of Southern California. The live version of Go-Go Boy Interrupted continued in 2015.

Fowlie also co-wrote and performed the one-woman Off-Broadway show So Long Boulder City, based on the fictional show created by Emma Stone's character Mia Dolan in the 2016 film La La Land. Co-written and directed by Jordan Black, So Long Boulder City was performed in Los Angeles before its six-month run at the SubCulture Off-Broadway theater in New York City.

He is a contributor to The Huffington Post.

Fowlie was hired as a writer for Saturday Night Live in 2022, at the beginning of the show's 48th season.

== Personal life ==
Fowlie is a native of Bedford, Massachusetts, outside of Boston, where he graduated from Walnut Hill School. He majored in theatre at the University of Southern California in Los Angeles. Fowlie is gay.

Fowlie's sister, Christina, went missing and was last seen in Los Angeles in November 2025. He asked for help finding her by posting on Instagram. Fellow SNL cast members Bowen Yang and Sarah Sherman shared her missing person report. Although Fowlie has stated on his Instagram that the LAPD told him Christina was no longer alive, the LAPD has contradicted this in the press and has stated that the case remains classified as a missing persons case.

== Filmography ==
=== Film ===
Year	Title	Role	Notes
2008	Ted White Knockleby Pursues the American Dream	Ted White Knockelby	Short film
2009	Mr. Sadman	Punk kid 3	
2012	Jason Russell talks Kony 2012	Jason Russell	Short film
2012	Cakes	Maegan	Short film
2012	Charlie's Gayngels	Adam	Short film
2013	McDonald's Prank	Reece	Short film
2013	What U Wanna Hear	Liam	CollegeHumor short
2014	An LA Douchebag Romance		Short film
2014	Nacho Punch	Seasonal Employee	Short: Black Friday – Movie Trailer
2015	Ryan Gosling Responds to Haters	Ryan Gosling	Short film
2015	Friday Night with Crystal	Police Officer	Short film
2015	What Really Happens at Chaz Dean's Salon	Chaz Dean	Short film
2016	When You're the Ugliest 1 of Your Squad	Maegan	Short film
2017	God Is Real	Religious Character	Short film
2017	Everything Is Free	Charlie	
2017	Unlovable	James	
2020	Dusty	Scott	Short film
2026	Roommates	Señor Michaels	Also co-producer and writer

=== Television ===
Year	Title	Role	Notes
2011	Jimmy Kimmel Live!	Various	Episode: "Game Night 5"
2013	The Joe Schmo Show	Priest	Episode: "The Rise of the Lamas"
2013	Youth Pastor Kevin	Shared Saves Wall	Web series
2013	Ask a Slave	Jayson Anderson	Web series; episode: "You Can't Make This Stuff Up"
2014	Somewhere in Palm Springs	Jill	Web series; 2 episodes
2014	The Glass Slipper Confessionals	Prince Charming	Web series; 3 episodes
2014	The Comeback	Rick	Episode: "Valerie Saves the Show"
2014–2016	Go-Go Boy Interrupted	Danny Carter	Web series; 21 episodes
2015	2 Broke Girls	Maurizio	Episode: "And the Knock Off Knockout"
2015	JustBoobs	Bobby	Episode: "Life Hackz: Grindr"
2016	The Gay and Wondrous Life of Caleb Gallo	Chris	Episode: "1.1"
2016	Teachers	Sommelier	Episode: "Bad Tweeter"
2016	Bizaardvark	Angelo	Episode: "First!"
2016	Tween Fest	Jason Tyler Justin-Austin	Episode: "Tween Fest Begins"
2016	Totally Yourself on Prince Charming	Himself	Web series; 3 episodes
2017	Nasty Queen	Colby	Web series; 2 episodes
2017	Tight	Edmond 'Chilli' Scott	Episode: "Pilot"
2017	The Journey of Being Likable	Timmy	Web series
2019	Liza on Demand	Felix	Episode: "Naked"
2019–2023	The Other Two	Cameron Colby	4 episodes; also executive story editor
2020	Sex and the City in 2020	Carrie Bradshaw	Web series
2021	Good Girls	St. Anne's Parent	Episode: "Big Kahuna"
2021	Bridesman	Terry	Web series; 6 episodes
2022	Search Party	Dogey	Episode: "Leviticus"
2022	The Goldbergs	Frank	Episode: "Rhinestones and Roses"
2024	Kiff	Tyler / Tarryn Plue (voice)	Episode: "The Haunting of Miss McGravy's House"
2024–2025	English Teacher	Daniel Clarkson	5 episodes

=== Music videos ===
Year	Title	Role	Notes
2017	"No Trump"	Himself	

=== Theatre ===
Year	Title	Role	Notes
2017	So Long Boulder City	Mia Dolan	Off-Broadway play
