= Ken Kirby =

Canadian actor

- Born: Vancouver, British Columbia, Canada
- Occupations: Actor, screenwriter
- Years active: 2006–present

Ken Kirby is a Canadian actor and screenwriter. He has played the recurring characters Dr. John Shen on HBO Max's The Pitt, Ben on Freeform's Good Trouble, Evan Tate in The CW series Dynasty, and Lenjamin McButtons in the LGBTQ web series The Gay and Wondrous Life of Caleb Gallo. Kirby has also appeared in the independent film Straight Up, Fox's The Gifted, and Freeform's Famous in Love.

== Early life and education ==
Kirby was born in Vancouver to a British father and a Chinese mother. He grew up between Canada, Hong Kong, and Shanghai. Kirby studied business in college.

Kirby, who has a passion for comedy, decided that he wanted to entertain people professionally after 1100 people attended his one-man show at the Vancouver Comedy Festival in 2010. After completing formal training at the Upright Citizens Brigade Theatre and The Groundlings, Kirby entered CBS's Diversity Showcase in 2015 and then signed with The Gersh Agency.

== Career ==
Kirby had a minor speaking role in the 2006 comedy film She's the Man, and voiced Kenji in the video game Need for Speed: Carbon the same year.

In 2016, Kirby played Lenjamin McButtons in the LGBTQ web series The Gay and Wondrous Life of Caleb Gallo, and portrayed Bryan in Freeform's Famous in Love in 2018.

In 2019, Kirby appeared as Byron in Grand Hotel, began playing Ben in Freeform's Good Trouble, and Evan Tate in season three and season four of The CW series Dynasty.

Kirby has also appeared as Craig in the independent film Straight Up (2019), and as Noah in Fox's The Gifted (2018).

== Personal life ==
Kirby resides in Los Angeles. He hopes to utilize comedy as a way to bring Asian American stories "to the forefront in both TV and film." In April 2026, he became engaged to professional golfer Gabriella Then.

== Filmography ==
=== Film ===
Year	Title	Role	Notes
2006	She's the Man	Announcer	
2019	Straight Up	Craig	
2022	They Live in the Grey	Peter Yang	
2023	This Time	Colin Lang	

=== Television ===
Year	Title	Role	Notes
2012	Supernatural	Evan	Episode: "Bitten"
2015	Chasing Life	Brian	Episode: "As Long as We Both Shall Live"
2016	The Gay and Wondrous Life of Caleb Gallo	Lenjamin	Web series; main role
2018	Famous in Love	Bryan	3 episodes
2018	Drunk History		Episode: "The Middle Ages"
2018	The Gifted	Noah	2 episodes
2019–2020	Good Trouble	Ben	15 episodes
2019	Grand Hotel	Byron	3 episodes
2019	Liza on Demand	Hendricks	Episode: "The Art of Settling"
2019–2021	Dynasty	Evan Tate	6 episodes
2020	Magnum P.I.	Eli Sung	Episode: "Desperate Measures"
2020	9-1-1: Lone Star	JT	Episode: "Yee-Haw"
2022	Home Economics	Poker buddy	Episode: "Poker Game, $800 Buy-In"
2022	The Conners	Steve	Episode: "Driving, Dating and Deceit"
2023	Minx	Kevin	Episode: "I thought the bed was gonna fly"
2024	English Teacher	Pasha	Episode: "Convention"
2025–present	The Pitt	Dr. John Shen	9 episodes
2025	Ballard	Joey Lucas	Episode: "BYOB"
2026	Eternally Yours	Eric	

=== Video games ===
Year	Title	Role	Notes
2006	Need for Speed: Carbon	Kenji	
