= Audrey Moore (actress) =

American actress

- Born: Albuquerque, New Mexico
- Occupation: Actress
- Years active: 2007–present

Audrey Moore is an American actress. She is best known for her role in the Netflix series Godless. She is also known for her roles in Better Call Saul and Manhattan.

== Filmography ==
=== Film ===
Year	Title	Role	Notes
2009	The Inner Circle	Patty Brown	
2010	Method Acting	Camille Patterson	
2022	They Live in the Grey	Jane	

=== Television ===
Year	Title	Role	Notes
2007	Damages	Waitress	Episode: "Get Me a Lawyer"
2008	The Riches	Margarette	1 episode
2012	CSI: Miami	Carol Church	1 episode
2012	The Middle	OTI Lady	1 episode
2014-2015	Manhattan	Francine	7 episodes
2015	Silicon Valley	Makeup Artist	1 episode
2015	The Night Shift	Reporter	1 episode
2015	Code Black	Ms. Fitz	3 episodes
2015	Bella and the Bulldogs	Reporter	1 episode
2017	Feud	Reporter	1 episode
2017	Better Call Saul	Julie	4 episodes
2017	Godless	Sarah Doyle	7 episodes
2018	Lucifer	Anya	1 episode
2018	Stuck in the Middle	Coach Heller	1 episode
2018	Castle Rock	Mrs. Strand	1 episode
