= 8:00 A.M. (The Pitt season 2) =

- The Pitt episode
- Episode no.: Season 2 Episode 2
- Directed by: Damian Marcano
- Written by: Joe Sachs; R. Scott Gemmill
- Cinematography by: Johanna Coelho
- Editing by: Joey Reinsich
- Production code: T76.10202
- Original air date: January 15, 2026
- Running time: 46 minutes

Guest appearances
- Amielynn Abellera as Perlah; Brandon Mendez Homer as Donnie; Kristin Villanueva as Princess; Charles Baker as Troy; Becca Blackwell as Dylan Easton; Derek Cecil as Michael Williams; Irene Choi as Dr. Joy Kwon; Meta Golding as Noelle Hastings; Ernest Harden Jr. as Louie Cloverfield; Laëtitia Hollard as Emma Nolan; Lucas Iverson as James Ogilvie; Alexandra Metz as Dr. Yolanda Garcia; Zack Morris as Jackson Davis; Jayne Taini as Evelyn Bostick; Christopher Thornton as Dr. Caleb Jefferson; Annabelle Toomey as Kylie Conners; Tracy Vilar as Lupe Perez; Michael Cognata as Allen Billings; Christopher T. Wood as Ian Randall; Heather Wynters as Sister Grace Matthews; Brick Jackson as Barry Mitchell

Episode chronology
← Previous "7:00 A.M."	Next → "9:00 A.M."

"8:00 A.M." is the second episode of the second season of the American medical drama television series The Pitt. It is the seventeenth overall episode of the series and was written by executive producer Joe Sachs and series creator R. Scott Gemmill, and directed by co-executive producer Damian Marcano. It was released on HBO Max on January 15, 2026.

The series is set in Pittsburgh, following the staff of the Pittsburgh Trauma Medical Hospital ER (nicknamed "The Pitt") during a 15-hour emergency department shift. The series mainly follows Dr. Michael "Robby" Robinavitch, a senior attending still reeling from some traumas. In the episode, Robby and Al-Hashimi conduct more tests on the baby, while Whitaker discovers the disadvantages of using AI in their workplace.

The episode received mostly positive reviews from critics, who praised the performances, character development and pacing.

== Plot ==
The baby undergoes more tests to confirm it is healthy, although Al-Hashimi does not disclose why she was left speechless moments earlier. They retrieve some of the baby's urine, while also contacting the police for help.

A man named Allen Billings arrives with a severe injury due to a fall. Robby gets Mel involved in the case, and she helps in getting Allen's exposed bone back in his body. When she tells Robby about her malpractice deposition, he consoles her, explaining that this is normal. She returns to tending a patient, who tries to flirt with her. However, the man escapes upon seeing the police, knocking Mel to the ground. Langdon tends to Mel, and tells her about his drug addiction. While surprised, she states he did not disappoint her. The police fail to catch the man, explaining that he robbed a liquor store the night prior, and want Mel to testify in court if he is caught. Later, Mel, Santos, Al-Hashimi and Emma treat Ian Randall, a man with prolonged erection condition called priapism.

Santos contacts Kylie's father, asking him to come to the hospital. Javadi takes over one of Santos' cases, revolving around a nun named Sister Grace Matthews. Javadi discovers that Grace has Gram-negative bacteria in her system, and offers different treatments. While McKay wants to take more tests for Allen, she is informed by Robby and nurse Noelle Hastings, the hospital's case manager, that Allen lacks the proper insurance and must be moved to another hospital. Barry Mitchell is brought in with sudden onset respiratory distress; the view from laryngoscopy reveals that the man's throat is blocked by a piece of broccoli, which McKay is able to remove.

Whitaker gets Ogilvie and Kwon to take care of Louie after Dana tells him that Bostick's wife Evelyn has arrived, and he must inform her of his death. Whitaker breaks the news, telling Evelyn about Bostick's POLST. When he checks on her later, she has forgotten about the news, so he writes to the hospital that she might need care for Alzheimer's. Al-Hashimi later shows them that a new AI app can help with patients' information, which could help them reduce charting. However, Whitaker notes that the app listed an incorrect medication for the patient.

Outside the hospital, Robby and Al-Hashimi talk about the use of AI in medicine. Al-Hashimi believes it can improve their patient satisfaction scores, but Robby is skeptical. Robby proceeds to take care of a new patient arriving: a college student who has had a psychotic breakdown.

== Production ==
=== Development ===
The episode was written by executive producer Joe Sachs and series creator R. Scott Gemmill, and directed by co-executive producer Damian Marcano. It marked Sachs' fifth writing credit, Gemmill's eighth writing credit, and Marcano's fifth directing credit.

=== Writing ===
R. Scott Gemmill said of Robby's behavior, "So this season, is he really doing the work he needs to do to get better? That's a little bit questionable, which you can tell in the early episodes" of the season. Sepideh Moafi said that this adds to the conflict between Robby and Al-Hashimi, "She prioritizes more of a progressive approach, risk mitigation, burnout prevention, long-term outcomes, and he prioritizes more speed and sort of acknowledges the institutional reality. So it's this tension between the old school versus the future of healthcare, and the evolution of healthcare and the inevitability of technology in healthcare."

Regarding the relationship between Robby and nurse Noelle Hastings, Noah Wyle said, "So, he's been having this lovely experience with someone who works at the hospital, and it's all very grown-up and adult and understood that there's no expectations and lots of freedom. But it's a way of underscoring that the character's having a difficult time attaching." Gemmill added, "The whole show is based upon the professional lives of these physicians and nurses, but they're also human", although executive producer John Wells said, "if you're looking for medical romance, this is not the place that it's likely to be."

Patrick Ball said that Langdon's confession to Mel is done to emphasize his growth as a character, "It's tough to accept other people's belief in you when you don't believe in yourself. I think a lot of the work of people in early recovery is to not become the dark, shitty center of the universe and get preoccupied with your own shame. It's about actually showing up and being present for those around you."

=== Filming ===
For a scene where Troy has its cast opened and reveals maggots living inside it, real maggots were used. Gemmill said that the maggots were not harmed during filming, saying "Some of the things that come through the ER are pretty disturbing, and that's just the least of them. There are some things you can't truly capture without olfactory elements."

== Critical reception ==
"8:00 A.M." received mostly positive reviews from critics. Jesse Schedeen of IGN gave the episode a "great" 8 out of 10 rating and wrote in his verdict, "Even at this early stage, it's clear that The Pitt's second season is a worthy follow-up to the first. The series has shifted in a slightly more humorous direction. And while that approach works on its own merits, it's also painfully obvious that the humor is just buttering up viewers for the inevitable point when the situation in the ER spirals out of control again. I'm both dreading and looking forward to when that time comes."

Caroline Siede of The A.V. Club gave the episode a "B" grade and wrote, "How could a place so eclectic and weird and sometimes flat-out ridiculous ever be codified into an algorithm? Al-Hashimi remains adamant that she can streamline the department with high-tech solutions, but in a high-octane, unpredictable world that might not be so simple."

Maggie Fremont of Vulture gave the episode a 4 star rating out of 5 and wrote, "It's not that Dr. Al has bad intentions or is incompetent, quite the opposite, but when you show up to your first day and tell the person who has been running the show for years that you have 'ideas for improvement,' how do you think he's going to take it? I'm not saying Robby is infallible, but I am saying I am Team Robby no matter what and I would die for this man."

Brady Langmann of Esquire wrote, "The Pitt is what happens when you lump a group of people from a large swath of backgrounds (and generations) and ask them to work together as a single, flawless, utopian unit. As is the case in your cubicle and its surrounding area, I'm sure you run into one teensy problem: Ego. If you need a reminder of what that looks like in practice, I direct you to this week's episode." Alec Bojalad of Den of Geek wrote, "In sickness and in health, reality is always the real star on The Pitt. Sometimes it gives you the most breathtakingly tragic intersection of love, death, and memory you've ever seen. Other times, it gives you a dick joke. It's all in an hour's work, with 13 more to go."

Johnny Loftus of Decider wrote, "Last time we heard about the 'patient passports,' and here ... Al-Hashimi's showing off an app that uses generative AI to reduce time spent on staff charting. OK, cool, that has always been a burden. But then there are creative solves and individual investment, the main drivers of Robby's ethos." Adam Patla of Telltale TV gave the episode a 4 star rating out of 5 and wrote, "Across the board, '8:00 AM' does a wonderful job giving these characters opportunities to show off how they have or haven't developed in ten months' time. There's room for those developments to come forward in natural ways without bludgeoning the audience with flat out exposition. The characters get to breathe and the audience breathes with them."

Sean T. Collins of The New York Times wrote, "Their jargon may sound arcane to the layman. Their cases may be painful or bloody or bizarre to witness. But their hopes, fears and foibles are instantly recognizable. They instill hope that we, too, can achieve our own quiet triumphs." Jasmine Blu of TV Fanatic gave the episode a 4.2 star rating out of 5 and wrote, "So much happens during ['8:00 A.M.'] ... It's just stressful enough to deliver The Pitt's chaotic vibe, yet not nearly enough to match the energy of The Pitt Season 1."

=== Accolades ===
TVLine named Taylor Dearden as the "Performer of the Week" for the week of January 17, 2026, for her performance in the episode. The site wrote, "On paper, there was nothing particularly showy about Dearden's performance this week ... Then again, Dearden has never needed volume to command our attention. As the endearing Dr. Mel King, she has routinely won audiences over with her quiet specificity ... what she managed to communicate this week when Mel was asked a question she's never really had the luxury to consider — who she is when she's not taking care of someone else ... She visibly scrambled for an answer when asked what she likes to do for fun. Every option that came to mind was tethered to her sister, Becca, and Mel's role as her primary caregiver. The realization hit her in real time. Dearden let the shock wash over her, making her recognition palpable. Then came her answer, which was even more revealing. She landed on the Renaissance Fair — a choice that suggests how rare it is for Mel to escape the burden of responsibility."
