= 9:00 A.M. (The Pitt season 2) =

- The Pitt episode
- Episode no.: Season 2 Episode 3
- Directed by: Uta Briesewitz
- Written by: Noah Wyle
- Cinematography by: Johanna Coelho
- Editing by: Mark Strand
- Production code: T76.10203
- Original air date: January 22, 2026
- Running time: 45 minutes

Guest appearances
- Amielynn Abellera as Perlah Alawi; Brandon Mendez Homer as Donnie Donahue; Kristin Villanueva as Princess Dela Cruz; Ino Badanjak as Gina; Charles Baker as Troy; Tony Becker as Sloan Hansen; Becca Blackwell as Dylan Easton; Derek Cecil as Michael Williams; Irene Choi as Dr. Joy Kwon; Irina Dubova as Yana Kovalenko; Jessica "Limer" Flores as Harlow Graham; Ernest Harden Jr. as Louie Cloverfield; Sam Hennings as Harlan Hansen; Laëtitia Hollard as Emma Nolan; Lucas Iverson as James Ogilvie; Angela Lin as Nancy Yee; Alexandra Metz as Dr. Yolanda Garcia; Zack Morris as Jackson Davis; Patrick Mulvey as Benny Connors; Michael Nouri as Nathaniel Montrose; Amanda Schull as Gretchen Lambdin; Eugene Shaw as Mark Yee; Annabelle Toomey as Kylie Connors; Tracy Vilar as Lupe Perez; Kurtis Bedford as Tony Chinchiolo; Ned Brower as Nurse Jesse Van Horn; Johnath Davis as Ahmad; Lawrence Robinson as Brian Hancock; Christopher T. Wood as Ian Randall

Episode chronology
| ← Previous "8:00 A.M." | Next → "10:00 A.M." |

"9:00 A.M." is the third episode of the second season of the American medical drama television series The Pitt. It is the eighteenth overall episode of the series and was written by main cast member Noah Wyle and directed by co-executive producer Uta Briesewitz. It was released on HBO Max on January 22, 2026.

The series is set in Pittsburgh, following the staff of the Pittsburgh Trauma Medical Hospital ER (nicknamed "The Pitt") during a 15-hour emergency department shift. The series mainly follows Dr. Michael "Robby" Robinavitch, a senior attending still reeling from some traumas. In the episode, Robby and the staff try to save a man involved in a motorcycle accident, while Santos confronts Kylie's father over her bruises.

The episode received mostly positive reviews from critics, who praised the performances, tone, writing, and cliffhanger.

== Plot ==
College student Jackson Davis is brought into the Pitt while suffering a psychotic breakdown. Campus security guard Tony Chinchiolo also arrives at the hospital with a head injury, explaining that Jackson threw a chair at him. He plans to stay despite Dana's instructions, as he wants to testify with the police.

Robby, Al-Hashimi and the staff treat Mark Yee, a man who got involved in a severe motorcycle accident. His wife, Nancy, is agitated by the accident, as she had a fight with him before the accident. Results indicate a possible hypokalemic periodic paralysis, and during their efforts to save him, Nancy faints, discovering that she has a bruise in her body. She is taken for treatment due to internal bleeding, while Mark regains consciousness.

Kylie's father, Benny, arrives at the hospital, and gets into a heated argument with his girlfriend for indirectly causing Kylie to fall off the stairs. Dylan Easton, the hospital's Social Services representative, questions Benny over Kylie's bruises, which he claims are due to soccer. Realizing they think he is abusing her, Benny gets into an argument with the staff, before Dana brings up Kylie's urine test: the bruises are actually due to immune thrombocytopenic purpura (ITP). After consulting with Benny and his ex-wife, Santos agrees to give her a dose of steroids, but informs them that Kylie will have to stay in the hospital for three days. Benny and his girlfriend get into another argument, culminating in their breakup.

Robby tends to Yana Kovalenko, a Jewish woman with severe burns on her thigh. She reveals she survived the Pittsburgh synagogue shooting, but is still struggling with PTSD as the Fourth of July fireworks remind her of the tragedy. She bonds with Robby and with nurse Perlah, thanking the Pittsburgh Muslim community for helping victims with their funds. McKay gets Michael Williams' CT results, revealing that he has a mass in the frontal lobe, which could indicate a brain tumor. She contacts Michael's ex-wife, Gretchen Lambdin, and has them discuss options for possible recovery. Gretchen becomes emotional at the possibility that Michael's tumor could have contributed to the mood swings that contributed to the breakdown of their marriage.

Al-Hashimi informs the police that Jackson shows no sign of drug use, making the police realize that Tony used his taser on Jackson prematurely. As the hospital finally sees some clear space, Dana receives a call; nearby hospital Westbridge has issued a code black due to an internal disaster and will close temporarily. As such, ambulance traffic will be diverted to the Pitt.

== Production ==
=== Development ===
The episode was written by main cast member Noah Wyle and directed by co-executive producer Uta Briesewitz. It marked Wyle's third writing credit, and Briesewitz's first directing credit.

=== Writing ===
Noah Wyle said that including the Pittsburgh synagogue shooting as a point of reference in the series was a "wonderful opportunity". He said, "When I started researching it, the aspects of it that moved me the most were the community outcry afterward from the Muslim community and the solidarity with the Jewish community of Pittsburgh working together to grieve and mourn the loss. It was the most underreported aspect of the story, and perhaps the most hopeful moving forward." He also explained that this allowed the series to explore Robby's relationship with his Jewish faith, "Well, Robby's faith, or lack thereof, or grappling with his faith last season and including him and his lowest moment reciting the Shema — almost like this childlike prayer, this sort of very primal plea for help — was a really important part of the character's evolution."

Regarding her reaction to Kylie's injuries, Isa Briones explained, "As a doctor who is caring for this child, you have to rule out the worst possible things. For her, it was trying to be a good doctor, trying to make sure that this wasn't happening, and really addressing that first." She further added, "Everyone comes from different walks of life and brings that to work, for better or worse. There are always pros and cons. But it makes sense that she would immediately think of that — because she's seen some of the worst of humanity. That conclusion comes from experience."

In the episode, Langdon recites poetry by John O'Donohue while tending to a child patient. Wyle said that this came from a conversation with his close friend David Crosby's widow Jen, who introduced him to his works. He added, "When it came time to writing this scene, it's three fathers in a room with a kid that won't sit still — and that's a rare thing to get. Donahue is a new father; he's got a baby at home. Langdon's got [slightly] older kids. And fatherhood doesn't come with a manual. So you've got three guys in there talking about their experiences of being fathers."

== Critical reception ==
"9:00 A.M." received mostly positive reviews from critics. Jesse Schedeen of IGN gave the episode a "good" 7 out of 10 rating and wrote in his verdict, "The Pitt gives us what appears to be the last relatively quiet installment of Season 2 in Episode 3. And while the lack of focus on some of the major doctors like Langdon and Mel proves a bit frustrating, on the whole that more subdued approach is still working well. This episode continues the heavier dose of humor, but it also focuses a lot on moments of compassion and the bonds that can form between doctors and patients. It feels like a brief reprieve before things start to really spiral out of control in Episode 4."

Caroline Siede of The A.V. Club gave the episode a "B+" grade and wrote, "As someone who doesn't usually start my work day until 10:00 or 11:00 a.m., I'd forgotten just how early the ER staff clock in each morning. So it makes sense that after two slightly slower re-introductory episodes, “the day is starting to heat up” here at 9:00 a.m."

Maggie Fremont of Vulture gave the episode a 4 star rating out of 5 and wrote, "In his first writing credit of the new season, Wyle also manages to work in a small but moving storyline to honor the people of Pittsburgh."

Brady Langmann of Esquire wrote, "The Pitt's tribute to the Tree of Life victims isn't just a reminder why The Pitt is the most essential show on TV right now — it's another example of why Wyle and company simply understand the city at the heart of their show." Alec Bojalad of Den of Geek wrote, "Yana's conversations with Robby and nurse Perlah Alawi are simple but affecting. They represent the show finding novel and unobtrusive ways to conjure up quick pathos. The scenes also serve as a reminder that not every American medical drama need be set in New York, Chicago, or Los Angeles. Human tragedy isn't confined to the coasts. The Pitt has plenty of it to go around. No wonder its doctors need a release."

Johnny Loftus of Decider wrote, "A developing situation at another area hospital has diverted all ambulance traffic to PTMC. “Is this a joke? A drill? It's the 4th of fucking July.” But it's no joke: the Pitt is about to get slammed." Adam Patla of Telltale TV gave the episode a 4 star rating out of 5 and wrote, "Between Robby's impending sabbatical, the Pitt itself struggling systemically, and the busy holiday, a much larger struggle looms over the horizon that will surely test our characters. What that larger test is remains to be seen given that the cause of the redirect is still a mystery."

Sean T. Collins of The New York Times wrote, "As that scene makes clear, The Pitt is not a show for the cynical. The show is full to bursting with heartfelt declarations of devotion, moving rapprochements between estranged loved ones, copious tears of both sadness and joy, and celebrations of cooperation and community. This sweet stuff can be hard to swallow when you've been weaned on a bitter diet of prestige antihero dramas like The Sopranos." Jasmine Blu of TV Fanatic gave the episode a 4.1 star rating out of 5 and wrote, "So, The Pitt Season 2 Episode 3 gave us some fun and some flirting, the type that has me side-eyeing, raising brows, and, okay, maybe even becoming a hopeless romantic."
