= 9:00 P.M. (The Pitt season 2) =

- The Pitt episode
- Episode no.: Season 2 Episode 15
- Directed by: John Wells
- Written by: R. Scott Gemmill
- Cinematography by: Johanna Coelho
- Editing by: Mark Strand
- Production code: T76.10215
- Original air date: April 16, 2026
- Running time: 50 minutes

Guest appearances
- Shawn Hatosy as Dr. Jack Abbot (special guest star); Amielynn Abellera as Perlah Alawi; Jalen Thomas Brooks as Mateo Diaz; Tal Anderson as Becca King; Charles Baker as Troy Digby; Bailey Gavulic as Amy Miller; Ayesha Harris as Dr. Parker Ellis; Sofia Hasmik as Dr. Nazely Toomarian; Ken Kirby as Dr. John Shen; Jeff Kober as Duke Ekins; Luke Tennie as Dr. Crus Henderson; Nicole Wolf as Judith Lastrade; Jona Xiao as Sam Garvin; Luca Pinder and Luna Pinder as Baby Jane Doe (infant twins; Luca appears in the finale's concluding scene with Noah Wyle)

Episode chronology
← Previous "8:00 P.M."	Next → —

"9:00 P.M." is the fifteenth episode and season finale of the second season of the American medical drama television series The Pitt. It is the 30th overall episode of the series and was written by series creator R. Scott Gemmill, and directed by executive producer John Wells. It was released on HBO Max on April 16, 2026.

The series is set in Pittsburgh, following the staff of the Pittsburgh Trauma Medical Hospital ER (nicknamed "The Pitt") during a 15-hour emergency department shift. The series mainly follows Dr. Michael "Robby" Robinavitch, a senior attending still reeling from some traumas. In the episode, Robby and the staff prepare to finish their shift, but Robby is still confronted by problems in his life.

The episode received critical acclaim, with critics praising the performances, writing, closure to the storylines, emotional tone, and directing. Noah Wyle, Sepideh Moafi and Shawn Hatosy submitted the episode to support their Emmy nominations for Outstanding Lead Actor in a Drama Series, Outstanding Supporting Actress in a Drama Series and Outstanding Supporting Actor in a Drama Series, respectively.

== Plot ==
Al-Hashimi explains to Robby her life with her condition, noting that the day marked the first time in a year she had a seizure. Robby is called to meet with Duke, who fixed his motorcycle. Robby and Abbot later argue over Robby's road trip, but are interrupted by the arrival of Judith Lastrade, a pregnant woman diagnosed with severe pre-eclampsia and HELLP syndrome. Abbot takes the case, while Robby and Duke part ways, with Duke making Robby promise to return from his trip.

After taking his drug test, Langdon finds Mel outside, disappointed that Becca chose to be with her boyfriend instead of meeting her for the fireworks. Learning she must attend another deposition, a stressed Mel accepts Santos' invitation for drinks. Javadi confides in Whitaker that she is still struggling over her career, questioning her future at the hospital and whether ER work is viable amid the staff's many traumas. Whitaker suggests her passion is mental health, prompting her to have an epiphany. When Robby praises Javadi's social media posts, she tells him she is considering emergency psychiatry, which he supports. Dana notices police officers leaving and forces them to take the rape kits stored in the ER, scolding them for failing to collect an earlier kit for over two weeks.

When Judith suffers a seizure, the night staff must deliver her baby a few weeks early by emergency C-section despite her wish for a freebirth. With help from Robby and McKay, they save both Judith and her baby. With his shift over, Robby prepares to leave, giving Whitaker instructions for his apartment and handing him the keys. Whitaker leaves with Amy, still missing his ID badge, unaware Digby took it along with a training dummy. Robby then speaks with Mohan, who admits she has neither spoken with her mother nor chosen an elective. Robby confides that he once wanted a family and children, but instead finds himself alone while still working in the ER. Mohan tells him he is needed at the Pitt despite the difficulty of working with him.

Robby finds Al-Hashimi, who says her neurologist cleared her to work as a senior attending. Robby refuses until her seizures are verifiably under control, citing the danger of handling critical cases while impaired and even of driving. They have a heated argument, and Robby warns he will report her condition to the administration if she does not.

Abbot takes Robby aside to discuss his sabbatical and mental health; he tells Robby he never committed suicide after losing his leg and wife because he still finds life worth living despite tragedy. He cites Judith's case, noting that Robby's actions saved both her and her child. A tearful Robby says the amount of death he has witnessed on the job has deeply damaged his psyche, and admits he is tired of being a role model while suffering internally. Abbot urges him to seek help, saying therapy helped him cope with their work's trauma. Meanwhile, Al-Hashimi leaves the hospital in her car, but stops in the parking lot and breaks down crying. Many staff members gather on the rooftop to watch the Fourth of July fireworks over downtown Pittsburgh.

Langdon visits the Surgical Care Unit to check on Debbie Cohen. (Note: Debbie's case was covered in "10:00 A.M." and "11:00 A.M.", revealing her to have necrotizing fasciitis.) He learns that although she survived surgery, her leg was amputated above the knee. On his way out, he meets Robby, who apologizes for delaying their conversation all day. Langdon says he is doing everything possible to maintain sobriety and suggests Robby is afraid to ask for help, adding that the impossible standards Robby sets for himself prevent his students from fully learning from him. Before leaving, Langdon tells Robby to be honest with himself and urges him to seek help. Robby then checks on the abandoned baby, whom Dana has been trying to place in foster care, and comforts her while reflecting on his own abandonment by his mother at age eight. He assures the baby, and himself, that life still has much to offer.

In a mid-credits scene, Santos and Mel sing Alanis Morissette's "You Oughta Know" at a karaoke bar.

== Production ==
=== Development ===
The episode was written by series creator R. Scott Gemmill, and directed by executive producer John Wells. This marked Gemmill's 11th writing credit, and Wells' fourth directing credit.

=== Writing ===
Regarding Al-Hashimi's condition, Gemmill commented, "In this scenario, it's what happens when you're faced with an affliction that may cause you to lose the one thing and prevent you from doing the one thing that you really have spent your whole life working towards, and what does that mean and how does that affect your identity?" Sepideh Moafi explained Al-Hashimi's confrontation with Robby, saying: "[Al-Hashimi] spent her life thinking that if I reveal myself, to put it simply I won't be accepted, and I won't be lovable, and I'll lose everything I've worked so hard for. And he is proving her right."

On Robby's status at the end of the episode, Gemmill said, "I don't think he's hit rock bottom yet. He certainly had some stumbles. Robby has a long way to go to heal himself, and he hasn't really even started the sabbatical, which is a double-edged sword. It could be very good for him to go away, but I think he is a little suicidal, and that's got a lot of people concerned. But he's also a grown man, and there's only so much we can do. So, the big question at the end is: is he going to go, and if he does, is he going to come back?" With the final scene, he said, "the baby is, in some ways, the one person he can talk to, where he feels comfortable, because he knows whatever he says is never going to go anywhere else. He's not the greatest at sharing his emotions when they're really personal. He's very good at helping patients, but he's probably the worst patient himself."

Gemmill explained that he knew the season would end with Robby embracing the baby, but he felt he "wanted something – I thought it'd be fun to have an Easter egg." He came up with the idea of including a karaoke scene, and decided that Mel and Santos had to be involved as they "had a really rough day." He let Taylor Dearden and Isa Briones choose the song, and they picked "You Oughta Know". He considered the scene "a nice sigh of relief after a heavy episode."

=== Casting ===
On April 2, 2026, it was reported that Supriya Ganesh would exit the series on the second season finale. Her exit was described as a "story-driven decision". Wyle said that this is "an inevitability that's going to happen every season with this show." Gemmill further added, "Due to the nature of a teaching hospital, a lot of people move on. That's part of the fabric of the show." Ganesh expressed her thoughts on where Ganesh's character Mohan would be, "I hope she goes somewhere where she has an attending that thinks she's fit to be in the ER, maybe if Dr. Al-Hashimi takes over. It's been really interesting thinking about how different her experience of the ER might have been if she had a different attending."

== Critical reception ==
"9:00 P.M." received critical acclaim. Jesse Schedeen of IGN gave the episode an "amazing" 9 out of 10 rating and writing in his verdict, "Despite losing a bit of momentum in the home stretch, The Pitt Season 2 still manages to end on a strong note in “9:00 PM."... The finale is dramatic and ominous when it needs to be, but it also manages to frequently be heartfelt and humorous. It's a well-rounded endcap to a largely successful season of television."

Caroline Siede of The A.V. Club gave the episode an "A–" grade and wrote, "There's only so much anyone can change over the course of just one day. Looking back, this season has been about basically everyone in the ER trying to persuade Robby to get some help. Maybe it's the cumulative weight of all of their words ... that will finally inspire him to actually seek it out."

Maggie Fremont of Vulture gave the episode a perfect 5 star rating out of 5 and wrote, "It is a poignantly untidy ending — which is exactly what this season calls for. Robby's mental-health issues are messy and complicated and certainly cannot be solved in one 15-hour day at work ... The ED is very much a place of life and death, and The Pitt reminds us that this applies to the people who work there, too."

Judy Berman of TIME wrote, "By blowing off steam together, Mel is forming an independent identity and Santos is finding a healthy outlet for her anger. This could be the first step, for both of them, towards escaping a life circumscribed by work. For The Pitt, it could be the first step in imagining a world that doesn't always revolve around Robby. We don't really need to know, before Season 3, whether that means it's too late to save him." Sean Morrison of Screen Rant wrote, "All of these problems, from Robby's depression to Santos' feelings of isolation, melted away the second they started reaching out to their friends and colleagues. They're not solved, that's not how mental illness works, but the worst of the symptoms are most effectively treated by having a strong support system and not being afraid to use it. That's the greatest lesson The Pitt season 2 imparted: ask for help when you need it."

Ben Travers of IndieWire gave the episode a "B+" grade and wrote, "See the ending however you like. In the end, The Pitt brings people together when it counts, be it in the emergency center to save a life or at karaoke to live them." Brady Langmann of Esquire wrote, "Robby isn't just talking to the baby, who herself is about to begin anew. He's talking to himself. Robby will be okay."

Johnny Loftus of Decider wrote, "He assures this unknown baby girl that life, in all its messiness and joy, will be waiting for her. We'll be waiting for Robby and The Pitt to be back, too. It's gonna be OK." Adam Patla of Telltale TV gave the episode a 4 star rating out of 5 and wrote, "The question remains: Where does Robby go from here? Noah Wyle leaves us with just one final tremendous bit of acting before we fade to black. His eyes flicker with debate, and, although we don't know what he'll do on this sabbatical, maybe, just maybe, he's convinced himself he can stay."

Sean T. Collins of The New York Times wrote, "You want fireworks? You've got them. The 15th and final chapter of The Pitt Season 2 begins at 9 p.m. on the Fourth of July, and explosions in the sky are to be expected. But the episode detonates one emotional payload after another. It's a near-hour of pain and catharsis, one that leaves the viewer feeling the kind of exhilaration and exhaustion that the staffers of the E.R. know so well." Jasmine Blu of TV Fanatic gave the episode a 4.3 star rating out of 5 and wrote, "The season finale came through with some powerful moments and some reality checks for Robby and Al-Hashimi, too. There's a certain beauty in the breakthrough, and that's where things land: it's tentative, quieter for now; we're left to sit with the fact that they made it through another day."

=== Accolades ===
TVLine named Noah Wyle the "Performer of the Week" for the week of April 18, 2026, for his performance in the episode. The site wrote: "It's the kind of performance that doesn't just land in the moment. It re-contextualizes everything that came before it and makes you wonder what, if anything, is left of Robby on the other side."

Award	Category	Nominee(s)	Result	Ref.
Primetime Creative Arts Emmy Awards	Outstanding Picture Editing for a Drama Series	Mark Strand	Nominated	
Primetime Creative Arts Emmy Awards	Outstanding Production Design for a Narrative Contemporary Program (One Hour or More)	Nina Ruscio, Josh Lusby, and Matt Callahan	Nominated	
Primetime Creative Arts Emmy Awards	Outstanding Prosthetic Makeup	Myriam Arougheti, Arjen Tuiten, Thom Floutz, Chris Burgoyne, Martina Sykes, and Hanny Tjan	Won	
Primetime Emmy Awards	Outstanding Lead Actor in a Drama Series	Noah Wyle	Won	
Primetime Emmy Awards	Outstanding Supporting Actor in a Drama Series	Shawn Hatosy	Nominated	
Primetime Emmy Awards	Outstanding Supporting Actress in a Drama Series	Sepideh Moafi	Nominated	
