= 2:00 P.M. (The Pitt season 2) =

- The Pitt episode
- Episode no.: Season 2 Episode 8
- Directed by: John Cameron
- Written by: Joe Sachs
- Cinematography by: Johanna Coelho
- Editing by: Joey Reinisch
- Production code: T76.10208
- Original air date: February 26, 2026
- Running time: 45 minutes

Guest appearances
- Shawn Hatosy as Dr. Jack Abbot (special guest star); Amielynn Abellera as Perlah Alawi; Brandon Mendez Homer as Donnie Donahue; Kristin Villanueva as Princess; Brittany Allen as Roxie Hamler; Charles Baker as Troy Digby; Irene Choi as Dr. Joy Kwon; Jessica "Limer" Flores as Harlow Graham; Bonita Friedericy as Cora Wilkins; John Getz as Lloyd Wilkins; Taylor Handley as Paul Hamler; Ayesha Harris as Dr. Parker Ellis; Laëtitia Hollard as Emma Nolan; Lucas Iverson as James Ogilvie; Tina Ivlev as Ilana Miller; Alexandra Metz as Dr. Yolanda Garcia; Victor Rivas Rivers as Trent Norris; Craig Ricci Shaynak as Howard Knox; Christopher Thornton as Dr. Caleb Jefferson; Tracy Vilar as Lupe Perez; Ned Brower as Jesse Van Horn; Johnath Davis as Ahmad; Moshe Kasher as Jacob Samuel; Briana Burnside as Jackie Liddell; Adargiza De Los Santos as Nicole Steadman; Staci Lynn Fletcher as Brook Maccord; Victoria Mack as Wendy Maccord; Ryan Brophy as Toby Sullivan

Episode chronology
← Previous "1:00 P.M."	Next → "3:00 P.M."

"2:00 P.M." is the eighth episode of the second season of the American medical drama television series The Pitt. It is the 23rd overall episode of the series and was written by executive producer Joe Sachs, and directed by John Cameron. It was released on HBO Max on February 26, 2026.

The series is set in Pittsburgh, following the staff of the Pittsburgh Trauma Medical Hospital ER (nicknamed "The Pitt") during a 15-hour emergency department shift. The series mainly follows Dr. Michael "Robby" Robinavitch, a senior attending still reeling from some traumas. In the episode, the hospital tries to accommodate to its analog status, but the staff faces many problems without the access to the computer system.

The episode received positive reviews from critics, who praised the writing, performances, and prosthetics in the episode.

== Plot ==
With the computer systems shut down, Robby tells the staff that they need to go analog. Whitaker's photo of the patient board is too blurry to read, but Joy helps recreate it using her photographic memory, while Abbot stays to assist. As Dana is still busy working with Ilana, the sexual assault case, Perlah suggests that a reluctant Princess continue as acting charge nurse. The younger doctors are slow to adapt to the lack of technology, in particular Javadi, while Robby is frustrated that Al-Hashimi was consulted about the shutdown before him.

While treating Howard Knox, an obese man with abdominal pain and fever, Ogilvie makes insensitive remarks about his weight, for which he is chided by McKay and Whitaker. After Robby successfully places an awake naso-tracheal tube, the team weighs Howard and learn he is too heavy for the hospital's CT scanner, forcing them to relocate him to UPMC Presbyterian; Abbot offers to accompany him.

Al-Hashimi gives informed consent choice of thrombolysis medication to Brook Maccord, a patient with central retinal artery occlusion, before assigning a distracted Mel to observe. She also encourages Mohan to take fellowship in geriatrics after seeing her skill in treating the elderly. They decide to accept the suggestion for the abandoned baby to be placed into emergency foster care.

Santos is praised by Al-Hashimi and Langdon, the latter of whom she ignores, for her diagnosis and treatment of Harlow's trigger point. Santos and Langdon then cooperate awkwardly to treat Jackie Lidell, a woman who bit her own tongue after binge drinking, causing a deep laceration. Joy notices Santos's passive-aggressive attitude toward Langdon's attempts at supervising, while Jackie is so drunk she soon forgets why she is in the ED.

Javadi introduces Jackson's parents to Nicole Steadman, who leads a parents support group for the psychiatric service. Due to the confusion in charting, Javadi and Ogilvie examine the same patient, a man with severe rashes. They almost misdiagnose it before Joy correctly identifies it as phytophotodermatitis, learning the patient was making margaritas under direct sunlight.

Dana takes Ilana's rape kit to lock it inside the special fridge where it will be collected within 72 hours. However, she is enraged to find another kit from two weeks prior, and angrily calls the police station to pick it up.

Noticing Mel is still nervous over her incoming deposition about the spinal tap on a boy with measles, (Note: As seen in the first season's "8:00 P.M." and "9:00 P.M.") Dr. Ellis (who was herself deposed) tells her the procedure went exactly as planned and that the parents' lawsuit is frivolous. McKay states that Roxie still suffers terrible pain, so Robby tells her to increase the morphine up to 12 milligrams (0.19 gr) an hour, a very high dose. McKay is worried, but Robby likens it to the principle of double effect. Robby observes the chaos in the hospital amidst the system shutdown and asks Dana how they "plan to get through this mess."

== Production ==
=== Development ===
The episode was written by executive producer Joe Sachs, and directed by John Cameron. It marked Sachs' sixth writing credit, and Cameron's fourth directing credit.

=== Writing ===
Showrunner R. Scott Gemmill said that the writers had the idea of "going analog" in the hospital, as he and other writers like Joe Sachs wrote for ER, explaining "We just went with the clear boards so we could see through it and give us more shooting opportunities. It was visually interesting. Cell phones weren't really a thing. There weren't digital charts. Half the stuff that's there now wasn't even available to us."

== Critical reception ==
"2:00 P.M." received positive reviews from critics. Jesse Schedeen of IGN gave the episode a "great" 8 out of 10 rating and wrote in his verdict, "If not the strongest episode of Season 2 to date, '2:00 PM' is nonetheless a very solid addition to the mix that manages to amp up the tension in the E.R. considerably. The desperate shift to analog medicine results in plenty of new drama and chaos. The series also continues to benefit mightily from strong performances from the likes of Katherine LaNasa and Patrick Ball. Most of the main characters are in a good place right now, dramatically, but the series definitely needs to sort itself out where Lucas Iverson's Ogilvie is concerned. A character this two-dimensionally repulsive has no place in The Pitt."

Caroline Siede of The A.V. Club gave the episode a "B+" grade and wrote, "In some ways, the tech crisis upends the PTMC emergency room as we know it. There is no shortage of missteps and confusion to send the ER into semi-comedic chaos. But, for the most part, our doctors and nurses actually do an admirable job of keeping up business as usual too. Once the younger folks get a basic handle on the paperwork flow and the importance of ballpoint pens, the patients keep rolling in, the diagnoses keep coming, and everyone just about manages to keep themselves above water. I was expecting a full-on crisis this hour, but '2:00 P.M.' mostly continues the sense of semi-normalcy that has characterized this season."

Maggie Fremont of Vulture gave the episode a 3 star rating out of 5 and wrote, "The Pitt is stressful right now. It's not that there is a particularly life-threatening, emergent patient rolling in — although that 'margarita burn' case does look painful as hell, both physically and emotionally, because I would be bummed if I could never make margaritas in the sun again. The stress, this time around, comes from the level of disorganization currently plaguing the ER. That's what happens when you need to shut down all of your computer systems in order to prevent a cyberattack, I guess. It's not that our crew can't handle it, but what a monumental task to ask all of these people to transition to a completely new system of protocols while still treating an ever-growing number of patients."

Johnny Loftus of Decider wrote, "We can think of a few people in positions of power who'd deserve a shove back into line by someone like Dana. Emma's eyes go wide as the all-powerful charge nurse calls Pittsburgh PD to light a fire under their asses. They expect instant treatment for their cops? Well get over here and pick up these crucial chain of evidence rape kits." Adam Patla of Telltale TV gave the episode a 4.1 star rating out of 5 and wrote, "The Pitt envelopes its audience in the chaos without completely alienating them. This shared headspace that effectively ramps up the tension for the rest of the episode with audiences in a heightened, yet frazzled state."

Sean T. Collins of The New York Times wrote, "It is notable how Ogilvie's callousness makes him seem like a man apart from the other characters we've come to know and love in this show. There is a lesson to be learned there: For better or worse, we're all in this together." Jasmine Blu of TV Fanatic gave the episode a 4.4 star rating out of 5 and wrote, "We get our first glimpse of what going analog means on The Pitt Season 2 Episode 7, and it's a jolly good time. Also, Joy emerges as the best addition of the season, Howard is inarguably the sweetest patient they have yet, and there's so much delicious tension."
