= 10:00 A.M. (The Pitt season 2) =

- The Pitt episode
- Episode no.: Season 2 Episode 4
- Directed by: John Cameron
- Written by: Cynthia Adarkwa
- Cinematography by: Johanna Coelho
- Editing by: Tamara Luciano
- Production code: T76.10204
- Original air date: January 29, 2026
- Running time: 49 minutes

Guest appearances
- Amielynn Abellera as Perlah Alawi; Brandon Mendez Homer as Donnie Donahue; Kristin Villanueva as Princess; Irene Choi as Dr. Joy Kwon; Erin Croom as Jada Davis; Meta Golding as Noelle Hastings; Ernest Harden Jr. as Louie Cloverfield; Laëtitia Hollard as Emma Nolan; Lucas Iverson as James Ogilvie; Jessica "Limer" Flores as Harlow Graham; Nyaling Marenah as Phylicia Ronson; Alexandra Metz as Dr. Yolanda Garcia; Zack Morris as Jackson Davis; Michael Nouri as Nathaniel Montrose; Eugene Shaw as Mark Yee; Christopher Thornton as Dr. Caleb Jefferson; Tracy Vilar as Lupe Perez; Charles Baker as Troy Digby; Elysia Roorbach as Willow Baptiste; Lawrence Robinson as Brian Hancock; William Guirola as Orlando Diaz; Loren Escandon as Lorrie Diaz; Derek Anthony as Jean Samba; Kevin Morgan as Vince Cole; Johnath Davis as Ahmad; Ned Brower as Nurse Jesse Van Horn

Episode chronology
← Previous "9:00 A.M."	Next → "11:00 A.M."

"10:00 A.M." is the fourth episode of the second season of the American medical drama television series The Pitt. It is the nineteenth overall episode of the series and was written by supervising producer Cynthia Adarkwa and directed by John Cameron. It was released on HBO Max on January 29, 2026.

The series is set in Pittsburgh, following the staff of the Pittsburgh Trauma Medical Hospital ER (nicknamed "The Pitt") during a 15-hour emergency department shift. The series mainly follows Dr. Michael "Robby" Robinavitch, a senior attending still reeling from some traumas. In the episode, the Pitt starts receiving patients from Westbridge, with each doctor facing different challenges.

The episode received mostly positive reviews from critics, who praised the writing, performances, character development and themes.

== Plot ==
The staff prepares for the new diverted cases from Westbridge, but Robby continues to keep Langdon in triage. He instead gets Whitaker, Santos and Javadi to attend the first arrivals, while he tends to Vince Cole, a young man who fell through a skylight while attempting parkour. While treating Vince, Joy cuts her finger on a piece of glass in his body, requiring HIV and hepatitis testing. Emma collects a blood sample from Joy's finger, but accidentally drops and destroys the vial. Ogilvie pulls out a large shard of glass from Vince's back, causing significant bleeding that Robby, McKay and Garcia manage to mitigate, ultimately saving Vince's life. Robby tells Ogilvie to leave deeply embedded objects to surgeons.

Jackson's sister, Jada, arrives to check on her brother, and is confused when the staff tells her that he might have mental health problems. While tending his patient, Jean Samba, Whitaker manages to detect a posterior STEMI in time. With Robby's help, he manages to save Samba from a fatal heart attack. He later tends to Louie's toothache, with Ogilvie's help. Langdon tries to help Willow Baptiste, a woman who accidentally used superglue in one of her eyes. Willow asks "Dr. J" to help her, revealed to be Javadi. She cuts Willow's eyelashes, with Langdon surprised that she attained an audience through TikTok. McKay manually resets an elderly man Nathaniel Montrose's fractured tailbone. Afterwards, Brian Hancock, a patient with a soccer injury, asks McKay out on a date, and she accepts.

Mohan treats patient Orlando Diaz, whose wife tells her the family is uninsured and cannot afford proper treatment. Mohan consults with Noelle Hastings, who confirms that the Diaz family's annual income is over the Medicaid threshold, preventing them from getting the insurance. She instead suggests obtaining private insurance through the Affordable Care Act; while the daughter, Ana, is worried over the expenses, Mohan consoles her. Ana starts a GoFundMe to cover it, but Orlando forces her to shut it down.

Santos and Mel treat a woman, Phylicia Ronson, who Mel deduces has bulimia; they place her in an eating-disorder therapy program. Al-Hashimi pressures Santos to complete her charting in time, threatening to make her repeat her second year of residency otherwise. Psychiatrist Caleb Jefferson encourages Robby to give therapy another chance, but Robby insists on his sabbatical. Al-Hashimi takes Langdon off triage. Langdon is informed that Debbie Cohen, a patient with cellulitis that he treated earlier in the day, has returned after her infection has worsened. While he tells Debbie that they can treat her, he confides in Donnie that she has a MRSA infection or worse.

== Production ==
=== Development ===
The episode was written by supervising producer Cynthia Adarkwa and directed by John Cameron. It marked Adarkwa's second writing credit, and Cameron's third directing credit.

=== Writing ===
The episode reveals details behind the absence of Dr. Heather Collins. While talking with Louie, Whitaker reveals she moved to Portland, where she became an attending and adopted a baby. Tracy Ifeachor, who plays Collins, was confirmed to not return to the second season in July 2025.

Executive producer John Wells explained that the decision was based on how many staff members can exit their workplace, as it would add realism to the series. He said, "People come and go and people come back... it's a training hospital, and people are at different levels in their training. If we suddenly created it to [be], ‘Oh, it's just one day and then the next day, and then the next day,’ So that everybody could be there forever, I don't think the audience would go along with us in the same way." Originally, Noah Wyle would not be part of the scene, but decided that only hearing the most important part was the best choice, as he would "see the melancholy, the road not traveled." He added, "Hearing that she's about to be a mother, I think, helps him in the sense that she's got closure to her life. Unfortunately, he doesn't have that. And that's what he's searching for."

Sepideh Moafi explained the complex relationship between Baran and Robby, "She sees him as this wild cowboy — the banter, the way he talks to residents, it feels unprofessional, even disrespectful. But ultimately, it's all about the patients. It's all about delivering the best quality of care." Fiona Dourif said that McKay views Baran as "a bit of a foil" to her, adding "She views Al-Hashimi as the other kind, and there's a lot of admiration there too. It's also wonderful to see you know a younger woman in such a powerful role."

== Critical reception ==
"10:00 A.M." received mostly positive reviews from critics. Jesse Schedeen of IGN gave the episode a "great" 8 out of 10 rating and wrote in his verdict, "The Pitt is still early into Season 2, but the series is doing a fine job of balancing moments of humor and character-building with a slowly mounting sense of tension and dread. The new season manages to be funnier than its predecessor, yet there's always the constant reminder that the situation in the ER is heating up and tragedy lurks around every corner. Episode 4 also finds more success in balancing the patients and their caretakers, with plenty of memorable moments for the doctors and nurses of The Pitt."

Caroline Siede of The A.V. Club gave the episode a "B" grade and wrote, "What makes The Pitt so compelling is that its characters are hypercompetent enough to make those small yet critical decisions over and over and over again, even when they're juggling a dozen patients at a time. But that hyper-competence is a learned skill, and “10:00 AM” makes a point of highlighting how it's learned over the course of a doctor's career."

Maggie Fremont of Vulture gave the episode a 4 star rating out of 5 and wrote, "Ogilvie is visibly shaken up, even when Robby calmly tells him that they never remove a foreign body in the ER. There's no way he makes that mistake again, but will it also halt the insufferable know-it-all routine? One can only hope."

Brady Langmann of Esquire wrote, "whether it's for the best that The Pitt maintains medical accuracy right down to seeing off its residents after four years, you do feel the lack of Dr. Collins's presence in the show." Alec Bojalad of Den of Geek wrote, "One thing is for sure on The Pitt and it's that you just cannot win. Whether you're a first-year resident trying to do too much or a seasoned nurse not doing enough, some dickhead on the internet is going to critique your approach."

Johnny Loftus of Decider wrote, "Their professional selves intersect with personal, emotional lives, which also continue in real-time, even when we aren't along for the ride. It's why a detail like Mel's interest in Ren faires feels so consequential." Adam Patla of Telltale TV gave the episode a 4.5 star rating out of 5 and wrote, "Overall, this episode expertly ups the chaos without going overboard too soon. A lot of the doctors' emotional journeys start to take shape here while their environment continues to bubble toward eruption."

Sean T. Collins of The New York Times wrote, "In this spirit, here are three questions on which you're welcome to lay your own money down: How long will it be before Dr. Robby finally talks to Dr. Langdon, his estranged protégé? What will be the event that forces Robby to pull Langdon from triage, where he has been exiled? And what will Dr. Robby decide to do when that happens: forgive Langdon, or freeze him out entirely? This is The Pitt, one of the biggest-hearted shows on television, so forgiveness is the likelier option." Jasmine Blu of TV Fanatic gave the episode a 4 star rating out of 5 and wrote, "Well, that's a tense way to end things! But The Pitt needs to ease up on the cliffhanger endings. They're starting to feel contrived. We don't need them every single time."
