= 6 P.M. =

6 P.M. and variations may refer to:

- A time on the 12-hour clock
- Triple M Perth, originally known by the callsign 6PM, radio station in Australia
- 6pm, album by Phil Manzanera 2004
- 6PM, album by Kings of Tomorrow
- 6pm.com, online shoe and clothing retailer owned by Zappos
- "6:00 P.M." (The Pitt season 1), episode 12 from season 1 of The Pitt
- "6:00 P.M." (The Pitt season 2), episode 12 from season 2 of The Pitt
