= 8:00 P.M. (The Pitt season 2) =

- The Pitt episode
- Episode no.: Season 2 Episode 14
- Directed by: Uta Briesewitz
- Written by: Noah Wyle
- Cinematography by: Johanna Coelho
- Editing by: Joey Reinisch
- Production code: T76.10214
- Original air date: April 9, 2026
- Running time: 41 minutes

Guest appearances
- Shawn Hatosy as Dr. Jack Abbot (special guest star); Amielynn Abellera as Perlah Alawi; Jalen Thomas Brooks as Mateo Diaz; Brandon Mendez Homer as Donnie Donahue; Tony Becker as Sloan Hansen; Eugene Byrd as Lyman Paine; Ayesha Harris as Dr. Parker Ellis; Sofia Hasmik as Dr. Nazely Toomarian; Ken Kirby as Dr. John Shen; Jeff Kober as Duke Ekins; Mary McCormack as Dr. Linda Conley; Alexandra Metz as Dr. Yolanda Garcia; Rusty Schwimmer as Monica Peters; Luke Tennie as Dr. Crus Henderson; Christopher Thornton as Dr. Caleb Jefferson; Tracy Vilar as Lupe Perez; Matt Mercurio as Larry Aldridge; Jermaine Williams as Antoine Dubois; Joshua Dov as Barret Dunkle; Clay Hollander as Elbridge Gerry; Madeline Carroll as Rita Wolcott; Laurie O'Brien as Vera Clymer; Rebekah Tripp as Edith Lynch; Jonathan von Mering as paramedic Bosco; Claude George Jr. as paramedic Otero

Episode chronology
← Previous "7:00 P.M."	Next → "9:00 P.M."

"8:00 P.M." is the fourteenth episode of the second season of the American medical drama television series The Pitt. It is the 29th overall episode of the series and written by lead star Noah Wyle, and directed by co-executive producer Uta Briesewitz. It was released on HBO Max on April 9, 2026.

The series is set in Pittsburgh, following the staff of the Pittsburgh Trauma Medical Hospital ER (nicknamed "The Pitt") during a 15-hour emergency department shift. The series mainly follows Dr. Michael "Robby" Robinavitch, a senior attending still reeling from some traumas. In the episode, Robby confides in Duke about his deepest thoughts, while Dana worries about her recent conversation with him.

The episode received mostly positive reviews from critics, who praised Wyle's performance and the cliffhanger but criticized the episode's pace and disjointed rhythm.

Patrick Ball and Jeff Kober submitted the episode to support their Emmy nominations for Outstanding Supporting Actor in a Drama Series and Outstanding Guest Actor in a Drama Series, respectively.

== Plot ==
Robby informs the day shift staff that they can leave only after they finish digitizing their charts. Whitaker has lost his badge, so Robby assigns McKay, Mel, and medical technology staff Larry Aldridge to work with Santos. Dana worries about Robby's state of mind after their recent conversation and privately urges Abbot to talk with him. New patients include Barret Dunkle, who was stabbed with a flag in a bar fight; Elbridge Gerry, a drugged young man who accidentally shot himself in the head with a gun; and Sloan Hansen, an elderly man who suffered a severe hand laceration while playing tug of war with his family (who visited the ER earlier in the day).

McKay tries to talk with Robby after he and Javadi have disagreement over her TikTok activity, saying that Robby should try to watch some of Javadi's self-care videos. After Mohan shares her guilt about Orlando, Robby tells her not to blame herself and suggests that Orlando made the mistake of "not picking a higher spot to jump from", for which he is later admonished by Dr. Jefferson. Staff treat Edith Lynch, a middle-aged woman experiencing right side chest pain that is found to be a lateral STEMI. Robby realizes that the paramedics who brought in Edith placed her EKG leads too low on her chest.

While searching for his badge, Whitaker encounters Langdon and confronts him over his condescending attitude towards him. Whitaker helps out an elderly woman, Vera Clymer, by ordering a Lyft to take her home; he later receives a surcharge and a complaint, because she made racist comments toward the driver and threw up in the backseat.

Langdon talks with Ellis over his worry that he might have let Robby down. Ellis states Robby is not mad at him, but at himself for failing Langdon. Later, while dealing with Lyman Paine, a car accident victim who drove his car into a telephone pole, Robby encourages Langdon to perform a closed reduction of facet joint to free his airway, despite the risk of quadriplegia and because there is no neurosurgeon available to do the procedure. After successfully performing the procedure, Langdon's confidence is boosted; he then rushes out of the ER to submit a mandated urine screening test.

Robby talks Duke through his upcoming surgery and rehabilitation process. Duke later tries to repair Robby's motorcycle after it was accidentally knocked over by an ambulance. A tearful Robby confides that the actual reason for his sabbatical is because he has lost the will to live, something from which the hospital has provided the sole distraction, and that he hopes to escape his thoughts through a motorcycle trip. Duke believes that Robby is running away from his problems and asks him if that is the legacy he wants to leave for his students.

The two male paramedics who brought in Edith, Bosco and Otero, bring in Rita Wolcott, a young woman who slipped when climbing a fire escape. Robby accuses them of incorrectly placing Edith's EKG leads out of reluctance to touch her breasts, and tells them off in front of the whole staff. Al-Hashimi asks for Robby's opinion on a case of a 40-year-old woman who struggles with a seizure disorder after prolonged viral meningitis in her childhood 35 years ago. Robby then stares at Al-Hashimi, realizing that it is her own case.

== Production ==
=== Development ===
The episode was written by lead star Noah Wyle, and directed by co-executive producer Uta Briesewitz. This marked Wyle's fourth writing credit, and Briesewitz's fourth directing credit.

=== Writing ===
Showrunner R. Scott Gemmill explained the final conversation between Robby and Duke, "Duke can talk to him in a different way than his colleagues can. I think Duke sees through a lot of the bullshit. And this is a guy who's been around a long time, seen a lot, done a lot. I think he sees Robby's struggle. I think he knows that Robby's not in a good place, but he also knows he's a grown man and there's only so much he can do, and Robby's going to have to figure things out for himself, but he pretty much lays it on the line for him."

Regarding Al-Hashimi's diagnosis at the end, Gemmill said "We've seen these characters struggle with mental health, but we haven't really seen them deal with a physical issue like this — something that could derail a career. With Baran, it's that classic "physician, heal thyself" question. What kind of patient is she going to be? Is she in denial about what she's facing? It certainly seems like she's been pushing it to the edge, and now she's confronted with the reality of whether she can continue to practice medicine. It's a really interesting situation, and we'll continue to explore it in Season 3."

== Critical reception ==
"8:00 P.M." received mostly positive reviews from critics. Jesse Schedeen of IGN gave the episode a "great" 8 out of 10 rating and writing in his verdict, "Compared to this point in Season 1, The Pitt is definitely lacking a bit of tension in Season 2. The series has clearly opted for a different storytelling approach, which has its pluses and minuses. But though Episode 14 reverts to the humor-focused approach of early Season 2 episodes, that does serve to make the dramatic moments that remain hit all the harder. Episode 14 is an especially strong showcase for Noah Wyle and Jeff Kober, with each of their characters confronting their own mortality through a different lens. Now it simply remains to be seen how neatly the season finale can tie everything together."

Caroline Siede of The A.V. Club gave the episode a "B" grade and wrote, "Indeed, one of the big fan complaints about The Pitt is how often episodes run under 50 minutes, even though they're ostensibly covering a full real-time hour of a hospital shift. So it's especially notable that this episode clocks in at just 41 minutes — the shortest of the season yet. An extra 10 to 15 minutes could have been put to great use fleshing out Samira's slow downward spiral or Mel's shifting identity as a caretaker for her sister. Instead, “8:00 P.M.” pretty intentionally narrows its focus on Robby, Langdon, and Duke, of all people. Only none of their arcs quite feel complete yet either. And with the somewhat random cliff-hanger reveal that Al-Hashimi seems to have been having absence seizures all day, it makes me wary about how next week's finale is going to juggle its screen time in order to cap off so many arcs at once (not to mention solve the mystery of Baby Jane Doe)."

Maggie Fremont of Vulture gave the episode a perfect 5 star rating out of 5 and wrote, "Over the course of the 8 P.M. hour, several shocking sentences come out of Dr. Robby's mouth. Some thrilling, some chilling, some that will break your heart — all of them made me gasp. And this is really saying something since we're coming off an episode that ends with Robby uttering a shocking sentence when he asks Dana what happens if he doesn't come back in a way that we all know that he isn’t talking about finding a new place of employment." Sean Morrison of Screen Rant wrote, "The penultimate episode of The Pitt season 2 included a bombshell reveal about Dr. Al-Hashimi and finally confirmed what most viewers already knew: Dr. Robby is suicidal. The entire cast of The Pitt has been experiencing mental health problems all season long. Al-Hashimi, however, has mostly been good about hiding her condition, but this week's episode revealed why she's been freezing up while treating some patients."

Johnny Loftus of Decider wrote, "After a Pitt Season 2 marked by the ongoing fraying of Dr. Robby's sense of self, it's like pure energy, watching him push a senior resident past doubt to a place of solutions. The encouragement of his people, and the platforming of improvisational but professional know-how where only uncertainty existed seconds before. This is the nucleus of Robby's professional life. Teaching and guidance have always given him support – we've seen this, even as he has lost his internal compass." Adam Patla of Telltale TV gave the episode a 4.8 star rating out of 5 and wrote, "As we barrel toward the final hour of this shift, everything feels like it's on the table. Yet, in the best possible way, no clear resolution remains in sight. “8:00 PM” leaves us in a precarious state of anxiety where anything and everything could happen."

Sean T. Collins of The New York Times wrote, "I keep coming back to Dr. Robby's statement “I don't know if I want to be here anymore.” Depression is a dark journey, and passive suicidal ideation is one of the hardest stretches of road you'll find on it. Yet it is strangely validating to hear sadness this profound come out of the mouth of such a mensch. This is a disease to which no one, not even the Superman of the Pittsburgh Trauma Medical Center, is immune." Jasmine Blu of TV Fanatic gave the episode a 4.1 star rating out of 5 and wrote, "There's something cathartic about the exact moment when someone is so tired that they have no choice but to keep it real. And The Pitt Season 2 Episode 14 delivers on that front, namely with Robby, who spends so much time trying to hold himself together and stick to this plan."

=== Accolades ===
Award	Category	Nominee(s)	Result	Ref.
Primetime Creative Arts Emmy Awards	Outstanding Guest Actor in a Drama Series	Jeff Kober	Nominated	
Primetime Creative Arts Emmy Awards	Outstanding Sound Mixing for a Comedy or Drama Series (One Hour)	Todd Grace, Edward C. Carr III, Von Varga, Tami Treadwell, and Alex Jongbloed	Nominated	
Primetime Emmy Awards	Outstanding Supporting Actor in a Drama Series	Patrick Ball	Pending	
