= 7 P.M. =

7 P.M. or variants may refer to:

- A time on the 12-hour clock
- The 7PM Project, previous name of the Australian TV program The Project
- "7:PM", a 2005 song by Yann Tiersen on the album Les Retrouvailles
- "7:00 P.M." (The Pitt season 1), episode 13 from season 1 of The Pitt
- "7:00 P.M." (The Pitt season 2), episode 13 from season 2 of The Pitt

== See also ==
- 7 A.M. (disambiguation)
- Saatchya Aat Gharat, or Home Before 7 P.M., a 2004 Indian Marathi-language film
- 7 O' Clock, a 2006 Indian Kannada-language romance film
