= 11:00 A.M. (The Pitt season 2) =

- The Pitt episode
- Episode no.: Season 2 Episode 5
- Directed by: Damian Marcano
- Written by: Simran Baidwan
- Cinematography by: Johanna Coelho
- Editing by: Joey Reinisch
- Production code: T76.10205
- Original air date: February 5, 2026
- Running time: 44 minutes

Guest appearances
- Amielynn Abellera as Perlah Alawi; Brandon Mendez Homer as Donnie Donahue; Kristin Villanueva as Princess; Brittany Allen as Roxie Hamler; Lesley Boone as Lena Handzo; Nancy Linehan Charles as Mrs. Randolph; Irene Choi as Dr. Joy Kwon; Erin Croom as Jayda Davis; Meta Golding as Noelle Hastings; Taylor Handley as Paul Hamler; Ernest Harden Jr. as Louie Cloverfield; Lucas Iverson as James Ogilvie; Alexandra Metz as Dr. Yolanda Garcia; Zack Morris as Jackson Davis; Jett Bednar as Alex Burton; Ned Brower as Jesse Van Horn; Michael Cognata as Allen Billings; Johnath Davis as Ahmad; Loren Escandon as Lorrie Diaz; William Guirola as Orlando Diaz; Lukas Jann as Aaron Burton; Mara Klein as Debbie Cohen; Savannah Ruiz as Ana Diaz; John Lee Ames as Gus Varney; Dayna Beilenson as Tina Yardley

Episode chronology
← Previous "10:00 A.M."	Next → "12:00 P.M."

"11:00 A.M." is the fifth episode of the second season of the American medical drama television series The Pitt. It is the twentieth overall episode of the series and was written by executive producer Simran Baidwan, and directed by co-executive producer Damian Marcano. It was released on HBO Max on February 5, 2026.

The series is set in Pittsburgh, following the staff of the Pittsburgh Trauma Medical Hospital ER (nicknamed "The Pitt") during a 15-hour emergency department shift. The series mainly follows Dr. Michael "Robby" Robinavitch, a senior attending still reeling from some traumas. In the episode, Robby treats Debbie without trying to get Langdon involved, while more Westbridge victims are diverted to the hospital.

The episode received critical acclaim, with critics praising the performances, scenes between Robby and Langdon, and cliffhanger.

== Plot ==
Langdon and Donnie take Debbie to a Trauma Two room for further treatment, with Robby suggesting that her state could stem from a SIRS. Debbie's boss calls demanding that she return to work, dismissing her medical emergency; Robby threatens the boss with a lawsuit before hanging up. After conducting more tests, they conclude she is developing a severe sepsis, although Langdon states this is solvable. Despite his contributions, Robby dismisses Langdon from the case, and privately instructs nurse Jesse to prepare for a possible intubation as her blood oxygen drops.

Gus Varney, an inmate from SCI Jones Forge, is brought in after being assaulted in prison, but police officers refuse to take the cuffs off for treatment. Whitaker and Mel struggle to properly treat him, especially when the stitches struggle to attach themselves to Gus' skin. They later find he has anemia, which Al-Hashimi attributes to limited dietary options in prison. Langdon and Donnie treat a young man, Alex Burton, who has a large burn on his chest after his brother's attempt at branding him with the Pittsburgh Penguins logo using dry ice at Alex's request.

Santos tries to record her charting, but she is often interrupted by the arrival of new patients. She then supervises Ogilvie. They examine Mrs. Randolph, an elderly woman with fecal impaction. Another patient, a homeless woman Tina Yardley, is revealed to have tuberculosis, and Ogilvie is forced to wear a mask due to possible exposure. After a while, Santos concludes he does not have tuberculosis, but warns that doctors are trained to consider an infection in their shift as a possibility. She later gets Whitaker to help Ogilvie with a fecal disimpaction on Mrs. Randolph. Al-Hashimi recommends to Santos a generative AI app to expedite charting, which Robby immediately criticizes.

Noelle informs Orlando's family about healthcare options, which could help reduce their bills by 40%. Orlando is still worried about the expense as he has to stay multiple days in the hospital, but Joy suggests sending him to medical surgery. Noelle consults and manages to provide a med treatment that could reduce the bills by two-thirds, with Orlando's family promising to secure the money. Afterwards, Mohan praises Joy for her solution. Joy explains this came from the struggles of her family when her uninsured grandmother died from leukemia.

Allen Billings, the patient who dislocated his shoulder, is brought back to the Pitt after the code-black at Westbridge. Debbie's condition worsens, turning to necrotizing fasciitis, putting her life at risk. Garcia insists on a CT scan to verify her condition, but Robby, arguing that the infection will worsen in that time, cuts open a swollen area on Debbie's leg, causing grey fluid to come pouring out, indicating tissue death and confirming NF. McKay treats a woman, Roxie Hamler, in advanced cancer stage, and is forced to place her in a bedpan after she is unable to move to a wheelchair. Louie flatlines in his room, alerting Langdon and Robby. As they wait for an intubation tray, they try to revive Louie.

== Production ==
=== Development ===
The episode was written by executive producer Simran Baidwan, and directed by co-executive producer Damian Marcano. This marked Baidwan's fourth writing credit, and Marcano's fifth directing credit.

=== Writing ===
Supriya Ganesh said that Mohan's storyline is part of a deeper development to her character, "She's so hyper-focused on her job that she doesn't even really know, outside of that, what relationships she has or what friendships she has,. And so I really think that, hopefully, by the end of this day, she is grappling with that in some way."

Gerran Howell also said that Whitaker is aware of some of Langdon's actions due to his stay with Santos and that it could lead to some problems in the future, "I imagine Santos has just been chewing his ear off and kind of venting quite a lot about Langdon. So when he comes in, I think that's instantly, ‘Oh, I've heard so much gossip and bad things about you. It's kind of weird you being here right now.' And I know how much it affects Santos, his presence, because it really caused some friction on Santos' first shift. So I know that him coming in is going to really throw a lot of people, but Santos in particular off her kind of equilibrium. I can see that straight away."

== Critical reception ==
"11:00 A.M." received critical acclaim. Jesse Schedeen of IGN gave the episode an "amazing" 9 out of 10 rating and wrote in his verdict, "Episode 5 of The Pitt Season 2 is the strongest installment so far, benefiting from a proper blend of medical and interpersonal drama on one hand and some much-needed humor on the other. Scatalogical humor, even. Episode 5 also succeeds in addressing some of the niggling concerns about the season so far and giving several key characters the focus they deserve. We're only a third of the way through Season 2, but things are rapidly heating up."

Caroline Siede of The A.V. Club gave the episode a "B+" grade and wrote, "We're officially a third of the way through this shift/season, and while the train isn't fully off the tracks yet, this “normal” day is starting to get a whole lot more complicated. And with dear, sweet Louie coding, there's no signs of things getting easier next hour either."

Maggie Fremont of Vulture gave the episode a 3 star rating out of 5 and wrote, "While Orlando's story is anger-inducing, if you're like me, you may be looking around at The Pitt's episode count and wondering when the tear-inducing storylines might kick in. Make me weep, show!"

Brady Langmann of Esquire wrote, "Leading up to season 2, episode 5, "11:00 A.M.," The Pitt has thrown just about every bodily fluid known to man on us all: blood, urine, puke, mucus, sweat, pus. (To be fair, Whitaker absorbed most of those blows.) But The Pitt has always pulled its punches, for the most part, on the... back end of things. Until tonight." Alec Bojalad of Den of Geek wrote, "Based on the final moments of “11:00 A.M.,” however, it might not even take Robby and Langdon that long to reconcile or at least work better together. If the two can't put aside their differences to save a flatlining Louie, then Motorcycle Mike might need that sabbatical even more than previously realized."

Johnny Loftus of Decider wrote, "His good-timing nature is so appealing, Dr. Robby was even gonna sneak one of their favorite repeat patients a Fourth of July beer. Until he arrives in the trauma bay to find Langdon hovering above Louie and calling for a crash cart. They team up to begin an intense round of chest compressions. Robby's rift with Langdon will have to wait." Adam Patla of Telltale TV gave the episode a 4.5 star rating out of 5 and wrote, "Between this and the revelation that Robby's bounced between therapists, it's clear he struggles to do the work he needs to thrive. Despite his breakdown last season, Robby hasn't fully learned that he cannot avoid addressing difficult things which, unfortunately means it looks like he's going to learn it again this season."

Sean T. Collins of The New York Times wrote, "This episode is both gory and gross even by the high bar The Pitt has already established. But viewers whose resolve and stomach are strong enough to stay tuned are rewarded with real movement in the Robby-Langdon story line, the most dramatic dangling plot thread of Season 1 and the most conspicuously unresolved conflict thus far in Season 2." Jasmine Blu of TV Fanatic gave the episode a 4.2 star rating out of 5 and wrote, "It's happening; The Pitt is bracing us for maximum heartbreak this season, and I am not prepared."
