= 7:00 P.M. (The Pitt season 2) =

- The Pitt episode
- Episode no.: Season 2 Episode 13
- Directed by: Damian Marcano
- Written by: Joe Sachs
- Cinematography by: Johanna Coelho
- Editing by: Tamara Luciano
- Production code: T76.10213
- Original air date: April 2, 2026
- Running time: 48 minutes

Guest appearances
- Shawn Hatosy as Dr. Jack Abbot (special guest star); Amielynn Abellera as Perlah Alawi; Jalen Thomas Brooks as Mateo Diaz; Brandon Mendez Homer as Donnie Donahue; Charles Baker as Troy Digby; Meta Golding as Noelle Hastings; Ayesha Harris as Dr. Parker Ellis; Sofia Hasmik as Dr. Nazely Toomarian; Laëtitia Hollard as Emma Nolan; Lucas Iverson as James Ogilvie; Ken Kirby as Dr. John Shen; Jeff Kober as Duke Ekins; Mary McCormack as Dr. Linda Conley; Alexandra Metz as Dr. Yolanda Garcia; Geoffrey Owens as Dr. Clay Barrett; Rusty Schwimmer as Monica Peters; Luke Tennie as Dr. Crus Henderson; Loren Escandon as Lorrie Diaz; William Guirola as Orlando Diaz; Aivan Alexander Uttapa as Grady Barnhill; Tianna Mendez as Naomi Barnhill; Sara Wyle as Ashley Davis; Cathryn Dylan Ortiz as Brenda Azurmendi

Episode chronology
← Previous "6:00 P.M."	Next → "8:00 P.M."

"7:00 P.M." is the thirteenth episode of the second season of the American medical drama television series The Pitt. It is the 28th overall episode of the series and was written by executive producer Joe Sachs, and directed by co-executive producer Damian Marcano. It was released on HBO Max on April 2, 2026.

The series is set in Pittsburgh, following the staff of the Pittsburgh Trauma Medical Hospital ER (nicknamed "The Pitt") during a 15-hour emergency department shift. The series mainly follows Dr. Michael "Robby" Robinavitch, a senior attending still reeling from some traumas. In the episode, the staff is forced to stay past their shift to scan charts, while Robby and Dana have another heavy confrontation.

The episode received positive reviews from critics, who praised the episode's transition into the night shift and performances.

Gerran Howell submitted the episode to support his Emmy nomination for Outstanding Supporting Actor in a Drama Series.

== Plot ==
Orlando is diagnosed with basilar skull fracture. Mohan is too distracted by Orlando's condition to help, so Javadi assists Dr. Linda Conley, the Chief of Neurosurgery, in placing an EVD. Orlando's wife Lorrie reveals that she never knew he had left the hospital, making Mohan feel guilty and responsible. Robby informs Lorrie that due to possible severe brain injury, Orlando could either face up to a year of physical recovery or even round-the-clock nursing care. Robby later openly speculates that Orlando's fall was an attempted suicide due to his mounting medical debt; Dana chastises him for his lack of discretion.

As the night shift staff arrives, the hospital's computer systems finally come back online, to everyone's delight. Santos and Whitaker get assigned with scanning the medical charts into the Electronic Health Record. They skirt around the topic of their living arrangements. Santos helps McKay examine and diagnose a jaundiced health-conscious woman, Ashley Davis, with turmeric overdose, while Whitaker removes jewelry magnets from a girl's nasal septum. Santos finds out from the restored computer system that Austin Green, the patient with ruptured abdominal aortic aneurysm, (Note: As seen in "5:00 P.M.".) died in surgery, leaving Mohan further devastated and Ogilvie emotionally shattered at the ambulance bay. Whitaker finds Ogilvie and shares his experience with a patient who died on his first day at the Pitt, telling him that one eventually comes to terms with the amount of death in the ER. Ogilvie doubts whether he can handle emergency medicine and contemplates a move to primary or pediatric care; Whitaker tells him to go home and rest before making a major career decision.

Langdon and Mel help the night shift treat Grady Barnhill, an asthmatic boy who was having difficulty breathing. He initially gets better with Aerogen, but when his condition suddenly worsens, Langdon almost fatally intubates him before a night shift senior resident, Dr. Crus Henderson, diagnoses him with pneumothorax and performs a thoracentesis. Langdon feels guilty he almost killed Grady, wondering whether he is ready to be back. Mel comforts him, relating it with her experience at the deposition. Robby grows concerned after witnessing Al-Hashimi dissociate while examining Grady, and asks Mohan whether she has noticed Al-Hashimi behaving unusually; Mohan recounts Al-Hashimi similarly freezing when examining the abandoned baby at the beginning of the shift. (Note: As seen in "7:00 A.M.".)

Dana and Emma give Digby a shave and haircut, making him emotional with gratitude. Noelle bids Robby farewell for his trip. Robby learns from Duke's CT scan result that he has an ascending thoracic aortic aneurysm. Cardiothoracic surgeon Dr. Clay Barrett informs Robby that Duke will have to wait until next week before he gets the surgery. When Robby gets agitated, Dana privately talks with him, urging him to leave as his shift is over. Robby lashes out, mentioning his mother who left him and telling Dana that he is reluctant to leave given his concerns regarding several members of his staff, including Dana herself. When Dana assures him they will manage in his absence, Robby retorts with "what if I don't come back?" and exits, leaving her speechless.

== Production ==
=== Development ===
The episode was written by executive producer Joe Sachs, and directed by co-executive producer Damian Marcano. This marked Sachs' seventh writing credit, and Marcano's eighth directing credit.

=== Casting ===
Mary McCormack makes a guest appearance as Dr. Linda Conley, the hospital's Chief of Neurosurgery. McComarck had previously worked with Noah Wyle at a New York City Roundabout Theater reading back in the late 1990s, before having a recurring role in ER. On her preparation, McCormack said, "You don't have a lot of time to learn. They brought me in a few days before I did it, just because that's when they weren't on that set and when they had a doctor ready to work with me. But you go through it a few times and that's it, which is why I filmed it, so I could really spend the next three days running it in my head. These guys are doing it every day, but it's very impressive."

One week prior to its airing, Geoffrey Owens was reported to guest star in the episode as Dr. Clay Barrett, a cardio-thoracic surgeon.

Sara Wells, Wyle's real-life wife, makes a guest appearance as a patient in the episode. She said, "He could tell I was a bit nervous because this is his sandbox. I wanted to make sure I honored the show and brought my A-game."

== Critical reception ==
"7:00 P.M." received highly positive reviews from critics, who praised its performances and writing, particularly the argument between Robby and Dana. Maggie Fremont of Vulture gave the episode a perfect 5 star rating out of 5 and wrote, "Aside from night shift fangirling, it's also great these guys are here because holy hell does the day shift need to go home. At best, they're all physically exhausted, at worst, they are in the middle of various mental-health crises. But even more than simply relieving the day shift, having fresh eyes in the ED is beneficial for both in-world purposes — some of these well-rested doctors might be able to catch a breakdown before it happens — but also it adds a nice little perspective change for the audience, where we can be reminded of how doctors functioning at their best might just look. The comparison is startling."

Caroline Siede of The A.V. Club gave the episode a "B+" grade and wrote, "Given how quick he was to jump on Samira for her own “mommy issues,” however, there's a good chance we've finally found a missing puzzle piece to unlock Robby's internal arc over the final two episodes of the season. Right now, though, his immediate struggle is clear: Staying in the hospital might kill him but leaving might too. Like Vladimir and Estragon, Robby is stuck. The hospital is his underworld. The question is whether someone is coming to lead him out."

Jesse Schedeen of IGN was more mixed, giving the episode a "good" 7 out of 10 rating and writing in his verdict, "The Pitt Season 2 finds itself in a bit of a weird place in Episode 13. Rather than moving toward any sort of dramatic crescendo, the series takes a big step back and allows the tension in the ER to ease off. We can hope that this is all part of some larger plan for the final leg of the season, but it's a bit frustrating nonetheless. Still, there's plenty to enjoy this week, particularly with the renewed focus on the Orlando Diaz case and the big blowup between Robby and Dana. But can the series restore its momentum in the final two episodes?"

Sean Morrison of Screen Rant wrote, "Robby and Dana continued their fight in this week's episode of The Pitt, and we got an even clearer look at Robby's deteriorating mental state. The entire cast of The Pitt has been struggling, and many of the doctors and nurses have to stay late to transition Pittsburgh Trauma Medical Center from paper records back to digital ones. As the end of the shift draws nearer, the nerves and emotions of its doctors are also reaching a breaking point." Adam Patla of Telltale TV gave the episode a 4.5 star rating out of 5 and wrote, "Sometimes, we simply need affirmation. In the grand scheme of an environment like the Pitt, that may seem inconsequential, but “7:00 PM” allows for it to make just as big an impact as these more dramatic cases. Care manifests in big and small ways and both leave a lasting impression."

Sean T. Collins of The New York Times wrote, "Then he hits her with the question the show has hinted at all season long. “Yeah? What If I don't come back?” The line leaves Dana uncharacteristically speechless, her mouth and body hanging slack. With that one comment, she goes from the E.R.’s den mother to looking like a scared, sad little girl. (This is Dana, however, so I expect her to snap out of it by the time the next episode begins.)" Jasmine Blu of TV Fanatic gave the episode a 4 star rating out of 5 and wrote, "This hour is deceptively quiet and understated, and puts you on edge because of that. It's tense in these hours right before everything gives out completely, and that's disquieting and uncomfortable."
