= 6:00 P.M. (The Pitt season 2) =

- The Pitt episode
- Episode no.: Season 2 Episode 12
- Directed by: Amanda Marsalis
- Written by: Danny Hogan; R. Scott Gemmill
- Cinematography by: Johanna Coelho
- Editing by: Mark Strand
- Production code: T76.10212
- Original air date: March 26, 2026
- Running time: 51 minutes

Guest appearances
- Amielynn Abellera as Perlah Alawi; Jalen Thomas Brooks as Mateo Diaz; Brandon Mendez Homer as Donnie Donahue; Kristin Villanueva as Princess Dela Cruz; Christine Avila as Frida Cohen; Charles Baker as Troy Digby; Irene Choi as Joy Kwon; Dann Florek as Eddie Cohen; Laëtitia Hollard as Emma Nolan; Ken Kirby as Dr. John Shen; Jeff Kober as Duke Ekins; Alexandra Metz as Dr. Yolanda Garcia; Cathryn Dylan Ortiz as Brenda Azurmendi; Rusty Schwimmer as Monica Peters; Travis Van Winkle as Curtis Larson; Britney Young as Carrie Cohen; Keenan Henson as Oliver Haas; Iker García as Mason Haas; Shane Nelson as Dante Casella; Brian Norris as Marcus Casella; Anthony D. Washington as Dorion Cole; Meghana Mudiyam as Dr. Megan Nordt; William Guirola as Orlando Diaz

Episode chronology
← Previous "5:00 P.M."	Next → "7:00 P.M."

"6:00 P.M." is the twelfth episode of the second season of the American medical drama television series The Pitt. It is the 27th overall episode of the series and was written by Danny Hogan and series creator R. Scott Gemmill, and directed by Amanda Marsalis. It was released on HBO Max on March 26, 2026.

The series is set in Pittsburgh, following the staff of the Pittsburgh Trauma Medical Hospital ER (nicknamed "The Pitt") during a 15-hour emergency department shift. The series mainly follows Dr. Michael "Robby" Robinavitch, a senior attending still reeling from some traumas. In the episode, the staff prepares to end their shift, but Dana confronts Robby over his actions over the day.

The episode received critical acclaim, with Katherine LaNasa earning high praise for her performance in the episode.

== Plot ==
As patient Curtis Larson puts Emma in a headlock, Dana intervenes and sedates him with Versed, leaving Larson with a bloody nose that Dana refuses to explain. Dana is upset with Robby when he questions her use of force and for administering a controlled substance outside protocol.

Having witnessed the confrontation between Langdon and Santos, Al-Hashimi informs Robby that she will recommend having two attendings in the ER at all times, as she is concerned that Robby cannot handle everything by himself. Robby reveals that Santos reported Langdon for stealing drugs from the ER, shocking Al-Hashimi, who later behaves coldly towards Langdon and corrects him during procedures while tending to Oliver Haas, a man who was brought in with pulmonary edema after a delayed kidney dialysis. Robby fast-tracks Duke's CT scan and confides in him that the reason for his sabbatical is that he wants an excuse to leave the ER.

Mohan and Mel examine an elderly woman, Frida Cohen, who received a hairline fracture in her hip after her husband Eddie accidentally hit her with their car. Mohan, worried about Eddie's condition as well, conducts a Romberg's test on him and notices he has issues maintaining his balance. Given their advanced age and Frida's injuries, Mohan suggests assisted living, but learns that the Cohens' daughter Carrie has been unsuccessfully suggesting the same to them. Mohan and Mel find out later that the interactions between different drugs prescribed to Eddie by various doctors have impaired his daily functioning, and come up with a plan for him to receive at-home care rather than going to a facility. Robby later echoes Al-Hashimi's suggestion to Mohan that she work in geriatrics, but cites her "predisposition to the pace", offending her.

Santos and Joy treat Dante Casella, a young man who was involved in a fireworks explosion, resulting in a deep head laceration and pericardial tamponade, the latter of which Santos drains with an apical pericardiocentesis guided by Robby. Santos later secretly takes scalpel kits, suggesting that she is contemplating self-harm again. Santos and Whitaker discuss Langdon, Robby and Garcia; Whitaker tells her that he will not move out if she admits that she likes being roommates with him.

Robby talks with Dana while she is on a smoke break, deducing that the Versed has always been ready in her pocket in the event Doug Driscoll ever returned, (Note: Driscoll assaulted Dana in the first season's "3:00 P.M.") and warns that she could lose her nursing license for how she dealt with Larson. Dana in turn confronts Robby over his erratic behavior throughout the day, concerned that Robby may be suicidal, and urges him to forgive Langdon, arguing that Robby's real anger is directed at himself. She also admonishes Robby to stop tormenting himself over whether the ER will survive in his absence, accusing him of having a martyr complex.

McKay is assigned to both Emma and Larson. She confirms that Emma is physically fine and later informs Larson that his lab results show high levels of alcohol and cocaine, forming cocaethylene that likely sent him into a psychotic state. Larson denies harming Emma and becomes aggressive when McKay tells him that the police will need to speak to him and that he could be facing charges. She then gets emotional over the blanket that Roxie's family left behind. Later, just like Dana, McKay also says to Robby that his behavior throughout the day is unusual, implying that he is courting death.

As the staff prepares for the night shift handover, Al-Hashimi informs Robby that the two hospitals affected by the cyberattack have paid their respective ransoms, and the Pitt's systems will be back online soon. Joy leaves when her shift ends; Langdon insists that she stay to help during the crisis, but Joy argues that the staff need better boundaries. Robby also prepares to leave after Duke finally gets his turn for the CT scan, but Orlando Diaz is brought in after suffering a fall. (Note: Orlando was treated by Mohan earlier in the season, but left the hospital during "1:00 P.M." against medical advice due to fears over the cost implications of his treatment.)

== Production ==
=== Development ===
The episode was written by assistant writer Danny Hogan and series creator R. Scott Gemmill, and directed by Amanda Marsalis. It marked Hogan's first writing credit, Gemmill's tenth writing credit, and Marsalis' fifth directing credit.

=== Writing ===
Regarding McKay's emotional reaction to Roxie's blanket, Fiona Dourif explained, "I looked at it like it was Cassie confronting the fact that we're all going to die. It was specific that [Roxie] was exactly my age. She had children, like [McKay does]. She also had a family, which [McKay doesn't]. So, there was a lot to think about. It came down to this question of, "What do I want my life to look like when I die?"" She also added her thoughts on McKay's conversation with Robby, "He's like, “It's fine. It doesn't matter,” but yet he's doing what Cassie perceives as something quite reckless. If you don't know that you're doing that, consequences can follow that can be life-threatening. I think she's worried about his genuine safety, actually."

Supriya Ganesh explained the ending and its impact on Mohan: "This is literally her worst nightmare. It's like calling back so much to how she lost her father, and there’s been so many reminders of that. She does whatever she can to focus on other things to not process it, but I think it does catch up to her. Hour 13 is just an intense, intense episode."

== Critical reception ==
"6:00 P.M." received critical acclaim. Jesse Schedeen of IGN gave the episode a "great" 8 out of 10 rating and wrote in his verdict, "The Pitt is only becoming more and more stressful an experience as the push to the Season 2 finale continues. Episode 12 shines best when it showcases various doctors and nurses reaching their respective breaking points. Once again, Katherine LaNasa shines brightest amid an all-around talented cast. Only the fact that this week's crop of medical cases is relatively underwhelming serves to hold “6:00 PM” back slightly. But it doesn't seem as though that'll continue to be a problem for the series in the next chapter."

Caroline Siede of The A.V. Club gave the episode an "A–" grade and wrote, "While “6:00 P.M.” isn't a happy episode of The Pitt, exactly, it's an appreciably unexpected way to wrap up the official final hour of the dayshift. Last season, our doctors stuck around for three extra hours because they were in the middle of a mass-casualty event in which dozens of people would have died without them. Here, however, they're sticking around to tie up loose ends—logistically but even more so emotionally. With so much hanging in the balance, Robby and his staff certainly aren't out of the woods yet. But if the cyber systems can come back online before this day is over, maybe the staff of PTMC can experience their own emotional reboot too."

Maggie Fremont of Vulture gave the episode a perfect 5 star rating out of 5 and wrote, "Pointing out what we've all been thinking since the premiere: It's not exactly subtle that the place he's riding off to is called “Head-Smashed-In.” Mercifully, he gets pulled away for an incoming trauma before he can be too much of a smart ass back. Dana turns away from him, but we get the full view of her as she tries to hold back tears and [LaNasa] wins her second Emmy Award." Sean Morrison of Screen Rant wrote, "Dana came to Emma's rescue in The Pitt season 2, episode 12, but there was also plenty of mystery and drama surrounding the drunken attacker that needs an explanation. After a very chaotic and harrowing string of episodes, the cast of The Pitt finally caught a break this week. Pittsburgh Trauma Medical Center is going back online, the night shift is coming in, and things are finally starting to look more hopeful."

Johnny Loftus of Decider wrote, "So, even with Duke still waiting on his CT, that won't fill the three episodes that still remain in Season 2 of The Pitt. Why doesn't it feel like this guy's ready to leave, even though he's been ready to leave since he first arrived 11 hours ago? It's like the Pitt itself has Robby in a headlock." Adam Patla of Telltale TV gave the episode a 4.2 star rating out of 5 and wrote, "This argument sets a precarious stage for the final three episodes of this season. Dana is stubborn and surely won't let Robby just walk away. But, as we can see, he's hurdling toward another breaking point that he may not be able to come back from in several regards."

Sean T. Collins of The New York Times wrote, "in the dozen episodes we’ve seen this season so far, I can hear a steady, ominous drumbeat beneath the din. Looking over my notes, rereading these reviews, I see myself asking one question, over and over: Are Robby and Dana, the heart and soul of the E.R., ever going to return after this shift from hell is over?" Jasmine Blu of TV Fanatic gave the episode a 4.8 star rating out of 5 and wrote, "That may have been the best episode of the season. The Pitt has a way of really bringing it home towards the final stretch, and The Pitt Season 2 Episode 12 was a must-watch. It's a fraught, tense, delicious unpacking of emotions that left everyone spiraling, crashing, clashing, on edge, and exposed. Just how we like it!"

=== Accolades ===
TVLine named Katherine LaNasa the "Performer of the Week" for the week of March 28, 2026, for her performance in the episode. The site wrote, "LaNasa was at her very best in Episode 12, as Dana came down from Emma's assault and contended with an equally acerbic Robby. Noah Wyle was also excellent here, navigating new terrain opposite LaNasa as Robby and Dana locked horns — two deeply damaged characters who refused to face their trauma, neither of whom wanted to hear the other say it out loud. What made Wyle so superb here, however, was how he revved up LaNasa, resulting in career-best work from the onetime character actress, who already struck gold at the Emmys last fall and, with this hour, has all but assured herself a repeat nomination."
