= Uta Briesewitz =

German cinematographer and television director (born 1967)

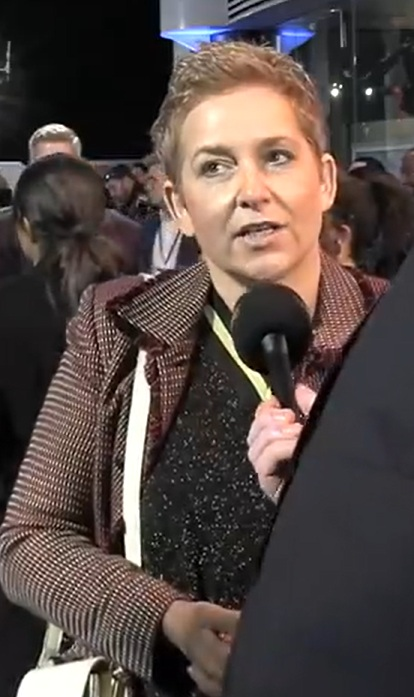
- Briesewitz at The Wheel of Time London Premiere 2021
- Born: 1967 (age 58–59); Leverkusen, West Germany
- Education: American Film Institute (MFA)
- Occupations: Cinematographer, television director
- Years active: 1998–present

Uta Briesewitz (born 1967) is a German cinematographer and television director.

== Biography ==
Briesewitz was born in Leverkusen, Germany.

She cultivated a preference for French Nouvelle Vague and Italian cinema at an early age, watching them on German television. In an interview, she recounted that Francois Truffaut's Day for Night, The Story of Adele H and The Man Who Loved Women, were some of the films that made strong impressions on her as a child. Later, Briesewitz considered becoming a painter, but decided it was too isolated as a career.

She had an internship with a German television company, before she applied and completed a cinematography program at AFI Conservatory.

In 2007 she won a Women in Film Crystal + Lucy Awards in the category Kodak Vision award.

== Filmography ==
=== Cinematographer ===
Film

Year	Title	Director
1998	Getting Personal	Ron Burrus
1998	Next Stop Wonderland	Brad Anderson
1999	Love Stinks	Jeff Franklin
2001	Seven and a Match	Derek Simonds
2001	Session 9	Brad Anderson
2002	XX/XY	Austin Chick
2002	The Scoundrel's Wife	Glen Pitre
2006	The TV Set	Jake Kasdan
2007	Walk Hard: The Dewey Cox Story	Jake Kasdan
2010	Vanishing on 7th Street	Brad Anderson
2011	Arthur	Jason Winer
2015	Freaks of Nature	Robbie Pickering

Documentary film

Year	Title	Director
1998	Baby, It's You	Anne Makepeace

Television

Year	Title	Director	Notes
1999	Undressed	Jamie Babbit; James Brett; Jonathan Buss; George Verschoor; Chris Slater; Dale Roy Robinson	30 episodes
2000	American Masters	Anne Makepeace	Episode "Edward Curtis: Coming to Light"
2002-2004	The Wire		29 episodes
2004-2005	LAX	Anthony and Joe Russo; Scott Brazil; Félix Enríquez Alcalá; Craig Zisk	12 episodes
2006	What About Brian	Anthony and Joe Russo; Dan Lerner	Episode "Pilot"
2006	Thief	Dean White; John David Coles	5 episodes
2007	John from Cincinnati	Mark Tinker	Episode "His Visit, Day One"
2009	United States of Tara	Craig Gillespie	Episode "Pilot"
2009-2011	Hung		19 episodes
2012	Ben and Kate	Jake Kasdan	Episode "Pilot"
2013	True Blood	Romeo Tirone	Episode "Life Matters"
2015	Fresh Off the Boat	Lynn Shelton	Episode "Pilot"
2015	Weird Loners	Jake Kasdan	Episode "Weird Pilot"
2015	Complications	Matt Nix	Episode "Pilot"

TV movies

Year	Title	Director
1999	Return of the Eagle	William A. Anderson
2000	Bear Wars	William A. Anderson
2003	Homeless to Harvard: The Liz Murray Story	Peter Levin
2006	Sixty Minute Man	Jon Avnet
2007	Life Support	Nelson George
2009	Washingtonienne	Mark Mylod
2011	Untitled Allan Loeb Project	James Steven Sadwith
2011	Spring/Fall	Jake Kasdan
2013	The List	Ruben Fleischer

=== Director ===
Film

- American Sweatshop (2025) (Also executive producer)

Television

Year	Title	Episode(s)
2009-2011	Hung	"Sing It Again, Ray" or "Home Plate"
2009-2011	Hung	"Take the Cake" or "Are You Packing?"
2009-2011	Hung	"Money on the Floor"
2012	Weeds	"God Willing and the Creek Don't Rise"
2012	Suburgatory	"The Wishbone"
2013-2017	Orange Is the New Black	"Tit Punch"
2013-2017	Orange Is the New Black	"Don't Make Me Come Back There"
2013-2017	Orange Is the New Black	"Piece of Shit"
2013-2017	Orange Is the New Black	"Full Bush, Half Snickers"
2014	House of Lies	"Pushback"
2014-2015	Awkward	"Girl Rules"
2014-2015	Awkward	"Over the Hump"
2014-2015	Awkward	"Say No to the Dress"
2014-2015	Awkward	"Reality Does Not Bite"
2014-2016	Jane the Virgin	"Chapter Two"
2014-2016	Jane the Virgin	"Chapter Seventeen"
2014-2016	Jane the Virgin	"Chapter Thirty"
2014-2016	Jane the Virgin	"Chapter Thirty-Three"
2014-2016	Jane the Virgin	"Chapter Thirty-Six"
2015	Unreal	"Mother"
2015	Unreal	"Wife"
2015	Agent X	"The Sacrifice"
2015-2016	The 100	"Bodyguard of Lies"
2015-2016	The 100	"Stealing Fire"
2015-2018	Jessica Jones	"AKA I've Got the Blues"
2015-2018	Jessica Jones	"AKA Playland"
2016	Mad Dogs	"Hat"
2016	Girlfriends' Guide to Divorce	"Rule No. 36: If You Can't Stand the Heat, You're Cooked"
2016	Fear the Walking Dead	"Pablo & Jessica"
2016-2018	This Is Us	"The Trip"
2016-2018	This Is Us	"That'll Be the Day"
2017	Lethal Weapon	"Brotherly Love"
2017	Iron Fist	"Under Leaf Pluck Lotus"
2017	Black Sails	"XXXVI."
2017	The Defenders	"Take Shelter"
2017-2018	The Deuce	"What Kind of Bad?"
2017-2018	The Deuce	"What Big Ideas"
2018	Altered Carbon	"The Wrong Man"
2018	Altered Carbon	"Clash by Night"
2018	Here and Now	"It's Coming"
2018	Here and Now	"If a Deer Shits in the Woods"
2018	Westworld	"Kiksuya"
2019	Stranger Things	"Chapter Five: The Flayed"
2019	Stranger Things	"Chapter Six: E Pluribus Unum"
2021	In Treatment	"Eladio - Week 3"
2021	In Treatment	"Colin - Week 3"
2021	In Treatment	"Laila - Week 3"
2021	In Treatment	"Brooke - Week 3"
2021	The Wheel of Time	"Leavetaking"
2021	The Wheel of Time	"Shadow's Waiting"
2021	CSI: Vegas	"Legacy" (Also executive producer)
2023	Black Mirror	"Mazey Day"
2023	Fellow Travelers	"Beyond Measure"
2023	Fellow Travelers	"Make It Easy"
2024	The Old Man	"XI"
2024	The Old Man	"XIII"
2025	Severance	"Attila"
2025	Severance	"The After Hours"
2025	All's Fair	"This Is Me Trying"
2025	All's Fair	"Divorce Is Like a Death"
2026	The Pitt	"9:00 A.M."
2026	The Pitt	"1:00 P.M."
2026	The Pitt	"5:00 P.M."
2026	The Pitt	"8:00 P.M."

Ref.:
