= Attending physician statement =

An attending physician statement (APS) is a report by a physician, hospital, or medical facility that has treated, or is currently treating, a person seeking insurance. In traditional underwriting, an APS is one of the most frequently ordered additional sources of medical background information. The APS is one of the more expensive underwriting requirements, as well as the most time consuming. It is usually completed only when a doctor has free time, as their primary focus is caring for patients. The insurance cycle time is often severely hampered by the APS, as it could take weeks or even months to obtain. Once obtained, it can be laborious to review and summarize, as APS reports can be large documents containing an in-depth medical history information that may or may not be relevant.

== Overview ==
In structured underwriting, the data capture process with the proposed insured is asked very detailed questions to attempt to reduce the number of attending physician's statements necessary. However, many medical conditions require supporting evidence from the physician. This is where an APS Summary can assist the underwriter in evaluating the proposed insured's medical risk(s). The APS summaries, however, are only as good as the underwriter's experience, which varies widely from person to person. Additionally, APS summaries, when processed without a “template structure” guiding the information gathered from the APS, often yield inconsistent or miss critical underwriting information. Either inconsistent or missing underwriting information will compromise the risk analysis process.

By leveraging a seasoned underwriter's knowledge and experiences, scripts can be built that ensure the appropriate medical information is captured and recorded from the APS document. This is done by creating scripts that prompt the person summarizing the APS to enter all pertinent specific medical condition uncovered.
