= 7 A.M. =

7 A.M. or variants may refer to:

- A time on the 12-hour clock
- 7AM, a 2010 album by Teengirl Fantasy
- "7 a.m.", a song by The Fireman from the 1998 album Rushes
- "7 am", a song by Dirty Vegas from the 2002 album Dirty Vegas
- "7 heures du matin", a 1967 song by Jacqueline Taïeb
- "7AM", a song by Lil Uzi Vert from the 2015 album Luv Is Rage
- "7:00 A.M." (The Pitt season 1), episode 1 from season 1 of The Pitt
- "7:00 A.M." (The Pitt season 2), episode 1 from season 2 of The Pitt
- 7am, a news podcast by Schwartz Media

== See also ==
- 7 P.M. (disambiguation)
- 7 O' Clock, a 2006 Indian Kannada-language romance film
