= 7:00 P.M. (The Pitt season 1) =

- The Pitt episode
- Episode no.: Season 1 Episode 13
- Directed by: Damian Marcano
- Written by: Joe Sachs; R. Scott Gemmill
- Cinematography by: Johanna Coelho
- Editing by: Annie Eifrig
- Production code: T76.10113
- Original air date: March 27, 2025
- Running time: 44 minutes

Guest appearances
- Shawn Hatosy as Dr. Jack Abbot (special guest star); Amielynn Abellera as Perlah; Jalen Thomas Brooks as Mateo Diaz; Brandon Mendez Homer as Donnie; Kristin Villanueva as Princess; Jazmín Caratini as Carmen; Joanna Going as Theresa Saunders; Deepti Gupta as Dr. Eileen Shamsi; Ayesha Harris as Dr. Parker Ellis; Robert Heaps as Chad Ashcroft; Jackson Kelly as David Saunders; Ken Kirby as Dr. John Shen; Krystel V. McNeil as Kiara Alfaro; Tedra Millan as Dr. Emery Walsh; Skyler Stone as Buster Pirelli; Bethany Walls as Whitney Rivera; Taj Speights as Jake

Episode chronology
← Previous "6:00 P.M."	Next → "8:00 P.M."

"7:00 P.M." is the thirteenth episode of the American medical drama television series The Pitt. The episode was written by co-executive producer Joe Sachs and series creator R. Scott Gemmill, and directed by co-executive producer Damian Marcano. It was released on Max on March 27, 2025.

The series is set in Pittsburgh, following the staff of the Pittsburgh Trauma Medical Hospital ER (nicknamed "The Pitt") during a 15-hour emergency department shift. The series mainly follows Dr. Michael "Robby" Robinavitch, a senior attending still reeling from some traumas. In the episode, the hospital continues tending to victims from a mass shooting, while authorities are concerned that the shooter could arrive at any moment.

The episode received critical acclaim, with Noah Wyle receiving universal acclaim for his performance, particularly during the closing scene.

== Plot ==
A SWAT team arrives at The Pitt, raising concerns among the staff that the shooter might try to get to the hospital. On the rooftop, Whitaker (Gerran Howell) and Javadi (Shabana Azeez) welcome a helicopter, which provides them with a resupply of blood. Robby (Noah Wyle) and Abbot (Shawn Hatosy) work together to operate on an injured police officer using Abbot's home cricothyrotomy kit, managing to save him.

While caring for a circus clown, Whitaker uses an IO on him while he is conscious, and is reprimanded by Mel (Taylor Dearden), as this should only be done when the patient is unresponsive. Later, one of his other patients, Mr. Grayson, suffers a delayed head bleed. To save Grayson, Mohan (Supriya Ganesh) uses an IO drill to reduce intracranial pressure. Langdon (Patrick Ball) tends to a jewelry-shop owner who tries to reach for a gun in his ankle before falling unconscious. The authorities check on the owner's background, but conclude he is not the shooter. To save another patient, Langdon tries a supraclavicular subclavian, surprising Mohan. After her ankle monitor goes off, McKay (Fiona Dourif) disables it with a drill in order to properly focus. Meanwhile, Kiara (Krystel V. McNeil) and Lupe (Tracy Vilar) are assigned to photograph the dead patients in order to contact their families and inform them about their deaths.

Outside the hospital, Robby finds Jake (Taj Speights), who arrived in a car with his girlfriend Leah. Jake is injured in the leg, while Leah is unconscious after receiving a gunshot to the heart. Robby tends to Leah, while Donnie (Brandon Mendez Homer) tends to Jake. Abbot notes that Leah has lost too much blood and warns that he cannot waste using more units of blood on her, but Robby still continues trying to save her. David (Jackson Kelly) returns to the hospital to see his mother Theresa (Joanna Going) and is astonished to find her in a police cruiser. He tries to flee but is tackled by a police officer and immediately placed under suspicion of being the shooter, though he protests his innocence.

To save a patient named Carmen, Santos performs a REBOA, despite protests. Abbot scolds her for doing it herself, but praises her for saving Carmen's life. After failing to come up with alternatives, Robby reluctantly pronounces Leah dead at 7:47. Robby then privately talks with Jake to explain her death, devastating him. Robby hesitantly allows Jake to view Leah's corpse, with Jake blaming Robby for not doing enough and questioning how he was unable to save her. Remembering the death of Dr. Adamson, Robby experiences a breakdown as he reminisces over the patients he has lost that day. He escorts Jake out of the room, then cries alone.

== Production ==
=== Development ===
The episode was written by co-executive producer Joe Sachs and series creator R. Scott Gemmill, and directed by co-executive producer Damian Marcano. It marked Sachs' fourth writing credit, Gemmill's fifth writing credit, and Marcano's fourth directing credit.

=== Writing ===
Noah Wyle explained Robby's breakdown at the climax, "to whatever degree Jake holds Robby responsible, Robby holds himself 10 times more responsible, even if there is nothing he could have done." He considered that the scene was meant to show "the deconstruction of a hero. [The Pitt] was always intended to show that the fragility of our healthcare system is directly proportional to the fragility of the mental health of our practitioners." He also explained the process of filming the scene, "That was the day I finally got to unload what the character had been carrying the whole time. So in a very kind of masochistic way that actors look at things like this, I looked forward to that day with great relish and really enjoyed it." R. Scott Gemmill explained the decision to kill Leah, "Think of these people who go to work or go to a festival or go to a synagogue and don't come home. And then the loved ones are the ones who ultimately suffer the most, because they're the ones who have to deal with the grief. So that was part of it."

== Critical reception ==
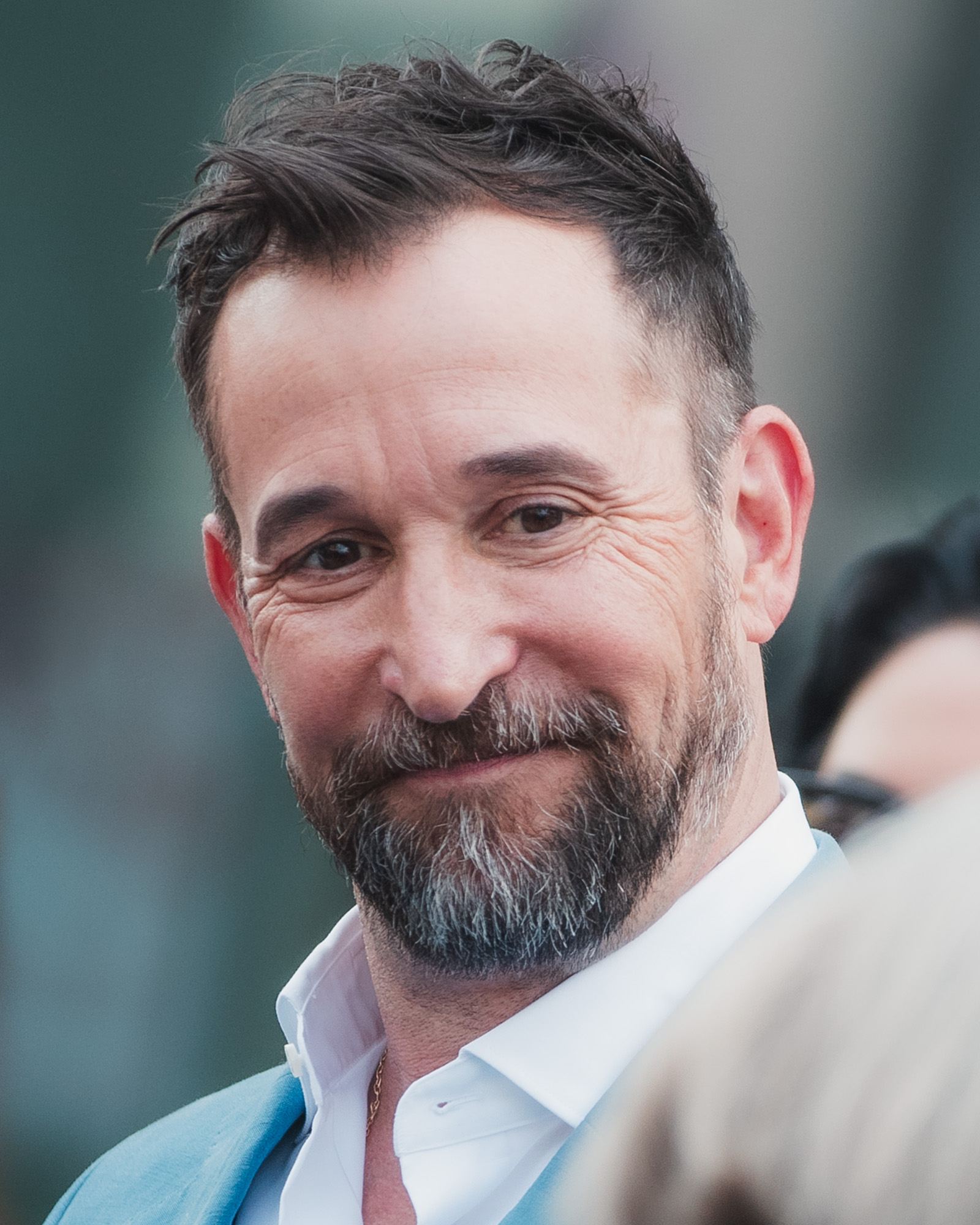
Noah Wyle received high praise for his performance in the episode.

"7:00 P.M." received critical acclaim. Laura Bogart of The A.V. Club gave the episode an "A" grade and wrote, "While The Pitt has been an actor's showcase for its talented cast, it is fundamentally Wyle's show, and this episode gives him his most powerful scene to date. Watching his careworn face crumple soundlessly, telling Jake that Leah has died before he even opens his mouth, is devastating. Wyle seems aware of the potency of his warm, gravely voice, how his tone can sound both knowledgeable and assuring. So as he allows it to rise and start to crack, slowly, as he recounts all the deaths of the day to Jake, the effect is unsettling."

Alan Sepinwall wrote, "I'm bracing myself for the idea that Noah Wyle will be the only actor nominated from the cast. But if that's the case, my lord does he have a great submission episode with this one. Robby's panic attack in the impromptu morgue — as well as his realization that a grief-stricken Jake needs to get out of the room before he witnesses too much of it and gets even more upset — was absolutely gutting. It was also very much earned from the way we've seen him struggling all shift, and how he can't let go of Dr. Adamson's death — including Robby's decision to take him off the ECMO machine to give it to a little girl with a better chance of survival — in this very room."

Maggie Fremont of Vulture gave the episode a perfect 5-star rating out of 5 and wrote, "Watching our doctors work through this harrowing situation was hard enough when it was simply about them trying their best to save anonymous patients, but in this hour, a familiar face enters the ER and ups the emotional stakes of this whole thing. Noah Wyle has several options when it comes to which episode he's going to submit for his inevitable Emmy nomination but, like, maybe it should be this one?" Brady Langmann of Esquire wrote, "It's in Noah Wyle's transcendent monologue — and the image of Dr. Robby crumpled to the floor in a pediatrics room, surrounded by dead bodies — that The Pitt once again captures the pain, weight, and crushing responsibility of a health-care provider. This is the most important show on television right now."

Nick Bythrow of Screen Rant wrote, "Noah Wyle puts on a powerful performance as Robby's face reddens with sadness and anger, listing off everyone who's died that day before wheeling Jake out and having a panic attack, curling up on the floor." Jasmine Blu of TV Fanatic gave the episode a 4.6-star rating out of 5 and wrote, "At some point, you can't take but so much before you fall apart, even the best of us, like Robby. It's oddly cathartic knowing that even when it's heartbreaking as hell, it's cathartic."

Johnny Loftus of Decider wrote, "As it races to its conclusion, a few episodes/hours from now, watching The Pitt remains as taut an experience as working there." Gabriela Burgos Soler of Tell-Tale TV wrote, "This was an event that was due to arrive at any moment, and now that it has, it serves as a reminder of the humanity of the characters. You can't help but think about all the healthcare providers who face something like this constantly."

=== Accolades ===
TVLine named Wyle as the "Performer of the Week" for the week of March 29, 2025, for his performance in the episode. The website wrote: "The pain of the previous 13 hours caught up with Robby, and it was just too much to bear. He hurried Jake out of the morgue, then curled up into a ball. He held his head in his hands, unable to control his tears as his face and neck turned bright red. His portrayer warned us that it was all leading up to this moment, but we never could have predicted the extent to which Robby would unravel. Wyle, in turn, was incredible."

Award	Year	Category	Recipient(s)	Result	Ref.
Astra TV Awards	2025	Best Writing in a Drama Series	Joe Sachs and R. Scott Gemmill	Won	
Black Reel TV Awards	2025	Outstanding Directing in a Drama Series	Damian Marcano	Nominated	
Cinema Audio Society Awards	2026	Outstanding Achievement in Sound Mixing for a Television Series – One Hour	Von Varga, Todd M. Grace, Edward C. Carr III, Tami Treadwell, and Alex Jongbloed	Won	
Creative Arts Emmy Awards	2025	Outstanding Contemporary Makeup (Non-Prosthetic)	Merry Lee Traum, Marie-Flore 'Ri' Beaubien, and Leesa Simone	Nominated	
Creative Arts Emmy Awards	2025	Outstanding Sound Editing for a Comedy or Drama Series (One Hour)	Bryan Parker, Kristen Hirlinger, Vince Tennant, Josh Adeniji, Roland Thai, Sam Lewis, Lyndsey Schenk, Nicholas Kmet, Adam DeCoster, and Alex Ullrich	Nominated	
Golden Reel Awards	2026	Outstanding Achievement in Sound Editing – Broadcast Long Form Dialogue / ADR	Bryan Parker, Kristen Hirlinger, and Vince Tennant	Nominated	
