= 6:00 P.M. (The Pitt season 1) =

- The Pitt episode
- Episode no.: Season 1 Episode 12
- Directed by: Amanda Marsalis
- Written by: Joe Sachs; R. Scott Gemmill
- Cinematography by: Johanna Coelho
- Editing by: Mark Strand
- Production code: T76.10112
- Original air date: March 20, 2025
- Running time: 40 minutes

Guest appearances
- Shawn Hatosy as Dr. Jack Abbott (special guest star); Amielynn Abellera as Perlah Alawi; Jalen Thomas Brooks as Mateo Diaz; Brandon Mendez Homer as Donnie Donahue; Kristin Villanueva as Princess; Joanna Going as Theresa Saunders; Deepti Gupta as Dr. Eileen Shamsi; Ayesha Harris as Dr. Parker Ellis; Becki Hayes as Sylvia; Robert Heaps as Chad Ashcroft; Michael Hyatt as Gloria Underwood; Ken Kirby as Dr. John Shen; Krystel V. McNeil as Kiara Alfaro; Alexandra Metz as Dr. Yolanda Garcia; Tedra Millan as Dr. Emery Walsh; Evan Allen-Gessessee as Dave Miller; Ned Brower as Jesse Van Horne; Henry Samiri as Harrison Ashcroft; Tracy Vilar as Lupe Perez; Richard Wharton as Mr. Grayson

Episode chronology
← Previous "5:00 P.M."	Next → "7:00 P.M."

"6:00 P.M." is the twelfth episode of the American medical drama television series The Pitt. The episode was written by co-executive producer Joe Sachs and series creator R. Scott Gemmill, and directed by Amanda Marsalis. It was released on Max on March 20, 2025.

The series is set in Pittsburgh, following the staff of the Pittsburgh Trauma Medical Hospital ER (nicknamed "The Pitt") during a 15-hour emergency department shift. The series mainly follows Dr. Michael "Robby" Robinavitch, a senior attending still reeling from some traumas. In the episode, the team must deal with dozens of patients flooding the ER following a mass shooting.

The episode received critical acclaim, with reviewers praising the pacing, tension, writing, and performances, with Marsalis nominated for Outstanding Directing for a Drama Series at 77th Primetime Emmy Awards for directing this episode.

== Plot ==
Robby (Noah Wyle) fails to reach Jake and meets with Dana (Katherine LaNasa) and Gloria (Michael Hyatt), who confirms the hospital is locked down after the mass shooting at Pitt Fest. Though Robby fears being overwhelmed, Gloria explains that the night shift has been called in early, doctors from other departments are being pulled to the ER, and all twenty-five operating rooms are being prepared. Robby orders the ER cleared for incoming victims, with Dana coordinating as primary nurse. McKay (Fiona Dourif) asks if police have located David Saunders, but Robby ignores her. Abbott (Shawn Hatosy) arrives to assist coordination, while Whitaker (Gerran Howell), Santos (Isa Briones), and Javadi (Shabana Azeez) collect supplies. Additional staff arrive, including surgeons Garcia (Alexandra Metz) and Shamsi (Deepti Gupta), and night shift doctors Ellis (Ayesha Harris), Walsh (Tedra Millan) and Shen (Ken Kirby). McKay reassures her son Harrison, and Mel (Taylor Dearden) alerts her sister she will be late.

Robby briefs the team on triage, assigning colored slap bands: red for critical, pink for those likely to die within an hour without treatment, yellow for extremity injuries, green for minor wounds, and black/white for deceased. Abbott adds that care will be documented on wrist charts or written on patients due to unavailable electronic systems.

Robby and Shen establish outdoor triage using the AVPU scale for rapid assessment. Theresa (Joanna Going) presents paperwork for an involuntary psychiatric hold for David, insisting he is not responsible. Robby signs and urges her to leave but later asks police to speak with her as victims arrive.

Sylvia (Becki Hayes) arrives with her deaf son Omar, shot in the chest. Omar receives a red band and is stabilized by Mohan (Supriya Ganesh) before surgery. Sylvia, given a yellow band after being struck by a car, is diagnosed by King with a Crus fracture. Robby confronts Langdon (Patrick Ball) for returning after being fired, but allows him to stay.

As casualties flood in, Mel, Whitaker, and Santos treat Mr. Grayson (Richard Wharton), while Javadi treats a trampled woman with a blunt head injury despite her mother Shamsi’s patronizing interference. Dana reports she still cannot reach Jake.

Sylvia collapses from a concealed liver laceration, but Langdon enforces blood rationing. Chad (Robert Heaps) sneaks into the ER after his surgery is canceled and is sent away by McKay. As supplies run out, Santos exposes an undercover reporter, Javadi improvises a chest tube using a tracheal tube, and Mel donates her own blood to save Sylvia. Dana calls for staff with O negative or O positive blood to donate.

Kiara (Krystel V. McNeil) and Lupe (Tracy Vilar) coordinate family identification via QR code. Police inform Robby the FBI is involved and a SWAT team is on standby. As the influx continues, Robby admits they may not be halfway through and sends another undelivered text to Jake.

== Production ==
=== Development ===
The episode was written by co-executive producer Joe Sachs and series creator R. Scott Gemmill, and directed by Amanda Marsalis. It marked Sachs' third writing credit, Gemmill's fourth writing credit, and Marsalis' fourth directing credit.

=== Writing ===
Gemmill explained that, when the network informed him that they wanted fifteen episodes, not the twelve that would've covered a typical ER shift, he began developing a storyline that would keep the characters at the hospital for additional three hours. He and Joe Sachs, series co-executive producer and real-life emergency physician, chose to feature the aftermath of a mass shooting, with Sachs explaining that "with mass shootings, they're in the newspaper every week. Everybody's numb to it. We thought, Let's see the tragedy of what really happens—the families that have to deal with grief and loss, and the tragedy of the psychological and moral trauma to the emergency physicians." Noah Wyle also felt that the plot connected to one of the key themes of the series: exploring the mental health of medical staff. While writing the episode, Sachs spoke to physicians who were present at a range of real-life mass casualty events, including the Columbine High School massacre, the 2012 Aurora theater shooting, and the Route 91 Harvest music festival shooting and worked with Gemmill to create a script that was as realistic as possible. Of this research, Sachs explained "I was so surprised by the absolute absence of technology in the assessment and management of the patients—no X-rays, no CAT scans, no lab tests. Just do what you have to do." The idea to use different colored slap bands to indicate the severity of a patient's condition was devised by Sachs, with Wyle adding "I think what [Joe] has come up with is pretty revolutionary and brilliant, and if that ends up ever being implemented and saving lives, the show has a resonance well beyond just being entertaining."

Regarding Robby's mental state in the episode, Wyle stated "he seems smart, he seems capable, he seems fatherly, he seems competent, he seems compassionate—and then you see him fall down. This is a look at the toll that it takes on the people who take care of us.... Patients are getting sicker, patients are getting angrier, but [these doctors] are making less money—it doesn't compute." Wyle explained that the entire cast and crew knew the significance of getting the episode right, noting "You've got all these characters that are immersed in their own personal dramas and their own storylines, and then when something like this happens, much like in life, that all stops out of necessity. It felt intimidatingly important to execute well, in order to land the plane where we wanted to gracefully."

=== Filming ===
Because of the nature of mass casualty events, in which emergency rooms are cleared to make room for incoming victims, Sachs expressed that episode twelve felt like essentially rebooting the series, referencing how the many background actors and patients from the preceding episodes were removed, and parts of the set were collapsed. Production designer Nina Ruscio built a mini model of the set that took up a whole conference table, filled with small beds and gurneys demarcated by scene number, with Sachs explaining that "we had 50 patients in these big, open spaces, meaning that anytime you’re working on one patient, you might see 12 other patients all being worked on at once—that background all had to look real." Director Amanda Marsalis added that "we took pictures for every single scene, where every single patient was going to be and where they were going to move to and who was going to be next to them." The show's make-up designer Myriam Arougheti also created a look book with breakdowns of all 109 patients who enter the hospital in episodes 12 and 13 which detailed every aspect of their needs for makeup, costume, and props, something Gemmill described as "crucial".

The episode was filmed mostly in chronological order, with Shawn Hatosy noting that this helped the actors feel immersed in the environment. He explained "Gurneys are coming in, the blood is real, the people are real—you're touching them, you're feeling it, you're experiencing this stuff with your hands. There's really no acting involved. You are riding the train, and you're going where it goes, and you can feel it. It gives you just such a rush."

== Critical reception ==
"6:00 P.M." received critical acclaim. Laura Bogart of The A.V. Club gave the episode an "A" grade and wrote, "The episode maintains a high, frenzied pitch of activity with the doctors attending to the wounded, while still fulfilling the character development that has been painstakingly established earlier on." She also praised the directing, the tension and pacing, how the episode links into the show's broader themes, and the performances of Noah Wyle and Patrick Ball. Writing for Vulture, Maggie Fremont gave the episode five out of five stars, stating "Just when you think the medical drama can’t possibly have any additional tricks to show off or there’s no way it could one-up the previous hour, it goes and delivers an episode like this", and praising the writing and directing.

== Accolades ==
Award	Year	Category	Recipient(s)	Result	Ref.
ACE Eddie Awards	2026	Best Edited Drama Series	Mark Strand	Won	
Creative Arts Emmy Awards	2025	Outstanding Sound Mixing for a Comedy or Drama Series (One Hour)	Todd M. Grace, Ed C. Carr III, Von Varga, and Tami Treadwell	Nominated	
Directors Guild of America Awards	2026	Outstanding Directorial Achievement in Drama Series	Amanda Marsalis	Won	
Primetime Emmy Awards	2025	Outstanding Directing for a Drama Series	Amanda Marsalis	Nominated	
