= Joe Sachs =

American television writer and producer

- Education: Stanford University (MD)
- Occupation: Writer; Producer

Joe Mister Sachs is an American television writer and producer as well as an emergency medicine physician. He has worked extensively on the medical drama ER (1994-2009) in both capacities, and is currently a writer and co-executive producer on the HBO Max medical drama The Pitt (2025-present).

== Medical career ==
Joe Sachs studied medicine at Stanford University School of Medicine. After completing a combined residency in emergency medicine and internal medicine at UCLA, he began a part-time emergency medicine practice at Northridge Hospital Medical Center, Los Angeles, where he has worked for more than 30 years.

== Career ==
Sachs first became involved with ER as a technical advisor midway through the first season. He had a guest starring role as an EMT in the first-season episode "Motherhood".

Sachs became a writer beginning in the second season. He continued in his role as a technical advisor and writer until the fifth season, when he assumed the additional responsibility of story editor. He became executive story editor and continued to write episodes for the sixth season, finally giving up his technical advisor role. He then joined the production team and became a supervising producer by the eleventh season. He was promoted to co-executive producer for the thirteenth season and finally became an executive producer for the fourteenth season. As of the close of the fourteenth season he has written 29 episodes.

In 1999 Sachs was nominated for a Writers Guild of America Award for his work on the episode "Exodus" along with his co-writer Walon Green. In 2001 ER was nominated for an Emmy Award for it and Sachs shared the nomination with the other producers.

As of 2025, Sachs is a co-executive producer on the Max medical drama series The Pitt, which is executive produced by his ER collaborators R. Scott Gemmill, John Wells and Noah Wyle, who stars. Sachs wrote the first season's third and eighth episodes on his own, and co-wrote the critically acclaimed "6:00 P.M." and "7:00 P.M." alongside Gemmill, which dealt with the aftermath of a mass shooting. For those episodes, Sachs did extensive research and spoke to physicians who had attended real-life mass casualty events. Sachs wrote three episodes of the second season.

== Filmography ==
=== Writer ===
Year	Show	Episode	Notes
1996	ER	"A Shift in the Night"	Season 2, episode 18
1997	ER	"Make a Wish"	Story - Season 3, episode 21
1998	ER	"Exodus"	Season 4, episode 15
1998	ER	"Masquerade"	Story - Season 5, episode 5
1999	ER	"Sticks and Stones"	Season 5, episode 17
2000	ER	"The Domino Heart"	Season 6, episode 11
2000	ER	"Under Control"	Season 6, episode 16
2000	ER	"Flight of Fancy"	Season 7, episode 5
2001	ER	"Surrender"	Story - Season 7, episode 12
2001	ER	"Thy Will Be Done"	Story - Season 7, episode 13
2001	ER	"Survival of the Fittest"	Season 7, episode 17
2001	ER	"Rampage"	Story - Season 7, episode 22
2001	ER	"Start All Over Again"	Season 8, episode 5
2001	ER	"Quo Vadis?"	Season 8, episode 9
2002	ER	"Lockdown"	Season 8, episode 22
2002	ER	"A Hopeless Wound"	Season 9, episode 5
2003	ER	"The Advocate"	Season 9, episode 17
2003	ER	"Freefall"	Season 10, episode 8
2004	ER	"One for the Road"	Season 11, episode 1
2004	ER	"Shot in the Dark"	Season 11, episode 8
2005	ER	"Refusal of Care"	Season 11, episode 18
2005	ER	"Canon City"	Season 12, episode 1
2005	ER	"Two Ships"	Season 12, episode 8
2006	ER	"Body & Soul"	Season 12, episode 13
2006	ER	"Bloodline"	Season 13, episode 1
2006	ER	"Ames v. Kovac"	Season 13, episode 5
2007	ER	"Family Business"	Season 13, episode 19
2007	ER	"The War Comes Home"	Season 14, episode 1
2007	ER	"Under the Influence"	Season 14, episode 5
2007	ER	"300 Patients"	Season 14, episode 10
2008	ER	"Owner of a Broken Heart"	Season 14, episode 14
2008	ER	"Life After Death"	Season 15, episode 1
2008	ER	"Let It Snow"	Season 15, episode 9
2009	ER	"A Long, Strange Trip"	Season 15, episode 14
2009	ER	"I Feel Good"	Season 15, episode 21
2010	Mercy	"Too Much Attitude and Not Enough Underware"	Season 1, episode 21
2011	Off the Map	"It's Good"	Season 1, episode 6
2011	Off the Map	"I'm Home"	Season 1, episode 10
2011	NCIS: Los Angeles	"Higher Power"	Season 3, episode 11
2012	NCIS: Los Angeles	"The Dragon and the Fairy"	Season 3, episode 18
2013	NCIS: Los Angeles	"Drive"	Season 4, episode 11
2013	NCIS: Los Angeles	"Purity"	Season 4, episode 20
2013	NCIS: Los Angeles	"The Livelong Day"	Season 5, episode 7
2014	NCIS: Los Angeles	"Fish Out of Water"	Season 5, episode 16
2015	NCIS: Los Angeles	"Black Wind"	Season 6, episode 14
2015	NCIS: Los Angeles	"Blaze of Glory"	Season 6, episode 19
2016	NCIS: Los Angeles	"Core Values"	Season 7, episode 12
2016	NCIS: Los Angeles	"Seoul Man"	Season 7, episode 20
2016	NCIS: Los Angeles	"Parallel Resistors"	Season 8, episode 8
2017	NCIS: Los Angeles	"From Havana with Love"	Season 8, episode 20
2018	NCIS: Los Angeles	"Under Pressure"	Season 9, episode 12
2018	NCIS: Los Angeles	"Nigunda Saluda"	Season 9, episode 24
2019	NCIS: Los Angeles	"The Sound of Silence"	Season 10, episode 12
2019	NCIS: Los Angeles	"Choke Point"	Season 10, episode 20
2019	NCIS: Los Angeles	"Human Resources"	Season 11, episode 8
2025	The Pitt	"9:00 A.M."	Season 1, episode 3
2025	The Pitt	"2:00 P.M."	Season 1, episode 8
2025	The Pitt	"6:00 P.M."	Season 1, episode 12
2025	The Pitt	"7:00 P.M."	Season 1, episode 13
2026	The Pitt	"8:00 A.M."	Season 2, episode 2
2026	The Pitt	"2:00 P.M."	Season 2, episode 8
2026	The Pitt	"7:00 P.M."	Season 2, episode 13
