= Ernest Harden Jr. =

American film and television actor

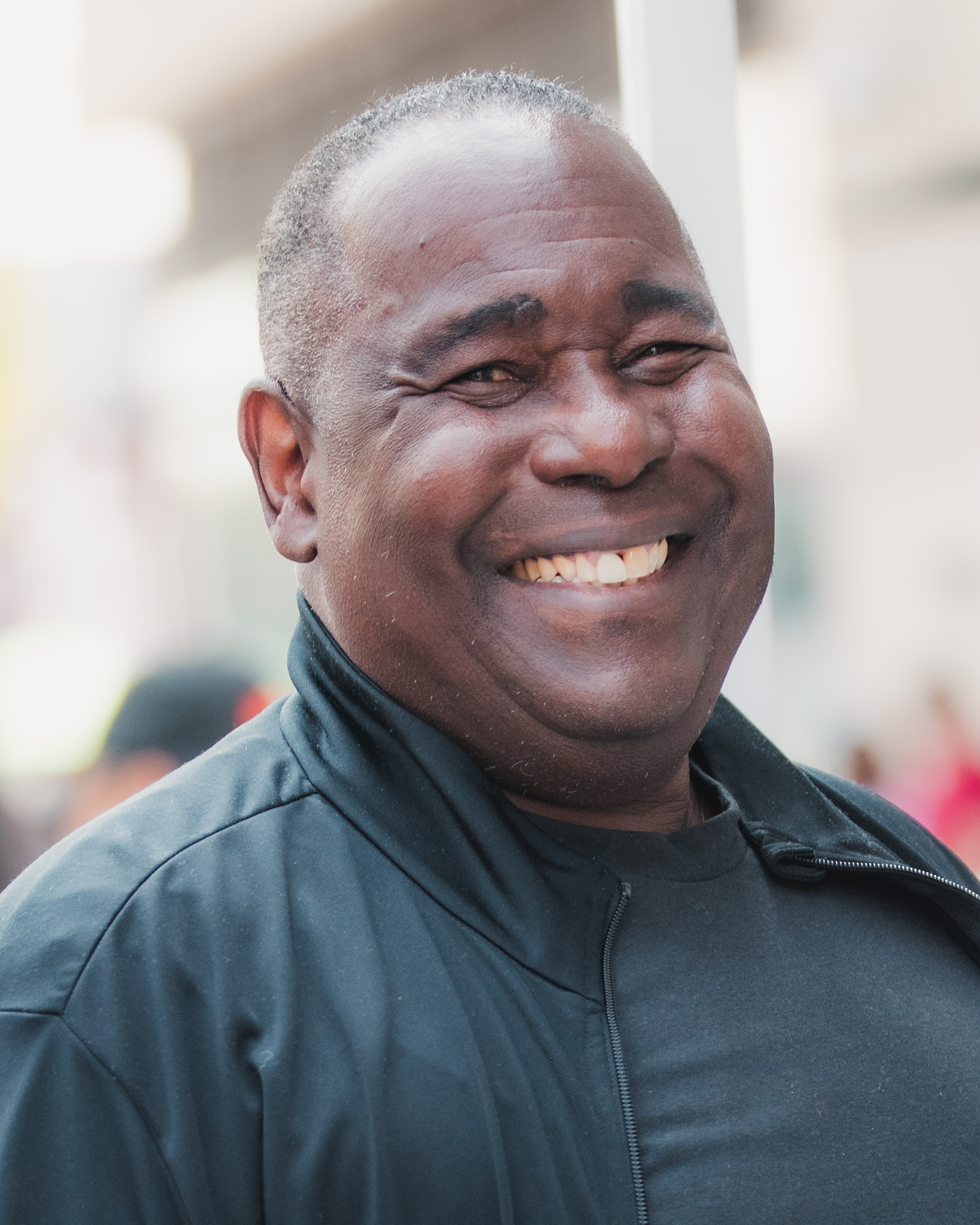
- Harden in 2026
- Born: November 25, 1952 (age 73); Detroit, Michigan, U.S.
- Occupations: Film and television actor
- Years active: 1975–present

Ernest Harden Jr. (born November 25, 1952) is an American film and television actor. He is best known for playing the recurring role of Marcus Henderson in the American sitcom television series The Jeffersons. For his performance as Louie Cloverfield in the HBO Max medical drama television series The Pitt, he won a Primetime Emmy Award in the category Outstanding Guest Actor in a Drama Series.

In addition to his Primetime Emmy Award win, he guest-starred in numerous television programs including Hill Street Blues, Good Times, The Bernie Mac Show, ER, The Young and the Restless, The Parkers, The Robert Guillaume Show and Santa Barbara. He also appeared in numerous films such as White Mama, Sweetwater, Three Days of the Condor, Hollywood Homicide, Born in East L.A. and The Final Terror.
