= Alexandra Metz =

American actress (born 1986)

- Born: May 23, 1986 (age 40); New York City, US
- Occupation: Actress
- Years active: 2010–present

Alexandra Metz (born May 23, 1986) is an American actress. She is best known for playing Dr. Yolanda Garcia in the medical drama series The Pitt and Elise Mills in the drama series Chicago Fire.

== Early and personal life ==
Metz was born on May 23, 1986 in New York City to a Jewish father and Afro-Latina mother from Panamá. She graduated from Brown University in 2008 with a degree in human biology. She has been married to writer and director Zachariah Pierce Groll since 2021.

== Career ==
Metz's first recurring role was Katie in the supernatural drama series The Originals. She played Rapunzel in an episode of the drama series Once Upon a Time. Her first big role was playing detective Elise Mills in the drama series Chicago Fire.

Metz had a recurring role as Maya Gowen on the sci-fi drama series Frequency. Her biggest role so far has been playing Dr. Yolanda Garcia in the medical drama series The Pitt.

In September 2026, it was announced that Metz would be joining the ABC series Will Trent in the show's fifth season as part of the main cast.

== Filmography ==
=== Film ===
Year	Title	Role	Notes
2011	Trouble In The Heights	Ana	
2011	American Standard	Cristina Alvarez	Short
2012	Nous York	Assia	
2012	Backwards	Hannah	
2013	The Last Keepers	Cally	
2014	Affluenza	Lisa	
2017	Controversy	Ashley	
2018	Brimming with Love	Mia	
2022	Introducing Billy Bradley	Anna Bradley	Short
2022	The Mask in Our Hands	Aria	Short
TBA	Iron Jane †		Post-production

=== Television ===
Year	Title	Role	Notes
2010	Law & Order: Criminal Intent	Riley	Episode Delicate
2010	Law & Order: Special Victims Unit	Tori	Episode; Bullseye
2010	Blue Bloods	Courtney Thurman	Episode; Privilege
2010	The Good Wife	Ruby Wright	Episode; Nine Hours
2012	Gossip Girl	Amy	Episode; Despicable B
2013	The Originals	Katie	2 episodes
2014	Once Upon a Time	Rapunzel	Episode; The Tower
2014	Bones	Anne Schamberg	Episode; The Geek in the Guck
2012–2015	Chicago Fire	Elise Mills	6 episodes
2015	NCIS: New Orleans	Billy Hart	Episode; Billy and the Kid
2016	How to Get Away with Murder	Melanie Dalton	2 episodes
2016	Single by 30	Sarah	5 episodes
2016	Frequency	Maya Gowan	2 episodes
2018	The Magicians	Ora	Episode; Will You Play with Me?
2021	Magnum P.I.	Lanie	Episode; The Long Way Home
2023	Grey's Anatomy	Carmen Alvarez	Episode; Wedding Bell Blues
2024	Tracker	Tracy Thompson	Episode; Off The Books
2025–2026	The Pitt	Yolanda Garcia	11 episodes

== Awards and nominations ==
Award	Year	Category	Nominated work	Result	Ref.
Actor Awards	2026	Outstanding Performance by an Ensemble in a Drama Series	The Pitt	Won	
