= Attending physician =

Licensed medical doctor practicing at a clinic or hospital

In the United States and Canada, an attending physician (also known as a staff physician or supervising physician) is a physician (usually an M.D., or D.O. in the United States) who has completed residency and practices medicine in a clinic or hospital, in the specialty learned during residency. An attending physician typically supervises fellows, residents, and medical students. Attending physicians may also maintain professorships at an affiliated medical school. This is common if the supervision of trainees is a significant part of the physician's work. Attending physicians have final responsibility, legally and otherwise, for patient care, even when many of the minute-to-minute decisions are being made by house officers (residents) or non-physician health-care providers (i.e. physician assistants and nurse practitioners). Attending physicians are sometimes the 'rendering physician' listed on the patient's official medical record, but if they are overseeing a resident or another staff member, they are 'supervising.'

The term "attending physician" or "attending" also refers to the formal relationship of a hospitalized patient and their primary medic during the hospitalization, as opposed to ancillary physicians assisting the primary care physician. However, even on a consultation service, at an academic center, the physician who has finished their training is called the attending or consultant, as opposed to a resident physician.

Attending physicians may also still be in training, such as a fellow in a subspecialty. For example, a cardiology fellow may function as an internal medicine attending, as they have already finished residency in internal medicine. The term is used more commonly in teaching hospitals. In non-teaching hospitals, essentially all physicians function as attendings in some respects after completing residency.

== See also ==
- Consultant (medicine) (equivalent title in the United Kingdom and Commonwealth)
- Attending physician statement
