= 78th Primetime Creative Arts Emmy Awards =

2026 American television programming awards for creative arts

- Date: September 5–6, 2026
- Presented by: Academy of Television Arts & Sciences
- Most awards: Widow's Bay (8)
- Most nominations: Hacks (17)

The 78th Primetime Creative Arts Emmy Awards honored the best in artistic and technical achievement in American prime time television programming from June 1, 2025, until May 31, 2026, as chosen by the Academy of Television Arts & Sciences. The awards were presented on September 5 and 6, 2026, at the Peacock Theater in Downtown Los Angeles, California. A total of 101 Creative Arts Emmy categories were presented. The nominations were announced on July 8, 2026. Hacks received the most nominations with 17, followed by Beef and the medical drama The Pitt with 13 each.

== Winners and nominees ==
Winners will be listed first, highlighted in boldface, and indicated with a double dagger (‡). (Note: The outlets listed for each program are the U.S. broadcasters or streaming services identified in the nominations, which for some international productions are different than the broadcaster(s) that originally commissioned the program. Programs broadcast by HBO or HBO Max were listed under both services in the nominations list; only the original broadcaster is listed below.) Sections are based upon the categories listed in the 2025–2026 Emmy rules and procedures. Area awards and juried awards are denoted next to the category names as applicable. (Note: Area awards are non-competitive; any nominee with at least 90% approval receives an Emmy. If no nominee receives 90% approval, the nominee with the highest approval receives an Emmy; for area awards in picture editing and sound mixing, there is an additional requirement that the highest-rated nominee must have at least 50% approval.; Juried awards generally do not have nominations; instead, all entrants are screened before members of the appropriate peer group, and one, more than one, or no entry is awarded an Emmy based on the jury's vote.) For simplicity, producers who received nominations for program awards have been omitted.

=== Programs ===
Programs
**Outstanding Movie**: **Remarkably Bright Creatures (Netflix)**; Heads of State (Prime Video); Miss You, Love You (HBO); People We Meet on Vacation (Netflix); Tom Clancy's Jack Ryan: Ghost War (Prime Video)	**Outstanding Variety Special (Live)**: **The Apple Music Super Bowl LX Halftime Show Starring Bad Bunny (NBC)**; 83rd Annual Golden Globes (CBS); 68th Annual Grammy Awards (CBS); The Oscars (ABC); 78th Annual Tony Awards (CBS)
**Outstanding Variety Special (Pre-Recorded)**: **The Muppet Show (Disney+)**; Dave Chappelle: The Unstoppable... (Netflix); Nikki Glaser: Good Girl (Hulu); Taylor Swift: The Eras Tour: The Final Show (Disney+); Wicked: One Wonderful Night (NBC)	**Outstanding Game Show**: **Jeopardy! (ABC / Syndicated)**; Celebrity Family Feud (ABC); The Price Is Right (CBS); Wheel of Fortune (ABC); Who Wants to Be a Millionaire (ABC)
**Outstanding Animated Program**: **South Park: "Sermon on the 'Mount" (Comedy Central)**; Bob's Burgers: "Grand Pre-Pre-Pre-Opening" (Fox); Rick and Morty: "There's Something About Morty" (Adult Swim); The Simpsons: "Homer? A Cracker Bro?" (Fox); Smiling Friends: "Le Voyage Incroyable de Monsieur Grenouille" (Adult Swim); Star Wars: Visions: "BLACK" (Disney+)	**Outstanding Structured Reality Program**: **Antiques Roadshow (PBS)**; Diners, Drive-Ins and Dives (Food Network); Love Is Blind (Netflix); Queer Eye (Netflix); Shark Tank (ABC)
**Outstanding Unstructured Reality Program**: **Love on the Spectrum (Netflix)**; America's Sweethearts: Dallas Cowboys Cheerleaders (Netflix); RuPaul's Drag Race: Untucked (MTV); Summer House (Bravo); Welcome to Wrexham (FX)	**Outstanding Documentary or Nonfiction Series**: **Mr. Scorsese (Apple TV)**; The American Revolution (PBS); Rafa (Netflix); Sean Combs: The Reckoning (Netflix); The Yogurt Shop Murders (HBO)
**Outstanding Documentary or Nonfiction Special**: **My Mom Jayne: A Film by Mariska Hargitay (HBO)**; John Candy: I Like Me (Prime Video); Marty, Life Is Short (Netflix); Mel Brooks: The 99 Year Old Man! (HBO Max); Ocean with David Attenborough (Nat Geo)	**Outstanding Hosted Nonfiction Series or Special**: **Tucci in Italy (Nat Geo)**; The Daily Show Presents: Jordan Klepper Fingers the Pulse: Give the Man a Prize (Comedy Central); Finding Your Roots with Henry Louis Gates, Jr. (PBS); My Next Guest Needs No Introduction with David Letterman (Netflix); The Reluctant Traveler with Eugene Levy (Apple TV)
**Exceptional Merit in Documentary Filmmaking (Juried)**: **The Librarians (PBS)**; The Tale of Silyan (Nat Geo)	**Outstanding Short Form Comedy, Drama or Variety Series**: **Colbert Before Air (YouTube)**; Bad Thoughts (Netflix); The Daily Show: Desi Lydic Foxsplains (YouTube); The Randy Rainbow Show (YouTube); SubwayTakes with Kareem Rahma (YouTube)
**Outstanding Short Form Nonfiction or Reality Series**: **Inside the Pitt (HBO Max)**; Hacks: Bit by Bit (HBO Max); Love Story: John F. Kennedy Jr. & Carolyn Bessette – A Love Untold (FX); Shrinking – In It Together (Apple TV); This Is a Gardening Show (Netflix)	**Outstanding Emerging Media Program**: **Uncanny Alley: A New Day (VRChat)**; Blumhouse Enhanced Cinema (Meta Quest); The World of Fallout (Prime Video)
**Outstanding Innovation in Emerging Media Programming (Juried)**: **Crafting Crimes (Meta Quest)**‡

=== Performing ===
Performing
**Outstanding Supporting Actor in a Limited or Anthology Series or Movie**: **David Harbour – DTF St. Louis as Floyd Smernitch (HBO)**; Jason Bateman – DTF St. Louis as Clark Forrest (HBO); Richard Gadd – Half Man as Ruben Pallister (HBO); Richard Jenkins – DTF St. Louis as Detective Donoghue Homer (HBO); Charles Melton – Beef as Austin Davis (Netflix); Nick Offerman – Death by Lightning as Chester A. Arthur (Netflix)	**Outstanding Supporting Actress in a Limited or Anthology Series or Movie**: **Linda Cardellini – DTF St. Louis as Carol Love-Smernitch (HBO)**; Dakota Fanning – All Her Fault as Jenny Kaminski (Peacock); Laurie Metcalf – Monster: The Ed Gein Story as Augusta Gein (Netflix); Joy Sunday – DTF St. Louis as Jodie Plumb (HBO); Youn Yuh-jung – Beef as Chairwoman Park (Netflix); Constance Zimmer – Love Story: John F. Kennedy Jr. & Carolyn Bessette as Ann Messina Freeman (FX)
**Outstanding Guest Actor in a Comedy Series**: **Rob Reiner – The Bear: "Tonnato" as Albert Schnur (FX) (Posthumous award)**; Michael J. Fox – Shrinking: "The Field" as Gerry (Apple TV); Brett Goldstein – Shrinking: "Happiness Mission" as Louis Winston (Apple TV); Hamish Linklater – Widow's Bay: "Seasickness" as Richard Warren (Apple TV); Christopher McDonald – Hacks: "No New Tricks" as Marty Ghilain (HBO Max); Connor Storrie – Saturday Night Live: "Host: Connor Storrie" as host (NBC)	**Outstanding Guest Actress in a Comedy Series**: **Betty Gilpin – Widow's Bay: "Our History" as Sarah Westcott Warren (Apple TV)**; Leslie Bibb – Hacks: "Montecito" as Monica (HBO Max); Jamie Lee Curtis – The Bear: "Tonnato" as Donna Berzatto (FX); Cherry Jones – Hacks: "Montecito" as Kelly Kilpatrick (HBO Max); Laurie Metcalf – Hacks: "The Garden" as "Weed" / Alice (HBO Max); Kaitlin Olson – Hacks: "D'Amazing Race" as Deborah "DJ" Vance Jr. (HBO Max); Lauren Weedman – Hacks: "The Cube" as Jo Pezzimenti (HBO Max)
**Outstanding Guest Actor in a Drama Series**: **Ernest Harden Jr. – The Pitt: "7:00 A.M." as Louie Cloverfield (HBO Max)**; Colman Domingo – Euphoria: "In God We Trust" as Ali Muhammad (HBO); Jeff Hiller – Pluribus: "Please, Carol" as Larry (Apple TV); Jeff Kober – The Pitt: "8:00 P.M." as Duke Ekins (HBO Max); Jonathan Pryce – Slow Horses: "Scars" as David Cartwright (Apple TV); Bradley Whitford – The Diplomat: "Amagansett" as Todd Penn (Netflix)	**Outstanding Guest Actress in a Drama Series**: **Shailene Woodley – Paradise: "Graceland" as Annie Clay (Hulu)**; Brittany Allen – The Pitt: "3:00 P.M." as Roxie Hamler (HBO Max); Tal Anderson – The Pitt: "5:00 P.M." as Becca King (HBO Max); Tina Ivlev – The Pitt: "1:00 P.M." as Ilana Miller (HBO Max); Miriam Shor – Pluribus: "We Is Us" as Helen (Apple TV); Merritt Wever – The Gilded Age: "Marriage Is a Gamble" as Monica O'Brien (HBO)
**Outstanding Performer in a Short Form Comedy or Drama Series**: **Desi Lydic – The Daily Show: Desi Lydic Foxsplains as herself (YouTube)**; Kim Estes – Big Law as Boyd Bennett (Vimeo); Randy Rainbow – The Randy Rainbow Show as himself (YouTube)	**Outstanding Character Voice-Over Performance**: **Julie Andrews – Bridgerton: "The Waltz" as Lady Whistledown (Netflix)**; Pamela Adlon – King of the Hill: "Any Given Hill-Day" as Bobby Hill (Hulu); Hank Azaria – The Simpsons: "Keep Chalm and Gary On" as Gary Chalmers (Fox); Trey Parker – South Park: "The Crap Out" as Satan (Comedy Central); Matt Vogel – The Muppet Show as Kermit the Frog (Disney+); Steven Yeun – Invincible: "Don't Leave Me Hanging Here" as Mark Grayson / Invincible (Prime Video)
**Outstanding Narrator**: **Octavia Spencer – Lost Women of Alaska: "The Missing" (Investigation Discovery)**; David Attenborough – A Gorilla Story: Told by David Attenborough (Netflix); David Attenborough – Ocean with David Attenborough (Nat Geo); Jodie Foster – Breakdown: 1975 (Netflix); Werner Herzog – Ghost Elephants (Nat Geo)	**Outstanding Host for a Game Show**: **Jimmy Kimmel – Who Wants to Be a Millionaire (ABC)**; Steve Harvey – Celebrity Family Feud (ABC); Ken Jennings – Jeopardy! (ABC / Syndicated); Colin Jost – Pop Culture Jeopardy! (Netflix); Martin Short – Match Game (ABC)
**Outstanding Host for a Reality or Reality Competition Program**: **Alan Cumming – The Traitors (Peacock)**; RuPaul Charles – RuPaul's Drag Race (MTV); Kristen Kish – Top Chef (Bravo); Ariana Madix – Love Island USA (Peacock); Jeff Probst – Survivor (CBS)

=== Animation ===
Animation
**Outstanding Individual Achievement in Animation (Juried)**
- **Eyes of Wakanda: "Into the Lion's Den" – Uzoma Dunkwu (Disney+)**‡
- **Genndy Tartakovsky's Primal: "Kingdom of Sorrow" – David Krentz (Adult Swim)**‡
- **Genndy Tartakovsky's Primal: "Vengeance of Death" – Scott Wills (Adult Swim)**‡
- **The Mighty Nein: "Mote of Possibility" – Howard Chen (Prime Video)**‡
- **Star Wars: Visions: "The Duel: Payback" – Takashi Okazaki (Disney+)**‡

=== Art Direction ===
Art Direction
**Outstanding Production Design for a Narrative Contemporary Program (One Hour or More)**: **Pluribus: "Grenade" – Denise Pizzini, Dins Danielsen, and Ashley Michelle Marsh (Apple TV)**; Euphoria: "This Little Piggy" – François Audouy, A. Todd Holland, and Anthony Carlino (HBO); The Pitt: "9:00 P.M." – Nina Ruscio, Josh Lusby, and Matt Callahan (HBO Max); Slow Horses: "Incommunicado" – Choi Ho Man, Oskars Vilnitis-Pantelejevs, and Kamlan Man (Apple TV); Wednesday: "If These Woes Could Talk" – Mark Scruton, Shane McEnroe, and David Morison (Netflix)	**Outstanding Production Design for a Narrative Period or Fantasy Program (One Hour or More)**: **Fallout: "The Wrangler" – Howard Cummings, David Lazan, and Julie Ochipinti (Prime Video)**; The Gilded Age: "If You Want to Cook an Omelette" – Bob Shaw, Larry W. Brown, and Jennifer Alex Nickason (HBO); Palm Royale: "Maxine Does Something Good" – Jon Carlos, Rachel Aguirre, Amelia Brooke, Mark Robert Taylor, and Ellen Reede (Apple TV); Spider-Noir: "Step into My Office" – Warren Alan Young, Mark Larkin, and Halina Siwolop (MGM+ / Prime Video); Stranger Things: "Chapter Four: Sorcerer" – Chris Trujillo, Sean Brennan, and Jess Royal (Netflix)
**Outstanding Production Design for a Narrative Program (Half-Hour)**: **Widow's Bay: "Lodging" – Steve Arnold, Peter Borck, and Jennifer Engel (Apple TV)**; Hacks: "Who's Making Dinner?" – Rob Tokarz, Jeanine Ringer, and Jennifer Lukehart (HBO Max); A Knight of the Seven Kingdoms: "Seven" – Tom McCullagh, John Merry, and Stephanie Rea (HBO); Leanne: "Please Be a Lizard" – Francoise Cherry-Cohen, Gail L. Russell, and Ann Shea (Netflix); Only Murders in the Building: "The House Always..." – Patrick Howe, Casey Smith, and Mila Khalevich (Hulu)	**Outstanding Production Design for a Variety or Reality Series**: **The Traitors: "The Black Banquet" – Stuart Frossell, Luke Fuller, Georgia Picton, Alex Robertson, Rosie Westwood, and Celina Hodge (Peacock)**; Jimmy Kimmel Live!: "Guests: Stephen Colbert, Seth Meyers, Kumail Nanjiani, Josh Meyers, and Musical Guest Reneé Rapp" – David Ellis, Hillarie Brigode, and Heidi Miller (ABC); The Late Show with Stephen Colbert: "Guests: John Krasinski, and Special Appearances" – Jim Fenhagen, Larry Hartman, Brendan Hurley, and Riley Mellon (CBS); RuPaul's Drag Race: "RDR Live Returns!" – Jen Chu, Tyler Stone, and Melissa Arcaro (MTV); Saturday Night Live: "Host: Jack Black" – Akira Yoshimura, Keith Ian Raywood, N. Joseph DeTullio, Ken MacLeod, Melissa Shakun, and Kimberly Kachougian (NBC)
**Outstanding Production Design for a Variety Special**: **The Muppet Show – Denise Pizzini, Chet Maxwell, Robert Aguirre, and Bethany Barton (Disney+)**; The Apple Music Super Bowl LX Halftime Show Starring Bad Bunny – Bruce Rodgers, Shelley Rodgers, Lily Rodgers, Julio Himede, and Leticia Leon (NBC); 68th Annual Grammy Awards – Julio Himede, Kristen Merlino, Gloria Lamb, Ellen Jaworski, Scott Welborn, and Kaydee Lavorin (CBS); The Oscars – Misty Buckley, Alana Billingsley, John Zuiker, and Jonathan Stoller-Schoff (ABC); 78th Annual Tony Awards – Steve Bass, Star Theodos Kahn, and Aaron Black (CBS)

=== Casting ===
Casting
**Outstanding Casting for a Comedy Series**: **Widow's Bay – Allison Jones, Emily Buntyn, Lisa Lobel, and Angela Peri (Apple TV)**; Abbott Elementary – Wendy O'Brien and Chris Gehrt (ABC); Hacks – Linda Lowy, Morgan Smith, and Lily Trotter (HBO Max); Only Murders in the Building – Bernard Telsey, Tiffany Little Canfield, and Destiny Lilly (Hulu); Shrinking – Brett Benner, Debby Romano, and Daniel Schwab (Apple TV)	**Outstanding Casting for a Drama Series**: **The Pitt – Cathy Sandrich Gelfond, Erica Berger, and Seth Caskey (HBO Max)**; The Diplomat – Julie Schubert, Lain Kunin, Ellinor Isherwood, Lucinda Syson, and Natasha Vincent (Netflix); Paradise – Tiffany Little Canfield, Josh Einsohn, and Brian Sutow (Hulu); Pluribus – Sharon Bialy, Sherry Thomas, Russell Scott, and Marie A.K. McMaster (Apple TV); Slow Horses – Nina Gold and Melissa Gethin Clarke (Apple TV)
**Outstanding Casting for a Limited or Anthology Series or Movie**: **Love Story: John F. Kennedy Jr. & Carolyn Bessette – Courtney Bright, Nicole Daniels, and Jennifer Brooks (FX)**; All Her Fault – David Rubin, Matt Lander, Djinous Rowling, and Jane Norris (Peacock); The Beast in Me – Julie Tucker and Kim Krakauer (Netflix); Beef – Jeanie Bacharach (Netflix); DTF St. Louis – Francine Maisler, Amber Wakefield, Molly Rose, Chase Paris, and Tara Feldstein Bennett (HBO)	**Outstanding Casting for a Reality Program**: **Love on the Spectrum – Cian O'Clery, Sean Bowman, Ashley Morgan, and Emily Frisbie (Netflix)**; The Amazing Race – Jesse Tannenbaum, Kayla Kellerbauer, and Alex Stiner (CBS); RuPaul's Drag Race – Goloka Bolte, Adam Cook, and Michelle Redwine (MTV); Survivor – Jesse Tannenbaum, Penni Lane Clifton, Caitlin Moore, and Heidi Hill (CBS); Top Chef – Ron Mare, Heather Allyn, Joy Barrett, Anna Sturgeon, and Sena Rich (Bravo)

=== Choreography ===
Choreography
**Outstanding Choreography for Variety or Reality Programming (Juried)**: **The Apple Music Super Bowl LX Halftime Show Starring Bad Bunny: "Casita Medley" / "EoO" / "Nuevayol" – Charm La'Donna and Karina Ortiz (NBC)**; 2025 MTV Video Music Awards: "Tate McRae Performance" – Robbie Blue (CBS); The Oscars: "Golden" – Mandy Moore (ABC); RuPaul's Drag Race: "Versatile" / "Stimulate" / "What's in a Ball?" – Jamal Sims (MTV); Wicked: One Wonderful Night: "The Wizard and I" – Christopher Scott (NBC)	**Outstanding Choreography for Scripted Programming (Juried)**: **Palm Royale: "Comin' Home Baby" / "I Want to Be a Cowboy's Sweetheart" / "I Had a Ball" – Brooke Lipton (Apple TV)**; Bridgerton: "Pink" / "Full Circle" / "Recital" / "Masquerade" / "Stag" – Sean "Jack" Murphy (Netflix); Noah's Arc: The Movie: "Love Is a Contact Sport" / "Next Caller" – Christian John-Devi Vincent (Paramount+); Stumble: "Media Day Routine" / "Bring It on Routine" / "Truck Routine" / "Elite Cheer Routine" / "Car Wash Routine" / "SDSJC Daytona Routine" / "Buttons Daytona Routine" – Dahlston Delgado (NBC); Wednesday: "The Dead Dance" – Corey Baker (Netflix); Will Trent: "Nuevayol" – Lance Guillermo and Danielle Sten (ABC)

=== Cinematography ===
Cinematography
**Outstanding Cinematography for a Series (Half-Hour)**: **Widow's Bay: "Our History" – Christian Sprenger (Apple TV)**; The Bear: "Scallop" – Andrew Wehde (FX); Hacks: "The Garden" – Adam Bricker (HBO Max); A Knight of the Seven Kingdoms: "In the Name of the Mother" – Gustav Danielsson (HBO); The Upshaws: "Indy Streets" – Chuck Ozeas (Netflix)	**Outstanding Cinematography for a Series (One Hour)**: **Spider-Noir: "Step into My Office" – Darran Tiernan (MGM+ / Prime Video)**; Alien: Earth: "Neverland" – Dana Gonzales (FX); Euphoria: "In God We Trust" – Marcell Rév (HBO); Margo's Got Money Troubles: "Flamingos" – Tari Segal (Apple TV); Pluribus: "We Is Us" – Marshall Adams (Apple TV); Task: "Crossings" – Alex Disenhof (HBO)
**Outstanding Cinematography for a Limited or Anthology Series or Movie**: **DTF St. Louis: "Cornhole" – James Whitaker (HBO)**; Beef: "It Will Stay This Way and You Will Obey" – James Laxton (Netflix); Black Rabbit: "Isle of Joy" – Peter Konczal (Netflix); Death by Lightning: "Destiny of the Republic" – Adriano Goldman (Netflix); Monster: The Ed Gein Story: "Buxom Bird" – Michael Bauman (Netflix)	**Outstanding Cinematography for a Nonfiction Program**: **Ocean with David Attenborough – Doug Anderson and Toby Strong (Nat Geo)**; My Mom Jayne: A Film by Mariska Hargitay – Tony Hardmon (HBO); The Tale of Silyan – Jean Dakar (Nat Geo); Tucci in Italy: "Le Marche" – Matt Ball (Nat Geo); The Yogurt Shop Murders: "The End of Wondering" – Justin Zweifach and Christoper LaMarca (HBO)
**Outstanding Cinematography for a Reality Program**: **The Traitors – Siggi Rosen-Rawlings, Matt Wright, Will Antill, Jack Booth, Alex Bruno, Ollie Green, Quin Jessop, Guy Linton, Scott McKee, Joshua Montague, Hazel Palmer, Steve Peters, Paul Rudge, James Spencer, Matt Thomson, Alex Took, and Melvin Wright (Peacock)**; The Amazing Race – Joshua Gitersonke, Bryan T. Adams, Kathryn Barrows, Kurt Carpenter, Petr Cikhart, Stephen A. Coleman, David DAngelo, Matthew Di Girolamo, Chris Ellison, Adam Haisinger, Jamie Holland, Kevin R. Johnson, Tim Laks, Regan Letourneau, Daniel Long, Lucas Kenna Mertes, Will Shipp, Alan Weeks, Scott Shelley, Holly Thompson, and Jay Kaufman (CBS); Love on the Spectrum: "Episode 4" – Geoff Thomas and Cian O'Clery (Netflix); Survivor – Scott Duncan, Peter Wery, Russ Fill, Granger Scholtz, Christopher Barker, Cullum Andrews, Tim Barker, Marc Bennett, James Boon, Rory Boon, Paulo Castillo, Rodney Chauvin, Lanza Coffin, Bong Conde, Luke Cormack, Chris Ellison, Ben Gamble, Nixon George, Marcus Hebbelmann, Derek Hoffmann, Matthias Hoffmann, Kenny Hoffmann, Toby Hogan, Derek Holt, Jude Jatau, Dionne Jones, Efrain "Mofi" Laguna, Kyle Mcauley, Ian Miller, Nico Nyoni, Jojo Oducayen, Paul Peddinghaus, Jeff Phillips, Nejc Poberaj, Louis Powell, Jovan Sales, Erick Sarmiento, Dirk Steyn, John Tattersall, Holly Thompson, Nic Van Der Westhuizen, Paulo Velozo, and Dwight Winston (CBS); Welcome to Wrexham: "Do a Wrexham" – Leighton Cox, Ed Edwards, Verdy Oliver, Tom Reece, and Kieren Startup (FX)

=== Commercial ===
Commercial
**Outstanding Commercial**
- **"I'm Not Remarkable" – Apple and Somesuch (Apple)**
  - "Backstory" – TBWA\Chiat\Day LA and Somesuch Los Angeles (Levi's)
  - "Backyard Legends" – Lola USA and Smuggler (adidas World Cup)
  - "A Critter Carol" – TBWA Media Arts Lab and Smuggler (Apple)
  - "Why Do It" – Wieden+Kennedy and Iconoclast (Nike)
  - "Your Way Out" – Isle of Any and MJZ (Coinbase)

=== Costumes ===
Costumes
**Outstanding Period Costumes**: **Palm Royale: "Maxine Is Ready to Single Mingle" – Alix Friedberg, Leigh Bell, Samantha Schwartz, Carolyn Dessert, Jennifer Wolf, and Valerie Keiser (Apple TV)**; Bridgerton: "Dance in the Country" – John Walter Glaser III, Dougie Hawkes, George Sayer, Anthony Brookman, Amanda McLaughlan, and Pascha Hanaway (Netflix); The Gilded Age: "Marriage Is a Gamble" – Kasia Walicka Maimone, Denise Andres, Rebecca Levin, Isabelle Simone, Rebecca Freund, and Sue Bakula (HBO); Love Story: John F. Kennedy Jr. & Carolyn Bessette: "The Wedding" – Rudy Mance, Natalie Turturro Mettouchi, Brittany Griffin, Moria Sine Clinton, and Liz Samuels (FX); Monster: The Ed Gein Story: "Mother!" – Joshua J. Marsh, Serrita Coleman, Michelle Matteo, Latrese Wright, Erin Fabian, and Sara Daubney-Kinney (Netflix)	**Outstanding Fantasy/Sci-Fi Costumes**: **Fallout: "The Strip" – Dayna Pink, Conan Castro, Annie Jewell, Imogene Chayes, and Christopher Lawrence (Prime Video)**; Alien: Earth: "Neverland" – Suttirat Larlarb, Pashelle Latino, Srirattana "Bew" Wattanavitkul, and Ampa "Tiew" Bunruaeng (FX); The Boys: "The Frenchman, the Female, and the Man Called Mother's Milk" – Michael Ground, Laura Jean Shannon, Kim Harkness, Emily McHugh, Sarah Mgeni, and Michelle Margolis Hallam (Prime Video); A Knight of the Seven Kingdoms: "Seven" – Lorna Ó Ríordáin, Libby Dempster, Kyle Callanan, Rachael Webb-Crozier, and Stephen O Rawe (HBO)
**Outstanding Contemporary Costumes for a Limited or Anthology Series or Movie**: **Beef: "All the Things We're Never Going to Have" – Olga Mill, Bailey Gardner, Sarah Basta, and Kellie Ishisaki (Netflix)**; The Beast in Me: "Elephant in the Room" – Arjun Bhasin, Emmanuelle Martin, and Alyssa Avellino-Faivre (Netflix); Black Rabbit: "The Black Rabbits" – Amy Westcott, Jessica Trejos, Min Ji Kim, and Amy Burt (Netflix); DTF St. Louis: "Cornhole" – Molly Maginnis, Nadia Durham, and Brenda Maben (HBO); Remarkably Bright Creatures – Carla Hetland, Laura Zydervelt, and Margaret Schliessler (Netflix)	**Outstanding Contemporary Costumes for a Series**: **Margo's Got Money Troubles: "Grudge Match" – Mirren Gordon-Crozier, Tracy Jarvis, Brooke Thatawat, Mallory Bradley, and Tara White (Apple TV)**; Emily in Paris: "Veni, Vidi, Venezia" – Marylin Fitoussi, Chloé Bartonio, Herehau Ragonneau, and Daniela Telle (Netflix); Hacks: "No New Tricks" – Kathleen Felix-Hager, Keely Crum, Colleen Washington, Shannon Felix, and Rory Cunningham (HBO Max); Only Murders in the Building: "After You" – Dana Covarrubias, Amy Burt, Abigail Geoghegan, and Liana John (Hulu); Wednesday: "Woe Me the Money" – Colleen Atwood, Mark Sutherland, Tom Hornsby, Robin Soutar, Connor Dalton, and Charlotte Child (Netflix)
**Outstanding Costumes for Variety, Nonfiction, or Reality Programming (Juried)**: **The Masked Singer: "Premiere Part 1" – Grainne O'Sullivan, Luke D'Alessandro, Steven Lee, Arleen Flores, Alice Garland, and Maro Isakulyan (Fox)**‡; **The Traitors: "The Black Banquet" – Sam Spector and Rikki Finlay (Peacock)**‡

=== Directing ===
Directing
**Outstanding Directing for a Limited or Anthology Series or Movie**: **DTF St. Louis – Steven Conrad (HBO)**; Beef: "It Will Stay This Way and You Will Obey" – Jake Schreier (Netflix); Beef: "Oh, the Comfort, the Inexpressible Comfort" – Lee Sung Jin (Netflix); Black Rabbit: "The Black Rabbits" – Jason Bateman (Netflix)	**Outstanding Directing for a Variety Series**: **The Late Show with Stephen Colbert: "The Late Show with Stephen Colbert Series Finale" – Yvonne De Mare (CBS)**; Jimmy Kimmel Live!: "Guests: Robert De Niro as The New FCC Chair, Glen Powell, and Musical Guest Sarah McLachlan" – Andy Fisher (ABC); Saturday Night Live: "Host: Olivia Rodrigo" – Liz Patrick (NBC)
**Outstanding Directing for a Variety Special**: **The Apple Music Super Bowl LX Halftime Show Starring Bad Bunny – Hamish Hamilton (NBC)**; Dave Chappelle: The Unstoppable... – Rikki Hughes (Netflix); Taylor Swift: The Eras Tour: The Final Show – Glenn Weiss (Disney+); 78th Annual Tony Awards – Glenn Weiss (CBS); Wanda Sykes: Legacy – Julie Dash (Netflix)	**Outstanding Directing for a Documentary/Nonfiction Program**: **My Mom Jayne: A Film by Mariska Hargitay – Mariska Hargitay (HBO)**; Marty, Life Is Short – Lawrence Kasdan (Netflix); Mel Brooks: The 99 Year Old Man! – Judd Apatow and Michael Bonfiglio (HBO Max); Mr. Scorsese: "All This Filming Isn't Healthy" – Rebecca Miller (Apple TV); Sean Combs: The Reckoning: "Pain vs Love" – Alexandria Stapleton (Netflix)
**Outstanding Directing for a Reality Program**: **The Traitors: "Let the Cards Fall as They Will" – Ben Archard (Peacock)**; The Amazing Race: "I'm Not a Big Fan of Olives" – Bertram van Munster (CBS); Love on the Spectrum: "Episode 1" – Cian O'Clery (Netflix); RuPaul's Drag Race: "Grand Finale" – Nick Murray (MTV); Top Chef: "Carolina Roots" – Anna Moulaison (Bravo)

=== Hairstyling ===
Hairstyling
**Outstanding Contemporary Hairstyling**: **Margo's Got Money Troubles: "Buddies" – Jaime Leigh McIntosh, Ahou Mofid, Celeste Gonzalez, Kim Santantonio, and R'riyana Kilne (Apple TV)**; All's Fair: "Oh, Jesus!" – Valerie Jackson, Linda Flowers, Sharif Poston, Dimitris Giannetos, and Michelle Ceglia (Hulu); Emily in Paris: "Veni, Vidi, Venezia" – Carole Nicolas, Mike Desir, Julien Parizet, Jay Durimel, and Miharu Oshima (Netflix); Euphoria: "The Ballad of Paladin" – Kimberly Kimble, Kendra Garvey, Kase Glenn, Marquita Lynch, and Stacy Schneiderman (HBO); Hacks: "No New Tricks" – Jennifer Bell (HBO Max); Wednesday: "Woe Me the Money" – Francesco Pegoretti, Sevlene Roddy, Marica Falso, Peter Burke, and Nirvana Jalalvand (Netflix)	**Outstanding Period or Fantasy/Sci-Fi Hairstyling**: **Bridgerton: "The Waltz" – Nic Collins, Giorgio Galliero, Jade Clarke, Valentina Nesti, Katharine Scott, and Laura Hartney (Netflix)**; Fallout: "The Strip" – Dennis Bailey, April Schuller, Katy McClintock, George Wilson, Raquel Bianchini, and Roma Goddard (Prime Video); The Gilded Age: "My Mind Is Made Up" – Sean Flanigan, Christine Fennell Harlan, Jonathan Zane-Sharpless, Tim Harvey, Aaron M. Kinchen, and Anika Seitu (HBO); A Knight of the Seven Kingdoms: "The Morrow" – Pippa Woods, Lucille Harding, Tamara Mae Richards-Bloomfield, Anna Knight, Cat Coogan, and Lauren Appleby (HBO); Palm Royale: "Maxine Drinks Martinis Now" – Karen Bartek, Brittany Madrigal, Tiffany Bloom, Anna Quinn, Jill Crosby, and Frida Aradottir (Apple TV)
**Outstanding Hairstyling for a Variety, Nonfiction or Reality Program (Juried)**: **RuPaul's Drag Race: "The Rate-A-Queen Talent Show, Part 2" – Suzette Boozer and Henry Sanchez (MTV)**; The Apple Music Super Bowl LX Halftime Show Starring Bad Bunny – Brian Steven Banks, Mariah Montes, Maaliq Amadeus Elliott, Shian Banks, Yvette Shelton, Iraina Crenshaw, Nikki Wright, and Paula Ashby (NBC); Dancing with the Stars: "Disney Night" – Kimi Messina, Marion Rogers, Joe Matke, Florence Witherspoon, Jerilynn Stephens, Amber Nicholle Maher, Brittany Spaulding, and Regina Rodriguez (ABC); Saturday Night Live: "Host: Glen Powell" – Jodi Mancuso, Cara Hannah, Inga Thrasher, Amanda Duffy Evans, Chad Harlow, Gina Ferrucci, Jennifer Serio, and Katie Beatty (NBC); Wicked: One Wonderful Night – Edward Morrison, R'riyana Kline, Tiffany Bloom, Lillie S. Frierson, Cyndra Dunn, Sharif Poston, Lisa Long, and Deborah Pierce (NBC)

=== Lighting Design / Lighting Direction ===
Lighting Design and Lighting Direction
**Outstanding Lighting Design / Lighting Direction for a Series**: **The Late Show with Stephen Colbert: "Guests: Bruce Springsteen, Special Surprise Guests" – Michael Scricca, Hillary Knox, Constantine Leonardos II, and Tom Carroll (CBS)**; Dancing with the Stars: "20th Birthday Party" – Noah Mitz, Madigan Stehly, Hannah Kerman, Will Gossett, Patrick Brazil, Joe Holdman, Matt Benson, Matt McAdam, Alan Pineda, and Kevin Faust (ABC); Jimmy Kimmel Live!: "Guests: Stephen Colbert, Seth Meyers, Kumail Nanjiani, Josh Meyers, And Musical Guest Reneé Rapp" – Craig Housenick, Darien Koop, James Worman, Ruben Escobar, and Guy Jones (ABC); Saturday Night Live: "Host: Ariana Grande" – Geoffrey Amoral, Rick McGuinness, Trevor Brown, Tim Stasse, William McGuinness, Frank Grisanti, and Reginald Campbell (NBC); The Voice: "Finale Part 2" – Oscar Dominguez, Johnny Bradley, Ronald K. Wirsgalla, Erin Anderson, Daniel K. Boland, Phillip "Gene" Webber, Andrew Munie, Vanessa Arciga, Jeff Shood, and Terrance Ho (NBC)	**Outstanding Lighting Design / Lighting Direction for a Special**: **The Apple Music Super Bowl LX Halftime Show Starring Bad Bunny – Al Gurdon, Ben Green, Harry Forster, Mark Humphrey, Eric Marchwinski, Alen Sisul, Lee Spencer, and Jason Rudolph (NBC)**; 68th Annual Grammy Awards – Noah Mitz, Madigan Stehly, Will Gossett, Hannah Kerman, Andy O'Reilly, Patrick Boozer, Ryan Tanker, Erin Anderson, Matt Benson, Matthew Cotter, Terrance Ho, and Guy Jones (CBS); The Oscars – Robert Dickinson, Noah Mitz, Ryan Tanker, Will Gossett, Jeff Behm, Tyler Ericson, Hannah Kerman, Andy O'Reilly, Akash Bartlett, Guy Jones, Kevin Faust, and Terrance Ho (ABC); 78th Annual Tony Awards – Robert Dickinson, Ed McCarthy, Tyler Ericson, Madigan Stehly, Harry Sangmeister, Chris Moeller, Jason Rudolph, JM Hurley, and Ka Lai Wong (CBS); Wicked: One Wonderful Night – Bryan Klunder, Noah Mitz, Andrew O'Reilly, Patrick Boozer, Ryan Healey, Alen Sisul, Mike Hankowsky, and Jason Rudolph (NBC)

=== Main Title and Motion Design ===
Main Title and Motion Design
**Outstanding Title Design**: **Spider-Noir – Mason Nicoll, Andrew Julien, Arik Weiss, Peter Pak, John Van Unen, Daniel Duda, Christian Arnsparger, and Rachel Brickel (MGM+ / Prime Video)**; It: Welcome to Derry – Aaron Becker, Seth Kleinberg, Troy Miller, Joseph Ahn, Michael Lo, Hsien Lun Su, Li-Yu Chen, and Lee Nelson (HBO); Murderbot – Hazel Baird, Rob Cawdery, Phil Davies, Ben Jones, Ethem Cem, Joe Paniagua, Lance Slaton, and Xiaolin Zeng (Apple TV); Ponies – Ronnie Koff, Kathy Liang, Fernando Lazzari, Charles Khoury, Christoph Gabathuler, Jeffrey Su, Min Shi, and Lexi Gunvaldson (Peacock); Smoke – Mason Nicoll, Peter Pak, Rachel Brickel, Ana Criado, Simon Chan, and Justin West (Apple TV); Young Sherlock – Ronnie Koff, Elizabeth Steinberg, Min Shi, Scott Bell, Henry Chang, Christoph Gabathuler, Charlie Proctor, and Lexi Gunvaldson (Prime Video)	**Outstanding Motion Design (Juried)** No award given

=== Makeup ===
Makeup
**Outstanding Contemporary Makeup (Non-Prosthetic)**: **Margo's Got Money Troubles: "Grudge Match" – Erin Ayanian Monroe, Michele Teleis, Bonni Flowers, Valli O'Reilly, and Angela Levin (Apple TV)**; All's Fair: "Oh, Jesus!" – Kate Biscoe, Tierra Richards, Victor Del Castillo, Chloe Sens, Naima Jamal, and Diana Shin (Hulu); Euphoria: "Kitty Likes to Dance" – Doniella Davy, Tara Lang Shah, Mara Rouse, and Leah Rial Sappington (HBO); Hacks: "Hacks" – Brittany White, Keith Sayer, Erin Blinn, and Veronica Rodarte (HBO Max); The Pitt: "1:00 P.M." – Merry Lee Traum, Marie Flore "Ri" Beaubien, and Leesa Simone (HBO Max); Wednesday: "Woe Me the Money" – Lynn Johnston, Elaine Hopkins, Helen Bailey, and Dorothy Campbell (Netflix)	**Outstanding Period or Fantasy/Sci-Fi Makeup (Non-Prosthetic)**: **Palm Royale: "Maxine Drinks Martinis Now" – Tricia Sawyer, Marissa Lafayette, Marie DelPrete, Rory Gaudio, Alyssa Goldberg, Marja Webster, and Simone Almekias-Siegl (Apple TV)**; Fallout: "The Strip" – Elisa Marsh, John Damiani, Jennifer Aspinall, Cynthia Hernandez, Kenneth Calhoun, Lisa Rocco, Sabine Roller Taylor, and Josh Foster (Prime Video); The Gilded Age: "My Mind Is Made Up" – Nicki Ledermann, Anette Lian-Williams, Jane DiPersio, Emily Maitland Marroquin, and Mareike Mohmand (HBO); Love Story: John F. Kennedy Jr. & Carolyn Bessette: "The Pools Party" – Milagros Medina-Cerdeira, Blair Aycock, D'angelo Thompson, and Jill Karol (FX); Monster: The Ed Gein Story: "The Babysitter" – Heather Koontz (Netflix)
**Outstanding Makeup for a Variety, Nonfiction or Reality Program**: **Saturday Night Live: "Host: Bad Bunny" – Louie Zakarian, Jason Milani, Amy Tagliamonti, Young Bek, Joanna Pisani, Madison Bermudez, and Waltaya Culmer (NBC)**; Dancing with the Stars: "Disney Night" – Julie Socash, Angela Moos, Brian Sipe, Vance Hartwell, Josh Foster, Alison Gladieux, Sarah Benjamin Hall, and Donna Bard (ABC); The Oscars – Bruce Grayson, Brielle McKenna, Rochelle Uribe, Julie Hassett, Jeong-Hwa Kim Fonkalsrud, Schuron Womack, Jill Cady, and Michelle deMilt (ABC)	**Outstanding Prosthetic Makeup**: **The Pitt: "9:00 P.M." – Myriam Arougheti, Arjen Tuiten, Thom Floutz, Chris Burgoyne, Martina Sykes, and Hanny Tjan (HBO Max)**; Fallout: "The Demon in the Snow" – Jake Garber, Greg Funk, Gregory Nicotero, Carey Jones, Vincent Van Dyke, Gabriel De Cunto, Kevin Wasner, and Scott Stoddard (Prime Video); Monster: The Ed Gein Story: "The Godfather" – Leo Corey Castellano, Mark Nieman, and Joseph Badiali (Netflix); Spider-Noir: "Betrayal" – Vincent Van Dyke, Ken Niederbaumer, Gabriel De Cunto, Stephen Prouty, Dave Snyder, Chris Gallaher, Jamie Kelman, and Gary J. Tunnicliffe (MGM+ / Prime Video); Stranger Things: "Chapter Four: Sorcerer" – Barrie Gower, Duncan Jarman, Michael Mekash, and Emma Faulkes (Netflix)

=== Music ===
Music
**Outstanding Music Composition for a Series (Original Dramatic Score)**: **Widow's Bay: "Our History" – David Fleming (Apple TV)**; A Knight of the Seven Kingdoms: "In the Name of the Mother" – Dan Romer (HBO); Palm Royale: "Maxine Drinks Martinis Now" – Jeff Toyne (Apple TV); Pluribus: "We Is Us" – Dave Porter (Apple TV); Slow Horses: "Missiles" – Daniel Pemberton and Toydrum (Apple TV); Spider-Noir: "Step into My Office" – Kris Bowers and Michael Dean Parsons (MGM+ / Prime Video)	**Outstanding Music Composition for a Limited or Anthology Series, Movie or Special (Original Dramatic Score)**: **The Beast in Me: "The Beast and Me" – Sean Callery and Sara Barone (Netflix)**; All Her Fault: "Episode 7" – Jeff Beal (Peacock); Black Rabbit: "Isle of Joy" – Danny Bensi and Saunder Jurriaans (Netflix); In the Blink of an Eye – Thomas Newman (Hulu); Washington Black: "If You See My Mama, Whisper Her This..." – Cameron Moody (Hulu)
**Outstanding Music Composition for a Documentary/Nonfiction or Reality Program (Original Dramatic Score)**: **John Candy: I Like Me – Tyler Strickland (Prime Video)**; High Horse: The Black Cowboy: "F*ck Westerns" – Raphael Saadiq (Peacock); Kingdom: "Episode 2" – Segun Akinola (BBC America); Mel Brooks: The 99 Year Old Man! – Jeff Morrow (HBO Max); Ocean with David Attenborough – Steven Price (Nat Geo); Prehistoric Planet: Ice Age: "The Big Freeze" – Kara Talve, Anže Rozman, and Hans Zimmer (Apple TV)	**Outstanding Music Direction**: **The Apple Music Super Bowl LX Halftime Show Starring Bad Bunny – Miguel Gandelman (NBC)**; The Late Show with Stephen Colbert: "The Late Show with Stephen Colbert Series Finale" – Louis Cato (CBS); The Oscars – Michael Bearden (ABC); Saturday Night Live: "Host: Jack Black" – Lenny Pickett, Leon Pendarvis, Eli Brueggemann, and Maddie Rice (NBC); Wicked: One Wonderful Night – Stephen Oremus (NBC)
**Outstanding Original Music and Lyrics**: **The Pitt: "12:00 P.M." – "Need Someone" by Gavin Brivik and Andrew Bird (HBO Max)**; The Boys: "The Frenchman, the Female, and the Man Called Mother's Milk" – "Raise Him Up" by Christopher Lennertz and Daveed Diggs (Prime Video); Hacks: "EGOT" – "Mis Figuritas" by Carlos Rafael Rivera and David Stal (HBO Max); South Park: "The Crap Out" – "Christian Woman" by Trey Parker (Comedy Central); Spider-Noir: "A Mistake I'll Never Make Again" – "The Devil You Know" by Warren Oak Felder, Sebastian Kole, and Daniel Pemberton (MGM+ / Prime Video); Wednesday: "Woe Me the Money" – "The Dead Dance" by Lady Gaga, Andrew Watt, and Henry Russell Walter (Netflix)	**Outstanding Original Main Title Theme Music**: **Pluribus – Dave Porter (Apple TV)**; All Her Fault – Jeff Beal (Peacock); The Beast in Me – Sean Callery (Netflix); The 'Burbs – Michael Abels (Peacock); Murderbot – Amanda Jones (Apple TV)
**Outstanding Music Supervision**: **Widow's Bay: "Beach Reads" – Toko Nagata (Apple TV)**; The Boys: "Blood and Bone" – Michelle Johnson and Yvette Metoyer (Prime Video); Hacks: "Hacks" – Matt Biffa (HBO Max); Nobody Wants This: "When Noah Met Joanne" – Manish Raval, Tom Wolfe, and Jonathan Leahy (Netflix); Pluribus: "We Is Us" – Thomas Golubić (Apple TV); Stranger Things: "Chapter Eight: The Rightside Up" – Nora Felder (Netflix)

=== Picture Editing ===
Picture Editing
**Outstanding Picture Editing for a Drama Series**: **Pluribus: "We Is Us" – Skip Macdonald (Apple TV)**; Euphoria: "In God We Trust" – Aaron I. Butler, Nikola Boyanov, Aleshka Ferrero, Julio C. Perez IV, and Kristin Valentine (HBO); The Pitt: "1:00 P.M." – Tamara Luciano (HBO Max); The Pitt: "9:00 P.M." – Mark Strand (HBO Max); Pluribus: "Got Milk" – Joey Liew (Apple TV); Pluribus: "Grenade" – Chris McCaleb (Apple TV); Task: "A Still Small Voice" – Keiko Deguchi and Amy E. Duddleston (HBO)	**Outstanding Picture Editing for a Multi-Camera Comedy Series**: **Leanne: "Having Big Feelings" – Russell Griffin (Netflix)**; The Neighborhood: "Welcome to the Zhuzh" – Chris Poulos and Tim DeLone (CBS); Shifting Gears: "Nutcracker" – Pamela Marshall (ABC); Tyler Perry's Assisted Living: "A Rolling Stone" – Jennifer Viola (BET); The Upshaws: "Election Day" – Angel Gamboa Bryant (Netflix)
**Outstanding Picture Editing for a Single-Camera Comedy Series**: **Hacks: "Hacks" – Jon Philpot (HBO Max)**; The Bear: "Bears" – Joanna Naugle (FX); Hacks: "The Cube" – Peggy Tachdjian (HBO Max); Widow's Bay: "Our History" – Isaac Hagy (Apple TV); Widow's Bay: "Welcome to Widow's Bay" – Kyle Reiter (Apple TV); Widow's Bay: "What to Expect on Your Trip" – Jen Bryson (Apple TV)	**Outstanding Picture Editing for a Limited or Anthology Series or Movie**: **DTF St. Louis: "No One's Normal. It Just Looks That Way from Across the Street" – Kevin D. Ross and Max Koepke (HBO)**; Beef: "All the Things We're Never Going to Have" – Laura Zempel (Netflix); Beef: "The Increasing Flimsiness of Any Certainties about the Future" – Lauren Connelly (Netflix); Black Rabbit: "Isle of Joy" – Vikash Patel (Netflix); Death by Lightning: "The Man from Ohio" – Joseph Krings, Anna Hauger, Michael Ruscio, Joe Leonard, Bridget Case, and Derek Desmond (Netflix)
**Outstanding Picture Editing for Variety Programming**: **The Muppet Show – Kelly Lyon (Disney+)**; Nikki Glaser: Good Girl – Guy Harding (Hulu); Ramy Youssef: In Love – Joanna Naugle (HBO); Taylor Swift: The Eras Tour: The Final Show – Dom Whitworth, Rupa Rathod, Benjamin Wainwright-Pearce, Michael Heubel, and Hamish Lyons (Disney+); Wanda Sykes: Legacy – Angela Gamboa Bryant (Netflix)	**Outstanding Picture Editing for Variety Programming (Segment)**: **The Late Show with Stephen Colbert: "The Late Show closes out its storied run at the Ed Sullivan Theater with help from Paul McCartney and Elvis Costello" – Andrew Matheson and Amanda Sprecher (CBS)**; The Daily Show: "RFK Hospital: An Original Series Inspired by the Medical Advice of RFK Jr." – Nikolai Johnson (Comedy Central); Last Week Tonight with John Oliver: "Moon Mammoths Game Documentary" – Ryan Barger (HBO); Saturday Night Live: "Home Alone" – Ryan Spears (NBC); Saturday Night Live: "MAHAspital (The New Pitt)" – Christopher Salerno and Mak Makower (NBC)
**Outstanding Picture Editing for a Nonfiction Program**: **Sean Combs: The Reckoning: "Blink Again" – Charles Divak, Evan Wise, Jack Gravina, Benji Kast, Adam Goldstein, Jonathan Miller, and Jeremy Siefer (Netflix)**; John Candy: I Like Me – Shane Reid, Darrin Roberts, and Dominick Rolandelli (Prime Video); Marty, Life Is Short – Sierra Neal and Bennett Piscitelli (Netflix); Mel Brooks: The 99 Year Old Man! – Joe Beshenkovsky (HBO Max); Mr. Scorsese: "Stranger in a Strange Land" – David Bartner and George O'Donnell (Apple TV)	**Outstanding Picture Editing for a Structured Reality or Competition Program**: **The Traitors: "The Death Conga" – David Moon, Patrick Owen, Matt Pratt, and James Seddon-Brown (Peacock)**; The Amazing Race – Eric Beetner, Kevin Blum, Kellen Cruden, Christina Fontana, Jay Gammill, Eric Goldfarb, Katherine Griffin, Darrick Lazo, Ryan Leamy, Josh Lowry, Steve Mellon, Michelle Ivan Messina, Jennifer Nelson, Paul C. Nielsen, and Steven Urrutia (CBS); RuPaul's Drag Race: "You Can't Keep a Good Drag Queen Down!" – Jamie Martin, Paul Cross, Ryan Mallick, and Michael Roha (MTV); Survivor – David Armstrong, Brian Barefoot, Chad Bertalotto, Bill Bowden, Evan Mediuch, Plowden Schumacher, Andrew Bolhuis, Andy Castor, James Ciccarello, Michael Greer, Frederick Hawthorne, Arek Hope, Catherine M. Johnson, Finian Shea Johnson, Raz Karakashian, Josh Lowry, Bob Mathews, Joubin Mortazavi, Tori Rodman-Geuthier, Francisco Santa Maria, Eric B. Shanks, and Jacob Teixeira (CBS); The Voice – Sean Basaman, John M. Larson, Robert M. Malachowski Jr., Matt Antell, John Baldino, Matthew Blair, Melissa Silva Borden, William Fabian Castro, Michael Chaskes, Norwood Cheek, Andrew Ciancia, Glen Ebesu, Rick Enrique, Greg Fitzsimmons, Stephen R. Frederick, Brian Freundlich, Noel A. Guerra, John Homesley, Omega Hsu, Niki Hunter, Ryan P. James, Lise Kearney, Alyssa Dressman Lehner, Terri Maloney, James J. Munoz, Rich Remis, Barry Murphy, Robby Thompson, Matt Wafaie, and Eric Wise (NBC)
**Outstanding Picture Editing for an Unstructured Reality Program**: **Love on the Spectrum: "Episode 4" – Marcus Kjellberg, Leanne Cole, Kim Lloyd, and John Rosser (Netflix)**; America's Sweethearts: Dallas Cowboys Cheerleaders – Stefanie Maridueña, Zachary Fuhrer, M Brennan, Noah DeBonis, James Atkinson, Kate Hackett, Deijah Lee-Carroll, Susie Maridueña Barrett, Sharon Weaver, and Helen Yum (Netflix); Deadliest Catch: "Kings of the Frozen North" – Isaiah Camp, Hugh Elliott, Rob Butler, Josh Stockero, Alexander Rubinow, Nico Natale, and Don Pollard (Discovery); RuPaul's Drag Race: Untucked: "Red Carpet Mash-ups" – Miguel Siqueiros and Jimmy Bazan (MTV); Welcome to Wrexham: "Do a Wrexham" – Michael Oliver, Matt Wafaie, Thomas Czupryna, Asher Glaser, Jenny Krochmal, Mohamed El Manasterly, Stacie Schwarz, and Steve Welch (FX)

=== Sound Editing ===
Sound Editing
**Outstanding Sound Editing for a Comedy or Drama Series (One Hour)**: **Spider-Noir: "The Man in the Mask" – Ethan Beigel, Andy Sisul, Will Digby, Ryan Collins, Arielle McGrail, Caitlin Lutenske, DeVaughn Watts, Sanaa Kelley, and Matt Salib (MGM+ / Prime Video)**; Alien: Earth: "Neverland" – Lee Gilmore, Bradley North, Chris Terhune, Nolan McNaughton, Justin M. Davey, Byron Wilson, Tim Walston, Matt "Smokey" Cloud, Beso Kacharava, Ben Schor, and Biko Gogaladze (FX); The Boys: "Blood and Bone" – Wade Barnett, Ryan Briley, Russell Topal, Luis Galdames, Lisle Engle, Christopher Brooks, Joe Sabella, and Jesi Ruppel (Prime Video); Fallout: "The Strip" – Sue Gamsaragan Cahill, Daniel Colman, Joseph Fraioli, Jane Boegel-Koch, Sara Bencivenga, James Parnell, Randall Guth, Christopher Kaller, Pamela Kahn, Dominique Decaudain, and Alex Ullrich (Prime Video); Stranger Things: "Chapter Eight: The Rightside Up" – Craig Henighan, William Files, Dave Grimaldi, Lee Gilmore, Ryan Cole, Polly McKinnon, Emma Present, Angelo Palazzo, Katie Halliday, Christopher Bonis, Nick Interlandi, Matt "Smokey" Cloud, Gina Wark, Lena Glikson, David Klotz, and Steve Baine (Netflix)	**Outstanding Sound Editing for a Comedy or Drama Series (Half-Hour) and Animation**: **Widow's Bay: "What to Expect on Your Trip" – Matt Yocum, Sang Kim, Goeun Everett, Ryan Sullivan, Nick Seaman, Nate Underkuffler, Leslie Bloome, and Shaun Brennan (Apple TV)**; A Knight of the Seven Kingdoms: "In the Name of the Mother" – Alastair Sirkett, Martin Cantwell, Michele Woods, Adéle Fletcher, Ruth Knight, Neil Stemp, Louise Burton, Barnaby Smyth, and Rebecca Glover (HBO); Murderbot: "All Systems Red" – Tyler Whitham, Danielle McBride, Ève Corrêa-Guedes, Craig MacLellan, Marcelle Simpson, Nicholas Fitzgerald, and John Elliot (Apple TV); Predator: Killer of Killers – Chris Terhune, William Files, James Miller, Justin M. Davey, Lee Gilmore, Jessie Anne Spence, Daniel DiPrima, Stephen Perone, Adam DeCoster, and Noel Vought (Hulu); Star Wars: Maul – Shadow Lord: "Chapter 10: The Dark Lord" – David W. Collins, Kevin Bolen, Bill Rudolph, Michael Brinkman, Frank Rinella, Kimberly Patrick, and Eli Denson (Disney+)
**Outstanding Sound Editing for a Limited or Anthology Series, Movie or Special**: **Beef: "It Will Stay This Way and You Will Obey" – Christopher Gomez, Danika Wikke, Jerry Lafuente, Yurii Kerelius, Luke Dennis, and Danylo Gomlez (Netflix)**; The Beast in Me: "Sick Puppy" – Ruy Garcia, Marcello Dubaz, Marissa Littlefield, Isaac Derfel, Otis Streeter, Jo Caron, James Sizemore, and Guy Francoeur (Netflix); Lord of the Flies: "Piggy" – Niv Adiri, Tom Sayers, Linda Forsén, Phil Freudenfeld, Kirsty Graham, Paolo Pavesi, Zoe Freed, and Rebecca Heathcote (Netflix); The Rip – Daniel Pagan, Craig Mann, Chase Keehn, Jon Title, Russell Topal, Randy Wilson, Justin Helle, Sam Zeines, Stefan Fraticelli, and Jason Charbonneau (Netflix); Tom Clancy's Jack Ryan: Ghost War – Lewis Goldstein, Alfred DeGrand, Tyler Newhouse, Rebeca Lindenfeld, Bennett Kerr, Marcello Dubaz, Patrick Cicero, Henry Butler, Paul Urmson, Wen-Hsuan Tseng, Annie Taylor, Nicholas Kmet, and Leslie Bloome (Prime Video)	**Outstanding Sound Editing for a Nonfiction or Reality Program**: **Ocean with David Attenborough – George Fry, Roy Noy, Jonathon Cawte, and Chris Domaille (Nat Geo)**; Billy Joel: And So It Goes – Gregg Swiatlowski, Tim Obzud, Shari Johanson, and Debora Lilavois (HBO); John Candy: I Like Me – Jonathan Greber and Christopher Lafaye (Prime Video); Mel Brooks: The 99 Year Old Man! – Bobby Mackston, Miriam Cole Manselle, John Mackston, Matt Temple, and Andres Locsey (HBO Max); World War II with Tom Hanks: "The Beginning" – Luke Hatfield (History)

=== Sound Mixing ===
Sound Mixing
**Outstanding Sound Mixing for a Comedy or Drama Series (One Hour)**: **Pluribus: "We Is Us" – Larry Benjamin, Tim Hoogenakker, Phillip W. Palmer, Dave Porter, Ron Mellegers, and Judah Getz (Apple TV)**; Fallout: "The Strip" – Keith Rogers, Steve Bucino, Ed Novick, and Mike Marino (Prime Video); The Pitt: "8:00 P.M." – Todd Grace, Edward C. Carr III, Von Varga, Tami Treadwell, and Alex Jongbloed (HBO Max); Spider-Noir: "Step into My Office" – Nick Offord, Ryan Collins, Matthew Sanchez, Jordan McClain, Scott Michael Smith, and Aaron Hasson (MGM+ / Prime Video); Stranger Things: "Chapter Eight: The Rightside Up" – Mark Paterson, William Files, Steve Neal, Michael P. Clark, Hector Carlos Ramirez, and Peter Persaud (Netflix)	**Outstanding Sound Mixing for a Limited or Anthology Series or Movie**: **Beef: "It Will Stay This Way and You Will Obey" – Penny Harold, Andy Lange, Devendra Cleary, Sean O'Malley, Jongkun Park, Judah Getz, and Illia Popel (Netflix)**; Black Rabbit: "Isle of Joy" – Larry Benjamin, Tim Hoogenakker, James Weidner, Phil McGowan, Paul Drenning, and Ron Mellegers (Netflix); DTF St. Louis: "Amphezyne" – John W. Cook II, James Parnell, Akira Fukasawa, Fernanda Domene, James Howe, and Alex Wurman (HBO); Lord of the Flies: "Piggy" – Niv Adiri, Ande Schurr, Glen Gathard, Tristan Rose, Mark Appleby, and James Bishop (Netflix); Monster: The Ed Gein Story: "Sick as Your Secrets" – Jamie Hardt, Christina "Chuyue" Wen, Jose Garcia, Mario M. Coletta, Jamison Rabbe, and Jacob McNaughton (Netflix)
**Outstanding Sound Mixing for a Comedy or Drama Series (Half-Hour) and Animation**: **Widow's Bay: "What to Expect on Your Trip" – Tim Hoogenakker, Larry Benjamin, Kevin Parker, Scott Michael Smith, Judah Getz, and Ryan Collison (Apple TV)**; The Bear: "Scallop" – Steve "Major" Giammaria, Scott D. Smith, Patrick Christensen, Ryan Collison, and Connor Nagy (FX); Hacks: "The Garden" – John W. Cook II, James Parnell, Jim Lakin, Fernanda Domene, David Stal, and Jacob McNaughton (HBO Max); Shrinking: "I Will Be Grape" – Earl Martin, Anna D. Wilborn, Jamison Rabbe, Tami Treadwell, Jeffrey Roy, and Alex Jongbloed (Apple TV); Tires: "The Tri-State Mid Market Tire Expo" – Brian Bracken and Jackson Derbish (Netflix)	**Outstanding Sound Mixing for a Variety Series or Special**: **The Apple Music Super Bowl LX Halftime Show Starring Bad Bunny – Thomas Holmes, Alex Guessard, Dave Natale, Christian Schrader, Thomas Pesa, and Pablo Munguia (NBC)**; The Late Show with Stephen Colbert: "The Late Show with Stephen Colbert Series Finale" – Jim Murray, Harvey Goldberg, Greg Allen, Alan Bonomo, and Jonathan Herrera (CBS); The Muppet Show – Christopher Neely, John Chamberlin, Sean Madsen, Jordan McClain, Sanaa Kelley, and David Michel-Ruddy (Disney+); The Oscars – Paul Sandweiss, Tommy Vicari, Biff Dawes, Steve Genewick, Pablo Munguia, Patrick Baltzell, Mike Parker, Tom Pesa, John Perez, Shane O'Connor, and Kristian Pedregon (ABC); Taylor Swift: The Eras Tour: The Final Show – David Payne and John Ross (Disney+)
**Outstanding Sound Mixing for a Nonfiction Program**: **Billy Joel: And So It Goes – Bob Chefalas, Mark Mandler, David Mitlyng, Michael Stewart, Bradshaw Leigh, Brian Ruggles, and Jay Vicari (HBO)**; John Candy: I Like Me – Gary A. Rizzo, Brad Dawe, Michael Kool, Mark Leone, Thomas Nino Orozco, and Donny Tam (Prime Video); Mel Brooks: The 99 Year Old Man! – Brad Bergbom, Dave McJunkin, Alenka Pavlin, Kevin Rosen-Quan, Earl Martin, and Brian Tarlecki (HBO Max); Ocean with David Attenborough – Graham Wild and Oliver Baldwin (Nat Geo); Tucci in Italy: "Naples & Campania" – Ben Newth and Christopher Syner (Nat Geo)	**Outstanding Sound Mixing for a Reality Program**: **Welcome to Wrexham: "Do a Wrexham" – Mark Jensen (FX)**; The Amazing Race – Jim Ursulak, Allie Boettger, Paul Bruno, John Buchanan, Molefi Jerry Chabane, Dean Gaveau, Ryan P. Kelly, Marcus Lominy, Mickey McMullen, Sean Milburn, Simon Paine, John A. Pitron, Jeff Zipp, Ryan Gerle, Troy Smith, Freddie DiPasquale, Chase Mollak, and Jody Stillwater (CBS); Deadliest Catch: "Kings of the Frozen North" – Jared Robbins (Discovery); RuPaul's Drag Race: "Fannie: The Hard Knock Ball Rusical" – David Nolte, Gregory Keslake, Ryan Brady, Erik Valenzuela, and Sal Ojeda (MTV); The Voice: "The Blind Auditions Premiere" – Michael Abbott, Jeff Fusting, Randy Faustino, Tim Hatayama, Shaun Sebastian, Ryan Young, and Phil DeTolve (NBC)

=== Special Visual Effects ===
Special Visual Effects
**Outstanding Special Visual Effects in a Season or a Movie**: **Stranger Things – Betsy Paterson, Michael Maher, Sean Ames, Craig Seitz, Tessa Roehl, Chloe Lipp, Brad Tobler, Martin Hill, Richard Thwaites, Bill Georgiou, Jessica Smith, and Mark Hawker (Netflix)**; Alien: Earth – Jonathan Rothbart, James Ledwell, Mitchell Callisch, Woei Lee, David Fletcher, Jeffrey A. Okun, Chris Ritvo, Viktor Müller, Aladino Debert, Will Towle, Ryan Freer, and Maksim Došlo (FX); Foundation – Chris MacLean, Jack Geist, Gabriel Sanchez, Stephan Schaefholz, Arnaud Brisebois, Carlos Monzon, Mathieu Assemat, Stephen Elphick, Jindřich Červenka, Damien Hurgon, Ed Bruce, and Jan Rejnuš (Apple TV); It: Welcome to Derry – Daryl Sawchuk, Steve Dellerson, Pier Lefebvre, Jordan Schilling, Steven Tether, Darcy Callaghan, Zena Bielewicz, Eric Withee, Maria Sartzetaki, Sebastien Chartier, Ben King, and Lara Ramirez (HBO); Monarch: Legacy of Monsters – Sean Konrad, Elizabeth Willaman, Bryn Morrow, Marc Varisco, Bryan Hirota, Pier Lefebvre, Cody Baker, Julian Summers, Kelly Redmond, Jeremy Burns, Lara Bannister, and Jourdan Biziou (Apple TV); Prehistoric Planet: Ice Age – Russell Dodgson, Andrew R. Jones, Rupert Smith, Tracey Gibbons, Benjamin Loch, Francois Dumoulin, Romain Rico, Gavin McKenzie, Brian Fisher, Alvise Avati, Adrien Annesley, and Liam Russell (Apple TV)	**Outstanding Special Visual Effects in a Single Episode**: **Spider-Noir: "Nightmare on a Gurney" – Hnedel Maximore, Brooke Noska, Adam Rothstein, Timothy Hanson, Jorge Macias, Taylor Faulkinberry, Joseph C Bond IV, Suzie Askham, Tommy Tran, Cameron Neilson, Adam Balentine, and Sebastiano D'Aprile (MGM+ / Prime Video)**; Gen V: "New Year, New U" – Karen Heston, Sean Tompkins, Clara Hill, Dane Collier, Andrew Simmonds, Oliver Eikhoff, Matthew Novak, Bhanu Prakash, and Hudson Kenny (Prime Video); A Knight of the Seven Kingdoms: "In the Name of the Mother" – Arron Roebuck, Paul Russo, Luke Dhand, Angel Rico Riesgo, Sonsoles L. Aranguren, Rocío Ruiz de Azúa, Mike Dawson, Tom Lloyd, and Paul Tuersley (HBO); Paradise: "Exodus" – John Weckworth, John Stewart, Chapel Folger, John Brennick, Evan Underwood, Christian Day, Chris Messineo, Scott Gastellu, Linda Tremblay, Meliza Fermin, Kristofer Cross, and Blair Foord (Hulu); The Walking Dead: Daryl Dixon: "Costa da Morte" – Jao M'Changama, Justine Paynat-Sautivet, Sébastien Voisin, Tim Binmoeller, Vanya Karamehmedović, Xavier Allard, Cem Olcer, Mathieu Legros, Mathieu Malard, Pau Costa, Brett Tierney, and Keith Pullman (AMC)

=== Stunts ===
Stunt Coordination
**Outstanding Stunt Coordination for Comedy Programming**: **Spider-Noir – Freddy Bouciegues and Hugh Aodh O'Brien (MGM+ / Prime Video)**; Beef – Shauna Duggins and Chris O'Hara (Netflix); Palm Royale – Mallory Thompson (Apple TV); Peacemaker – Hank Amos and Dave Macomber (HBO Max); Poker Face – Tom Place (Peacock); Tulsa King – Freddie Poole (Paramount+)	**Outstanding Stunt Coordination for Drama Programming**: **The Boys – John Koyama (Prime Video)**; Fallout – Casey O'Neill and Josh Kemble (Prime Video); FBI – Victor Paguia (CBS); The Rookie – David Rowden Sr. (ABC); Stranger Things – Hiro Koda and Jahnel Curfman (Netflix)
**Outstanding Stunt Performance**: **A Knight of the Seven Kingdoms: "In the Name of the Mother" – Zach Roberts, Gyula Tóth, Chris Cox, and Jake Cox (HBO)**; Fallout: "The Profligate" – Jeremy Fitzgerald and Tim Soergel (Prime Video); FBI: "Crusader" – Adam Shippey, Hannah Scott, Bryce Biederman, and Chris Barnes (CBS); Palm Royale: "Maxine Finds Herself" – Sonja Wajih and Colby Lemmo (Apple TV); Spider-Noir: "Tread Lightly" – Solomon Brende, Jimmy Chhiu, Micaiah Chau, and Kyle Potter (MGM+ / Prime Video)

=== Technical Direction ===
Technical Direction
**Outstanding Technical Direction and Camerawork for a Series**: **The Late Show with Stephen Colbert: "The Late Show with Stephen Colbert Series Finale" – Karen Obel Cape, Brian Cimino, Joe Debonis, John Harrison, Wade Latz, Dante Pagano, and John Hannel (CBS)**; The Daily Show: "Musical Guest: Viagra Boys" – Michael Williams, Jeff Latonero, Matt Muro, Phil Salanto, Michael Schmehl, Tim Quigley, and Rich York (Comedy Central); Dancing with the Stars: "20th Birthday Party" – Charles Ciup, Ron Brasi, Daryl Studebaker, Bettina Levesque, Kary D'Alessandro, Bruce Green, Rob Palmer, Daniel Schade, Nathanial Havholm, Mike Carr, Ed Horton, Easter Xua, Brian Reason, Adam Margolis, Jonas Brueling, Dave Levisohn, Jimmy Garcia, Damien Tuffereau, Emilie Pesante, and Ron Lehman (ABC); Jimmy Kimmel Live!: "Guests: Stephen Colbert, Seth Meyers, Kumail Nanjiani, Josh Meyers, and Musical Guest Reneé Rapp" – Ervin D. Hurd, David Fernandez, Tim Farmer, Steve Garrett, Mark Gonzales, Greg Grouwinkel, Garrett Hurt, Kris Wilson, Bernd Reinhardt, Marc Stumpo, and George Feucht (ABC); Saturday Night Live: "Host: Olivia Rodrigo" – Bill DiGiovanni, John Pinto, Paul Cangialosi, Anthony Tarantino, Dave Driscoll, Brian Phraner, and Daniel Erbeck (NBC)	**Outstanding Technical Direction and Camerawork for a Special**: **The Apple Music Super Bowl LX Halftime Show Starring Bad Bunny – Rod Wardell, Eric Becker, Dylan Sanford, Rob Balton, Danny Bonilla, Keith Dicker, Sean Flannery, Jeremy Freeman, Kevin French, Helena Jackson, Martin Kitchen, Bettina Levesque, David Plakos, Matt Roe, Jofre Rosero, Keyan Safyari, Monte Seaborn, Matt Trujillo, Brad Zerbst, Scott I. Acosta, Santiago Benet, Gilberto Cruz, Robert Smith, Cody Taylor, Kevin Denning, Andrew Moore, Rick Compeau, Su-Jeng Sang, Chris Hill, Matt Conrad, and Adam Lighterman (NBC)**; The Oscars – Danny Bonilla, Bob Del Russo, Sean Flannery, Shaun Harkins, Nathanial Havholm, Helena Jackson, Dave Kanehann, Jay Kulick, Adam Margolis, David Plakos, Jofre Rosero, Keyan Safyari, Dylan Sanford, Matthew Trujillo, Suzie Weis, Mark Whitman, Easter Xua, Scott Marshall, Eric Becker, John Pritchett, Tore Livia, Kenneth Shapiro, and Rod Wardell (ABC); Rock & Roll Hall of Fame Induction 2025 – Eric Becker, Dylan Sanford, David Rudd, Jofre Rosero, Easter Xua, Nathanial Havholm, John Porter, Sean Flannery, Zachariah Jones, Dave Levisohn, Kary D'Alessandro, Jeff Johnson, Rob Palmer, David Eastwood, Danny Bonilla, Danny Webb, Keith Dicker, Chad Smith, David Plakos, and Jeremy Freeman (ABC); Taylor Swift: The Eras Tour: The Final Show – Eric Becker, Brett Turnbull, Danny Bonilla, Mike Dinsmore, Chris Ferguson, Josh Fisch, Sean Flannery, Freddie Frederick, Shane Geddes, Manny Gutierrez, Jonny Harkins, Shaun Harkins, Christopher Johnson, Jeff Johnson, Ian Kerr, Jay Kulick, Tore Livia, Gallant Ly, Adam Margolis, Steve Martyniuk, Rob Palmer, Karin Pelloni, David Plakos, Carly Plett, Tim Quigley, Brian Reason, Paul Sapsis, Kate Smith, Jim van Dijk, Victor Wong, and Richard York (Disney+); Wicked: One Wonderful Night – Brandon Smith, Brett Turnbull, Rob Palmer, Karin Pelloni, Bobby Del Russo, Cary Symmons, Dean Clish, Jorge Ferris, Suzanne Ebner, Andrew Georgopoulos, Danny Bonilla, Chad Smith, Jonny Harkins, Alex Hernandez, Rob Vuona, Scott Acosta, Randy Gomez Jr., Jeremy Freeman, and Tim Farmer (NBC)

=== Writing ===
Writing
**Outstanding Writing for a Limited or Anthology Series or Movie**: **DTF St. Louis – Steven Conrad (HBO)**; All Her Fault: "Episode 8" – Megan Gallagher (Peacock); The Beast in Me: "Sick Puppy" – Gabe Rotter and Daniel Pearle (Netflix); Beef: "All the Things We're Never Going to Have" – Lee Sung Jin (Netflix); Death by Lightning – Mike Makowsky (Netflix)	**Outstanding Writing for a Variety Series**: **The Late Show with Stephen Colbert (CBS)**; Jimmy Kimmel Live! (ABC); Last Week Tonight with John Oliver (HBO)
**Outstanding Writing for a Variety Special**: **The Muppet Show – Albertina Rizzo, Gabe Liedman, Nedaa Sweiss, Kelly Younger, and Andrew Williams (Disney+)**; Chris Fleming: Live at the Palace – Chris Fleming (HBO); Nikki Glaser: Good Girl – Nikki Glaser (Hulu); The Oscars – Amberia Allen, Jose Arroyo, Josh Comers, Dan Cronin, Jessie Gaskell, Skyler Higley, Berkley Johnson, Ian Karmel, Brian Kiley, Laurie Kilmartin, Carol Leifer, Todd Levin, Jon Macks, Conan O'Brien, Matt O'Brien, Agathe Panaretos, Mike Sweeney, Levi MacDougall, and Eric Roth (ABC); Wanda Sykes: Legacy – Wanda Sykes (Netflix)	**Outstanding Writing for a Nonfiction Program**: **The Daily Show Presents: Jordan Klepper Fingers the Pulse: Give the Man a Prize – Jen Flanz, Ian Berger, Zhubin Parang, Devin Delliquanti, Scott Sherman, and Jordan Klepper (Comedy Central)**; The American Revolution: "Episode One: In Order to Be Free (May 1754 – May 1775)" – Geoffrey C. Ward (PBS); The Reluctant Traveler with Eugene Levy: "Living the Royal Life in the UK" – David Reilly and Christine Rose (Apple TV)

=== Legacy Award ===
- **I Love Lucy**

=== Multiple nominations and wins ===
==== By program ====
For the purposes of the lists below, any wins in juried categories are assumed to have a prior nomination.

Programs with multiple Creative Arts nominations
Nominations	Program	Network
17	Hacks	HBO Max
13	Beef	Netflix
13	The Pitt	HBO Max
12	DTF St. Louis	HBO
12	Pluribus	Apple TV
12	Widow's Bay	Apple TV
11	Spider-Noir	MGM+ / Prime Video
10	Saturday Night Live	NBC
9	The Apple Music Super Bowl LX Halftime Show Starring Bad Bunny	NBC
9	Fallout	Prime Video
9	The Oscars	ABC
8	A Knight of the Seven Kingdoms	HBO
8	The Late Show with Stephen Colbert	CBS
8	Palm Royale	Apple TV
8	RuPaul's Drag Race	MTV
7	Stranger Things	Netflix
6	The Beast in Me	Netflix
6	Black Rabbit	Netflix
6	Euphoria	HBO
6	Mel Brooks: The 99 Year Old Man!	HBO
6	Monster: The Ed Gein Story	Netflix
6	The Muppet Show	Disney+
6	Ocean with David Attenborough	Nat Geo
6	The Traitors	Peacock
6	Wednesday	Netflix
6	Wicked: One Wonderful Night	NBC
5	All Her Fault	Peacock
5	The Amazing Race	CBS
5	The Bear	FX
5	The Boys	Prime Video
5	The Gilded Age	HBO
5	Jimmy Kimmel Live!	ABC
5	John Candy: I Like Me	Prime Video
5	Love on the Spectrum	Netflix
5	Taylor Swift: The Eras Tour: The Final Show	Disney+
4	Alien: Earth	FX
4	Bridgerton	Netflix
4	Dancing with the Stars	ABC
4	Death by Lightning	Netflix
4	Margo's Got Money Troubles	Apple TV
4	78th Annual Tony Awards	CBS
4	Shrinking	Apple TV
4	Slow Horses	Apple TV
4	Survivor	CBS
4	Welcome to Wrexham	FX
3	68th Annual Grammy Awards	CBS
3	Love Story: John F. Kennedy Jr. & Carolyn Bessette	FX
3	Marty, Life Is Short	Netflix
3	Mr. Scorsese	Apple TV
3	My Mom Jayne: A Film by Mariska Hargitay	HBO
3	Murderbot	Apple TV
3	Nikki Glaser: Good Girl	Hulu
3	Only Murders in the Building	Hulu
3	Paradise	Hulu
3	Sean Combs: The Reckoning	Netflix
3	South Park	Comedy Central
3	Top Chef	Bravo
3	Tucci in Italy	Nat Geo
3	The Voice	NBC
3	Wanda Sykes: Legacy	Netflix
2	All's Fair	Hulu
2	America's Sweethearts: Dallas Cowboys Cheerleaders	Netflix
2	The American Revolution	PBS
2	Billy Joel: And So It Goes	HBO
2	Celebrity Family Feud	ABC
2	The Daily Show	Comedy Central
2	The Daily Show: Desi Lydic Foxsplains	YouTube
2	The Daily Show Presents: Jordan Klepper Fingers the Pulse: Give the Man a Prize	Comedy Central
2	Dave Chappelle: The Unstoppable...	Netflix
2	Deadliest Catch	Discovery
2	The Diplomat	Netflix
2	Emily in Paris	Netflix
2	FBI	CBS
2	Genndy Tartakovsky's Primal	Adult Swim
2	It: Welcome to Derry	HBO
2	Jeopardy!	ABC / Syndication
2	Last Week Tonight with John Oliver	HBO
2	Leanne	Netflix
2	Lord of the Flies	Netflix
2	Prehistoric Planet: Ice Age	Apple TV
2	The Randy Rainbow Show	YouTube
2	The Reluctant Traveler with Eugene Levy	Apple TV
2	Remarkably Bright Creatures	Netflix
2	RuPaul's Drag Race: Untucked	MTV
2	The Simpsons	Fox
2	The Tale of Silyan	Nat Geo
2	Task	HBO
2	Tom Clancy's Jack Ryan: Ghost War	Prime Video
2	The Upshaws	Netflix
2	Who Wants to Be a Millionaire	ABC
2	The Yogurt Shop Murders	HBO

Programs with multiple Creative Arts wins
Wins	Program	Network
8	Widow's Bay	Apple TV
7	The Apple Music Super Bowl LX Halftime Show Starring Bad Bunny	NBC
6	DTF St. Louis	HBO
6	The Traitors	Peacock
5	The Late Show with Stephen Colbert	CBS
5	Spider-Noir	MGM+ / Prime Video
4	The Muppet Show	Disney+
4	The Pitt	HBO Max
4	Pluribus	Apple TV
3	Beef	Netflix
3	Love on the Spectrum	Netflix
3	Margo's Got Money Troubles	Apple TV
3	Palm Royale	Apple TV
2	Bridgerton	Netflix
2	Fallout	Prime Video
2	Genndy Tartakovsky's Primal	Adult Swim
2	My Mom Jayne: A Film by Mariska Hargitay	HBO
2	Ocean with David Attenborough	Nat Geo

==== By network ====
Networks with multiple Creative Arts nominations
Nominations	Network
95	Netflix
87	HBO / HBO Max
58	Apple TV
38	Prime Video
32	ABC
30	CBS
29	NBC
18	FX
16	Peacock
15	Disney+
15	Hulu
12	Nat Geo
11	MGM+
10	MTV
7	Comedy Central
6	YouTube
5	PBS
4	Adult Swim
4	Bravo
4	Fox
2	Discovery
2	Meta Quest
2	Paramount+
2	Syndicated

Networks with multiple Creative Arts wins
Wins	Network
19	Apple TV
16	HBO / HBO Max
13	Netflix
8	NBC
6	Peacock
6	Disney+
5	CBS
5	MGM+
5	Prime Video
3	FX
3	Nat Geo
2	Adult Swim
2	Comedy Central
2	PBS
2	YouTube
