= Primetime Emmy Award for Outstanding Sound Editing for a Nonfiction or Reality Program =

Television award category

- Awarded for: Outstanding Outstanding Sound Editing for a Nonfiction or Reality Program
- Country: United States
- Presented by: Academy of Television Arts & Sciences
- Currently held by: Ocean with David Attenborough (2026)
- Website: emmys.com

The Primetime Emmy Award for Outstanding Outstanding Sound Editing for a Nonfiction or Reality Program is awarded to one television documentary, nonfiction or reality series each year.

In the following list, the first titles listed in gold are the winners; those not in gold are nominees, which are listed in alphabetical order. The years given are those in which the ceremonies took place:

== Winners and nominations ==
=== 1970s ===
Year	Program	Episode	Nominees	Network
1974	Outstanding Individual Achievement in Any Area of Creative Technical Crafts (Note: As a juried award, nominees had to garner 50% approval to win the award.)			
1974	Wide World in Concert		Doug Nelson, Norm Schwartz	ABC

=== 1990s ===
Year	Program	Episode	Nominees	Network
1995	Outstanding Individual Achievement - Informational Programming (Note: As a juried award, nominees had to garner 50% approval to win the award. The nominees did not meet the benchmark and no award was given.)			
1995	30 Years of National Geographic Specials		Mark Linden, Paul Schremp, Eric Williams	NBC
1996	Outstanding Individual Achievement - Informational Programming (Note: As a juried award, nominees had to garner 50% approval to win the award. The nominees did not meet the benchmark and no award was given.)			
1996	The Beatles Anthology	"Part 2"	Danny Longhurst, Andy Matthews	ABC
1998	Rat		Patrick M. Griffith, Lisa Hannan, Paul N. J. Ottosson	TBS
1998	4 Little Girls		Glenfield Payne, Eugene Gearty, Maisie Weissman	HBO
1999	Avalanche: The White Death		Cory Taylor, Mark Korba, Al Decker, Michael Marion	NBC
1999	Why Dogs Smile & Chimpanzees Cry		Derek Luff, George Leyva, Rick Norman	Discovery
1999	The Farm: Angola, USA		Margaret Crimmins, Paul Hsu	A&E

=== 2000s ===
Year	Program	Episode	Nominees	Network
2000	Walking with Dinosaurs		Andrew Sherriff, Simon Gotel	Discovery
2000	Raising the Mammoth		Derek Luff, Rick Norman, Tania Wang, George Leyva, Glen Frazier, Emmanuel Mairesse, Mohamed Amrane, Benoît Hénaff	Discovery
2001	Allosaurus: A Walking with Dinosaurs Special		Andrew Sherriff, Simon Gotel, Ashley Bates	Discovery
2001	Jazz	"Dedicated to Chaos"	Ira Spiegel, Dan Korintus, Bruce Kitzmeyer, Jacob Ribicoff	PBS
2001	Living Dolls: The Making of a Child Beauty Queen		Charlton McMillan	HBO
2001	Shooting War		Al Decker, Mark Korba, Michael Marion, Mark Linden, Tara A. Paul, Bryan McKenzie, Joan Rowe	ABC
2001	Trauma: Life in the E.R.	"Trauma Season"	Chuck Hammer, Matthew Barbato, Benny Mouthon	TLC
2002	When Dinosaurs Roamed America		Michael Payne, David Esparza, Nancy Nugent, Jonathan Wareham	Discovery
2002	The Blue Planet	"The Deep"	Lucy Rutherford	Discovery
2002	In Memoriam: New York City		Stuart Stanley	HBO
2002	9/11		Ray Palagy, Tony Pipitone, Neil Cedar, John Bowen, Philippe Desloovere, John Hassler	CBS
2002	The True Story of Black Hawk Down		Andrew McCracken, Paul Ray, Patrick McNulty	History
2003	Expedition: Bismarck		David Kitchens, Ben Zarai, Gonzalo Espinoza, Eric Lalicata, Chris McDonough, Eric Reuveni, Matthias Weber	Discovery
2003	American Experience	"Seabiscuit"	Kevin Lee	PBS
2003	American Masters	"Joni Mitchell: Woman of Heart and Mind"	Jeffrey Stern	PBS
2003	Before We Ruled the Earth		Michael Payne, Stephen P. Robinson, David Esparza, Nancy Nugent, Dean Grinsfelder, Laura Macias, Sean Rowe	Discovery
2003	Unchained Memories: Readings from the Slave Narratives		Ira Spiegel, Marlena Grzaslewicz	HBO
2004	Dinosaur Planet	"Pod's Travels" / "Alpha's Egg"	Michael Payne, Stephen P. Robinson, Nancy Nugent, David Esparza, Patrick Cusack, Lisa Varetakis, Dean Grinsfelder, Sean Rowe, Gregg Barbanell	Discovery
2004	American Masters	"Judy Garland: By Myself"	Margaret Crimmins, Greg Smith	PBS
2004	The Apprentice	"DNA, Heads and the Undead Kitty"	Derek Luff, Ryan Owens, Mark Jasper, Rick Livingstone	NBC
2004	Jockey		Lynne Feldman, Kate Davis	HBO
2004	Three Sisters: Searching for a Cure		John Bowen	HBO
2005	Pompeii: The Last Day		Simon Farmer	Discovery
2005	The Amazing Race	"We're Moving Up the Food Chain"	Matt Deitrich, Mike Bolanowski, Heeyeon Chang, Chris Dalzell, Evan Finn, Danny Flynn, Michael Friedman, Eric Goldfarb, Julian Gomez, Andrew Kozar, Paul C. Nielsen, Jacob Parsons, Jeff Runyan, E. Wilson	CBS
2005	Broadway: The American Musical	"Syncopated City"	Deborah Wallach, Branka Mrkic	PBS
2005	Star Wars: Empire of Dreams		David Comtois, Troy Bogert, Scott B. Morgan, Molly Shock	A&E
2005	Unforgivable Blackness: The Rise and Fall of Jack Johnson	"Part 1"	Sean Huff, Erik Ewers, Jacob Ribicoff	PBS
2006	Baghdad ER		Lila Yomtoob	HBO
2006	The Amazing Race	"Here Comes the Bedouin!"	Matt Deitrich, Mike Bolanowski, Evan Finn, Eric Goldfarb, Julian Gomez, Andrew Kozar, Paul C. Nielsen, Rick Livingstone	CBS
2006	American Experience	"Two Days in October"	Jack Levy, Daniel Colman, Vince Balunas, Jeff K. Brunello, Kim Roberts, Doug Madick	PBS
2006	American Masters	"No Direction Home: Bob Dylan"	Philip Stockton, Allan Zaleski, Fred Rosenberg, Jennifer L. Dunnington, Annette Kudrak	PBS
2006	Survivor	"Big Trek, Big Trouble, Big Surprise"	Ryan Owens, Mark Jasper, Vince Tennant, Matt Slivinski, Glen Frazier, Rick Livingstone, Michael Brake, Monique Reymond	CBS
2007	Planet Earth	"Pole to Pole"	Kate Hopkins	Discovery
2007	The Amazing Race	"I Know Phil, Little Ol' Gorgeous Thing"	Jon Bachmann, Eric Goldfarb, Julian Gomez, Andrew Kozar, Paul C. Nielsen, Jacob Parsons, Rick Livingstone	CBS
2007	American Masters	"Atlantic Records: The House That Ahmet Built"	Richard Fairbanks, Pamela Scott Arnold	PBS
2007	Ghosts of Abu Ghraib		Margaret Crimmins, Greg Smith	HBO
2007	When the Levees Broke: A Requiem in Four Acts		Fred Rosenberg, Allan Zaleski, Marko A. Costanzo, Marvin R. Morris	HBO
2008	The War	"When Things Get Tough"	Erik Ewers, Ryan Gifford, Mariusz Glabinski, Magdaline Volaitis, Ira Spiegel, Marlena Grzaslewicz, Jacob Ribicoff	PBS
2008	Alive Day Memories: Home from Iraq		Stuart Stanley, Philippe Desloovere	HBO
2008	The Amazing Race	"Honestly, They Have Witch Powers or Something"	Eric Goldfarb, Andrew Kozar, Paul C. Nielsen, Jacob Parsons, Steven J. Escobar, Julian Gomez, Rick Livingstone	CBS
2008	American Masters	"Les Paul: Chasing Sound"	John Paulson	PBS
2008	Autism: The Musical		Keith Rishkofski	HBO
2008	Life After People		Dave Philips, Coby Taitano, Corey Morgan, Stephen Parise, Ryan Young, Nozomu Furuya, Jack Crosby	History
2009	102 Minutes That Changed America		Seth Skundrick	History
2009	The Amazing Race	"Don't Let a Cheese Hit Me"	Eric Goldfarb, Julian Gomez, Andrew Kozar, Paul C. Nielsen, Jacob Parsons, Rick Livingstone	CBS
2009	China's Unnatural Disaster: The Tears of Sichuan Province		Paul Hsu, Branka Mrkic	HBO
2009	Glass: A Portrait of Philip in Twelve Parts (American Masters)		Stephen R. Smith, Peter D. Smith, Tom Heuzenroeder, Adrian Medhurst	PBS
2009	Roman Polanski: Wanted and Desired		D.D. Stenehjem	HBO

=== 2010s ===
Year	Program	Episode	Nominees	Network
2010	America: The Story of Us	"Division"	Phitz Hearne	History
2010	The Amazing Race	"I Think We're Fighting the Germans, Right?"	Eric Goldfarb, Julian Gomez, Andrew Kozar, Paul C. Nielsen, Jacob Parsons, Rich Remis, Jennifer Nelson, Mike Bolanowski, Rick Livingstone	CBS
2010	Life	"Challenges of Life"	Kate Hopkins	Discovery
2010	The National Parks: America's Best Idea	"The Scripture of Nature"	Erik Ewers, Craig Mellish, Ryan Gifford, Dave Mast, Jacob Ribicoff, Margaret Shepardson-Legere, Meagan Frappiea	PBS
2010	Teddy: In His Own Words		Neil Cedar	HBO
2011	Gettysburg		Charles Maynes, Zach Seivers, Brent Kiser	History
2011	The Amazing Race	"You Don't Get Paid Unless You Win"	Eric Goldfarb, Julian Gomez, Andrew Kozar, Paul C. Nielsen, Jacob Parsons, Rich Remis, Jennifer Nelson, Mike Bolanowski, Bryan Parker	CBS
2011	American Idol	"Auditions No. 2: New Orleans"	Matt Slivinski, Bryan Parker	Fox
2011	American Masters	"Jeff Bridges: The Dude Abides"	Deborah Wallach	PBS
2011	Baseball: The Tenth Inning	"Top of the Tenth"	Ira Spiegel, Mariusz Glabinski, Jacob Ribicoff, Dan Korintus, Marlena Grzaslewicz	PBS
2011	Whale Wars	"To the Ends of the Earth"	Bryan Parker	Animal Planet
2012	Frozen Planet	"Ends of the Earth"	Kate Hopkins, Tim Owens, Paul Fisher	Discovery Channel
2012	The Amazing Race	"Let Them Drink Their Haterade"	Eric Goldfarb, Julian Gomez, Andrew Kozar, Paul C. Nielsen, Jacob Parsons, Rich Remis, Jennifer Nelson, Mike Bolanowski, Bryan Parker, Graham Barclay	CBS
2012	George Harrison: Living in the Material World		Philip Stockton, Allan Zaleski, Jennifer L. Dunnington	HBO
2012	Paul Simon's Graceland Journey: Under African Skies		Eric Milano, Chris Davis	A&E
2012	Prohibition	"A Nation of Hypocrites"	Dan Korintus, Marlena Grzaslewicz, Ira Spiegel, Dave Mast, Erik Ewers, Jacob Ribicoff	PBS
2013	The Men Who Built America	"Bloody Battles"	Tim W. Kelly, Jonathan Soule	History
2013	The Amazing Race	"Be Safe and Don't Hit a Cow"	Eric Goldfarb, Julian Gomez, Andrew Kozar, Paul C. Nielsen, Jacob Parsons, Andy Castor, Jennifer Nelson, Mike Bolanowski, Bryan Parker, Graham Barclay	CBS
2013	Crossfire Hurricane		Cameron Frankley, Jon Michaels	HBO
2013	The Dust Bowl	"The Great Plow-Up"	Craig Mellish, Ryan Gifford, Dave Mast, Meagan Frappiea	PBS
2013	History of the Eagles		Philip Stockton, Ruy García, Annette Kudrak	Showtime
2013	Survivor	"Create a Little Chaos"	John Warrin, Paul Meyer, Michael Brake, Michael Dobbins, Todd Babiak, Brooke Lowrey	CBS
2014	Cosmos: A Spacetime Odyssey	"Standing Up in the Milky Way"	Christopher Harvengt, Richard S. Steele, Jeff Carson, Jason Tregoe Newman, Bob Costanza, Lisa Varetakis, Bill Bell, Tim Chilton, Jill Schachne	Fox
2014	The Amazing Race	"Part Like the Red Sea"	Eric Goldfarb, Julian Gomez, Andrew Kozar, Paul C. Nielsen, Jacob Parsons, Andy Castor, Jennifer Nelson, Ryan Leamy, Eric Beetner, Aaron Cross	CBS
2014	Anthony Bourdain: Parts Unknown	"Punjab"	Benny Mouthon, Hunter Gross	CNN
2014	Vice	"Terrorist University & Armageddon Now"	Sean Canada	HBO
2014	The World Wars	"Trial by Fire"	Tim W. Kelly, Jonathan Soule, Brian McAllister, John Kilgour, Mike Alfin	History
2015	Foo Fighters: Sonic Highways	"Seattle"	Justin Lebens	HBO
2015	Anthony Bourdain: Parts Unknown	"Madagascar"	Benny Mouthon	CNN
2015	Going Clear: Scientology and the Prison of Belief		Bill Chesley, David Ellinwood, Daniel Timmons	HBO
2015	The Jinx: The Life and Deaths of Robert Durst	"Chapter 2: Poor Little Rich Boy"	Duncan Clark, Matt Snedecor, Suzana Peric, John Carbonara	HBO
2015	Kurt Cobain: Montage of Heck		Cameron Frankley, Dan Kenyon, Jon Michaels	HBO
2016	Cartel Land		Tom Paul, Ryan Collison, Joanna Fang, Leslie Bloome, Mark Filip, Billy Orrico, Sean Garnhart	A&E
2016	Anthony Bourdain: Parts Unknown	"Okinawa"	Brian Bracken, Nick Brigden	CNN
2016	He Named Me Malala		Skip Lievsay, PK Hooker, Susan Dubek, Bill Bernstein	Nat Geo
2016	Making a Murderer	"Lack of Humanity"	Daniel Ward, Leslie Bloome	Netflix
2016	What Happened, Miss Simone?		Joshua L. Pearson, Dan Timmons	Netflix
2017
2017	The Beatles: Eight Days a Week — The Touring Years		Jon Michaels, Harrison Meyle, Dan Kenyon, Will Digby, Melissa Muik	Hulu
2017	Anthony Bourdain: Parts Unknown	"Hanoi"	Benny Mouthon	CNN
2017	Leah Remini: Scientology and the Aftermath	"Golden Era"	David Crocco, Rolando Nadal	A&E
2017	Planet Earth II	"Cities"	Kate Hopkins, Tim Owens	BBC America
2017	13th		Tim Boggs, Alex Lee, Julie Pierce, Lise Richardson	Netflix
2018
2018	Anthony Bourdain: Parts Unknown	"Seattle"	Brian Bracken, Nick Brigden	CNN
2018	Blue Planet II	"Coral Reefs"	Kate Hopkins, Tim Owens	BBC America
2018	The Defiant Ones	"Episode 1"	Jay Nierenberg, Todd Niesen, David Mann, Katrina Frederick, Del Spiva	HBO
2018	Jane		Warren Shaw, Joshua Paul Johnson, Odin Benitez, Peter Staubli, Will Digby, Suzana Peric, Tara Blume	Nat Geo
2018	The Vietnam War	"Episode 6: Things Fall Apart (January 1968-July 1968)"	Erik Ewers, Mariusz Glabinski, Dave Mast, Jacob Ribicoff, Ryan Gifford, Margaret Shepardson-Legere, Ira Spiegel, Matt Rigby, Marlena Grzaslewicz, Dan Korintus	PBS
2018	Wild Wild Country	"Part 1"	Brent Kiser, Jacob Flack, Elliot Thompson, Danielle Price, Timothy Preston	Netflix
2019
2019	Free Solo		Deborah Wallach, Filipe Messeder, Jim Schultz, Roland Vajs, Nuno Bento	Nat Geo
2019	Anthony Bourdain: Parts Unknown	"Far West Texas"	Benny Mouthon, Hunter Gross	CNN
2019	Fyre: The Greatest Party That Never Happened		Nathan Hasz, Tom Paul, Jeremy Bloom, Esther Regelson, Daniel Ward, Curtis Henderson	Netflix
2019	Leaving Neverland		Ross Millership, Poppy Kavanagh	HBO
2019	Our Planet	"Frozen Worlds"	Kate Hopkins, Tim Owens	Netflix

=== 2020s ===
Year	Program	Episode	Nominees	Network
2020
2020	Apollo 11		Eric Milano	CNN
2020	Beastie Boys Story		Martyn Zub, Paul Aulicino, Pernell Salinas	Apple TV+
2020	Cheer	"Daytona"	Logan Byers, Kaleb Klinger, Sean Gray	Netflix
2020	Laurel Canyon: A Place in Time		Jonathan Greber	Epix
2020	McMillion$	"Episode 1"	Ben Freer, Jordan Meltzer, Jody McVeigh-Schultz	HBO
2020	Tiger King: Murder, Mayhem and Madness	"Cult of Personality"	Ian Cymore, Rachel Wardell, Steve Griffen	Netflix
2021
2021	The Bee Gees: How Can You Mend a Broken Heart		Jonathan Greber, Pascal Garneau	HBO
2021	Allen v. Farrow	"Episode 2"	Dane A. Davis, Stephanie Flack, Jon Michaels, Ezra Dweck, Ellen Segal	HBO
2021	Billie Eilish: The World's a Little Blurry		Richard E. Yawn, Rob Getty, Steven Avila, Shawn Kennelly, Michael Brake, Melissa Kennelly, Vince Nicastro	Apple TV+
2021	David Attenborough: A Life on Our Planet		Tim Owens, Kate Hopkins, Tom Mercer, Gareth Cousins, Paul Ackerman	Netflix
2021	The Social Dilemma		Richard Gould, James Spencer, Andrea Gard	Netflix
2021	Tulsa Burning: The 1921 Race Massacre		John Moros	History
2022
2022	The Beatles: Get Back	"Part 3: Days 17-22"	Martin Kwok, Emile de la Rey, Matt Stutter, Michael Donaldson, Stephen Gallagher, Tane Upjohn-Beatson, Simon Riley	Disney+
2022	George Carlin's American Dream		Bobby Mackston, Miriam Cole, Matt Temple, Joseph Beshenkovsky	HBO Max
2022	Lucy and Desi		Anthony Vanchure, Daniel Pagan, Mike James Gallagher, Jason Tregoe Newman, Bryant Furhman	Prime Video
2022	McCartney 3,2,1	"The People We Loved Were Loving Us!"	Jonathan Greber, Leff Lefferts, Bjorn Ole Schroeder, E. Larry Oatfield, Kim Foscato	Hulu
2022	The Tinder Swindler		Maria Kelly, Chad Orororo, Nirupama Rajendran	Netflix
2023
2023	Moonage Daydream		John Warhurst, Nina Hartstone, Jens Rosenlund Petersen, Samir Foco, James Shirley, Elliott Koretz, Amy Felton, Louise Burton, Brett Morgen	HBO
2023	Love, Lizzo		Vanessa Flores, Jessie Brewer	HBO Max
2023	100 Foot Wave	"Chapter V: Lost at Sea"	Max Holland, Eric Di Stefano, Kevin Senzaki	HBO
2023	Still: A Michael J. Fox Movie		Michael Feuser, Rich Bologna, Wyatt Sprague, Heather Gross, Bill Bernstein	Apple TV+
2023	Welcome to Wrexham	"Do or Die"	Will Harp, Jon Schell, Shaun Cromwell	FX
2024
2024	Jim Henson Idea Man		Daniel Timmons, Jeremy S. Bloom, Ian Cymore, Ryan Rubin	Disney+
2024	The Greatest Night in Pop		Richard Gallagher	Netflix
2024	Planet Earth III	"Freshwater"	Jonny Crew, Tim Owens, Ellie Bowler, Harsha Thangirala, Paul Ackerman	BBC America
2024	Steve! (Martin) A Documentary in 2 Pieces		Bob Edwards, Kim B. Christensen, Joel Raabe	Apple TV+
2024	Welcome to Wrexham	"Goals"	Shaun Cromwell, William Harp, Jon Schell, Sean Gray	FX
2025
2025	Music by John Williams		Dmitri Makarov, Tim Farrell, Richard Gould, Ramiro Belgardt	Disney+
2025	Beatles '64		Philip Stockton, Allan Zaleski, John M. Davis	Disney+
2025	100 Foot Wave	"Chapter III: Cortes Bank"	Kevin Senzaki, Eric Di Stefano, Max Holland, Eli Akselrod, Mika Anami	HBO
2025	Pee-wee as Himself		Daniel Timmons, Ian Cymore, Ryan Billia, Jeremy S. Bloom, Kelly Rodriguez, Eric Caudieux, Jonathan Zalben	HBO
2025	SNL50: Beyond Saturday Night	"Season 11: The Weird Year"	William Harp, Sean Gray	Peacock
2026
2026	Ocean with David Attenborough		George Fry, Roy Noy, Jonathon Cawte, Chris Domaille	Nat Geo
2026	Billy Joel: And So It Goes		Gregg Swiatlowski, Tim Obzud, Shari Johanson, Debora Lilavois	HBO
2026	John Candy: I Like Me		Jonathan Greber, Christopher Lafaye	Prime Video
2026	Mel Brooks: The 99 Year Old Man!		Bobby Mackston, Miriam Cole Manselle, John Mackston, Matt Temple, Andres Locsey	HBO Max
2026	World War II with Tom Hanks	"The Beginning"	Luke Hatfield	History

== Programs with multiple nominations ==
10 nominations

- The Amazing Race

7 nominations

- American Masters

6 nominations

- Anthony Bourdain: Parts Unknown

2 nominations

- American Experience
- 100 Foot Wave
- Survivor
- Welcome to Wrexham
