= Primetime Emmy Award for Outstanding Music Composition for a Documentary/Nonfiction or Reality Program (Original Dramatic Score) =

List of award winners

- Country: United States
- Presented by: Academy of Television Arts & Sciences
- First award: 2019
- Currently held by: John Candy: I Like Me (2026)
- Website: emmys.com

This is a list of winners and nominees of the Primetime Emmy Award for Outstanding Music Composition for a Documentary/Nonfiction or Reality Program (Original Dramatic Score).

The category was created in 2019. Documentary programs previously competed for the Primetime Emmy Award for Outstanding Music Composition for a Limited Series, Movie, or Special.

== Winners and nominations ==
=== 2010s ===
Year	Program	Episode	Nominee(s)	Network
2019 (71st)
2019 (71st)	Free Solo		Marco Beltrami and Brandon Roberts	Nat Geo
2019 (71st)	Game of Thrones: The Last Watch		Hannah Peel	HBO
2019 (71st)	Hostile Planet	"Oceans"	Benjamin Wallfisch	Nat Geo
2019 (71st)	Love, Gilda		Miriam Cutler	CNN
2019 (71st)	Our Planet	"One Planet"	Steven Price	Netflix
2019 (71st)	RBG		Miriam Cutler	CNN

=== 2020s ===
Year	Program	Episode	Nominee(s)	Network
2020 (72nd)
2020 (72nd)	Why We Hate	"Tools & Tactics"	Laura Karpman	Discovery
2020 (72nd)	Becoming		Kamasi Washington	Netflix
2020 (72nd)	Home	"Maine"	Amanda Jones	Apple TV+
2020 (72nd)	McMillion$	"Episode 1"	Alex Kovacs and Pinar Toprak	HBO
2020 (72nd)	Tiger King: Murder, Mayhem and Madness	"Not Your Average Joe"	John Enroth, Albert Fox and Mark Mothersbaugh	Netflix
2021 (73rd)
2021 (73rd)	David Attenborough: A Life on Our Planet		Steven Price	Netflix
2021 (73rd)	Allen v. Farrow	"Episode 4"	Michael Abels	HBO
2021 (73rd)	American Masters	"Amy Tan: Unintended Memoir"	Kathryn Bostic	PBS
2021 (73rd)	The Social Dilemma		Mark Crawford	Netflix
2021 (73rd)	Tulsa Burning: The 1921 Race Massacre		Branford Marsalis	History
2022 (74th)
2022 (74th)	Lucy and Desi		David Schwartz	Prime Video
2022 (74th)	14 Peaks: Nothing Is Impossible		Nainita Desai	Netflix
2022 (74th)	Return to Space		Mychael Danna and Harry Gregson-Williams	Netflix
2022 (74th)	They Call Me Magic	"Earvin"	Terence Blanchard	Apple TV+
2022 (74th)	The Tinder Swindler		Jessica Jones	Netflix
2023 (75th)
2023 (75th)	Still: A Michael J. Fox Movie		John Powell	Apple TV+
2023 (75th)	Eva Longoria: Searching for Mexico	"Veracruz"	Tony Morales	CNN
2023 (75th)	Light & Magic	"Gang of Outsiders"	James Newton Howard	Disney+
2023 (75th)	Pamela, a Love Story		Blake Neely	Netflix
2023 (75th)	Prehistoric Planet	"Badlands"	Hans Zimmer, Anže Rozman and Kara Talve	Apple TV+
2024 (76th)
2024 (76th)	Jim Henson Idea Man		David Fleming	Disney+
2024 (76th)	Albert Brooks: Defending My Life		Marc Shaiman	HBO
2024 (76th)	Beckham	"Seeing Red"	Anže Rozman and Camilo Forero	Netflix
2024 (76th)	Planet Earth III	"Extremes"	Jacob Shea, Sara Barone and Hans Zimmer	BBC America
2024 (76th)	Rock Hudson: All That Heaven Allowed		Laura Karpman	HBO
2025 (77th)
2025 (77th)	Chef's Table: Legends	"José Andrés"	Duncan Thum and David Bertok	Netflix
2025 (77th)	The Americas	"The Andes"	Hans Zimmer, Anže Rozman and Kara Talve	NBC
2025 (77th)	Leonardo da Vinci		Caroline Shaw	PBS
2025 (77th)	Planet Earth: Asia	"Beneath the Waves"	Jacob Shea and Laurentia Editha	BBC America
2025 (77th)	Super/Man: The Christopher Reeve Story		Ilan Eshkeri	HBO
2026 (78th)
2026 (78th)	John Candy: I Like Me		Tyler Strickland	Prime Video
2026 (78th)	High Horse: The Black Cowboy	"F*ck Westerns"	Raphael Saadiq	Peacock
2026 (78th)	Kingdom	"Episode 2"	Segun Akinola	BBC America
2026 (78th)	Mel Brooks: The 99 Year Old Man!		Jeff Morrow	HBO Max
2026 (78th)	Ocean with David Attenborough		Steven Price	Nat Geo
2026 (78th)	Prehistoric Planet: Ice Age	"The Big Freeze"	Kara Talve, Anže Rozman and Hans Zimmer	Apple TV

== Multiple nominations ==
4 nominations

- Anže Rozman
- Hans Zimmer

3 nominations

- Steven Price
- Kara Talve

2 nominations

- Miriam Cutler
- Laura Karpman
- Jacob Shea
