= Mel Brooks: The 99 Year Old Man! =

2026 documentary series

- Promotional release poster
- Directed by: Judd Apatow; Michael Bonfiglio
- Produced by: Judd Apatow; Michael Bonfiglio; Kevin Salter; Wayne Federman; Olivia Rosenbloom
- Cinematography: Matt Bass; Matthew Chavez; Jonathan Furmanski
- Edited by: Joe Beshenkovsky
- Music by: Jeff Morrow
- Production companies: Apatow Productions; HBO Documentary Films
- Distributed by: HBO Max
- Release date: January 22, 2026
- Running time: 216 minutes
- Country: United States
- Language: English

Mel Brooks: The 99 Year Old Man! is a 2026 American two-part documentary film which explores the life and career of Mel Brooks, directed by Judd Apatow and Michael Bonfiglio.

It features the final on-screen interviews of David Lynch and Rob Reiner.

== Reception ==
=== Critical response ===
On the review aggregator website Rotten Tomatoes, 100% of 25 critics' reviews are positive, with an average rating of 8.1/10. The website's consensus reads: "Blessed with an enthralling raconteur as its subject, The 99 Year Old Man! is an affectionate and hilarious retrospective as well as a wistful reminder that even a long life well-lived has its fair share of heartbreak." Metacritic, which uses a weighted average, assigned the film a score of 84 out of 100, based on 11 critics, indicating "universal acclaim".

Tim Lowery of The A.V. Club gave the documentary a B, writing, "[T]he fact the guy's final message at the three-and-a-half-hour mark, after so much personal heartbreak and joy and so many career ups and downs have been chronicled, is essentially 'be kind to each other' speaks volumes—and can't help but make his legacy feel far bigger than comedy."

=== Accolades ===
Award	Category	Recipient(s)	Result	Ref.
Astra TV Awards	Best Documentary TV Movie	Mel Brooks: The 99 Year Old Man!	Nominated	
Humanitas Prize	Documentary (Docuseries, Single Episode)	Judd Apatow, Michael Bonfiglio, and Joe Beshenkovsky (for "Part Two")	Nominated	
Primetime Emmy Awards	Outstanding Documentary or Nonfiction Special	Judd Apatow, Michael Bonfiglio, Joe Beshenkovsky, Amanda Rohlke, Kevin Salter, James A. Smith, and Miranda Soto	Nominated	
Primetime Emmy Awards	Outstanding Directing for a Documentary/Nonfiction Program	Judd Apatow and Michael Bonfiglio	Nominated	
Primetime Emmy Awards	Outstanding Music Composition for a Documentary/Nonfiction or Reality Program (Original Dramatic Score)	Jeff Morrow	Nominated	
Primetime Emmy Awards	Outstanding Picture Editing for a Nonfiction Program	Joe Beshenkovsky	Nominated	
Primetime Emmy Awards	Outstanding Sound Editing for a Nonfiction or Reality Program	Andres Locsey, Bobby Mackston, John Mackston, Miriam Cole Manselle, and Matt Temple	Nominated	
Primetime Emmy Awards	Outstanding Sound Mixing for a Nonfiction Program	Brad Bergbom, Earl Martin, Dave McJunkin, Alenka Pavlin, Kevin Rosen-Quan, and Brian Tarlecki	Nominated	
