= Ocean with David Attenborough =

2025 documentary film

- Film poster
- Directed by: Toby Nowlan; Colin Butfield; Keith Scholey
- Produced by: Toby Nowlan; Keith Scholey
- Starring: David Attenborough
- Narrated by: David Attenborough
- Cinematography: Doug Anderson; Toby Strong
- Edited by: Philippa Edwards
- Music by: Steven Price
- Production companies: Silverback Films; Open Planet Studios; Altitude Film Entertainment; All3 Media International; Minderoo Pictures
- Distributed by: National Geographic Documentary Films; Altitude
- Release dates: 8 May 2025 (select cinemas); 7 June 2025 (streaming)
- Running time: 84 minutes
- Country: United Kingdom
- Language: English
- Budget: $5.1 million
- Box office: $4.2 million

Ocean with David Attenborough is a 2025 British documentary film which explores the importance of the Earth's oceans and the threats they face. It is narrated by David Attenborough. It was directed by Toby Nowlan, Colin Butfield, and Keith Scholey. The film premiered at Southbank Centre's Royal Festival Hall in London on 6 May, and in select cinemas on 8 May (coinciding with Attenborough’s 99th birthday), and on 7 June became available for streaming on National Geographic, Disney+, and Hulu.

Ocean was accompanied by a complementary book, Ocean: Earth's Last Wilderness, written by Attenborough and Butfield (2025, John Murray, ISBN 978-1399818506).

== Reception ==
On the review aggregator website Rotten Tomatoes, 100% of 23 critics' reviews are positive. Metacritic, which uses a weighted average, assigned the film a score of 93 out of 100, based on four critics, indicating "universal acclaim".

== Awards and nominations ==
Year	Award	Category	Nominee(s)	Result	Refs
2026	Primetime Emmy Awards	Outstanding Documentary or Nonfiction Special	Toby Nowlan, Janet Han Vissering, Tom McDonald, Colin Butfield and Keith Scholey	Nominated	
2026	Primetime Emmy Awards	Outstanding Cinematography for a Nonfiction Program	Doug Anderson and Toby Strong	Won	
2026	Primetime Emmy Awards	Outstanding Music Composition for a Documentary/Nonfiction or Reality Program (Original Dramatic Score)	Steven Price	Nominated	
2026	Primetime Emmy Awards	Outstanding Narrator	David Attenborough	Nominated	
2026	Primetime Emmy Awards	Outstanding Sound Editing for a Nonfiction or Reality Program	George Fry, Roy Noy, Jonathon Cawte and Chris Domaille	Won	
2026	Primetime Emmy Awards	Outstanding Sound Mixing for a Nonfiction Program	Graham Wild and Oliver Baldwin	Nominated	
