= Paris to Pittsburgh =

- Country of origin: United States
- Original language: English

Production
- Producers: Bloomberg Philanthropies; National Geographic; RadicalMedia

Original release
- Network: National Geographic
- Release: December 12, 2018

Paris to Pittsburgh is a 2018 television documentary film about climate change directed by National Geographic filmmaker Sidney Beaumont and documentarian Michael Bonfiglio and produced by Bloomberg Philanthropies, National Geographic and RadicalMedia. The film is narrated by Rachel Brosnahan.

The film was first broadcast on December 12, 2018, in the United States on National Geographic.

== Background ==
The title of the documentary refers to the phrase used by President Donald Trump on June 1, 2017, when he announced that he was pulling the United States out of the Paris Agreement. Trump said, "I was elected to represent the citizens of Pittsburgh, not Paris." In response, Bill Peduto, then-Mayor of Pittsburgh, wrote: "As the Mayor of Pittsburgh, I can assure you that we will follow the guidelines of the Paris Agreement for our people, our economy and future." (Note: According to the PennLive June 1, 2017 article, while Trump carried enough voters in some parts of Pennsylvania, especially the southwest corner, Trump actually lost the vote in the city of Pittsburgh itself.)

== Reviews ==
Jennifer Kite-Powell of Forbes called the documentary "a searing look at the effects of climate change by regular people who are dealing with its effects in their local towns."
