= Prehistoric Planet =

British-American nature documentary television series

- Genre: Nature documentary
- Narrated by: Sir David Attenborough (seasons 1–2); Tom Hiddleston (season 3)
- Theme music composer: Hans Zimmer; Andrew James Christie
- Composers: Hans Zimmer; Anže Rozman; Kara Talve
- Countries of origin: United States; United Kingdom
- Original language: English
- No. of seasons: 3
- No. of episodes: 15

Production
- Executive producers: Jon Favreau; Mike Gunton
- Cinematography: Jonathan Jones and others
- Running time: 35–46 minutes
- Production companies: BBC Studios Natural History Unit; Golem Creations

Original release
- Network: Apple TV
- Release: May 23, 2022 – May 26, 2023
- Network: Apple TV
- Release: November 26, 2025

Prehistoric Planet is a television series, created in the nature documentary style, about extinct prehistoric animals that premiered on Apple TV beginning May 23, 2022. The first two seasons (2022–23) are produced by the BBC Studios Natural History Unit, with Jon Favreau as showrunner, visual effects by The Moving Picture Company, and narration by natural historian Sir David Attenborough. These seasons depict dinosaurs and other prehistoric animals, recreated with computer-generated imagery, living around the globe in the Late Cretaceous period 66 million years ago (Maastrichtian), just before the non-avian dinosaurs' extinction. The show intends to simulate the behaviors of these species by speculating from modern palaeontological research. A third season titled Prehistoric Planet: Ice Age, narrated by Tom Hiddleston and focusing on Pleistocene megafauna, was released in 2025.

Hans Zimmer, Kara Talve, and Anže Rozman composed the soundtrack. Prehistoric Planet is the highest-profile dinosaur-focused documentary series produced by the BBC since Planet Dinosaur in 2011, and its nature documentary-styled format is similar to the highly successful Walking with Dinosaurs (1999). Prehistoric Planet received critical acclaim for its visual effects, depiction of dinosaurs, and Attenborough's narration.

== Production ==
According to palaeontologist and consultant Steve Brusatte, the series had been in development "a decade" prior to its trailer release. On May 8, 2019, it was first reported by Deadline that Apple had ordered a new documentary series by BBC Studios titled Prehistoric Planet, to be executively produced by Jon Favreau. An original score was composed by Kara Talve, Anže Rozman and Hans Zimmer.

The series uses up-to-date palaeontological research to depict its animals of the Cretaceous with scientific rigour; for example, feathered dinosaurs are featured in the series, such as juvenile Tyrannosaurus rex. Palaeozoologist Darren Naish was the lead consultant for the depictions of prehistoric life in the series. The storyboarding (using scripts and synopses by BBC NHU), concept art and creature designs were created by Jellyfish Pictures, while computer-generated imagery was developed by The Moving Picture Company and intended to be photorealistic, as with their previous productions The Jungle Book (2016) and The Lion King (2019).

After its release, the series consultants other than Darren Naish were revealed to be Steve Brusatte, Alexander Farnsworth, Kiersten Formoso, Michael Habib, Scott Hartman, John R. Hutchinson, Luke Muscutt, Peter Skelton, Robert Spicer, Paul Valdes and Mark Witton. David Krentz, the director of Dinosaur Revolution (2011) and character designer on Disney's Dinosaur (2000), was also revealed to have been involved in the creature development and design.

In March 2023, Apple renewed the series for a second season (Prehistoric Planet 2), which began airing on May 22, 2023. On July 29, 2025, a third season was announced, titled Prehistoric Planet: Ice Age. This series focuses on Pleistocene megafauna. Unlike previous seasons, it is narrated by Tom Hiddleston with computer-generated imagery handled by Framestore. It was released on November 26, 2025.

== Marketing ==
A first sneak peek was posted to the official Apple TV+ YouTube channel on April 2, 2022, along with a trailer, with a May 23 airdate set for the first episode. A ten-second teaser was released on April 19, 2022, followed by an official trailer the following day. A second trailer was released on May 19, 2022, in the lead up to the show's premiere.

The teaser of the second season was uploaded to the official Apple TV+ YouTube channel on April 18, 2023. The official trailer was released on May 2, 2023.

A first look video clip was released for Prehistoric Planet: Ice Age on October 15, 2025. An official trailer was released on November 6, 2025.

== Episodes ==
Season	Episodes	Originally released		
Season	Episodes	First released	Last released	Network
1	5	May 23, 2022	May 27, 2022	Apple TV+
2	5	May 22, 2023	May 26, 2023	Apple TV+
3	5	November 26, 2025		Apple TV

=== Prehistoric Planet (2022) ===
No. overall	No. in season	Title	Directed by	Written by	Original release date
1	1	"Coasts"	Adam Valdez	Paul D. Stewart	May 23, 2022
A father Tyrannosaurus and his offspring swim across a perilous seaway to feed on a dead protostegid turtle. Baby Alcione take their first flight through a gauntlet of predatory Barbaridactylus, while other species of pterosaurs congregate on the shores below. Dozens of Tuarangisaurus travel to a bay in search of gastroliths. An old male Mosasaurus is cleaned by reef denizens and defends his territory from a younger rival. Scaphitid ammonites perform an elaborate mating display. A pregnant Tuarangisaurus is targeted by a Kaikaifilu and protected by her pod, after which she gives birth to a healthy baby.
2	2	"Deserts"	Andrew R. Jones, Adam Valdez	Dom Walter	May 24, 2022
Several male Dreadnoughtus clash for the right to mate. A pair of Velociraptor hunt for lizards among a group of sleeping Tarbosaurus. A Mononykus forages for termites and investigates new food options after a rainstorm. Several species of Asian dinosaurs congregate around a watering hole. Male Barbaridactylus compete for females atop a remote plateau. A herd of Secernosaurus brave the harsh gypsum dunes in search of nourishment.
3	3	"Freshwater"	Andrew R. Jones	Paul Thompson	May 25, 2022
A trio of Velociraptor hunt juvenile pterosaurs near a waterfall. An old, battle-scarred male Tyrannosaurus nurses his wounds and encounters a female. A Deinocheirus seeks relief from biting flies by scratching his body on a tree. A female Quetzalcoatlus builds and guards her nest. A mother Masiakasaurus and her family hunt crabs but one of her hatchlings is ambushed by a Beelzebufo. Some elasmosaurs enter an estuary in search of fish.
4	4	"Ice Worlds"	Adam Valdez	Simon Bell	May 26, 2022
A pack of dromaeosaurs stalks a herd of hadrosaurs as they cross a freezing river. Male Ornithomimus raid rivals' nests to bolster their own. A herd of Olorotitan raise their offspring on fertile volcanic fields but contend with biting mosquitoes. A troodontid flushes out prey by spreading a forest fire. A juvenile Antarctopelta scours the forest for a new winter den. A Pachyrhinosaurus herd stands off against a pack of Nanuqsaurus.
5	5	"Forests"	Andrew R. Jones, Adam Valdez	Matthew Wright	May 27, 2022
A herd of Austroposeidon level trees in search of fresh foliage. A herd of Triceratops journey through a cave to find an underground clay lick. A male Carnotaurus sets the stage for an elaborate mating display. A Qianzhousaurus hunts a flock of Corythoraptor in an autumn storm. A family of Edmontosaurus evade a forest fire, while an Atrociraptor and an ankylosaur reap their rewards. A group of juvenile Therizinosaurus attempt to climb a tree and feed on honey from a beehive. A Hatzegopteryx is shown preying on juvenile Zalmoxes and he then flies off into the sunset.

=== Prehistoric Planet 2 (2023) ===
No. overall	No. in season	Title	Directed by	Written by	Original release date
6	1	"Islands"	Andrew R. Jones	Paul D. Stewart	May 22, 2023
After a tropical storm, two Zalmoxes find themselves in a rafting event. Several Hatzegopteryx ambush a herd of Tethyshadros. A female Majungasaurus hunts Simosuchus. Nearby, a mother Adalatherium raises her offspring in a burrow, hoping to keep them safe from predators like Masiakasaurus and Madtsoia. A pack of Imperobator pursue a Morrosaurus onto a frozen lake. A male Hatzegopteryx attempts to attract a mate.
7	2	"Badlands"	Andrew R. Jones, Adam Valdez	Nick Lyon and Dom Walter	May 23, 2023
Several female Isisaurus traverse the Deccan Traps to reach their nesting site. A mixed herd of Nemegtosaurus and Prenocephale navigate a maze of canyons, but are ambushed by a pack of Velociraptor and a trio of Tarbosaurus. A colony of male Corythoraptor protect their eggs from the scorching sun by day and a female Kuru kulla at night, who has offspring of her own. A pair of juvenile Tarchia locate a desert oasis, but contend with an adult. Several Isisaurus hatchlings fall prey to Rajasaurus in an attempt to reach their ancestral home.
8	3	"Swamps"	Krzysztof Szczepanski	Alec Ginns	May 24, 2023
Pterosaur hatchlings take flight to leave their island sanctuary, but are targeted by Shamosuchus. Several Austroraptor hunt garfish and contend with the best fishing spots. A male Beelzebufo tries to attract a mate, but his endeavour is interrupted by a herd of Rapetosaurus. A male Pachycephalosaurus must put an upstart youngster in his place. Two Tyrannosaurus brothers hunt an Edmontosaurus under the cover of darkness.
9	4	"Oceans"	Adam Valdez	Amber Cherry Eames	May 25, 2023
A female Phosphorosaurus hunts lanternfish under the ocean's moonlit surface. A flock of Hesperornis hunt for fish until they themselves are hunted by Xiphactinus. Nostoceras hatchlings are at the mercy of tides and juvenile Pyroraptors. A Mosasaurus hunts a group of Tuarangisaurus. The young Nostoceras that survived find themselves among Baculites and Diplomoceras in their new seagrass meadow home. A pod of Morturneria sift the muddy seabed of Antarctica in search of food.
10	5	"North America"	Andrew R. Jones	Paul Thompson	May 26, 2023
A Tyrannosaurus and two Quetzalcoatlus fight over an Alamosaurus carcass. A shoal of Sphenodiscus are ambushed by a Globidens, intent on surplus killing them. At an evaporating lake, juvenile Pectinodon hunt flies while their father hunts Styginetta. Male Triceratops fight and display for the right to mate. A female Nanuqsaurus hunts Ornithomimus to feed herself and her offspring.

=== Prehistoric Planet: Ice Age (2025) ===
No. overall	No. in season	Title	Directed by	Written by	Original release date
11	1	"The Big Freeze"	Leah Arnold and Alec Ginns	Matthew Thompson and Michael Gunton	November 26, 2025
A mother woolly mammoth goes into labor during a blizzard with the herd protecting her and her newborn calf. A pair of cave lions enter a cave to hunt cave bear cubs. Their hunt fails as the cubs spot them, which leads to the adult bears chasing one lion away and fatally injuring the other, with its carcass becoming food for cave hyenas. A family of ground sloths awakens from their den and searches for food in a thick layer of snow. A herd of woolly rhinoceros must fend off a pack of scimitar-toothed cats with an old female nearly separated from the crash. A female juvenile Smilodon attempts to hunt Macrauchenia with her milk teeth still in place while encountering a male.
12	2	"New Lands"	Paul Thompson	Matthew Thompson and Michael Gunton	November 26, 2025
Following the Great American Interchange, a male giant short-faced bear must find a new way to acquire food, stealing from a pack of wild dogs. A squirrel trails a giant ground sloth in search of food. A giant armadillo and her baby journey across new lands in search of water, confronting Columbian mammoths. A dwarf Stegodon calf wanders off and gets stuck in tree roots, attracting a trio of giant storks which attempt to hunt it. Two terror bird brothers seek to outwit a Smilodon.
13	3	"Desert Lands"	Simon Bell	Matthew Thompson and Michael Gunton	November 26, 2025
Water is locked up at the poles, leading to the expansion of deserts. A ground sloth carries her baby up a mile-high cliff in search of fresh browse. A matriarch Diprotodon succumbs to drought, forcing her herd to choose an uneasy new direction led by her daughter. Marsupial lions fail to catch giant short-faced kangaroos on foot. A male giant moa performs a humble mating ritual to please a much larger female. A pair of young carnivorous kangaroos harass a hatchling megalania, until an adult arrives to turn the tables. Back on the cliff face, teratorns imperil the ground sloths' trip back down to shelter. To feed her starving family, one of the marsupial lions adopts a new hunting strategy by attacking a juvenile short-faced kangaroo from a tree.
14	4	"Grasslands"	Andrew R. Jones and James Shelton	Matthew Thompson and Michael Gunton	November 26, 2025
Grass is upending ecosystems around the world. An unusual type of rhino uses a thermal mud pool to ward off ticks and ravens. A pack of African scimitar-toothed cats successfully takes down a zebra, only to be chased off their kill by a family of giant otters. As his forest habitat diminishes, a lone male Gigantopithecus uses his ingenuity to acquire food, but has difficulty finding a mate. A giant glyptodont does manage to track down a potential mate, but he must first battle an experienced rival. A woolly mammoth herd braves a massive dust storm in search of water, while the calf experiences the storm's hostility.
15	5	"The Big Melt"	Andrew R. Jones and Katrina Steele	Matthew Thompson and Michael Gunton	November 26, 2025
The ice age is nearing its end, and the Earth is becoming warmer and wetter. A pack of scimitar-toothed cats makes a desperate attack on a woolly mammoth herd. The falling tide beaches a Steller's sea cow and attracts the attention of a short-faced bear. A Smilodon and her cubs are mobbed by a pack of dire wolves while scavenging a Columbian mammoth carcass trapped in a tar pit. A male Megaloceros narrowly evades a pack of cave hyenas as he sheds his antlers. Elephant birds migrate to new wetlands, leaving stragglers to fend for themselves against a giant fossa. The hyenas continue to pursue the Megaloceros through a forest. The scimitar-tooths finally achieve a meal, as humans watch from afar.

== Reception ==
The review aggregator website Rotten Tomatoes reported a 100% approval rating with an average rating of 8.4/10, based on 31 reviews for the first season. The website's critics consensus reads, "Marrying state of the art visual effects with equally immersive narration by David Attenborough, Prehistoric Planet wondrously brings viewers back to the age of dinosaurs." The second season has an approval rating of 83% with an average rating of 7/10, based on six reviews. On Metacritic, the series has a weighted average score of 85 out of 100, based on 8 reviews, indicating "universal acclaim".

=== Accolades ===
Year	Award	Category	Nominee(s)	Result	Ref.
2022	Hollywood Critics Association TV Awards	Best Streaming Docuseries or Non-Fiction Series	Prehistoric Planet	Nominated	
2022	Television Critics Association Awards	Outstanding Achievement in News and Information	Prehistoric Planet	Nominated	
2022	Cinema Eye Honours	Outstanding Anthology Series	Prehistoric Planet	Nominated	
2022	Hollywood Music in Media Awards	Original Song/Score — Documentary Series - TV/Digital	Anze Rozman, Kara Talve, Hans Zimmer	Won	
2022	Televisual Bulldog Awards	Best VFX	Prehistoric Planet	Won	
2022	Broadcast Tech Innovation Awards	Best VFX Project	MPC	Won	
2023	Annie Awards	Best Animated Special Production	Prehistoric Planet	Nominated	
2023	Annie Awards	Outstanding Achievement for Animated Effects in an Animated Television/Broadcast Production	"Coasts"	Nominated	
2023	Visual Effects Society Awards	Outstanding Visual Effects in a Photoreal Episode	"Ice Worlds" – Lindsay McFarlane, Fay Hancocks, Elliot Newman, Kirstin Hall	Nominated	
2023	Visual Effects Society Awards	Outstanding Virtual Cinematography in a CG Project	Daniel Fotheringham, Krzysztof Szczepanski, Wei-Chuan Hsu, Claire Hill	Nominated	
2023	Critics' Choice Real TV Awards	Best Animal/Nature Show	Prehistoric Planet	Nominated	
2024	Primetime Creative Arts Emmy Awards	Outstanding Music Composition for a Documentary Series or Special (Original Dramatic Score)	Hans Zimmer, Anže Rozman, Kara Talve (for "Badlands")	Nominated	
2024	Astra Creative Arts TV Awards	Best Streaming Nonfiction Series	Prehistoric Planet	Nominated	
2026	Annie Awards	Outstanding Achievement for Animated Effects in an Animated Television/Broadcast	Edward Ferrysienanda, Kevin Christensen, Guy Shuleman , Benedikt Roettger, Kevin Tarpinian (for "The Big Freeze")	Won	
2026	Annie Awards	Outstanding Achievement for Character Animation in a Live Action Production	Adrien Annesley, Alvise Avati, Riyad Chalakkara, Daniel Mizuguchi, Liam Russell	Nominated	
2026	Visual Effects Society Awards	Outstanding Visual Effects in a Photoreal Episode	Russell Dodgson, Tracey Gibbons, Francois Dumoulin, Gavin McKenzie (For "Ice Age; The Big Freeze")	Won	
2026	Visual Effects Society Awards	Outstanding Character in an Episodic, Commercial, Game Cinematic, or Real-Time Project	Alvise Avati, Marc-André Coulombe, Youen Leclerc, Andrea De Martis (For "Ice Age; Female Smilodon")	Nominated	
2026	Visual Effects Society Awards	Outstanding Effects Simulations in an Episode, Commercial, Game Cinematic or Real-Time Project	Edward Ferrysienanda, Kevin Christensen, Guy Schuleman, Kevin Tarpinian (For "Ice Age; The Big Freeze")	Won	
2026	Visual Effects Society Awards	Outstanding Compositing and Lighting in an Episode	Puff Pisanwalerd, Jean-Baptiste Noyau, Marion Nove-Josserand, Sue Nelson (For "Ice Age\")	Nominated	
2026	Primetime Creative Arts Emmy Awards	Outstanding Music Composition for a Documentary/Nonfiction or Reality Program (Original Dramatic Score)	Kara Talve, Anže Rozman, Hans Zimmer (for "The Big Freeze")	Nominated	
2026	Primetime Creative Arts Emmy Awards	Outstanding Special Visual Effects in a Season or a Movie	Russell Dodgson, Andrew R. Jones, Rupert Smith, Tracey Gibbons, Benjamin Loch, Francois Dumoulin, Romain Rico, Gavin McKenzie, Brian Fisher, Alvise Avati, Adrien Annesley, Liam Russell	Nominated	

== Other media ==
=== VR spinoffs ===
In early 2024, Prehistoric Planet was the basis for several digital presentations viewable through the Apple Vision Pro headset. The first two products were flagship items for the official release of the headset on February 2, 2024: Pterosaur Beach (a subscription-based virtual reality short film focusing on a colony of Tethydraco), and Encounter Dinosaurs, (a free mixed reality app focusing on an encounter between Isisaurus hatchlings and Rajasaurus). Pterosaur Beach was treated as the first "episode" of the VR series Prehistoric Planet Immersive. It was followed on April 19 by Triceratops Forest, focusing on a family of Triceratops.

=== Prehistoric Planet: Discovering Dinosaurs ===
Starting in 2025, several specialty theatres and immersive galleries have hosted Prehistoric Planet: Discovering Dinosaurs. This program is a 360-degree video show assembled from clips of the first two seasons alongside full-scale graphics.

Prehistoric Planet: Discovering Dinosaurs shows
Date	Venue	Location
July 9, 2025 – September 1, 2026	Lightroom	London, United Kingdom
December 10, 2025 – June 28, 2026	Atelier des Lumières	Paris, France
December 13, 2025 – March 22, 2026	Port des Lumieres	Hamburg, Germany
February 12, 2026 – September 17, 2026	Fabrique des Lumières	Amsterdam, Netherlands
March 20, 2026 – June 29, 2026	Phoenix des Lumières	Dortmund, Germany
October 10, 2026 – January 10, 2027	Elverket	Stockholm, Sweden
December 8, 2026 – January 7, 2027	Aviva Studios	Manchester, United Kingdom
