= George Carlin's American Dream =

- Genre: Documentary
- Directed by: Judd Apatow; Michael Bonfiglio
- Starring: George Carlin; Patrick Carlin Jr. Kelly Carlin
- Music by: Jeff Morrow
- No. of episodes: 2

Production
- Executive producers: Teddy Leifer; Judd Apatow; Michael Bonfiglio; Jerry Hamza; Kelly Carlin; Nancy Abraham; Lisa Heller
- Producer: Wayne Federman
- Animator: Stefan Nadelman
- Editor: Joe Beshenkovsky
- Production companies: Rise Films; Apatow Productions

Original release
- Network: HBO
- Release: May 20, 2022

George Carlin's American Dream is a 2022 two-part documentary film about comedian George Carlin directed by Judd Apatow and Michael Bonfiglio.

== Summary ==
=== Part 1 ===
At the dawn of the 1960s comedy scene, a clean-cut Carlin works the mainstream variety-show circuit but soon realizes that he was meant for something edgier. He trades his suit and tie for bluejeans, and finds that his eloquence and sometimes brutal candor resonate with counterculture audiences. Propelled by sales of his four gold comedy records released on Flip Wilson's Little David label (Little David Records), appearances on talk shows, and frequent touring, Carlin becomes a major comedic force of the 1970s.

=== Part 2 ===
In the 1980s, Carlin faces major challenges: His audiences are shrinking, some critics deem him passé, and his family is suffering because of his cocaine use and his wife's alcoholism. He approaches his material with a new vigor, and fills comedy clubs and large venues with his insightful and increasingly critical observations about politics, life, and human behavior.

== Production ==
On August 10, 2020, HBO announced that a documentary about George Carlin was in development with Judd Apatow and his longtime collaborator Michael Bongfiglio. They were also working with editor Joe Beshenkovsky, who worked with Apatow on the documentary The Zen Diaries of Garry Shandling. The film is dedicated in the memory of Patrick Carlin Jr., George's elder brother, who died a month before the film was released.

== Episodes ==
No.	Title	Directed by	Original release date	Prod. code
1	"Part 1"	Judd Apatow & Michael Bonfiglio	May 20, 2022	101
The beginning of Carlin's legendary career as one of the premier stand up comedians of his time!
2	"Part 2"	Judd Apatow & Michael Bonfiglio	May 21, 2022	102
The conclusion of Carlin's legendary career as one of the premier stand up comedians of his time!

== Notable interviewees ==
- George Carlin (archival footage)
- Brenda Carlin, Carlin's first wife (archival footage)
- Sally Wade, Carlin's second wife
- Kelly Carlin, Carlin's daughter
- Patrick Carlin Jr., Carlin's elder brother
- Kliph Nesteroff, author and comedy historian
- Jerry Hamza, Carlin's manager from 1980 until his death
- Bette Midler
- Rocco Urbisci, executive producer of Carlin's HBO specials from Playin' with Your Head onward
- Alex Winter, co-star of the Bill & Ted films
- Tony Orlando, host of the variety show Tony Orlando and Dawn
- Kevin Smith, director of Dogma, Jay and Silent Bob Strike Back, and Jersey Girl, all of which featured Carlin
- Comedians who have cited Carlin as an inspiration, including:
  - Bill Burr
  - Stephen Colbert
  - Sam Jay
  - Chris Rock
  - Patton Oswalt
  - W. Kamau Bell
  - Jerry Seinfeld
  - Hasan Minhaj
  - Paul Reiser
  - Jon Stewart
  - Steven Wright

== Awards and nominations ==
Year	Award	Category	Nominee(s)	Result	Ref.
2022	Peabody Awards	Entertainment	George Carlin's American Dream	Nominated	
2022	Hollywood Critics Association TV Awards	Best Streaming Docuseries or Non-Fiction Series	George Carlin's American Dream	Nominated	
2022	Primetime Emmy Awards	Outstanding Documentary or Nonfiction Special	Teddy Leifer, Judd Apatow, Michael Bonfiglio, Kelly Carlin, Joseph Beshenkovsky, Amanda Glaze, and Wayne Federman	Won	
2022	Primetime Emmy Awards	Outstanding Directing for a Documentary/Nonfiction Program	Judd Apatow and Michael Bonfiglio	Nominated	
2022	Primetime Emmy Awards	Outstanding Picture Editing for a Nonfiction Program	Joseph Beshenkovsky	Nominated	
2022	Primetime Emmy Awards	Outstanding Sound Editing for a Nonfiction or Reality Program (Single or Multi-Camera)	Bobby Mackston, Matt Temple, and Joseph Beshenkovsky	Nominated	
2022	Primetime Emmy Awards	Outstanding Sound Mixing for a Nonfiction or Reality Program (Single or Multi-Camera)	Earl Martin, Jason Gaya, Brad Bergbom, and Kevin Rosen Quan	Nominated	
2022	Television Critics Association Awards	Outstanding Achievement in News and Information	George Carlin's American Dream	Nominated	
2022	Critics' Choice Documentary Awards	Best Biographical Documentary	George Carlin's American Dream	Nominated	
2022	Critics' Choice Documentary Awards	Best Director	Judd Apatow and Michael Bonfiglio	Nominated	
2022	Critics' Choice Documentary Awards	Best Editing	Joe Beshenkovsky	Nominated	
2022	Cinema Eye Honours	Outstanding Broadcast Film	George Carlin's American Dream	Nominated	
2023	Cinema Audio Society Awards	Outstanding Achievement in Sound Mixing for Television Non Fiction, Variety or Music – Series or Specials	Paul Graff, Earl Martin, Jason Gaya (for "Part 1")	Nominated	
2023	Golden Reel Awards	Outstanding Achievement in Sound Editing – Non-Theatrical Documentary	Bobby Mackston, Matt Temple, Joseph Beshenkovsky, Miriam Cole	Nominated	
2023	Producers Guild of America Awards	Best Non-Fiction Television	George Carlin's American Dream	Nominated	
