= The Zen Diaries of Garry Shandling =

2018 documentary by Judd Apatow

- Directed by: Judd Apatow
- Starring: James L. Brooks; Jim Carrey; Sacha Baron Cohen; Dave Coulier; Jon Favreau; Jay Leno; Kevin Nealon; Conan O'Brien; Bob Saget; Jerry Seinfeld; Sarah Silverman; David Duchovny
- Narrated by: Michael Cera
- Music by: Mike Andrews
- Country of origin: United States
- Original language: English

Production
- Producers: Judd Apatow; Sheila Nevins; Joe Beshenkovsky; Mike Bonfiglio; Wayne Federman; Sam Fishell; Amanda Glaze; Christopher Wilcha
- Cinematography: Matt Bass; Jonathan Furmanski
- Editor: Joe Beshenkovsky
- Running time: 270 minutes
- Production companies: Apatow Productions; RadicalMedia

Original release
- Network: HBO
- Release: March 26 – March 27, 2018

The Zen Diaries of Garry Shandling is an American documentary miniseries that premiered on HBO in two parts on March 26 and 27, 2018. Directed and produced by Judd Apatow, the film explores the life and legacy of comedian Garry Shandling.

== Premise ==
The Zen Diaries of Garry Shandling features "interviews from nearly four dozen friends, family and colleagues; four decades’ worth of television appearances; and a lifetime of personal journals, private letters and home audio and video footage."

== Persons featured ==
The documentary features the voice of actor Michael Cera reading various excerpts from Shandling's diaries and includes interviews with:

- Peter Berg
- James L. Brooks
- Jim Carrey
- Sacha Baron Cohen
- Dave Coulier
- David Duchovny
- Linda Doucett
- Jon Favreau
- Maya Forbes
- Al Jean
- Jay Leno
- Kevin Nealon
- Conan O'Brien
- Mike Reiss
- Bob Saget
- Jerry Seinfeld
- Sarah Silverman
- Gavin de Becker
- Brad Grey (archived footage)
- Adam Sandler (archive footage)
- Merrill Markoe
- Jeffrey Tambor
- Peter Tolan
- Paul Willson
- Alan Zweibel

== Production ==
On February 6, 2017, it was reported that Judd Apatow was developing a documentary on his mentor and friend Garry Shandling. A day later, Apatow made a public plea, via his official Twitter account, for anyone with photographs, videos, or information about Shandling to reach out to him.

On January 11, 2018, it was announced at the annual Television Critics Association's winter press tour that cable network HBO had acquired the documentary and planned to premiere it in two parts on March 26 and 27, 2018.

== Release ==
=== Marketing ===
On February 21, 2018, HBO released the first trailer for the film. A week later, the official poster was released as well.

=== Premiere ===
On March 14, 2018, the series held its official premiere at Avalon Hollywood in Los Angeles, California. The event was attended by various celebrities including Bob Saget, Kevin Nealon, Vanessa Bayer, Kathy Griffin and Regis Philbin.

== Reception ==
=== Critical response ===
The Zen Diaries of Garry Shandling has been met with a positive response from critics. On the review aggregation website Rotten Tomatoes, the film holds a 93% approval rating with an average rating of 8.4 out of 10, based on 15 reviews. Metacritic, which uses a weighted average, assigned the season a score of 90 out of 100 based on 9 critics, indicating "universal acclaim".

In a positive review, Newsday's Verne Gay gave the film four out of four stars and said, "Diaries is for Shandling fans, certainly, but it’s especially for any kid who might want to become a comic, or write for TV or get into this industry. Zen Diaries is a nearly five-hour-long master’s degree in “the business,” and also a sober, clear-eyed view of the risks as much as the rewards." His summation of the film reads, "Brilliant portrait of an iconic comic, but an especially moving and human one, too." Offering similar praise, Steve Greene of IndieWire gave the film a grade of "A−" and said, "As a tribute, a eulogy, and an appreciation, The Zen Diaries is a even-handed look at someone who sought to bring meaningful change into other people’s lives as he searched for that same sense of fulfillment himself. Even if the film didn’t actually include footage from a ceremony remembering and celebrating Shandling’s life, you’d feel like you were already part of one." In another enthusiastic review, The Hollywood Reporter's Daniel Fienberg said, "Presented over two nights, but easy to digest in a single sitting, Zen Diaries is a worthwhile account of Shandling's career and evolving philosophy, an insightful exploration of stand-up comedy and the comedic voice, and a sad contemplation and reckoning from those Shandling left behind and those grappling with his legacy." In a one sentence "bottom line" abridgment of his review he writes that the film is, "Essential for Shandling fans, a superb introduction for neophytes."

=== Ratings ===
Upon their premiere, part one of the documentary was viewed by 268,000 people and part two was viewed by 286,000 people.

=== Awards and nominations ===
Award	Category	Nominee(s)	Result	Ref.
Primetime Emmy Awards	Outstanding Documentary or Nonfiction Special	The Zen Diaries of Garry Shandling	Won	
Primetime Emmy Awards	Outstanding Directing for a Documentary/Nonfiction Program	Judd Apatow	Nominated	
Primetime Emmy Awards	Outstanding Picture Editing for a Nonfiction Program	Joe Beshenkovsky	Nominated	
American Cinema Editors Eddie Awards	Best Edited Documentary (Non-Theatrical)	Joe Beshenkovsky	Nominated	
MPSE Golden Reel Awards	Non-Theatrical Documentary	—N/a	Nominated	

== See also ==
- List of HBO Films films
