= Joe Beshenkovsky =

- Occupation: Documentary film editor
- Notable work: Kurt Cobain: Montage of Heck

Joe Beshenkovsky, ACE is an American documentary film editor. His credits include Kurt Cobain: Montage of Heck (2015), Jane (2017), The Zen Diaries of Garry Shandling (2018), George Carlin's American Dream (2022), Flipside (2023), and Mel Brooks: The 99 Year Old Man! (2026). With co-director James A. Smith, he directed the documentary Mata Hari (2025), which premiered at the 82nd Venice International Film Festival and won the Venezia Classici Award for Best Documentary on Cinema. He has won three Primetime Emmy Awards. He is a founder of the documentary production and editorial company Deep Cut.
