= Timothy Hanson =

American visual effects supervisor

Timothy Hanson is an American visual effects supervisor, who works at Pixomondo in Los Angeles, California, best known for his work as a CG supervisor for Avengers: Age of Ultron, The Walking Dead, and Fear the Walking Dead. He has previously worked for studios like Bad Robot, MPC, Mirada, The Mill, Method Studios, and Google. Hanson's work has also been featured in 3D Artist Magazine.

Hanson was awarded a Northern California Area Emmy Award for Outstanding Achievement in Graphic Arts and Animation - (Program) for 2008–2009 by The National Academy of Arts & Sciences. He has been nominated 4 times for Outstanding Achievement in Graphic Arts and Animation by The National Academy of Arts & Sciences.
