= Michael Bonfiglio =

Michael Bonfiglio is an American film director and producer.

== Filmography ==
=== Director ===
- Summit on the Summit (2010)
- Visionaries: The Creative Mind (2011 5-episode TV series)
- Oprah's Master Class (2012-2018 TV series, directed 27 of 50 episodes)
- Oprah's Master Class: Special Edition (2012)
- Iconoclasts S06E02 "Judd Apatow & Lena Dunham" & S06E03 "Seth McFarlane & Norah Jones" (2012)
- 30 for 30 S02e06 "You Don't Know Bo" (2012)
- Nine Days and Nights of Ed Sheeran (2014)
- Oprah's Master Class: Civil Rights Special (2015)
- Oprah's Master Class: Belief Special (2015)
- Oprah Goes to Broadway: The Color Purple (2015)
- 30 for 30 S03e15 "Doc & Darryl" (2016)
- May It Last: A Portrait of The Avett Brothers (2017)
- From the Ashes (2017)
- Jerry Before Seinfeld (2017)
- My Next Guest Needs No Introduction with David Letterman (2018-2022 TV series)
- Paris to Pittsburgh (2018)
- Gary Gulman: The Great Depresh (2019)
- Patrice O'Neal: Killing Is Easy (2021)
- Who Are You, Charlie Brown? (2021)
- Ricky Velez: Here's Everything (2021)
- George Carlin's American Dream (2022)
- Bob and Don: A Love Story (2023 short)
- Mel Brooks: The 99 Year Old Man! (2026)

=== Producer ===
- Paris to Pittsburgh (2018)
- The Zen Diaries of Garry Shandling (2018)
- Ricky Velez: Here's Everything (2021)
- George Carlin's American Dream (2022)
- Bob and Don: A Love Story (2023 short)
- Gary Gulman: Born on 3rd Base (2023)
- The New Yorker at 100 (2025)
- Mel Brooks: The 99 Year Old Man! (2026)
