= Kingdom (2025 TV series) =

- Genre: Nature documentary
- Narrated by: David Attenborough
- Country of origin: United Kingdom
- Original language: English
- No. of episodes: 6

Production
- Production location: Zambia
- Production company: BBC Natural History Unit

Original release
- Release: 9 November – 14 December 2025

Kingdom is a 2025 BBC nature documentary about families of four different species of animals, leopards, hyenas, African wild dogs and lions, living in Zambia. It was narrated by David Attenborough.
