= Matt Temple (sound designer) =

American sound effects editor and sound designer

- Education: Berklee College of Music
- Occupations: Sound effects editor; sound designer
- Known for: Better Call Saul, Ozark, Fargo

Matt Temple is an American sound effects editor and sound designer for film and television, noted for work on the series Better Call Saul, Ozark and Fargo. He has received five Primetime Emmy Award nominations between 2019 and 2022 for episodes of Better Call Saul and Fargo and for the documentary George Carlin's American Dream. Temple shared a Motion Picture Sound Editors Golden Reel Award (tie) for the Ozark episode "The Toll".

== Early life and education ==
Temple earned a Bachelor of Music degree from Berklee College of Music in 1989. By 2011 he was based in Culver City, California, and released a self-titled album as a mobile app. Before concentrating on screen sound, he worked as a composer and producer in the music industry, a background later noted in trade coverage of his post-production career.

== Career ==
Temple’s television credits include multiple seasons of the Netflix crime drama Ozark, where he served as a sound effects editor, including the season three finale "All In". On AMC’s Better Call Saul, he was sound effects editor on "Bagman" and on the season six episode "Carrot and Stick". His work on FX’s Fargo includes the season four episode "East/West". Temple’s nonfiction credits include the two-part HBO documentary George Carlin’s American Dream.

== Awards ==
Temple has five Primetime Emmy nominations for Better Call Saul episode "Talk", Better Call Saul episode "Bagman", Fargo episode "East/West", Better Call Saul episode "Carrot and Stick", and the documentary George Carlin’s American Dream. He was part of the team that won the Motion Picture Sound Editors Golden Reel Award (tie) for Outstanding Achievement in Sound Editing – Episodic Long Form Effects/Foley for Ozark episode "The Toll". His work on Better Call Saul "Bagman" and Ozark "All In" also figured among Golden Reel honorees and category listings for 2021.
