= World War II with Tom Hanks =

WWII documentary series

- Genre: Documentary; History; War
- Presented by: Tom Hanks
- Original language: English
- No. of seasons: 1
- No. of episodes: 20

Production
- Running time: 42 minutes

Original release
- Network: History Channel
- Release: May 25 – July 27, 2026

World War II with Tom Hanks is a docuseries about the timeline of World War II, with Tom Hanks as its main narrator. The series spans 20 episodes, with each focusing on a unique milestone or period of time during the war.

== Episodes ==
No.	Title	Original release date
1	"The Beginning"	May 25, 2026
2	"Blitz"	May 25, 2026
3	"Barbarossa"	May 25, 2026
4	"Pearl Harbor"	June 1, 2026
5	"The War at Sea"	June 1, 2026
6	"Guadalcanal"	June 8, 2026
7	"Darkness Falls"	June 8, 2026
8	"Operation Torch"	June 15, 2026
9	"Secrets and Lies"	June 15, 2026
10	"Stalingrad"	June 22, 2026
11	"Italy"	June 29, 2026
12	"Battle for the Skies"	June 29, 2026
13	"Overlord"	July 6, 2026
14	"Long Road to Tokyo"	July 6, 2026
15	"Home Front"	July 13, 2026
16	"Resistance"	July 13, 2026
17	"No Surrender"	July 20, 2026
18	"Last Days of the Reich"	July 20, 2026
19	"Endgame"	July 27, 2026
20	"Fallout"	July 27, 2026

== Reception ==
The Decider wrote on STREAM IT: "As comprehensive as World War II With Tom Hanks seems it will be, even people who consider themselves experts in World War II might learn some new information about the massive conflagaration [sic] during the show's 20 episode[s]."The Guardian scored the series three out of five, criticizing the "monotonous rhythm" of academics and popular historians giving "takes that rarely contain major insights", concluding: "If your knowledge is sketchy, a 20-hour investment in this programme will provide you with the basics. It does feel basic, though: the war is too big for it."
