= Backyard Sports: The Animated Series =

Upcoming animated web series

- Based on: Backyard Sports and Backyard Baseball (series and 2026 game) by Playground Productions
- Showrunner: Christopher Waters
- Written by: Adam Aseraf; Sarah Nevada Smith
- Directed by: Juston Gordon-Montgomery
- Voices of: Tiffany Haddish; Donald Faison; Christopher Mintz-Plasse; Arturo Castro; Utkarsh Ambudkar; Deborah Baker Jr.; Michael Vlamis; Ashleigh Crystal Hairston; Will Neff; Vincent Tong; Joey Rudman; Lindsay Barnett
- Countries of origin: United States; Ireland
- Original languages: English; Spanish

Production
- Executive producers: Lindsay Barnett; Christopher Waters; Stuart Avi Savitski; Ari Pinchot
- Running time: 11 minutes
- Production companies: Playground Productions; Lighthouse Studios

Original release
- Network: YouTube

Backyard Sports: The Animated Series is an upcoming animated web series based on the Backyard Sports franchise produced by Playground Productions and Lighthouse Studios, with animation provided by the latter. The series serves as the third animated production in the franchise, following live-action/animated special NFL Backyard Basics: Football Tips from the Pros (2002) and Backyard Sports: The Animated Special (2026), the latter which this series continues from. It will consist of 20 episodes each running for 11 minutes and feature much of the voice cast from The Animated Special reprising their roles.

== Premise ==
The series features further adventures of the Backyard Kids happening around their neighborhood.

== Voice cast ==
- Tiffany Haddish as Kiesha Phillips, a jovial African American girl.
- Donald Faison as Dante Robinson, a short African American boy with a large afro and equally large appetite.
- Christopher Mintz-Plasse as Dmitri Petrovich, an intelligent and inventive Caucasian boy.
- Arturo Castro as Pablo Sanchez, a short, helpful, athletically skilled Hispanic boy who normally speaks Spanish.
- Utkarsh Ambudkar as Achmed Khan, a rock music loving Pakistani American boy.
- Deborah Baker Jr. as Kimmy Eckman, a candy-obsessed Caucasian girl.
- Michael Vlamis as Tony Delvecchio, a greaser-like Italian American boy.
- Ashleigh Crystal Hairston as Sunny Day, a cheerful African American girl who serves as play-by-play announcer of the Backyard Baseball League.
- Will Neff as Mr. Clanky, a robot built by Dmitri.
- Vincent Tong as Kenny Kawaguchi, a paraplegic Japanese American boy who plays sports in his wheelchair.
- Joey Rudman as Marky Dubois, a Cajun boy who has a pet frog and goes around barefooted. Marky previously made an unvoiced cameo in The Animated Special.
- Lindsay Barnett as Vinnie the Gooch, a snarky Caucasian boy who serves as color commentator of the Backyard Baseball League.
- TBA as Pete Wheeler, a fast but slow-witted Caucasian boy. Pete was previously voiced by Adam Pally in The Animated Special.
- TBA as Stephanie Morgan, a baseball enthusiast African American girl. Stephanie was previously voiced by Ego Nwodim in The Animated Special.
- TBA as Vicki Kawaguchi, a ballet-loving Japanese American girl and Kenny's sister. Vicki previously made an unvoiced cameo in The Animated Special.
- TBA as Angela Delvecchio, a clumsy yet spunky Italian American tomboy and Tony's sister. Angela previously made an unvoiced cameo in The Animated Special.

Haddish, Faison, Mintz-Plasse, Castro, Ambudkar, Baker, Vlamis, Hairston, and Barnett all reprise their roles from The Animated Special.

== Development ==
Backyard Sports: The Animated Special, a television special based on the Backyard Sports franchise, particularly the Backyard Baseball series, began development in April 2024, a month after Playground Productions CEO Lindsay Barnett gained the franchise's rights from film producers Stuart Avi Savitski and Ari Pinchot, who co-maintain film and television rights after the transfer. Irish animation studio Lighthouse Studios animated the special and co-produced it alongside Playground Productions. Production on the special completed in October 2025, and was released to YouTube in January 2026, thus providing the first major original production in the franchise since two mobile games released in 2015 and Playground Productions' reboot commenced in 2024. In November 2025, Barnett and Playground's chief product officer Chris Waters stated hopes that a scripted series would be made if the special is successful. The Animated Special would be followed by the release of a new Backyard Baseball game developed by Mega Cat Studios and published by Playground Productions on July 9, 2026; Lighthouse Studios animated the game's intro.

At San Diego Comic-Con on July 24, 2026, Playground Productions announced that the special would be followed up by a series titled Backyard Sports: The Animated Series. Lighthouse Studios will again provide animation, while several cast members from the special reprise their voice roles. Twenty episodes running for 11 minutes each will be produced. The announcement was accompanied by a sizzle reel teaser trailer featuring new footage and footage from The Animated Special, along with new images from the series. Waters will serve as the series' showrunner, as well as an executive producer alongside Barnett, Pinchot, and Savitsky. Juston Gordon-Montgomery will serve as the series' supervising director, while Adam Aseraf and Sarah Nevada Smith will be the head writers and also serve as co-executive producers. Ashleigh Crystal Hairston, the voice of Sunny Day in the special and the series, posted on Instagram that she would also be writing for the series. According to Bleeding Cool, the series is targeting a January 2027 release.

== Episodes ==
=== Pilot special ===
Title	Directed by	Written by	Original release date
Backyard Sports: The Animated Special "Sticky Situation" (Note: Reported formal title of the special; not used within the special proper.)	Mike Roberts	Joseph Purdy; Additional writing by : Will McRobb and Teddy McDonald; Story by : Joseph Purdy and Christopher Waters	January 29, 2026
Stephanie "Bubbles" Morgan is ready for the new season of the Backyard Baseball League until she accidentally spits out her "lucky" bubblegum. She and her teammates search the neighborhood for another pack of gum before the opening day game begins.

=== Series ===
No.	Title	Directed by	Written by	Original release date
1	TBA	TBA	TBA	TBA
2	TBA	TBA	TBA	TBA
3	TBA	TBA	TBA	TBA
4	TBA	TBA	TBA	TBA
5	TBA	TBA	TBA	TBA
6	TBA	TBA	TBA	TBA
7	TBA	TBA	TBA	TBA
8	TBA	TBA	TBA	TBA
9	TBA	TBA	TBA	TBA
10	TBA	TBA	TBA	TBA
11	TBA	TBA	TBA	TBA
12	TBA	TBA	TBA	TBA
13	TBA	TBA	TBA	TBA
14	TBA	TBA	TBA	TBA
15	TBA	TBA	TBA	TBA
16	TBA	TBA	TBA	TBA
17	TBA	TBA	TBA	TBA
18	TBA	TBA	TBA	TBA
19	TBA	TBA	TBA	TBA
20	TBA	TBA	TBA	TBA
