= Seth Savoy =

American film director (born 1992)

- Born: April 23, 1992 (age 34); Denver, Colorado, U.S.
- Occupations: Film director; screenwriter
- Parent(s): Scott J. Savoy; Alicia Savoy

Seth Savoy is an American film director, screenwriter and producer. He made his feature directorial debut with the 2020 crime drama Echo Boomers, starring Patrick Schwarzenegger, Alex Pettyfer and Michael Shannon. He has subsequently worked as a producer and executive producer across film and television, including Ghosts of the Void, Pools, United States of Rugby, Dog Years and Double Blind. His television series The Merc entered development at the BBC in 2025.

== Early life ==
Savoy was born in Denver, Colorado and grew up in Little Rock, Arkansas. He attended Catholic High School for Boys and later studied filmmaking at Columbia College Chicago.

== Career ==
Savoy began his career directing short films, music videos and commercial projects. His early films screened at festivals internationally. Savoy developed the screenplay for Echo Boomers while living in Chicago. In 2015, the screenplay won an independent pitch competition held at the Sundance Film Festival. The project was subsequently developed into Savoy's feature directorial debut.

Echo Boomers, co-written by Savoy, Kevin Bernhardt and Jason Miller, stars Patrick Schwarzenegger, Alex Pettyfer and Michael Shannon. Saban Films acquired the film for North American distribution, and it was released theatrically and digitally in November 2020.

Echo Boomers received mixed reviews from critics but a substantially more positive response from audiences. On Rotten Tomatoes, the film holds a 36% critic score based on 33 reviews and a 94% audience score based on more than 500 ratings. Richard Roeper of the Chicago Sun-Times gave the film three out of four stars, calling it a "nifty little gem" and writing that Savoy "displays real talent" as a director.

Savoy later expanded into producing. He produced the 2023 horror thriller Ghosts of the Void, directed by Jason Miller, and the 2025 coming-of-age film Pools, directed by Sam Hayes and starring Odessa A'zion, Mason Gooding, Ariel Winter and Michael Vlamis. In television, Savoy served as an executive producer on the six-part documentary series United States of Rugby, which follows the Chicago Hounds of Major League Rugby and premiered in 2025.

In 2025, Savoy was selected for the Writers Guild of America East's Showrunner Academy. His television series The Merc entered development at the BBC in February 2025. Savoy is also an executive producer of the upcoming romantic drama Dog Years, starring Xolo Maridueña, Leah Lewis, Xochitl Gomez and Brian David Gilbert, and is credited as an executive producer on the upcoming John Hyams thriller Double Blind, starring LaKeith Stanfield.

Savoy founded the Chicago-based film financing and production company Speakeasy Pictures in 2019.

== Filmography ==
2012 | Blood Brothers | Director |

2016 | Go | Director |

2016 | Closer to the Angels: New York City Ballet's 69th Anniversary | Director |

2017 | Pride | Producer |

2020 | Echo Boomers | Director, co-writer |

2023 | Ghosts of the Void | Producer |

2025 | United States of Rugby | Executive producer | Documentary television series

2025 | Pools | Producer |

TBA | Dog Years | Executive producer |

TBA | Double Blind | Executive producer |

TBA | The Merc | Creator, writer | Television series in development at BBC

== Film reviews ==
- Smith’s Verdict — https://smithsverdict.com/2013/05/25/blood-brothers-short-film/ Smith’s Verdict — https://smithsverdict.com/2016/01/22/beyond-the-bridge-short-film/
- Beauty Bolt — https://beautybolt.wordpress.com/2015/07/24/karrueche-trans-new-short-film-prxde/
- Flaunt — https://www.flaunt.com/blog/people-prxde-featuring-karrueche-tran
- MONROWE — https://monrowemagazine.com/2016/01/07/exclusive-short-film-featuring-the-revenants-will-poulter/
- Roeper, Richard (November 10, 2020). "'Echo Boomers' review: A nifty little gem about crooks with a cause". Chicago Sun-Times.
- Rotten Tomatoes — https://www.rottentomatoes.com/m/echo_boomers
- RogerEbert.com — https://www.rogerebert.com/reviews/echo-boomers-movie-review-2020
- Newcity — https://www.newcityfilm.com/2020/11/10/generation-debt-a-review-of-echo-boomers/
- Rotten Tomatoes — https://www.rottentomatoes.com/m/ghosts_of_the_void
- ScreenAnarchy — https://screenanarchy.com/2023/11/ghosts-of-the-void-review-sitting-in-cars-with-masked-boys.html
- Keith & the Movies — https://keithandthemovies.com/2023/10/11/review-ghosts-of-the-void-2023/
- RogerEbert.com — https://www.rogerebert.com/reviews/pools-movie-review-2025
- Rotten Tomatoes — https://www.rottentomatoes.com/m/pools_2025
- Film Threat — https://filmthreat.com/reviews/pools-coming-of-age-review/
- Metacritic — https://www.metacritic.com/movie/pools/critic-reviews/
- Forbes — https://www.forbes.com/sites/vitascarosella/2025/03/29/united-states-of-rugby-shows-the-realities-of-rugby-union-in-the-us/
- Rotten Tomatoes — https://www.rottentomatoes.com/tv/united_states_of_rugby
