= StuGo =

2025 animated series

- Genre: Comedy; Science fiction
- Created by: Ryan Gillis
- Voices of: Tania Gunadi; Zosia Mamet; Gabourey Sidibe; Lo Mutuc (Note: Credited as Charlyne Yi); Zach Reino; Deborah Baker Jr.; Lorraine Toussaint; Jake Green
- Theme music composer: Brad Breeck
- Composer: Brad Breeck
- Country of origin: United States
- Original language: English
- No. of seasons: 1
- No. of episodes: 20 (40 segments)

Production
- Executive producers: Ryan Gillis; Sunil Hall; Chris Prynoski; Shannon Prynoski; Antonio Canobbio; Ben Kalina
- Editor: John Wall
- Running time: 22–24 minutes
- Production companies: Titmouse, Inc.; Disney Television Animation

Original release
- Network: Disney Channel
- Release: January 11 – May 3, 2025

StuGo is an American animated science fiction comedy television series created by Ryan Gillis. The series follows a group of gifted middle schoolers who are invited to a Caribbean island by the mad scientist Dr. Lullah, under the pretense of attending a prestigious summer camp. A co-production between Titmouse, Inc. and Disney Television Animation, StuGo premiered on Disney Channel on January 11, 2025, and concluded on May 3, 2025.

Following the conclusion of the first season, rumors began to circulate that the series had been canceled. Gillis confirmed that the show had neither been renewed nor canceled, noting that its future depended on its viewership on Disney+. However, on December 18, 2025, it was confirmed that the series had been canceled after one season.

== Premise ==
Six gifted middle schoolers are invited to a mysterious island in the Caribbean for what they believe is a prestigious summer camp. They soon discover, however, that the camp is a ruse orchestrated by Dr. Lullah, a mad scientist who resides on the island. Unable to leave for three months, the students must navigate the island's dangerous flora and fauna, much of which has been created by Lullah.

== Voice cast ==
=== Main ===
- Tania Gunadi as Pliny, a creative, inventive, and resourceful Indonesian American girl. She is often nicknamed "Hat Glasses" by Dr. Lullah because of how her glasses and hat are close to each other.
- Zosia Mamet as Merian, an anxious, perfectionist white girl who is the daughter of two marine biologists.
- Gabourey Sidibe as:
  - Francis, a calm and stoic African American girl who almost always has a big smile on her face.
  - Svetlana, a mutant opossum who loves food and sneaking out and is one of the Night Mutants.
- Lo Mutuc as Larry, an enthusiastic, quirky, and adventurous Taiwanese American boy with a love of bugs and reptiles.
- Zach Reino as Chip Manhands, a nerdy, overconfident white boy whose real name is Drewnipper Hedgemaze. He is skilled in cooking and robotics.
- Deborah Baker Jr. as:
  - Sara, a headstrong and intensely competitive white girl.
  - Sarah, Sara's identical twin sister, whom Sara secretly brought to Dr. Lullah's island.
  - Future Sara, a future version of Sara.
- Lorraine Toussaint as Dr. Lullah, an intelligent, haughty, and aloof Trinidadian and Tobagonian mad scientist. She lured the kids to her island under the guise of running a summer camp to have them perform labor for her. While mostly dismissive of the kids, she holds respect for their talents. She created all the sapient and dangerous mutant lifeforms and other creatures of the island.
- Jake Green as:
  - Mr. Okay, a mutant Scottish Terrier and Dr. Lullah's assistant and partner-in-crime. He's one of the few smarter and loyal mutants of the island.
  - Glen Chompers, a mutant great white shark who has problems controlling his bare instincts on whom he tries to eat and hosts a news program in the episode "PANTelevision".

=== Recurring ===
- Ryan Gillis as:
  - Chicho, a mutant alligator with a small crocodile bird named "Little Pickle" on his head who is his companion, He is the self appointed leader of the mutants. He also hosts a mud-based television program in "PANTelevision".
  - Muscle Mouse, a blue mutant mouse with large muscles which make him very stronger as the others.
  - Turtle Mutant, a mutant box turtle.

=== Guest ===
- Sunil Hall as Sunil, a cargo ship captain associated with Dr. Lullah.
- David Sebastian Williams as the Narrator Fish, a metafictional mutant fish who likes to narrate about different things.
- Erica Jones as Rianne, a mutant common warthog and shopkeeper who befriends Chip. She hosts a cooking show in "PANTelevision".
- Fred Tatasciore as:
  - Snake Mutant, a mutant snake.
  - Keanu Mutant.
  - Nils Vulfen, a survivalist who refuses help from Chip on different occasions.
  - Jean-Michel, a raccoon and one of the few non-mutated beings on the island.
  - Glands, a mucus-spewing Z.O.R.B.Z. (Zorbular Orb Rorb Borb Zorbs).
- Kaitlyn Robrock as Tara, a bottlenose dolphin and Merian's adoptive sister.
- Fryda Wolff as Merian's mother.
- Johnny Pemberton as Peanut, a mutant betta.
- Eric Bauza as:
  - Bomb Swapper, a villain who swaps objects with bombs.
  - Big Mitchell, a mutant elephant seal.
  - Catapult Kevin, a mutant bass who hosts a catapult-based TV show.
  - Grim Reaper, the personification of death.
  - Arfthur, a known safety mascot.
- Cyrina Fiallo as Mariana Trent, a fish counter operator that works for Dr. Lullah. Her name references the Mariana Trench.
- Grey DeLisle as:
  - Flamingo Mutant, a mutant flamingo.
  - Elephant Triumvirate narrator.
- Marieve Herington as:
  - Zora, a mutant great horned owl.
  - Crabecca, a mutant hermit crab.
  - Bee Mutants, a group of mutant bees.
- Kayvan Novak as Thurstavius "Thurst" Brinkman Throop, a "mummified" naturalist.
- H. Michael Croner as Bakey Potatie, a chimpanzee who becomes cosmically enhanced after being launched into space.
- Debra Wilson as Agent, an unnamed operative of KROM.
- Fortune Feimster as Scrumptious, a mutant hermit crab.
- Rama Vallury as Colonel John Stoneman, the writer of the Elephant Triumvirate series who was abducted by Dr. Lullah.
- Josh Brener as Bombo, a mutant frog with disproportionately large legs.
- Robin Atkin Downes as Gunch, a mutant kookaburra.
- Tru Valentino as Zarconium, a member of the Crystal Delegates.
- Stephen Root as Dr. Rostrum, a mad scientist, rival of Dr. Lullah, and member of S.T.U.G.O. (short Secret Technological Unconventional Genius Organization) whose human head sticks out of the forehead of an octopus.

== Episodes ==
No.	Title	Directed by	Written by	Storyboard by	Original release date	Prod. code
1	"Legitimate Summer Camp"	Erica Jones & Steve Wolfhard	Ryan Gillis	Derek Evanick, Madeleine Flores, Diana Lafyatis & Sonja von Marensdorff	January 11, 2025	102
1	"Dog Eat Dog"	Ryan Gillis	Ryan Gillis	Nathan Bulmer, Ryan Gillis & Zach Marcus	January 1, 2025 (Note: This episode premiered as a sneak peek. It made its official premiere on January 11, 2025.)	102
Six overachieving middle schoolers — Pliny, Merian, Chip, Larry, Sara, and Francis — arrive at a mysterious island summer camp run by the mad scientist Dr. Lullah, who tasks them with fixing her broken laser. When they discover the laser's power crystal is burnt out, the kids embark on a journey across the island to retrieve a new one. When the kids' food supply is stolen by the island's animal mutants, they challenge the thieves to a series of competitions to win it back.
2	"The Nannytee"	Hannah Ayoubi	Liz Hara	Madeleine Flores & Sonja von Marensdorff	January 11, 2025	103
2	"Noodle It (A Little Bit)"	Hannah Ayoubi	Jon Millstein	Rose Feduk & Kaitlyn Graziano	January 11, 2025	103
Dr. Lullah creates a manatee/nanny hybrid to watch over the kids while having some alone time to work on her jet ski, but Francis is suspicious about it. Pliny teaches Larry to noodle, but he soon makes it a habit and develops a massive ego.
3	"Diorama Drama"	Erica Jones	Jon Millstein	Rose Feduk & Kaitlyn Graziano	January 19, 2025	101
3	"Goat Racket"	Hannah Ayoubi	Amalia Levari	Nathan Bulmer & Ron Stanage	January 19, 2025	101
When the kids explore a vending machine, they fall into a room housing a diorama of Dr. Lullah's island, but the figurines come to life whenever they are put in the diorama and wreak havoc on the actual island. This leads to Pliny facing off against a gigantic Pteranodon on the diorama. The kids encounter multicolored beans that attract Sara. After coming across numerous grey ones, she plays a trick that causes Larry to give all his beans to her. She begins feeling guilty about it, so she orchestrates another scam to give Larry his beans back, but it turns the tables on Larry when he gets attacked by goats.
4	"Breakfast at Chippany's"	Erica Jones	Jon Millstein	Nathan Bulmer & Ron Stanage	January 19, 2025	104
4	"Birdyguard"	Steve Wolfhard	Janice Chun & Sunil Hall	Derek Evanick & Diana Lafyatis	January 19, 2025	104
Trying to make the best breakfast in the world, Chip searches for ingredients and befriends a mutant warthog shopkeeper named Rianne, who traps him and his friends in a cave full of sentient mushrooms including the one that's controlling Rianne. Larry befriends a baby lizard but must protect it from a night heron who's trying to eat it.
5	"No Manhands Is an Island"	Steve Wolfhard	Ben Crouse	Thomas Herpich	January 26, 2025	105
5	"Sister Swim"	Hannah Ayoubi	Ben Crouse	Rose Feduk & Kaitlyn Graziano	January 26, 2025	105
Chip dedicates himself to survival after reading a Nils Vulfren comic, but he pushes his tactics too far even when he encounters the real-life survivalist. When Merian's adoptive sister, a bottlenose dolphin named Tara, visits the kids, Merian becomes highly jealous of her.
6	"Moon Moon"	Hannah Ayoubi	Jon Millstein	Madeleine Flores & Sonja von Marensdorff	January 26, 2025	106
6	"Mailbog"	Erica Jones	Amalia Levari	Derek Evanick & Diana Lafyatis	January 26, 2025	106
Sara is sent to the moon by Dr. Lullah to stop a rover from drawing a rear on the moon ever since an incident where Dr. Lullah tried to draw her face on it, which was erased by NASA. Francis and the kids embark on a journey to deliver letters to a very unusual place.
7	"Finder's Kelpers"	Hannah Ayoubi	Amalia Levari & Jessica Combs	Gina Gress	February 2, 2025	108
7	"Truck Everlasting"	Erica Jones	Ben Crouse	Rose Feduk & Kaitlyn Graziano	February 2, 2025	108
Dr. Lullah and Mr. Okay set up a game show called Finders Keepers to harvest stuff from the island's abandoned beach town during low tide. Pliny teams up with a tribe of sentient kelp to take back their things from Dr. Lullah. After Dr. Lullah entrusts Sara with the title of "Mud Puppy", Mr. Okay worries that she will replace him and flashes back to when he first met Dr. Lullah when he was originally a regular Scottish Terrier.
8	"Alpha Betta Chip"	Steve Wolfhard	Liz Hara	Derek Evanick & Diana Lafyatis	February 9, 2025	107
8	"The Bomb Swapper"	Hannah Ayoubi	Greg Miller	Nathan Bulmer & Ron Stanage	February 9, 2025	107
While working on a Tree Swapper device that would cause trees to swap branches, Chip comes to the defense of a mutant betta named Peanut who is being picked on by the larger bettas. He decides to teach Peanut how to defend himself against the larger bettas. The kids introduce Mr. Communitater, a potato communicator, to Dr. Lullah in an effort to amuse her only for her to get annoyed with them and tell them to leave. The kids are convinced that Dr. Lullah hates them, so they use the idea to prank her into thinking that one of her fellow villains is holding the kids for ransom. Unbeknownst to them, the prank ends up attracting a villain named Bomb Swapper to Dr. Lullah's island when the kids claim that he is the one who captured them.
9	"The Wolf of Jealousy"	Hannah Ayoubi	Jon Millstein	Rose Feduk & Kaitlyn Graziano	February 16, 2025	109
9	"Stench Mensch"	Steve Wolfhard	Ryan Gillis & Amalia Levari	Nathan Bulmer & Ron Stanage	February 16, 2025	109
Larry attempts to show off his trick to the mutants with no avail, as the others have found a way to turn the garbage into gold. When Francis is actually turned into gold, a flounder mutant declares Francis as the chosen one causing Larry to get jealous enough to manifest a ferocious green demonic wolf with emerald eyes. While observing some grubs, Pliny finds a tape where Dr. Lullah had humiliated herself at a weight-lifting contest as Dr. Lullah wants her to sign an NDA. She then tends to a grub named Pudding as it starts to grow. Pliny will not help Dr. Lullah with getting Pudding to the toads when she expects her to sign the NDA regarding the tape.
10	"Francis Wants to Be Alone"	Erica Jones	Jamie Loftus	Madeleine Flores & Sonja von Marensdorff	February 23, 2025	110
10	"The Sash"	Erica Jones	Ben Crouse & Amalia Levari	Derek Evanick & Diana Lafyatis	February 23, 2025	110
As Merian throws a party for her and her friends, she hears from Francis that she needs to be alone for a while. Merian rallies her friends to find out why Francis wants to be alone. Merian recalls a similar situation that she once had at her school with a girl named Samantha, who became distant from her. While wearing a presidential sash, Merian has her friends clean up the beach on Dr. Lullah's island. When it comes to becoming the empress of the island, a vote is cast. Due to a need for a deciding vote, the kids turn to Dr. Lullah, who suggests that Merian should have the title. Soon, Merian and her friends encounter a mutant elephant seal named Big Mitchell and a large worm mutant.
11	"Deep Trent"	Steve Wolfhard	Colleen Evanson & Sunil Hall	Madeleine Flores & Katie Aldworth	March 1, 2025	111
11	"Disaster Play"	Hannah Ayoubi	Liz Hara	Nathan Bulmer & Ron Stanage	March 1, 2025	111
As the kids place stuff into a tube while cleaning Dr. Lullah's submarine, Merian and Pliny take it beneath the water and trace the tube to an underwater lab where a woman named Mariana Trent works as Dr. Lullah's fish counter operator as there is a claim that there are others "employed" on Dr. Lullah's island. Realizing that Mariana's potential is being wasted, Merian decides to bring Mariana back up to argue with Dr. Lullah who fires Mariana and has Merian take her place. Mariana ends up coming in handy when some merpeople threaten the island. While trying to get honey for her tea from a large beehive, Dr. Lullah accidentally launches it from the tree on which it lands on top of the island's volcano. Because of a lesser incident last time, the mutants will not listen to her as Dr. Lullah has the kids work on warning the mutants in the mutant market of the upcoming hot honey and bee attacks. The kids plan to put on a play that will help alert the mutants as Merian becomes the understudy to Sara's "self-understudy". When the mutants see the player after a fight between a flamingo mutant and a mouse mutant ends, Merian becomes Sara's "self-understudy" when using the climax to warn the mutants, only to end up doing something that seem to anger a chimpanzee mutant.
12	"Shapesister"	Erica Jones	Jon Millstein	Rose Feduk & Kaitlyn Graziano	March 8, 2025	112
12	"Lullah's Game"	Steve Wolfhard	Liz Hara	Derek Evanick & Diana Lafyatis	March 8, 2025	112
While playing dodgeball, the kids accidentally throw it in a hole that leads deep into their ship living space. With Francis not wanting to go down to get it, the others go down to look for the ball. Sara ensures that none of them encounter her twin sister Sarah who was snuck onto the island. Their tricks work on Sara's friends until Pliny is left. Dr. Lullah breaks up the ball game that the kids are having, as there are no winners or losers. As she and Mr. Okay take them to a blank room, Dr. Lullah has them place their hands in an obelisk as part of an endurance game. Whoever keeps their hand in the hole the longest wins. The competition is very long and exhausting as Dr. Lullah tries to get them to lose. This leads to only Pliny and Sara being left in the game.
13	"Night Mutants"	Hannah Ayoubi	Dominique Gélin	Madeleine Flores & Sonja von Marensdorff	March 15, 2025	113
13	"Chunk Beastknuckles"	Erica Jones	Ben Crouse	Ben Bury	March 15, 2025	113
Larry has a routine before sleeping at night. He does an experiment to see if he can experience the nightlife. This leads to him befriending a great horned owl mutant named Zora and her opossum mutant friend named Svetlana. Larry experiences the nightlife with them as he eats bugs, partakes in techno parties, and spray-paints things. Thanks to advice from Zora to throw off his friends, Larry dresses a normal raccoon named Jean-Michel to pose as him, causing his friends to believe he turned into a raccoon. While out in nature with Larry, Chip has another encounter with survivalist Nils Vulfren who is now surviving on Dr. Lullah's island and working on finding a worthy apex predator. Wanting to have Vulfren's plan realized, Chip has Dr. Lullah splice him with different animal DNA to become a hybrid apex predator where he calls himself Chunk Beastknuckles. Though Vulfren is initially unimpressed, Chip knocks him toward Dr. Lullah's lab. Having used the same gene splicer, Vulfren emerges as a hybrid creature while rebranding himself to Kils Megavulfen as they fight it out.
14	"The Leg Farm"	Steve Wolfhard	Meredith Kecskemety	Nathan Bulmer & Ron Stanage	March 22, 2025	114
14	"Unquenchable Thurst"	Steve Wolfhard	Matt Chapman & Ryan Gillis	Sonja von Marensdorff & Katie Aldworth	March 22, 2025	114
Unlike the other kids, Merian cannot relax. When she tries to help Dr. Lullah out around the lab, it annoys her. Under Dr. Lullah's orders, Mr. Okay takes Merian to the leg farm to relax and tend to the grown legs as Dr. Lullah has them grown for any mutants that break their legs. As Chip keeps getting stuff stuck to him, Pliny discovers a thin-as-paper "mummified" naturalist named Thurstavius "Thurst" Brinkman Throop trapped in the bog and ends up freeing him. Pliny helps Thurst find something worth the discovery of his lifetime.
15	"Plantcis"	Erica Jones	Liz Hara	Derek Evanick & Diana Lafyatis	March 29, 2025	115
15	"Big Ol' Heads Egg Salad Venture"	Hannah Ayoubi	Ben Crouse	Rose Feduk & Kaitlyn Graziano	March 29, 2025	115
Pliny enlists Francis to watch over her house plant while she and Merian go to rescue Chip as Larry and Sara are unavailable due to them working to wrangle a centipede. Using a communicator to hear the plant's thoughts, Francis learns the plant's name is Mimosa "Moe" Strigillosa. Moe enlists Francis to protect him from the other plants so that they can get back to the greenhouse where he was raised. While trying to get a new business venture idea, Merian gets the idea to assist Pliny in setting up an egg salad stand where they would sell egg salad to the local mutants. As the egg salad stand is being developed, Merian keeps getting visited by a vision of her 30-year-old self who states that its a bad idea and her 60-year-old self who states that what her 30-year-old self said was wrong.
16	"PANTelevision"	Hannah Ayoubi	Ben Crouse	Nathan Bulmer & Ron Stanage	April 5, 2025	116
16	"Infinity Braid"	Erica Jones	Sunil Hall & Jon Millstein	Rose Feduk & Kaitlyn Graziano	April 5, 2025	116
After having to feed a large cave dog, the kids have contracted dog flu causing Mr. Okay to quarantine them for a while. To keep them busy, Mr. Okay leaves them an old-fashioned mobile television that is tuned into PANTelevision, which is broadcast over the island and advises the mutants not to rebel against Dr. Lullah. The kids watch the television and see different shows like Chicho's mud-rubbing show, Catapult Kevin, Kiss Cam, a commercial for Tara's Greatest Hits, Dr. Lullah's space launch being commentated by Blood Pressure and Mutanaut, The Hole, Rianne's cooking show, Dr. Lullah's News, Dimpey's STUCO, Trent Tube, and a commercial for the leg farm. The kids get hooked on to Hand Holders, where a poison dart frog mutant named "Frogatha" tries to touch the hand of Big Mitchell after everyone else she touched died from her poison. When Mr. Okay keeps checking in on them as he needs to watch his stories, the kids lie that they haven't gotten better, causing Mr. Okay to become suspicious. Francis is planning on doing a painting of everyone as they show off their respective hair styles. Sara had one with poodle shape until Pliny arrives with her noodle-themed hairstyle. As Francis has one hour before she starts her painting, Sara enlists Mr. Okay to help her find a new hair style. When one hairstyle ends up round, Sara and Mr. Okay rope Dr. Lullah into helping out. Her experiment has Sara's round hair style turned into a time tunnel enabling Dr. Lullah to obtain a baby woolly mammoth. When it appears to be the right hairstyle, Sara shows if off until the head of an adult woolly mammoth emerges.
17	"Primate Fear"	Steve Wolfhard	Liz Hara	Derek Evanick & Diana Lafyatis	April 12, 2025	117
17	"Francis' Last Straw"	Hannah Ayoubi	Ben Crouse	Madeleine Flores & Sonja von Marensdorff	April 12, 2025	117
When a cosmic-enhanced space chimpanzee named Bakey Potatie crash-lands on Dr. Lullah's island and goes on a rampage, he is subdued by Dr. Lullah who plans to lock him up. Merian acts as his lawyer with Francis as her paralegal in a court case overseen by Honorabl3 Impartial-Bot. Chip and Pliny take turns as Dr. Lullah's lawyer since Mr. Okay is recording his fitness podcast "Blast Your Biscuits". As Dr. Lullah and Mr. Okay work on a black hole-type coffee, the kids take a boat out of six different sandbars and play a game of "Geoplomacy" where Francis is withdrawn. When Dr. Lullah's black hole coffee sucks the island into a black hole, the kids work on surviving causing Francis to become more dominant. The others soon learn why Francis has a reason why she avoids playing geoplomacy.
18	"Phishin' Chip"	Steve Wolfhard	Sunil Hall	Derek Evanick & Diana Lafyatis	April 19, 2025	118
18	"Shell-Shock!"	Erica Jones	Jamie Loftus	Nathan Bulmer & Ron Stanage	April 19, 2025	118
When Chip finally gets the Internet for the island, he opens a URL that promises a free gift card only for Dr. Lullah to destroys the computer and reprimand the kids as the computer would've compromised her island. Having been called a nincompoop by Dr. Lullah for falling for a phishing scam, Chip is later visited by a large woman who is a secret agent from KORM. He is enlisted by the secret agent to help take down Dr. Lullah while outwitting his friends along the way. As Mr. Okay has the kids try out Dr. Lullah's Super-Fun-Wow-Slide which is a disguised Torso Accelerator, Larry nearly has an accident with a stalagtite and catches a glimpse of the Grim Reaper. Traumatized by the experience, Larry gets himself a shell as part of his way of remaining safe as Merian does the same thing. They befriend some mutant hermit crabs named Crabecca and Scrumptious as they are on their way to the Shell of Zanzibub. When the truth about the Shell of Zanzibub involving a giant mutated eel is revealed, Larry must return to making risks in order to save everyone.
19	"Elephant Triumvirate Book 6: Trunkumvirate Triumphaphant"	Hannah Ayoubi	Jon Millstein	Carder Scholin	April 26, 2025	120
19	"Z.O.R.B.Z. (Zorbular Orb Rorb Borb Zorbs)"	Hannah Ayoubi	Ben Crouse	Nathan Bulmer & Ron Stanage	April 26, 2025	120
Sara finds that her friends have a book club where they are reading the Elephant Trimvirate book series about human life suffering the forgetting of breathing and elephants evolving to human form. It was mentioned that Sara is indifferent to the different books that they read. As book six hasn't come out yet, Sara claims that she managed to obtain a manuscript about it as she enlists Sarah and Future Sara to track down the writer Colonel John Stoneman who actually went missing on Dr. Lullah's island since Dr. Lullah heard about his back massages. They try to enlist Jon to help them out to no avail as he doesn't want to misuse his hands anymore. When Larry shows off a gashapon machine he found, they find an advertisement for creatures called Z.O.R.B.Z. (short for Zorbular Orb Rorb Borb Zorbs). When each of the kids gets their own Z.O.R.B.Z., Larry gets a sickly-looking one called Glands. When it lacks the amenities that the other kids' Z.O.R.B.Z. have, Larry enlists Mr. Okay to help train Glands due to Mr. Okay being a former Z.O.R.B.Z. trainer. They try various methods around the island to unlock Glands potential needed to evolve where it was even mentioned that Mr. Okay once tossed his Glands into the lake after failing with it. This leads to the most unlikeliest of potentials when it comes to a Z.O.R.B.Z. battle with the other kids' Z.O.R.B.Z.
20	"Pea-Brained Mutant Crystal Nuptials"	Steve Wolfhard	Ben Crouse & Sunil Hall	Rose Feduk & Kaitlyn Graziano	May 3, 2025	119
20	"S.T.U.G.O."	Erica Jones	Ryan Gillis	Madeline Flores & Sonja Von Marensdorff	May 3, 2025	119
Dr. Lullah awaits a dinner for the Crystal Delegates, who promise her one wish after dinner. The mutants Chicho, Bombo, and Gunch inadvertently knock her out after trying to gain access to the dining room in search of answers revolving around a bowl of mysterious berries. The trio, believing they had just killed her, bury her poorly, but Mr. Okay, who is on an undercover mission at the Dog United Nations, tells them to unbury her. The mutants decide to use her unconscious body as a puppet for the dinner, wanting to use the Crystals' wish to discover what the berries are indeed for. They find out that the Crystals all have very small mouths, so Bombo has the other mutants melt the large shards of glass they had served to liquid; during this time, he finds himself falling in love with Zarconium, a Crystal Delegate. Dessert is almost a disaster, but the berries soothe the Crystals, and they finally offer Lullah her wish. However, Bombo, speaking as Lullah, wants to marry Zarconium. At the wedding ceremony, Lullah comes to, and Bombo reveals his true self, telling Zarconium that he had been controlling Lullah this entire time. Regardless, Zarconium marries Bombo. Soon, the Crystal Delegates leave and Lullah reveals that the wish was intended to protect them all from the impact of a giant meteor. Chico, Bombo, and Gunch declare their love for Dr. Lullah as the giant meteor approaches. After helping her build a robot suit, the kids have had enough of Dr. Lullah's bossiness, and with six weeks left of their summer vacation, leave her behind to join Dr. Rostrum, Lullah's rival and a mad scientist from the Secret Technological Unconventional Genius Organization (S.T.U.G.O.). He takes over the laboratory following his assessment for S.T.U.G.O. and takes them to the rooms that Dr. Lullah never took them to. Dr. Rostrum, actually an octopus with a human head sticking out, has the kids work on a glove that can make portals. He wants to harness the power of whirlpools to destroy the world as he starts making a giant portal that starts sucking up everything on Dr. Lullah's island. The horrified kids turn to Lullah and Mr. Okay. Pliny tells her she will not apologize to her and she has to take responsibility for their curriculum. Allowing the kids to co-pilot the suit with her and Mr. Okay, Lullah battles with Rostrum before he can do sizable damage to the island. Dr. Lullah defeats Dr. Rostrum and sends him through the giant portal. Regretful over her treatment of the kids, Lullah offers them the opportunity to go to a real summer camp as they have six weeks of summer left. They choose to stay. Pledging to remember their names as best as she can, Dr. Lullah grants them full access to the island.

== Shorts ==
=== StuGo: Shorts (2025) ===
No.	Title	Original release date
1	"Pliny's Playful Mutants"	July 24, 2025
2	"Chip's Portal Problem"	July 25, 2025
3	"Hi Grandma, It's Not Francis"	July 26, 2025
4	"Don't Wormy, Be Larry"	July 27, 2025
5	"The Snitch Report with Merian"	July 28, 2025
6	"Sara's Sick Rover Stunt"	July 29, 2025

=== Chibi Tiny Tales (2025) ===
No.	Title	Original release date
1	"Kids vs. Mutants: Who Is Faster?"	August 2, 2025
2	"Kids vs. Mutants: Who Is More Civilised?"	August 2, 2025
3	"Kids vs. Mutants vs. Monsters: Who Is More Nurturing?"	August 9, 2025

=== How NOT to Draw (2025) ===
No.	Title	Original release date
1	"Dr. Lullah"	September 6, 2025

=== Theme Song Takeover (2025) ===
No.	Title	Original release date
1	"Dr. Lullah"	November 1, 2025

== Production ==
=== Development ===
In 2019, Ryan Gillis pitched to Disney Television Animation a series inspired by the time he took a study-abroad course during college, in which they were free to do as they wanted outside of class. The series was greenlit in 2022, with production starting in 2023. Gillis settled on the title StuGo after finding it on Google and feeling it fit with the show's themes.

StuGo was announced on June 13, 2023. The series is produced by Titmouse, Inc. and directed by Hannah Ayoubi, Erica Jones, and Steve Wolfhard. Gillis serves as the executive producer along with Hall, while Craig Lewis is story editor.

In December 2025, the show's creator, Ryan Gillis, announced on social media that the show would not be returning for a second season.

=== Writing ===
The series focuses primarily on episodic storytelling, with the writers wanting each episode to "stand on its own" as a way to provide further access to audiences, while also incorporating continuity and world building across the episodes. Gillis wanted the humor to focus primarily on knowing more about the characters, with a lot of the humor centering on the friction between the cast as they deal with their current situation.

=== Casting ===
During the series' announcement, it was reported that Tania Gunadi, Zosia Mamet, Gabourey Sidibe, Lo Mutuc, Zach Reino, Deborah Baker Jr., and Lorraine Toussaint would compose its main cast, with Jake Green announced as part of the cast in December 2024. The series occasionally features guest characters who were written with a particular actor in mind as an "archetype" for the character. Kristi Reed served as a voice director on the show.

=== Animation ===
Animation services for the series were provided by Titmouse and Snipple Animation Studios, while Sam Bosma served as art director. The visual style for the show was inspired by the Caribbean and South Florida, with Gillis wanting to avoid depicting a romanticized depiction of tropical life by depicting the buildings as degraded due to the environment. He also wanted Dr. Lullah's technology to be distinctive from other shows with mad scientists by incorporating "plaster, Spanish tile and art deco flourishes". Inspirations for the series' Mutants include adventure serials such as Jonny Quest and the works of Ray Harryhausen as well as Gillis' life in Florida.

== Release ==
StuGo's singular season premiered on January 11, 2025, on Disney Channel, and concluded on May 3, 2025. It was released on Disney+ on July 30, 2025. The series was originally scheduled to premiere on October 17, 2024, shortly after the premiere of a sing-along version of Big City Greens the Movie: Spacecation.

== Reception ==
Fernanda Camargo of Common Sense Media rated the series a four-out-of-five stars, calling the series a "funny survival show plays with stereotypes for laughs."
