= A Man on the Inside =

2024 American comedy series

- Genre: Comedy
- Created by: Michael Schur
- Based on: The Mole Agent by Maite Alberdi
- Starring: Ted Danson; Mary Elizabeth Ellis; Lilah Richcreek Estrada; Stephanie Beatriz; Mary Steenburgen
- Music by: David Schwartz
- Country of origin: United States
- Original language: English
- No. of seasons: 2
- No. of episodes: 16

Production
- Executive producers: Michael Schur; Morgan Sackett; David Miner; Maite Alberdi; Christopher Clements; Julie Goldman; Marcela Santibañez
- Producer: Nate Young
- Cinematography: David J. Miller
- Editors: Sue Federman; Jason Gill
- Running time: 27–38 minutes
- Production companies: Fremulon; 3 Arts Entertainment; Dunshire Productions; Motto Pictures; Micromundo; Universal Television

Original release
- Network: Netflix
- Release: November 21, 2024 – present

A Man on the Inside is an American comedy television series created by Michael Schur and starring Ted Danson as a retiree turned amateur private investigator. It is based on the 2020 documentary film The Mole Agent directed by Maite Alberdi.

The series premiered on November 21, 2024, receiving critical acclaim. It was renewed for a second season in December of that year; it was subsequently released on November 20, 2025. In February 2026, the series was renewed for a third and final season.

== Cast ==
=== Main ===
- Ted Danson as Charles Nieuwendyk, a widower and retired college engineering professor who takes a job as an investigative assistant for a private detective for Kovalenko Investigations to investigate a missing necklace at Pacific View Retirement Community. He returns in season 2 as a private investigator for Kovalenko Investigations to investigate a missing laptop at Wheeler College.
- Mary Elizabeth Ellis as Emily, Charles' daughter who lives in Sacramento with her husband Joel Piñero and their three teenage sons
- Lilah Richcreek Estrada as Julie Kovalenko, a private investigator of Kovalenko Investigations who hires Charles
- Stephanie Beatriz as Didi Santos Cordero (season 1 and 3, recurring season 2), the managing director of Pacific View Retirement Community
- Mary Steenburgen as Mona Margadoff (seasons 2-3), a music theory professor at Wheeler College and Charles' love interest

=== Recurring ===
- Eugene Cordero as Joel Piñero, Emily's husband
- Sally Struthers as Virginia Foldau
- Marc Evan Jackson as Evan Cubbler (season 1), Julie's client
- Kerry O'Malley as Megan Chagughlaight-Accourse, Julie's assistant at Kovalenko Investigations
- Margaret Avery as Florence Joanne Whistbrook (season 1), Virginia's best friend at the Pacific View Retirement Community
- John Getz as Elliott Haverhill.
- Susan Ruttan as Gladys Montrose (season 1), Charles' neighbor at the Pacific View Retirement Community who was a costume designer
- Veronica Cartwright as Beverly Bankl (season 1)
- Miles Fowler as Jaylen LaMont (season 1), a staff member of Pacific View Retirement Community
- Clyde Kusatsu as Grant Yokohama (season 1, guest season 2)
- Stephen McKinley Henderson as Calbert Graham, a lonely resident at the Pacific View Retirement Community whom Charles befriends
- Lori Tan Chinn as Susan Yang (season 1), the Pacific View Retirement Community resident council president
- Jama Williamson as Beatrice Vanbeck (season 1), the activities director of Pacific View Retirement Community
- Nelson Franklin as Rick Whuzmarc (season 1), the corporate administrator of Pacific View Retirement Community
- Deuce Basco as Jace Nieuwendyk-Piñero, Emily and Joel's eldest son
- Lincoln Lambert as Nico Nieuwendyk-Piñero, Emily and Joel's middle son
- Wyatt Yang as Wyatt Nieuwendyk-Piñero, Emily and Joel's youngest son
- Gary Cole (Note: In season 2, Cole is credited as "Special Guest Starring" but is a recurring cast member.) as Brad Vinick (season 2), a controversial billionaire who is the CEO of Vinick Capital
- Max Greenfield (Note: In season 2, Greenfield is credited as "Special Guest Starring" but is a recurring cast member.) as Jack Berenger (season 2), the president of Wheeler College
- David Strathairn (Note: In season 2, Strathairn is credited as "Special Guest Starring" but is a recurring cast member.) as Dr. Benjamin Cole (season 2), a professor who is the head of the English department at Wheeler College
- Jill Talley as Holly Bodgemark (season 2), the provost of Wheeler College
- Michaela Conlin as Andrea Yi (season 2), a professor of economics at Wheeler College
- Sam Huntington as Max Griffin (season 2), an outspoken journalism assistant professor at Wheeler College
- Linda Park as Betsy Muki (season 2), a professor and the director of fine arts at Wheeler College
- Constance Marie (Note: In season 2, Marie is credited as "Special Guest Starring" but is a recurring cast member.) as Vanessa Cascade (season 2), Julie's estranged mother who was a professional con artist
- Lisa Gilroy as Kelseigh Rose Vinick (season 2), the chaotic young wife of Brad Vinick

=== Special guest starring ===
- Jason Mantzoukas as Apollo Lambrakis (season 2), Vanessa's boyfriend

== Production ==
Michael Schur and his producing partner Morgan Sackett had been adapting the 1989 film Field of Dreams for Peacock. The series did not move forward, so Sackett sent Schur an email asking if he had seen The Mole Agent, to adapt that into a television series. Sackett suggested, via an email he sent to Schur, that Danson play the lead.

In March 2023, it was announced that Danson was to star in the series. The rest of the cast was announced in February 2024; at the time, the series was titled A Classic Spy. While filming on location in San Francisco and in the redwoods along the Russian River, the cast and crew were staying at the Fairmont hotel at the same time as U.S. President Joe Biden. Only the exterior shots were filmed on location in San Francisco, with the sole exception of an interior shot of the Piazza Pellegrini restaurant. In August, Netflix released first look images from the series.

It was announced on December 16, 2024, that the series had been renewed for a second season for a 2025 release. In March 2025, Danson's real-life wife Mary Steenburgen was cast in a lead role for the second season. Filming for the second season began in May 2025, with first season cast members returning and Steenburgen being included among several new cast members.

On February 3, 2026, Netflix renewed the series for a third season. On September 23, 2026, it was announced that the upcoming third season will be the final season.

== Release ==
The first season of A Man on the Inside was released on Netflix on November 21, 2024, with all eight episodes. The second season premiered on November 20, 2025, with all eight episodes.

== Episodes ==
=== Series overview ===
Series overview for Rutherford Falls
Season	Episodes	Originally released
1	8	November 21, 2024
2	8	November 20, 2025

=== Season 1 (2024) ===
No. overall	No. in season	Title	Directed by	Written by	Original release date
1	1	"Tinker Tailor Older Spy"	Michael Schur	Michael Schur	November 21, 2024
Charles, a widowed and retired engineering professor is lonely and in a monotonous routine following his wife's passing. His daughter, Emily, concerned about his isolation, encourages him to find a new pursuit to revitalise his life. Charles stumbles upon a newspaper advertisement seeking an elderly individual for an undercover role in a private investigation. Intrigued, he responds and meets Julie Kovalenko, a private investigator aiming to solve a theft at the Pacific View Retirement Community. Julie hires Charles to infiltrate the community as a resident and act as her "man on the inside." Despite initial reservations, particularly due to memories of his late wife's battle with Alzheimer's, Charles accepts the assignment. He moves into Pacific View, where he encounters a diverse group of residents and staff, including the affable yet enigmatic Virginia Foldau and the diligent managing director, Didi. As Charles embarks on his covert mission, he begins to navigate the complexities of his new environment, setting the stage for personal growth and unexpected connections. The title is a reference to Tinker Tailor Soldier Spy.
2	2	"The Man Who Knew Too Much About Bridges"	Morgan Sackett	Sylvia Batey Alcalá	November 21, 2024
Charles continues his undercover mission at Pacific View Retirement Community. He attends a lively happy hour, charming fellow residents like Virginia and Florence, and steps in as bartender, enhancing his popularity. However, his investigation faces challenges: a misstep with the wrong Helen leads to an awkward encounter, and a mysterious note warning him to "back off" raises concerns about his cover. Charles suspects Elliott, a cigar-smoking resident, and confronts him, only to discover Elliott's jealousy over Virginia prompted the note. This revelation shifts Charles's focus to the staff's unrestricted access to residents' rooms, suggesting a potential avenue for the thefts. The episode concludes with the theft of Elliott's antique watch, adding complexity to Charles's investigation and deepening the mystery within the community. The title is a reference to The Man Who Knew Too Much.
3	3	"The Emily Always Rings Twice"	Rebecca Asher	Hayley Frazier & Emalee Burditt	November 21, 2024
Charles's covert assignment at Pacific View Retirement Community faces complications with the unexpected arrival of his daughter, Emily. Concerned about her father's well-being, Emily's visit forces Charles to juggle his undercover investigation with maintaining his familial relationships. Simultaneously, another resident reports a missing item, intensifying suspicions within the community. Elliott, a fellow resident already wary of Charles, directs his frustrations towards him, and punches him in the nose. Charles must navigate these challenges, striving to uphold his cover while addressing Emily's concerns and managing Elliott's distrust. The title is a reference to The Postman Always Rings Twice.
4	4	"The Curious Incident of the Dog in the Painting Class"	Rebecca Asher	Bridget Stinson	November 21, 2024
Charles participates in various group activities at Pacific View, such as painting classes and book clubs, to observe residents and identify potential suspects. His growing camaraderie with fellow residents raises concerns for Julie, who worries that his personal connections might compromise the investigation. Despite her reservations, Charles believes that building trust is essential to uncovering the truth. The title is a reference to The Curious Incident of the Dog in the Night-Time.
5	5	"Presents and Clear Danger"	Anu Valia	Janet Leahy & Alex Farber	November 21, 2024
Julie introduces an expensive gift as bait to lure the thief, while Charles focuses on connecting with Gladys, a resident showing signs of memory loss. Virginia encourages Florence to indulge in a long-desired purchase, adding to the community's dynamics. Charles's interactions with Gladys provide unexpected insights, leading him to reconsider his investigative approach. The title is a reference to Clear and Present Danger.
6	6	"Our Man in Sacramento"	Anu Valia	Karen Chee	November 21, 2024
The sudden passing of Florence sends shockwaves through Pacific View, prompting Charles to reflect on mortality and his late wife. He embarks on an emotional journey with his daughter, Emily, strengthening their bond. Meanwhile, Didi contemplates an intriguing corporate offer, weighing her commitment to the community against new opportunities and much better pay. The title is a reference to Our Man in Havana.
7	7	"From Russian Hill with Love"	Morgan Sackett	Lisa Muse Bryant	November 21, 2024
Charles and Calbert explore many of San Francisco's historic sites, discussing their pasts and futures, which deepens their friendship. Didi and Julie clash after Didi starts to figure out that Charles and Julie were not being truthful to her. On the ride back to Pacific View with Calbert, Charles figures out who stole the necklace. The title is a reference to From Russia with Love.
8	8	"The Spy Who Came in from the Cold"	Michael Schur	Dan Schofield	November 21, 2024
Charles and Didi approach Gladys in the Memory Care unit. Gladys has been taking the missing items, thinking they must be her own. When the residents hear why Charles was there, they are hurt and angry, especially Calbert. Emily assists Charles in confronting unresolved issues from his past, facilitating personal growth. Didi resigns her position after feeling guilty that she didn't recognize what Julie and Charles were doing there. However, Julie and Charles meet her at the coffee shop, and convince her to reconsider and stay. Charles goes back to Pacific View to help celebrate Virginia and Elliott's marriage, and all appears to be forgiven. Julie is given a mystery assignment from a mystery client, and calls Charles to tell him she needs his help again. Charles accepts whatever her next assignment will be. The title is a reference to the novel of the same name.

=== Season 2 (2025) ===
No. overall	No. in season	Title	Directed by	Written by	Original release date
9	1	"Orientation"	Michael Schur	Michael Schur	November 20, 2025
Charles begins working with Julie as a private investigator, taking on a series of small cases largely revolving around infidelity. They are approached by Wheeler College president Jack Berenger and provost Holly Bodgemark after Berenger's laptop is stolen. The laptop contains confidential documents that could scuttle a potential $400 million donation from billionaire Brad Vinick. A blackmail message is also sent warning that Berenger's secrets will be revealed if he accepts the money. Charles goes undercover as a professor to investigate. Later, the college prepares to unveil Vinick's portrait at a formal ceremony, but the painting is discovered missing and later found burned, accompanied by a handwritten note threatening the college if it accepts Vinick's donation. At the event, Charles meets Professor Mona Margadoff, and the two connect and slip away together. Mona later leaves abruptly, making her whereabouts unknown at the time the portrait is burned. Meanwhile, Julie helps Didi perform background checks on new hires at the retirement community, but Julie suspects an ulterior motive.
10	2	"Major Declaration"	Michael Schur	Dan Schofield	November 20, 2025
Julie and Charles investigate the threatening note, which leads them to Julie's estranged mother Vanessa, who was arrested and spent time in jail when Julie was young. She identifies that the pen used to write the note has a chipped nib. This points them toward Professor Elizabeth Muki, head of the fine arts department and painter of the portrait. Charles breaks into her office searching for the pen but finds nothing, and Muki is removed from suspicion due to her financial dependence on the Vinick donation. Later, Charles visits Calbert at Pacific View and tells him about Mona. Calbert warns Charles not to start a new relationship with any lies between them, which prompts Charles to tell Mona upfront that he's a private investigator, causing tension between him and Julie. Charles then realizes that because the ceremony was a cash bar, the pen might have been used to sign receipts. He searches the kitchen for the receipts but finds they have already been sent out. There, he encounters Professor Max Griffin acting strangely, making him a new suspect.
11	3	"Family Weekend"	Morgan Sackett	Karen Chee	November 20, 2025
At a faculty meeting, Holly announces an internal investigation into the portrait burning and reveals that Wheeler has hired Julie as the outside PI, hoping to limit damage and prevent Vinick from withdrawing his donation. Charles investigates Max, who later confesses he is a gambler short on money who had been searching the kitchen for leftover food. Charles also looks deeper into Mona's alibi, trying to confirm her claim that she was in the music room when the portrait burned. After failing to verify it, he brings in Emily for help, but she is also unsuccessful. Emily's son Jace gets the list but inadvertently reveals that Mona was in the music room while Mona is meeting Charles and Emily, leading to conflict before she and Charles reconcile. Julie and Holly speak to Vinick, but he provides no helpful information, using their meeting to sound out ideas for alternative means of commemoration following the burning of his portrait. Soon after, a leaked email reveals Berenger's personal stake in the donation deal, showing the blackmailer is following through.
12	4	"Spirit Week"	Morgan Sackett	Megan Amram	November 20, 2025
Three weeks after the previous leak, another email surfaces exposing Berenger's large salary and bonuses tied to corporate sponsorships. During a meeting with Berenger, a new suspect emerges: Claire Chung, a student who had worked as a waiter at the event. The investigation reveals that the anonymous emails come from "Wheeler Guardian," but nothing more is known. Charles hires Claire as a research assistant to keep a closer eye on her. Claire later tells Charles she may have to drop out because Berenger removed an income-based financial aid policy that supported her. Julie interviews various professors, all of whom dislike Berenger but provide no useful leads. Holly reveals that Berenger was hired over Dr. Ben Cole, an English professor at Wheeler and a close friend of hers; while Julie is initially suspicious, Holly shows her footage of Ben's nomination speech, revealing that he did not expect to be selected as President and using it to protest. Julie repeatedly messages the Wheeler Guardian and eventually receives a reply stating they know who she is. During a campus festival, Berenger is splattered with mud during a speech. They advise Berenger to apologize publicly, reinstate the aid policy, and return his bonuses. He follows through, Claire remains enrolled, and Charles deduces that Claire's roommate Hayley was responsible for the mud-throwing but chooses not to report her. In between the events, Charles is repeatedly asked a riddle regarding Wheeler's origins, and would get glitter in the face if he gave a wrong answer.
13	5	"Thanksgiving Break"	Heather Jack	Matt Murray and Michael Schur	November 20, 2025
It is Thanksgiving, and Charles is hosting his children and grandchildren, along with Calbert and Mona. Julie calls Charles for help because she has invited her mother but cannot handle preparations. Mona insists they join Charles' gathering, and they do. Didi, who drops off Calbert, is also invited and informs Charles that Calbert needs convincing for a hip replacement. Emily, who traditionally makes her mother's special pie, arrives without one after deciding not to bake it, only to realize Charles expected it prompting her to scramble to acquire a replacement. At dinner, Julie humiliates Vanessa by forcing her to reveal why she became estranged. Later, Charles becomes upset with Mona for neglecting her assigned tasks, which contributed to the chaotic evening. By the end of the night, the group reconciles.
14	6	"Extracurriculars"	Rebecca Asher	Hayley Frazier & Emalee Burditt	November 20, 2025
Running out of suspects within the college, Charles and Julie consider whether the crime may have been motivated by personal betrayal, suspecting Vinick's younger wife Kelseigh if she had learned he was cheating. At a staff meeting, Holly announces budget cuts and a new symposium led by Dr. Cole, which is effectively a party. Julie attends Kelseigh's new gallery show to learn more. Kelseigh reveals she is pregnant and is tracking Brad's phone because she believes he is cheating with someone named "Aurora." The phone's location pings on campus, and Charles, who is nearby, investigates. He sees Professor Andrea Yi exiting Vinick's car and tries to follow her but drunkenly falls into a body of water. Julie arrives and confronts Andrea, who explains that "Aurora" is not a person but a strategic plan intended to drastically reshape Wheeler College.
15	7	"Group Project"	Dean Holland	Janet Leahy & Alex Farber	November 20, 2025
Charles and Julie tell Holly that Aurora threatens numerous jobs and that the laptop theft may have been an attempt to delay the deal. To learn more about the plan, they attempt to steal Vinick's phone during a reunion party. Charles recruits the residents of Pacific View—Calbert, Virginia, and Elliot, as well as Mona and Julie's assistant Megan. The team's carefully constructed plan immediately begins to unravel, forcing them to improvise. Julie calls Vanessa for help, and after a series of distractions, they swap Vinick's phone. Mona stalls Vinick by performing a song until the data transfer completes. As they prepare to leave, Vanessa realizes she accidentally left one of her fake nails in Vinick's pocket. As he approaches her, Calbert attempts a staged fall but ends up injuring his hip for real, prompting him to eventually agree to undergo the hip replacement surgery he had been resisting. Julie apologizes to Vanessa, who's upset that after years of estrangement and staying away from crime, Julie called her in because she needed a pickpocket. They begin to properly reconcile. After reviewing the Aurora files, Julie, Charles, and Megan discover the plan is a hostile takeover of Wheeler College, eliminating most liberal arts departments and retaining only a few science and technology programs. They realize many individuals had something to lose, but Charles identifies one person with the most at stake.
16	8	"Final Exams"	Rebecca Asher	Lisa Muse Bryant	November 20, 2025
Julie and Charles accuse Berenger of sabotage, believing that Berenger tried to blow up the deal since Vinick's aggressive cost-cutting measures would have led to a faculty revolt and bad press. The pair deduce that Berenger had been discreetly pursuing the presidency of a different college, and that the potential fallout from Vinick's deal would prevent him from getting the other job. Berenger admits that he would be leaving Wheeler, but denies any sabotage when Dr. Ben Cole interrupts the meeting to abruptly confess. Cole admits he acted alone to stop the Aurora deal after overhearing Vinick's plans. He then returns the laptop and resigns. The board, outraged at being misled, rejects Vinick's donation, and Vinick's wife Kelseigh files for divorce. In the aftermath, Berenger leaves to become president of a university in Texas; Calbert undergoes surgery and starts a new relationship; Emily quits her job to pursue a master's degree and her dream of becoming a therapist; Julie makes up with Didi, arranging to get a drink sometime; and Charles is officially instated as a private investigator. Mona moves to Zagreb to teach music, and asks Charles to move with her. After initially agreeing, Charles eventually decides not to join her. Later on, Charles confronts Holly, and deduces that multiple professors were involved in the plot, but that Holly wrote the threatening note, recognizing the distinct marks from her chipped pen, and that Ben took the fall for Holly. Holly admits she orchestrated the entire operation to save the college. Charles advises Holly to move on and chooses not to expose her, then enlists Didi to help Ben, now lonely after leaving Wheeler, to move into Pacific View.

== Reception ==
=== Critical response ===
Critical response of A Man on the Inside
Season	Rotten Tomatoes	Metacritic
1	96% (51 reviews)	75 (23 reviews)
2	92% (25 reviews)	71 (12 reviews)

==== Season 1 ====
The review aggregator website Rotten Tomatoes reported a 96% approval rating for the first season, based on 51 critic reviews. The website's critics consensus reads, "Tailor-made to suit Ted Danson's estimable strengths, this warm and witty sitcom discovers a lot of life left in those who've been put out to pasture." Metacritic, which uses a weighted average, assigned a score of 75 out of 100 based on 23 critics, indicating "generally favorable" reviews.

Ben Travers of IndieWire gave the series an A− and said, "It's a tremendous performance made to look effortless, much like A Man on the Inside is a sage, ambitious new series made to be painlessly, pleasantly enjoyed." Reviewing the series for Chicago Sun-Times, Richard Roeper gave a rating of 3.5/4 and wrote, "A Man on the Inside moves at a breezy clip, but still finds room to flesh out a number of subplots and supporting players."

==== Season 2 ====
The second season has a 92% approval rating on Rotten Tomatoes, based on 25 critic reviews. The website's critics consensus states, "Led by producer Michael Schur's assured hand and the always entertaining Ted Danson, A Man on the Inside maintains its groove in this second season." On Metacritic, the second season received a score of 71 out of 100 based on 10 critics, indicating "generally favorable" reviews.

=== Accolades ===
For its first season, it was recognized as one of the top 10 television programs of 2024 by American Film Institute. Ted Danson was nominated for a Golden Globe Award for Best Actor – Television Series Musical or Comedy and a Screen Actors Guild Award for Outstanding Actor in a Comedy Series for the first season.

For its second season, Ted Danson was nominated for Best Actor in a Comedy Series at the Critics' Choice Awards.
