= SHARK Sport Watch =

Youthful Sports Watch

SHARK Sport Watch is a sports watch brand founded in 1997 that targets the younger generation.

== History ==
The brand was founded in 1997 by a group of fashion designers. The brand initially was known for its packaging, appearance and materials used. However, after 2010, SHARK Sport Watch innovated its accessories.

In October 2015, SHARK Sport Watch was authorized by Warner Bros. to design and produce 4 watches for Batman v Superman: Dawn of Justice in China.

== Prototypes ==
SHARK undergoes two stages of prototyping including movement, hands, casing as well as other components. The development phase leads to further tests, such as physical impact, thermal variations and rate regularity apart from tests that simulate wear and tear. The stresses put on these prototypes are above normal for the purpose of testing and have been subject to academic research.

== See also ==
- Modify Watches
- Parnis Watches
- Carlo Ferrara
