= Shaun Brown (actor) =

American television and film actor

- Born: January 19, 1987 (age 38); March Air Force Base, California, U.S.
- Occupation: Actor
- Years active: 2008–present
- Website: http://www.shaunbrown.net/

Shaun Brown (born January 19, 1987) is an American television and film actor known for his role on the TV series The Great Indoors. He was active in musical theater in high school and college at the University of Miami before doing music videos and choreography for a hip hop dance crew. He shifted to television roles in 2011 and has recently begun acting in motion pictures.

== Filmography ==
=== Film ===
- Heart, Baby (2017) - Bug
- Wilson (2017)
- Hooking Up - Franklin
- Idiotka (2025) - Malcolm

=== Television ===
Year	Title	Role	Notes
2012	Switched at Birth	Matthew	Episode: "This Is the Color of My Dreams"
2013	True Blood	Bruce	2 episodes
2013	The First Family	Jimmy	3 episodes
2013	The Newsroom	Zach	2 episodes
2014	Rizzoli & Isles	Max	Episode: "Judge, Jury and Executioner"
2014	Glee	Theatre Patron	Episode: "Opening Night"
2014	Nicky, Ricky, Dicky & Dawn	Kenny	Episode: "Pilot"
2015	Grimm	Paul	Episode: "Death Do Us Part"
2015	Fresh Off the Boat	Grocery Clerk	Episode: "Fajita Man"
2016	School of Rock	Golden Statue Guy	Episode: "Money (That's What I Want)"
2016	Party Girl	Jim	3 episodes
2016–2017	The Great Indoors	Mason	Main role, 22 episodes
2017	Hell's Kitchen	Himself	
2018	Grace and Frankie	Josh	2 episodes
2018	The Joel McHale Show with Joel McHale	Kevin	Episode: "Pink"
2019	Future Man	Hatchet	Recurring role, 7 episodes
2020	Into the Dark	Nick	Episode: "My Valentine"
2020	Run	Ryan Everwood	2 episodes
2020	Heart Baby Eggplant	Hot Date	Episode: "Cockblocked"
2021	Dave	Director	Episode: "Somebody Date Me"
2021	Dear White People	Keith	Episode: "Volume 4: Chapter IX"
2022	The Dropout	Daniel Young	3 episodes
2022	Dahmer – Monster: The Jeffrey Dahmer Story	Tracy Edwards	3 episodes
2022	American Gigolo	Chris Shannonhouse	2 episodes
