= Lilah Richcreek Estrada =

American actress

- Occupation: Actress
- Television: Chicago Med; A Man on the Inside
- Spouse: Robbie Silverman (m. 2018)
- Children: 1

Lilah Richcreek Estrada (also billed as Lilah Richcreek) is an American actress best known for playing private investigator Julie Kovalenko in the comedy series A Man on the Inside and Dr. Nellie Cuevas on the medical drama Chicago Med.

== Early life and career ==
Estrada was born in Los Angeles County, California. She began acting in 2009, largely appearing in shorts and television episodes. In 2022, Estrada was cast in her breakout role as psychiatric fellow Dr. Nellie Cuevas in the NBC medical drama series Chicago Med. In 2024, Estrada was announced as a cast member in the Netflix comedy series A Man on the Inside, starring as private investigator Julie Kovalenko. She continued playing the role of Julie in season two of the series.

== Personal life ==
On September 3, 2018, Estrada married actor Robbie Silverman. Their son was born in early 2025.

== Filmography ==
=== Television ===
Year	Title	Role	Notes
2012	Criminal Minds	Julie Harmon	Episode: "A Family Affair"
2013	2 Broke Girls	Kacee	Episode: "And Just Plane Magic"
2013	Two and a Half Men	Keri	Episode: "Nangnangnangnang"
2015	Cougar Town	Hostess Kim	Episode: "Waiting for Tonight"
2016	The Great Indoors	Maybelle	Episode: "@emma"
2017	Grace and Frankie	Cecilia	Episode: "The Art Show"
2017	Pilot Season	Salivay Morrisette	Episode: Episode 1
2017	Man with a Plan	Zara	Episode: "Battle of the Sexists"
2020	Dave	Julie	Episode: "Ally's Toast"
2022	The Wonder Years	Wendy	Episode: "Jobs and Hangouts"
2022–2025	Chicago Med	Dr. Nellie Cuevas	Main role (season 8), guest role (season 9–10)
2024–present	A Man on the Inside	Julie Kovalenko	Main role
