= The Great Indoors (TV series) =

American television sitcom

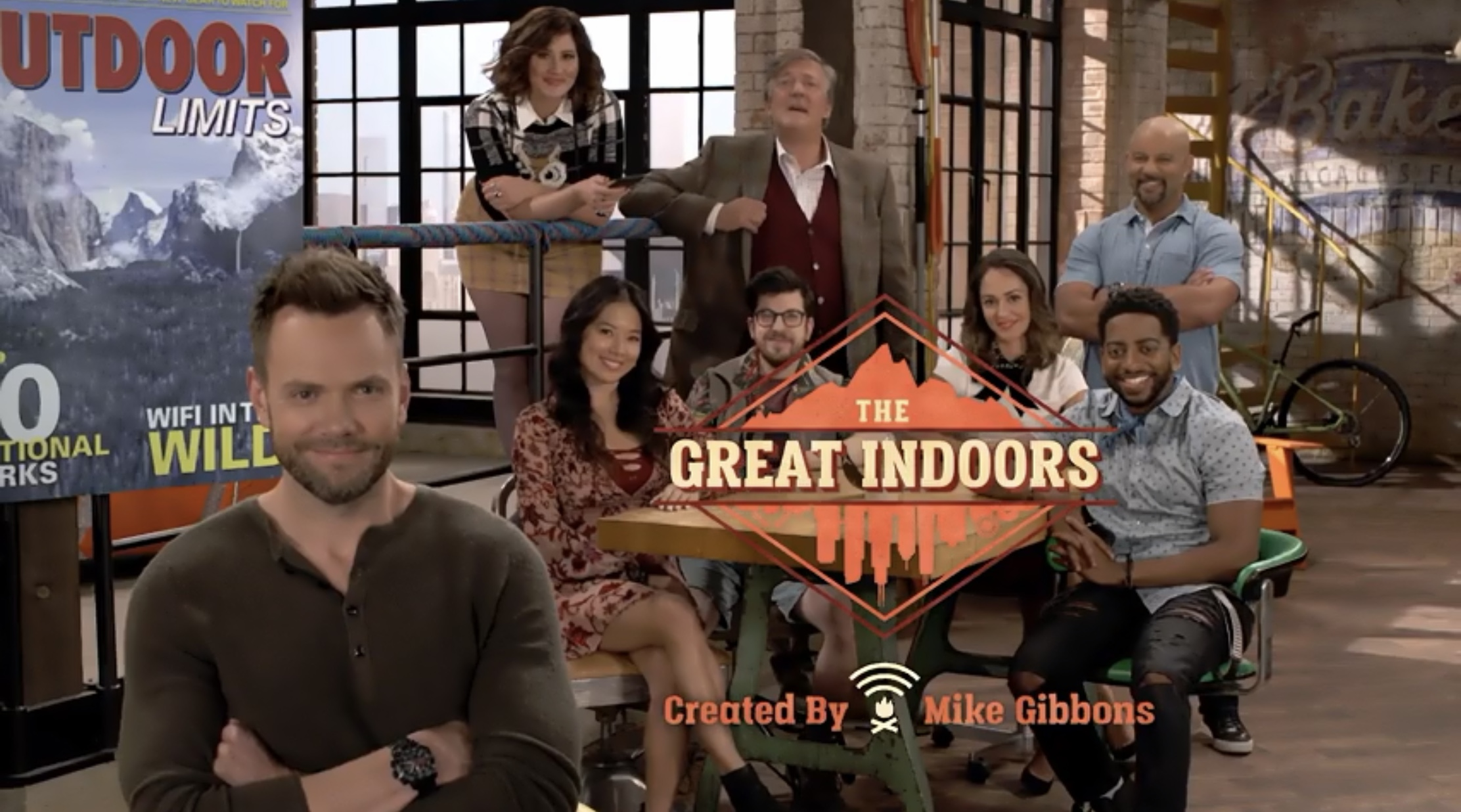
- Genre: Sitcom
- Created by: Mike Gibbons
- Directed by: Andy Ackerman
- Starring: Joel McHale; Christopher Mintz-Plasse; Chris Williams; Susannah Fielding; Christine Ko; Shaun Brown; Stephen Fry
- Composers: Ben Hoffman; Scott Hoffman
- Country of origin: United States
- Original language: English
- No. of seasons: 1
- No. of episodes: 22

Production
- Executive producers: Chris Harris; Mike Gibbons; Andy Ackerman; Judd Pillot; John Peaslee
- Producers: Brad Stevens; Boyd Vico
- Cinematography: Patti Lee
- Editor: Stephen Prime
- Camera setup: Multi-camera
- Running time: 22 minutes
- Production companies: Gibbons Bros.; Shiny Brass Lamp Productions; CBS Television Studios

Original release
- Network: CBS
- Release: October 27, 2016 – May 8, 2017

The Great Indoors is an American sitcom television series created by Mike Gibbons, starring Joel McHale that aired on CBS from October 27, 2016 to May 8, 2017. The series is produced by Gibbons Bros. and Shiny Brass Lamp Productions in association with CBS Television Studios, with Gibbons serving as showrunner.

== Premise ==
Jack Gordon has made a name for himself as an adventure reporter for the magazine Outdoor Limits. His days of exploring the world end when the magazine's founder, Roland, announces its move to web-only publishing and assigns Jack to its headquarters in Chicago to supervise the millennials who make up its online team.

== Themes ==
The show explores a multigenerational workforce and the generation gaps arising among the tech-savvy Millennial online team, their Gen X supervisor Jack (Joel McHale), and the magazine's baby boomer publisher Roland (Stephen Fry).

== Cast ==
=== Main ===
- Joel McHale as Jack Gordon: a globe-trotting adventure reporter now in charge of his magazine's publishing department
- Susannah Fielding as Brooke: Roland's daughter and Jack's current boss with whom he previously had a one-night stand
- Christopher Mintz-Plasse as Clark Roberts: a tech nerd who idolizes Jack and knows everything about surviving unrealistic scenarios but has not been out of the city
- Chris Williams as Eddie: Jack's best friend, who runs the local bar and helps him understand his co-workers
- Christine Ko as Emma Cho: the social media expert who views Jack as the human version of dial-up Internet access
- Shaun Brown as Mason Trimmer: a bisexual hipster who has not spent any actual time outside
- Stephen Fry as Roland: an outdoorsman in his own right and founder of the magazine
- Deborah Baker Jr. as Esther: the quirky receptionist in the Outdoor Limits office

=== Recurring ===
- Andrew Leeds as Paul
- Maggie Lawson as Rachel

=== Guest ===
- Amy Hill as Carol
- Tricia O'Kelley as Monica
- Barry Bostwick as Mather
- Jon Cryer as Donnie
- Chris D'Elia as Aaron Wolf
- Brian Jordan Alvarez as Brian
- Essence Atkins as Denise
- Jane Leeves as Sheryl
- Caitlin McGee as Kaylie

== Episodes ==
No.	Title	Directed by	Written by	Original release date	U.S. viewers (millions)
1	"Pilot"	Andy Ackerman	Mike Gibbons	October 27, 2016	8.81
Jack Gordon, a field reporter who has traveled the world to write stories for Outdoor Limits magazine, learns that the publication has gone to an online-only format. He is asked to stay in the office and supervise a group of millennials who are well-versed in Web publishing but clueless about the outdoors. Jack soon learns that his former flame Brooke, also the magazine founder's daughter, made the request to move him into the new job.
2	"Dating Apps"	Andy Ackerman	John Blickstead & Trey Kollmer	November 3, 2016	8.06
Jack, who has never had a problem getting a date, finds the world of online dating apps to be considerably different than meeting women in the traditional manner.
3	"Step One: Shelter"	Andy Ackerman	Brad Stevens & Boyd Vico	November 10, 2016	7.69
As Jack struggles adjusting to his new life working exclusively indoors, Outdoor Limits is making budget cuts, and Brooke says they can't afford to have him living in posh hotels anymore. While Jack searches for a place to live, Clark kindly offers his tiny apartment as a place for his supervisor to crash. Meanwhile, Brooke is tired of being a "Bad Cop" all the time, and digs hard into Roland to help her father find his killer instinct.
4	"You Don't Know Jack"	Andy Ackerman	Damir Konjicija & Dario Konjicija	November 17, 2016	7.33
While helping Jack clean out his storage unit, the group finds an old answering machine with evidence that Jack once lived with a woman named Jessie. Jack admits he and Jessie were together for two years, and she broke his heart when he returned from an assignment and found her gone. As Emma helps Jack track down Jessie, Clark and Mason decide to use artifacts found in Jack's storage unit to throw a 90's party at Eddie's bar.
5	"No Bad Ideas"	Andy Ackerman	Austen Earl	November 24, 2016	5.14
Jack's critical attitude towards Clark's lackluster work ethic causes management to take action against him, forcing him to say only positive things about Clark. Meanwhile, Brooke chooses Emma and Mason to find a new intern that meets the company's ethnic diversity standards.
6	"Going Deep"	Andy Ackerman	Story by : Liz Feldman & Todd Linden; Teleplay by : Liz Feldman	December 1, 2016	6.83
Brooke accuses Jack of not being a supportive friend when he can't see how Eddie is hurting after learning his divorce is final. In her own life, Brooke learns her engagement registry at a department store has been cancelled after three-plus years, making her wonder if things with her fiancé Paul will ever progress. Elsewhere, Clark, Emma, and Mason have to wear fitness watches for a future article, and have a contest to see who can move the least. The heartbeat monitor on Clark's watch hints that he has a crush on Emma.
7	"@Emma"	Andy Ackerman	Isabelle Esposito	December 8, 2016	7.31
Jack and Brooke hold a meeting with Emma to scold her about her tardiness and work habits, causing Emma to quit. Jack and Roland try to take over Emma's role as social media manager, but fail badly. They then hire the seemingly qualified Maybelle (Lilah Richcreek) for the position, but that soon backfires. They finally have to plead with Emma to come back.
8	"Office Romance"	Andy Ackerman	Alex Edelman	December 15, 2016	8.11
Clark wants advice from Jack on how to get a date with Emma, but first Jack has to get HR to lift the ban on interoffice dating. Jack is successful, but he regrets it after he sleeps with Amy from the accounting department (Jessica Makinson) and determines she is too boring to continue seeing. In a twist, Jack now needs advice from Clark (who is used to being dumped) on how to break up with Amy easily.
9	"The Mediocre Outdoors"	Andy Ackerman	Joanna Lewis & Kristine Songco	January 5, 2017	9.46
When Clark, Emma, and Mason are tasked with testing a new line of camping products, Jack decides he needs to teach the inexperienced millennials about camping the way Roland taught him and Brooke: by leaving them to fend for themselves in the wilderness while he goes to a posh resort nearby. Brooke clashes with Jack and her father, insisting they need to make camping fun for the millennials because they aren't equipped to learn the way she and Jack did.
10	"The Explorers' Club"	Andy Ackerman	Craig Doyle	January 12, 2017	7.15
Jack takes the millennial staff to a meeting at the Chicago Adventure Society to hear Roland retell the mountain climbing tale that inspired Jack's career choice. But Roland is shunned when the club president (Barry Bostwick) reveals newly-discovered evidence that indicates Roland lied about details of the adventure. Meanwhile, a girl Emma is mentoring quits following her on Twitter, making Emma feel like she's already ceased to be relevant at age 26.
11	"Mason Blows Up"	Andy Ackerman	John Blickstead & Trey Kollmer	January 19, 2017	7.81
Jack is taking all the hardcore writing assignments for himself, and assigning soft stories to Mason and Clark. While pursuing one of his assignments, Mason stumbles upon an abducted tiger, leading to his story and catch phrase ("Y'busted!") blowing up on social media. Feeling challenged, Jack works all night on one of his stories which also becomes a hit, but gets angry when Roland suggests that the red-hot Mason represent it for the magazine. Meanwhile, Clark inadvertently pushes Emma and her new boyfriend closer together.
12	"Paul's Surprise"	Andy Ackerman	Mike Gibbons	February 9, 2017	7.43
Brooke introduces Jack to her fiancé Paul (Andrew Leeds), and they ask Jack if he will read Roland's speech at their re-engagement party because Roland can't be there. Jack does so, but he ad-libs several insulting jokes about Paul, making his co-workers question if he has feelings for Brooke. Meanwhile, Clark, Emma and Mason argue over which of their three positions has leadership over the others.
13	"DTR"	Andy Ackerman	Austen Earl	February 16, 2017	8.01
After Jack meets blind date Rachel (Maggie Lawson) at the bar and gives the old "not looking for a commitment" speech, the two mutually agree to end things before they start. Jack then meets a hard-partying millennial named Kaylie (Caitlin McGee) and starts going out with her, but can't keep up. Clark, Emma and Mason try to give Jack advice, but it is no use. Jack then contacts Rachel and the two try again.
14	"Friends Like These"	Andy Ackerman	Joanna Lewis & Kristine Songco	February 23, 2017	7.29
After Jack has a meal with Rachel and some of her friends, she says she'd like to meet his friends. Other than Eddie, whom Rachel already knows, Jack realizes his old friends are either still out seeking adventures or have died in related accidents. With nowhere else to turn, he throws a party so that Rachel can meet the Outdoor Limits staff, before realizing these really are his friends now.
15	"Relationship Jack"	Andy Ackerman	Brad Stevens & Boyd Vico	March 9, 2017	7.02
When Jack spends an entire weekend cuddling with Rachel, blowing off a key assignment for the magazine's biggest issue of the year, Eddie, Roland and Brooke all fear that "Relationship Jack" has returned, having seen this version of him before. With an "alpha male" void in the office, Clark steps up and assumes Jack's role and persona, making the women in the office see him in a different light.
16	"Aaron Wolf"	Andy Ackerman	Craig Doyle	March 27, 2017	4.12
Jack is forced to work with his rival Aaron Wolf (Chris D'Elia), after Roland hires him as a consultant. Everyone in the office but Clark seems to be wowed by Aaron's style and ideas, but Jack warns he is all flash and no substance.
17	"Cubicles"	Andy Ackerman	John Blickstead & Trey Kollmer	March 30, 2017	6.82
Jack says he needs his own office to avoid the random chatter from the millennials, so Brooke has cubicles installed. When this fails to give Jack the privacy he desires, he cajoles Brooke into giving her office to him. Later, Rachel announces she has a great job opportunity with the Toronto Raptors, and she and Jack mutually agree to part ways. Suddenly, Jack realizes he'd like to talk about it with his office friends.
18	"Party Paul"	Andy Ackerman	Damir Konjicija & Dario Konjicija	April 6, 2017	6.97
Brooke's fiancé Paul is struggling to bond with his future father-in-law Roland, so Jack takes Roland and Paul out drinking with the aim of getting them closer together. The drunken Paul disappears and gets lost in Chicago, so Emma uses her hacking skills to track him down.
19	"Ricky Leaks"	Andy Ackerman	Jen Howell & Greg Trimmer	April 13, 2017	6.33
Ricky (Rory Scovel), the office I.T. guy, plots his revenge after being fired, threatening to reveal the staff's damaging and embarrassing emails.
20	"The Heartbreaker"	Andy Ackerman	Alex Edelman & Isabelle Esposito	April 27, 2017	6.38
Clark faces a dilemma when Emma says she wants to break up with her boyfriend, Greg, as Clark likes Greg and doesn't want to lose him as a friend. Meanwhile, Jack goes on a mission to find female companionship for Eddie, who still can't get over his ex-wife Denise (Essence Atkins), but it turns into an awkward double-date with Brooke and Paul.
21	"Roland's Secret"	Andy Ackerman	Liz Feldman	May 1, 2017	4.12
Roland reveals to Jack that he secretly wed Cheryl (Jane Leeves) and he wants Jack to figure out a way to break the news to Brooke. Brooke and Paul prepare for pre-marriage counseling, but can't even agree on a counselor. Meanwhile, Clark is happy to learn that Emma called in sick, because it gives him an excuse to visit her and bring her soup.
22	"The Company Retreat"	Andy Ackerman	Mike Gibbons, Brad Stevens & Boyd Vico	May 8, 2017	3.91
At a company retreat in the woods, Clark plots to finally reveal his true feelings to Emma. After Clark decorates a cabin with her favorite things, Greg shows up. Clark tells Greg how much he loves Emma and says he will fight for her. Emma walks in, having overheard the conversation, and gives Clark a passionate kiss. Later, Jack and Brooke are alone in the same cabin where they once hooked up, but nothing more happens. Jack instead calls Paul and tells him he needs to fight for Brooke like Clark fought for Emma. Meanwhile, Roland has been offered an exclusive opportunity to go back to the field and study a mysterious tribe in the Amazon for three months. Seeing how much Roland will miss Cheryl, Jack steps up and offers to go in his place.

== Production ==
On January 29, 2016, CBS placed a pilot order, under the title The Great Indoors. The pilot was written by Mike Gibbons and directed by Andy Ackerman. On March 14, 2016, Chris Harris provided to join as the showrunner and EP of this pilot series. On May 13, 2016, CBS placed a series order.

The series premiered in the 2016–17 United States network television schedule and aired at 8:30 pm. Almost a month later on November 14, 2016, it was picked up for a full season of 19 episodes. On January 6, 2017, an additional 3 episodes were added, making it a 22 episode season.

On May 13, 2017, CBS canceled the show after one season.

== Reception ==
The Great Indoors has received generally mixed reviews from television critics. Review aggregator website Rotten Tomatoes reported an approval rating of 45% based on 29 reviews, with an average rating of 5.1/10. The site's critical consensus reads, "The Great Indoors serves up one repetitive, formulaic joke, though the cast performs respectably within the significant constraints of the material." Metacritic reported a score of 51 out of 100, based on 27 critics, indicating "mixed or average reviews".

The show attracted criticism for portraying millennials as more easily offended and more sensitive than older generations.

== Home media ==
The complete series of The Great Indoors was released on DVD on November 28, 2018, via Amazon.
