= Echo Boomers (film) =

2020 American crime drama film

- Film poster
- Directed by: Seth Savoy
- Written by: Seth Savoy; Kevin Bernhardt; Jason Miller
- Produced by: James Langer; Mike D. Ware; Matthew G. Zamias; Kelly Mi Li; Lucas Jarach; Byron Wetzel; Sean Kaplan
- Starring: Patrick Schwarzenegger; Alex Pettyfer; Michael Shannon
- Cinematography: Carlos Veron
- Edited by: Dean Gonzalez; Ken O'Keefe
- Production companies: Speakeasy; Organic Media Group; Wetzel Entertainment Group; Foton Pictures; Dark Dreams Entertainment
- Distributed by: Saban Films
- Release date: November 13, 2020
- Running time: 94 minutes
- Country: United States
- Language: English

Echo Boomers is a 2020 American crime drama film directed by Seth Savoy and starring Patrick Schwarzenegger, Alex Pettyfer, and Michael Shannon. It is Savoy's feature directorial debut.

== Plot ==
In the midst of financial crisis, a recent college graduate Lance Zutterland, who leaves school in debt, decides to join with other college graduates – Ellis, Jack, Stewart, Chandler, and Allie – in stealing valuable paintings owned by Chicago's richest for themselves, under the supervision of Mel Donnelly. During the heist, the group express their anger by wrecking anything valuable, but Mel will only pay them if they deliver the stolen paintings intact. Lance bonds with Ellis's girlfriend Allie and they become friends but upon bringing Allie home to their apartment, Ellis intimidates Lance into staying away from her.

They buy expensive business attire and pretend to be accountants so they can interview upper class clients and trick them into giving them their addresses. In one of their heists, Chandler inadvertently reveals his face to the realtor and his facial composite is released to the public. When Ellis leaves the table for a minute, Jack plugs Ellis's phone into his laptop to copy the images, where they see the house of Daniel Wardlaw. The group realize that Wardlaw's house has a vault and they agree to rob his house.

Mel summons the group and introduces his new henchmen, threatening to go after them if anyone snitches him. Later, they go to a nightclub where Allie loses consciousness after an overdose of cocaine. They bring Allie to the hospital, but knowing that bringing her in may lead to their arrest, Stewart kicks her out. Lance reluctantly helps her despite the group's objections and stays by her side for the night.

On their way to Wardlaw's, Lance argues with Stewart over his recklessness. Arriving there, Jack ties Wardlaw up and Stewart and Chandler take most of the money from the vault. Angry over their negligence to Allie, Lance locks them up in the vault and drives away with Jack and the bags of money. They arrive at Ellis's apartment to get Allie, who refuses to go with Jack after being persuaded by Ellis to be with him. Me and the rest of the group are subsequently arrested and are sentenced to various years.

Lance and Jack hide at a motel in Nebraska where they stay the night. The next morning, Lance wakes up to find Jack and the van gone. With nowhere else to go and penniless, he turns himself in to the police.

== Cast ==
- Patrick Schwarzenegger as Lance Zutterland
- Michael Shannon as Mel Donnelly
- Alex Pettyfer as Ellis Beck
- Lesley Ann Warren as Author
- Hayley Law as Allie Tucker
- Gilles Geary as Jack
- Oliver Cooper as Stewart
- Jacob Alexander as Chandler Gaines
- Kate Linder as Kathy Tucker

== Production ==
=== Development ===
Seth Savoy began writing the script back in 2013 after he graduated from school in Chicago, Savoy had read about a group of college kids robbing the rich, and destroying what they didn’t want.

=== Casting ===
Early in development, Nick Robinson and Britt Robertson were previously attached to star in the film.

== Release ==
In September 2020, it was announced that Saban Films acquired the film's North American distribution rights.

The film was released in theaters, VOD and digital platforms on November 13, 2020.

== Reception ==
The film opened to mostly negative reviews by critics while audiences gave it most positive. The film has a 36% rating by the critics on Rotten Tomatoes and a 90%+ by audiences. The Chicago Tribune awarded the film 3/4 stars. Jeffrey M. Anderson of Common Sense Media awarded the film two stars out of five.
