= Stan Against Evil =

- Genre: Comedy horror
- Created by: Dana Gould
- Starring: John C. McGinley; Janet Varney; Nate Mooney; Deborah Baker Jr.
- Country of origin: United States
- Original language: English
- No. of seasons: 3
- No. of episodes: 24

Production
- Executive producers: Dana Gould; Tom Lassally; Frank Scherma; Justin Wilkes
- Producers: Ed Tapia; John C. McGinley
- Running time: 22 minutes
- Production companies: 3 Arts Entertainment; RadicalMedia

Original release
- Network: IFC
- Release: October 31, 2016 – November 21, 2018

Stan Against Evil is an American comedy horror television series created by Dana Gould. The series stars John C. McGinley, Janet Varney, Nate Mooney, and Deborah Baker Jr. The series premiered on IFC on October 31, 2016. A second season aired during November 2017 and a third in October and November 2018. On January 25, 2019, Gould announced IFC had cancelled the series.

== Premise ==
A New Hampshire town built on the site of a massive witch burning is haunted by demons, spirits, and witches, that all hate the authorities responsible for their demise, and those of their ilk. Stan Miller, the crotchety former sheriff, teams up with his replacement, Evie Barrett, to defend the town from the supernatural.

== Cast and characters ==
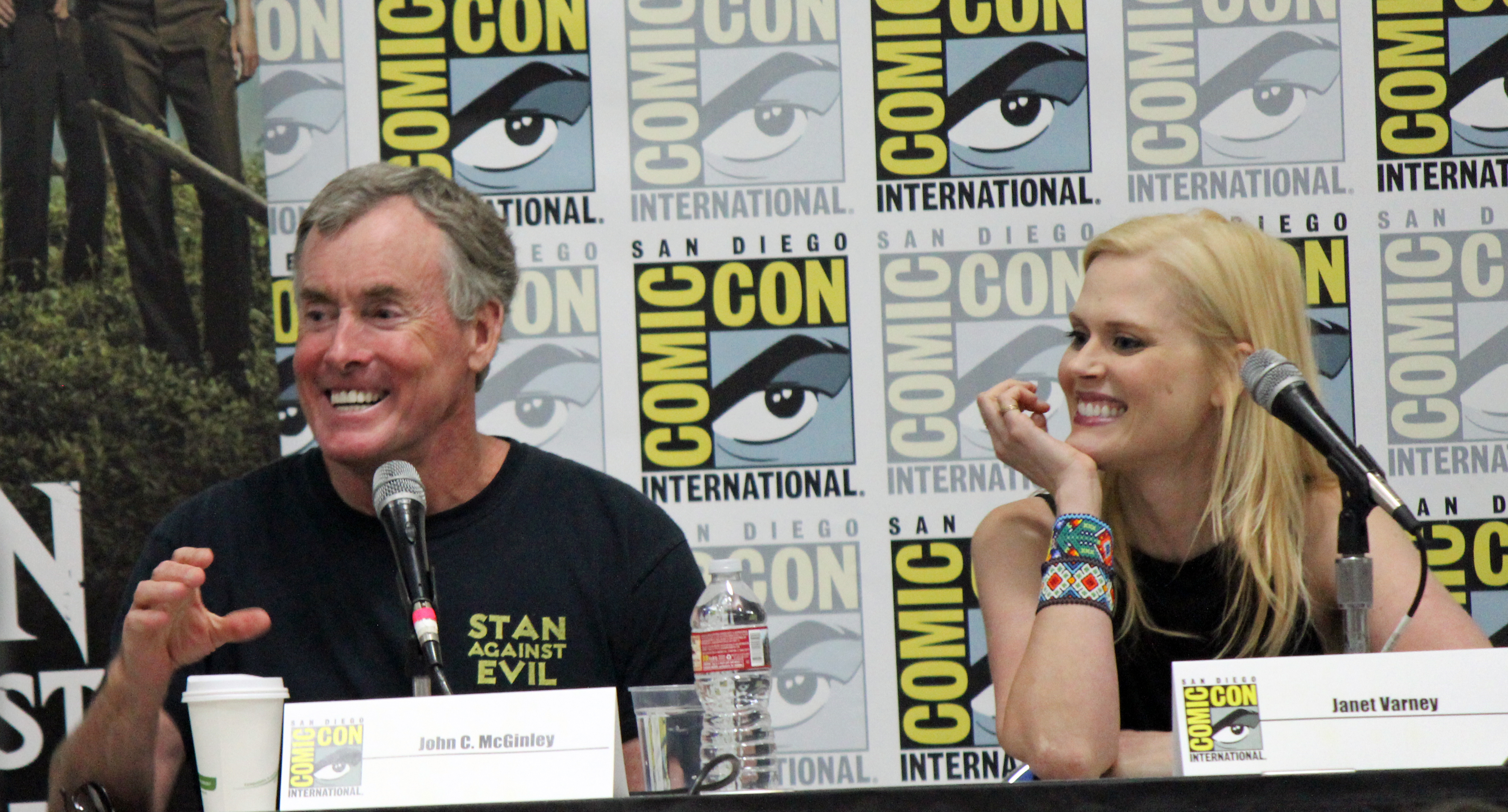
McGinley and Varney at a panel for Stan Against Evil at the 2017 Comic-Con International

=== Main ===
- John C. McGinley as Stanley Miller, the former sheriff who is forced to resign after a violent outburst at his wife's funeral
- Janet Varney as Evie Barret, the new sheriff of the town and a single mom
- Nate Mooney as Deputy Leon Drinkwater
- Deborah Baker Jr. as Denise Miller, Stan's daughter

=== Recurring ===
- Morgana Ignis as Stella Stanas, The Baphomet, Ida Putnam, Haurus, Aged Priscilla
- Danielle Phelan as Karen
- Denise Boutte as Lara Bouchard
- Dana Gould as Kevin Cougar Mellencamp (no relation), the gravedigger
- Randall Newsome as Constable Eccles
- Grace DeAmicis as Grace, Evie's daughter

== Episodes ==
Season	Episodes	Originally released	
Season	Episodes	First released	Last released
1	8	October 31, 2016	November 23, 2016
2	8	November 1, 2017	November 22, 2017
3	8	October 31, 2018	November 21, 2018

=== Season 1 (2016) ===
No. overall	No. in season	Title	Directed by	Written by	Original release date	Prod. code	US viewers (millions)
1	1	"Dig Me Up, Dig Me Down"	Justin Nijm & Jack Bishop	Dana Gould	October 31, 2016	101	0.181
An aging police sheriff who has recently lost his position due to an angry outburst begrudgingly joins an alliance with new sheriff, Evie Barret to battle angry demons haunting their small New Hampshire town.
2	2	"Know, Know, Know Your Goat"	Justin Nijm & Jack Bishop	Dana Gould	November 2, 2016	102	0.143
Stan's daughter Denise goes blueberry picking and comes home with a pet goat that turns out to be The Baphomet, an ancient, goat-based demon who wants both Stan and Denise dead. All because someone wanted blueberries.
3	3	"Let Your Love Groan"	Justin Nijm & Jack Bishop	Jessica Conrad	November 9, 2016	103	0.213
Stan, Evie and Denise go speed dating and suddenly find themselves involved with their perfect match. Only they also find themselves growing weak and rapidly aging. Even Denise, whose perfect match was a pot-bellied pig named Murgatroyd.
4	4	"Life Orr Death"	Justin Nijm & Jack Bishop	Guy Busick & Ryan Murphy	November 9, 2016	104	0.220
Evie attempts to rescue Stan's prized possession, his Bobby Orr hockey stick, from the church donation pile, only to find herself transported into the spirit world where she too, is on trial for witchcraft.
5	5	"Ouija Bored"	Justin Nijm & Jack Bishop	Jessica Conrad	November 16, 2016	106	0.137
A strange crop of flowers starts growing in town and each bloom brings a new supernatural horror.
6	6	"I'm Gleaning My Coven"	Justin Nijm & Jack Bishop	Susan Burke	November 16, 2016	105	0.138
Denise gets mixed up with a group of goth kids who come to town hoping to contact a demon. Unfortunately, they succeed, and Denise finds herself possessed by the demon, creating a tricky situation for Stan.
7	7	"Spider Walk With Me"	Justin Nijm & Jack Bishop	Dana Gould & Sam Boyd	November 23, 2016	107	0.244
A stranger shows up at Stan's door asking to see his late wife's collection of mystical artifacts but Stan and the girls deny its existence. Once outside, he's attacked by a giant man-spider.
8	8	"Level Boss"	Justin Nijm & Jack Bishop	Jessica Conrad	November 23, 2016	108	0.212
A mysterious girl runs out into the street forcing Evie to swerve into a fatal car accident. Season Finale.

=== Season 2 (2017) ===
No. overall	No. in season	Title	Directed by	Written by	Original release date	Prod. code	US viewers (millions)
9	1	"Black Hat Society Part 1"	Justin Nijm & Jack Bishop	Dana Gould	November 1, 2017	201	0.152
Stan meets descendants of a Wiccan coven, the Black Hat Society.
10	2	"Black Hat Society Part 2"	Justin Nijm & Jack Bishop	Dana Gould	November 1, 2017	202	0.176
Stan can travel back in time to save Evie, but she will forever be a ghost unless they can get rid of someone else from the past.
11	3	"Curse of the Werepony"	Justin Nijm & Jack Bishop	Guy Busick & Ryan Murphy	November 8, 2017	203	0.155
Evie discovers having a horse can be deadly after her ex-husband buys a pony for their daughter. Guest starring David Koechner and Steven Ogg.
12	4	"Girls' Night"	Justin Nijm & Jack Bishop	Jessica Conrad	November 8, 2017	204	0.162
When the bachelor on a TV dating show hypnotizes Evie, and the same man bets on Stan's life, they all become prey to a murderous game of fate. Guest starring Jeffrey Combs.
13	5	"The Eyes of Evie Barret"	Robert Cohen	Bob Nickman	November 15, 2017	205	0.182
Evie buys an antique ring and starts dreaming of killing people who turn up dead. Leon also kills a dude.
14	6	"Hex Marks the Tot"	Robert Cohen	Susan Burke	November 15, 2017	206	0.181
Denise takes a nanny job for a demon baby who feeds off her affection. Kevin gets beaten up by a baby.
15	7	"Mirror Mirror"	Robert Cohen	Robert Cohen & Dana Gould	November 22, 2017	207	0.189
Stan summons a spirit to help him travel back in time to save Claire. In the process, an evil replica is created.
16	8	"A Hard Day's Night"	Robert Cohen	Jessica Conrad	November 22, 2017	208	0.173
Stan travels back in time to save Claire and he succeeds, but dies in the process, forcing Evie to go back and save him; Leon loses his head over a new girl.

=== Season 3 (2018) ===
No. overall	No. in season	Title	Directed by	Written by	Original release date	Prod. code	US viewers (millions)
17	1	"Hell Is What You Make It"	Robert Cohen	Dana Gould	October 31, 2018	301	N/A
After Evie is arrested for murder and committed to a psychiatric hospital, Stan tries to rescue her but everyone sees him as demon. Stan discovers a possible way to free the souls that were cursed by Constable Eccles. Guest starring Terrence C. Carson.
18	2	"The Hex Files"	Robert Cohen	Jessica Conrad	October 31, 2018	302	0.110
During an investigation of the Black Hat Society, two eerily familiar investigators arrive. Stan continues his search for the bigger evil ally that can defeat Constable Eccles.
19	3	"Larva My Life"	Robert Cohen	Dana Gould	November 7, 2018	303	0.101
A disgraced performer disrupts the peace in Willard's Mill. Evie's ex comes back to town and transforms into a caterpillar monster and terrorizes the town.
20	4	"Demon Who Came in From the Heat"	Robert Cohen	Guy Busick & Ryan Murphy	November 7, 2018	304	0.088
Willard's Mill is terrorized by a murderous hitchhiker. Stan befriends a demon and tries to find the spell that will free the souls captured by Constable Eccles. Guest starring Scott Adsit.
21	5	"Nubbin but Trouble"	Robert Cohen	Mike Mendez	November 14, 2018	305	0.147
An evil puppet murders an antique store owner and begins to summon spirits from hell. Stan's home brew has a debilitating side effect.
22	6	"Vampire Creek"	Robert Cohen	Kandice Martellaro	November 14, 2018	306	0.128
After Denise wins a fake contest, she becomes trapped in the fictional world of Vampire Creek. Stan, Evie and Kevin must rescue her before she is turned into a vampire.
23	7	"Intensive Scare Unit"	Robert Cohen	Dana Gould & Matt Weinhold	November 21, 2018	307	0.178
Stan goes for a prostate exam but must escape when the hospital turns demonic.
24	8	"Stan Against Evie"	Robert Cohen	Jessica Conrad	November 21, 2018	308	0.141
Haurus demands Stan kill Evie in return for killing Constable Eccles and ending the curse on Willard's Mill; another demon tells Stan how to defeat Haurus but the cost could be high.

== Production ==
On February 22, 2016, the series was picked up for an eight episode first season, which began filming in June 2016 in Atlanta, and premiered on October 31, 2016, on IFC. On December 13, 2016, IFC renewed the series for a second season, which premiered on November 1, 2017. In January 2018, it was announced that IFC had renewed the series for a third season. The third season premiered on October 31, 2018.

== Reception ==
On Rotten Tomatoes the first season has a 67% approval rating with an average rating of 5.24/10 based on 12 reviews. The site's critical consensus reads: "Stan Against Evil is a light, gruesome horror-comedy with a fun premise, but the series has yet to solidify its tone and characters." On Metacritic, the first season has a score of 57 out of 100, based on 8 critics, indicating "mixed or average reviews".
