= Backyard Sports: The Animated Special =

2026 animated special

- Official poster
- Based on: Backyard Sports
- Developed by: Joseph Purdy (co-developer)
- Written by: Joseph Purdy; Will McRobb (additional writing); Teddy McDonald (additional writing)
- Story by: Joseph Purdy; Christopher Waters
- Directed by: Mike Roberts
- Voices of: Ego Nwodim; Tiffany Haddish; Adam Pally; Utkarsh Ambudkar; Ashleigh Crystal Hairston; Christopher Mintz-Plasse; Donald Faison; Lindsay Barnett; Deborah Baker Jr.; Michael Vlamis; Arturo Castro
- Composers: Jonny Shorr; Henry Lunetta (additional score)
- Countries of origin: United States; Ireland
- Original languages: English; Spanish

Production
- Executive producers: Lindsay Barnett; Christopher Waters; Stuart Avi Savitski; Ari Pinchot
- Running time: 11 minutes
- Production companies: Playground Productions; Lighthouse Studios

Original release
- Network: YouTube
- Release: January 29, 2026

Related
- Backyard Sports: The Animated Series

Backyard Sports: The Animated Special is a 2026 animated special based on the Backyard Sports franchise (particularly the Backyard Baseball sub-series) produced by Playground Productions and Lighthouse Studios, with the latter providing animation. The special was written by Joe Purdy and directed by Mike Roberts. It stars the voices of Tiffany Haddish, Arturo Castro, Ego Nwodim, Christopher Mintz-Plasse, Donald Faison, Ashleigh Crystal Hairston, Adam Pally, and Utkarsh Ambudkar. It is the franchise's second animated production after the live-action/animated NFL Backyard Basics: Football Tips from the Pros (2002) and the first original major production in the Backyard Sports franchise since Playground Productions rebooted the franchise in 2024.

The special premiered at Dave & Buster's locations on January 24, 2026, with a premiere screening at the chain's Hollywood Boulevard location in Los Angeles, and was released to YouTube on January 29. (Note: Backyard Sports [@backyardsportsofficial]; (January 20, 2026). "The official poster for Backyard Sports: The Animated Special - Coming to our YouTube channel January 29th! Trailer on Thursday 😎 #backyardsports #animation #pablosanchez #youtube" – via Instagram.) The special later received a Prime Video release in select territories on March 27, 2026.

The special would ultimately serve as a backdoor pilot to an animated series, Backyard Sports: The Animated Series, which was announced at San Diego Comic-Con on July 24, 2026.

== Plot ==
Stephanie Morgan, a baseball-loving girl, prepares for the first game of the Backyard Baseball League season along with her teammates, Achmed Khan, Kiesha Phillips, Pete Wheeler, and Pablo Sanchez. During batting practice, Stephanie accidentally spits out her "lucky" bubblegum; believing that she is unable to play baseball without it, Stephanie, Achmed, Kiesha, and Pete rush over to the Backyard Sports clubhouse to find another pack of gum, but they are unable to find any there. Per the advice of their nerdy friend Dmitri Petrovich, Stephanie and her friends embark around town in search of a snack cart, where she can buy some more gum.

The group chase the snack cart all the way to a pizza parlor called Nick's Pizza, where it is revealed that all of the cart's remaining gum was bought by the Webber twins, Ashley and Sidney. Tony Delvecchio, a worker at Nick's Pizza, offers a pack of gum to Stephanie as a prize if she wins at a Skee-Ball game. Despite her best efforts, Stephanie fails the challenge, causing her to give up hope.

Back at the clubhouse, Dmitri works on making a bubblegum replica for Stephanie, but while testing it out, he ends up blowing a giant bubble that causes him to float into the sky. Stephanie and the others discover Dmitri's predicament and decide to rescue him. Putting her insecurities aside, Stephanie hits a baseball that flies up and pops the bubble, while Dmitri is caught by Pablo, who had found the snack cart that the others were trying to catch up to. Having regained her confidence, Stephanie finally begins playing ball with the team.

That night, Pete, who is hanging from a fence after having gotten his pants caught on it earlier, discovers that he had a pack of bubblegum in his pocket, making Stephanie's whole journey all the more pointless.

== Voice cast ==
- Ego Nwodim as Stephanie Morgan (nicknamed "Bubbles"), an African American girl who is a major baseball enthusiast. As the protagonist of the special, her spitting out her bubblegum before the game is what drives the special's plot.
- Tiffany Haddish as Kiesha Phillips (nicknamed "Flash"), a jovial African American girl and Stephanie's best friend.
- Adam Pally as:
  - Pete Wheeler (nicknamed "Wheelie"), a fast but slow-witted Caucasian boy. His portrayal in the special defers from his typical portrayal in the games by speaking normally instead of with a simpleton-sounding voice and having a sense of sarcasm. Regarding the changes, executive producer Chris Waters explained that the production team wanted to better differentiate him from fellow Southern-accented Backyard Kid Marky Dubois and that they wanted Pete's portrayal to be less "tropey", as his portrayal in the original Humongous games would not be seen as acceptable in the present day.
  - A video game announcer whose voice is heard in splash screens showing Stephanie facing sadder versions of herself.
- Utkarsh Ambudkar as Achmed Khan (nicknamed "the Axeman"), a Pakistani American boy who loves rock music and carries a boombox around with him.
- Ashleigh Crystal Hairston as:
  - Sunny Day, an African American girl who is the enthusiastic main commentator of the Backyard Baseball League.
  - Jocinda Smith, an athletic African American girl that Stephanie and company meetup at the Playground Commons basketball court.
- Chris Mintz-Plasse as Dmitri Petrovich, an intelligent Caucasian boy.
- Donald Faison as Dante Robinson, a short, food-loving African American boy with a large afro who is with Jocinda at the court.
- Lindsay Barnett as:
  - Vinnie the Gooch, a snarky Caucasian boy who serves as color commentator of the Backyard Baseball League.
  - Ashley Webber and Sidney Webber, Caucasian identical twin sisters who play tennis. Their personalities in the special are based on their meaner personalities in the post-Humongous-developed games.
- Deborah Baker Jr. as Kimmy Eckman, a candy-obsessed Caucasian girl who is said to have poor stats. Her backyard, Eckman Acres, is mentioned in the special.
- Michael Vlamis as Tony Delvecchio, a greaser-like Caucasian boy who works at Nick's Pizza and Games.
- Arturo Castro as Pablo Sanchez (nicknamed "the Secret Weapon"), a short, athletically talented, and helpful Hispanic boy who normally speaks Spanish. Chris Waters compared Pablo to other inexplicably talented characters from throughout pop culture, including Snoopy from Peanuts, Pikachu from Pokémon, and Fonzie from Happy Days.

Uncredited actors also voice various balls that Stephanie imagines to be mocking her and an off-screen man at Nick's Pizza who yells at Tony for not greeting her with enthusiasm. Additionally, some of the other "Backyard Kids" including Angela Delvecchio (Tony's sister), Ernie Steele, Lisa Crocket, Marky Dubois, Mikey Thomas, and Vicki Kawaguchi make brief unvoiced cameo appearances at Steele Stadium (Ernie's backyard where the opening day game is held).

== Production and marketing ==
Development on the special began in April 2024. When Backyard Sports' relaunch was formally revealed in August that same year, it was stated that plans were made to expand the franchise into film and television. In November 2024, production on the special was announced. The special was produced by Lighthouse Studios, with production finishing by October 2025.

On October 28, 2025, it was announced that Tiffany Haddish, Arturo Castro, Ego Nwodim, Christopher Mintz-Plasse, Donald Faison, Ashleigh Crystal Hairston, Adam Pally, and Utkarsh Ambudkar had joined the cast for the special and that it would premiere at Dave & Buster's locations in 2026 before moving to YouTube at a later date. It was announced that the special would be formally titled as Sticky Situation, although this title ultimately went unused in the special proper upon release.

A teaser trailer was released on January 5, 2026, showing a shot of the Backyard Sports League clubhouse/tree house. It was followed by the official trailer on January 22.

A teaser for a new Backyard Baseball game was included in the special, between the last scene and the credits.

On February 7, 2026, Playground Productions released a breakdown video on the Backyard Sports YouTube channel featuring executive producer Chris Waters explaining the behind-the-scenes decisions for the special and its production.

== Reception ==
The special received positive reviews from critics. Screen Rant praised the special's message, humor, and interpretation of the franchise's characters, saying that it provided "a modern answer to Peanuts". Sports Gamers Online commented positively on the animation and Pablo Sanchez's role in the special but found Adam Pally's performance as Pete Wheeler lacking in the charm of the character's original portrayal.

By February 22, 2026, the special received over one million views on YouTube.

== Future ==
Playground Productions executives Lindsay Barnett and Chris Waters have stated an interest in producing more Backyard Sports animated projects, including a potential scripted series, if the special is successful.

It was later announced at San Diego Comic-Con on July 24, 2026, that the special would be expanded into a full animated series titled Backyard Sports: The Animated Series. It will consist of 20 episodes running for 11 minutes each, with much of the voice cast of The Animated Special reprising their roles. A teaser trailer consisting of a mixture of new footage and footage from The Animated Special was released the same day.
