= Hooking Up (film) =

- Promotional release poster
- Directed by: Nico Raineau
- Written by: Nico Raineau; Lauren Schacher
- Produced by: Jordan Yale Levine; Jordan Beckerman; Brittany Snow; Jon Keeyes
- Starring: Brittany Snow; Sam Richardson; Vivica A. Fox
- Cinematography: Jeff Bierman
- Edited by: Waldemar Centeno
- Music by: Gregory Townley
- Distributed by: Saban Films
- Release date: March 20, 2020
- Running time: 104 minutes
- Country: United States
- Language: English

Hooking Up is a 2020 American comedy-drama film directed by Nico Raineau and starring Brittany Snow and Sam Richardson.

== Plot ==
In Atlanta, strangers Darla and Bailey cross paths when her court-ordered sexual addiction recovery meeting is held next door to his cancer support group. Bailey, a testicular cancer survivor, works at a gym and is struggling to get over his ex-fiancée, Elizabeth. Darla, a sex columnist, is fired for her increasingly debauched writing and exploits at the office.

After learning that his remaining testicle must be removed, a drunken Bailey stumbles into Darla's meeting by mistake and announces his diagnosis. Desperate to save her career, she invites him on a cross-country road trip: they will revisit the scenes of her past sexual encounters, and recreate them together before his surgery. Bailey agrees, on the condition they visit Dallas, where he hopes to reconnect with Elizabeth. Unbeknownst to Bailey, Darla persuades her former editor, Tanya, to let her publish a daily blog about the trip.

Following a map of her sexual past, Darla and Bailey bond as they have trysts across the country; she writes a blog entry about each encounter, and he secretly Instagrams their trip. Darla discovers Bailey's passion for drawing, and he considers not going through with the surgery. They sneak into a house Darla is reluctant to revisit, where she reveals she had sex with a man she knew was married; his wife walked in on them, drove off, and was paralyzed in a car accident. Stricken with guilt, Darla is comforted by a sympathetic Bailey.

In Dallas, Darla is forced to pose as Bailey's girlfriend and meet his parents, who are dismissive of his art; his mother, Cindy, hopes to reunite him with Elizabeth. Sneaking into Elizabeth's childhood bedroom to recreate losing his virginity, Bailey and Darla spend a romantic night together, kissing for the first time. He discovers her blog before they attend a party at Elizabeth's parents' house, where Elizabeth inadvertently reveals Bailey's posts portraying Darla as his girlfriend. Darla confronts him for using her to make Elizabeth jealous, and he accuses her of using him for her blog, disparaging her writing and sexual past. She humiliates him with the truth in front of Elizabeth and his family, and storms out.

Elizabeth reconnects with Bailey, and he tells her of his new diagnosis. They prepare to return to Atlanta together, but she upsets him by revealing his diagnosis to their parents. Darla has sex with a man she meets at a bar, before angrily sending him away. Visiting her mother, Betty, who shares her destructive behavior, Darla struggles with her final blog post. She is touched to discover Bailey's drawings on their map, and her mother rejects her attempt to discuss addiction.

Arriving in Atlanta, Bailey realizes that he and Elizabeth have outgrown their relationship, and they amicably part ways. Darla makes peace with her mother, who fixes her car, and she arrives at Bailey's support group just as he is describing his appreciation for her. They reconcile, and he undergoes his second orchiectomy, while she commits to treating her sex addiction.

Agreeing to remain platonic friends while they help each other through their recovery, Bailey finds a job as an illustrator, and Darla is offered her job back due to the popularity of her blog, but declines and receives an advance to write her own book. One year later, Bailey's cancer is in remission and Darla has spent a successful year in recovery, and they agree to go on a date.

== Cast ==
- Brittany Snow as Darla Beane
- Sam Richardson as Bailey Brighton
- Anna Akana as Elizabeth Carthright
- Jordana Brewster as Tanya
- Vivica A. Fox as Cindy Brighton
- Amy Pietz as Betty Beane
- Shaun J. Brown as Franklin
- Alexis G. Zall as Molly

== Reception ==
The film has a 26% rating on Rotten Tomatoes. The site's critical consensus reads, "Hooking Up highlights Sam Richardson and Brittany Snow's strengths as leads -- and their limitations when saddled with a deeply subpar script." Tara McNamara of Common Sense Media awarded the film two stars out of five. Alan Ng of Film Threat gave the film a 7 out of 10.

Lisa Kennedy of Variety gave the film a positive review and wrote, "Director Nico Raineau and co-writer Lauren Schacher hug the familiar beats of the form while rubbing up against its conventions with some naughty, sometimes endearing tweaks."

Frank Scheck of The Hollywood Reporter gave the film a negative review and wrote, "You wouldn't think that sex addiction and testicular cancer are topics that could be mined for any but the cheapest of laughs. And Hooking Up would prove you right."
