= Nate Mooney =

American actor (born 1972)

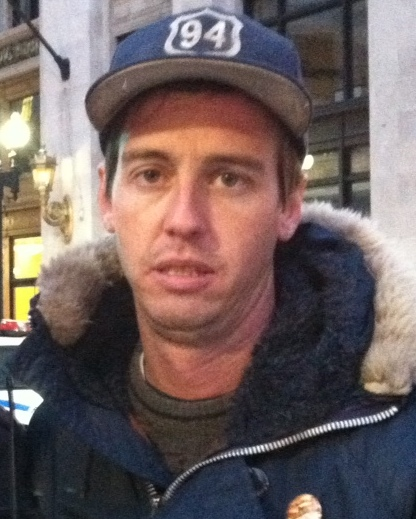
- Nate Mooney, 2014
- Born: January 26, 1972 (age 54); Franklin, Milwaukee County, Wisconsin
- Occupation: Actor
- Years active: 2000–present
- Known for: It's Always Sunny in Philadelphia

Nate Mooney (born January 26, 1972) is an American actor best known for his recurring role as Ryan McPoyle on the FX comedy series It's Always Sunny in Philadelphia.

== Early life ==
Mooney was born and raised in Franklin, Milwaukee County, Wisconsin. He graduated from Franklin High School in 1990. He graduated from Iowa State University with a degree in aerospace engineering before entering acting.

== Career ==
He appeared on various television series, including Breakout Kings, Grey's Anatomy and Nip/Tuck. He played the role of Lurvy in the film Charlotte's Web.

Mooney gained his popularity by playing the role of Ryan McPoyle, the brother of Liam McPoyle and Margaret McPoyle, on the FXX show It's Always Sunny in Philadelphia. Ryan is a comedic dimwit and is often rebuked for making dumb comments to his brother, such as offering to split a large sum of money (or clams) fifty-fifty-fifty to accommodate three people.

He also had a small part as an arms dealer in one episode of Breaking Bad's third season.

From 2014 to 2018, Mooney played a lead role as Deputy Leon Drinkwater on IFC's Stan Against Evil.

== Filmography ==
=== Film ===
Year	Title	Role	Notes
2000	Vampire Vermont	Dave	Video
2003	Just Another Story	Chester	
2004	Shards	Cole	Short film
2005	Elizabethtown	Trent	
2005	Mozart and the Whale	Roger	
2006	Seraphim Falls	Cousin Bill	
2006	Charlotte's Web	Lurvy	
2008	Pretty Bird	Randy Pendler	
2008	Just Add Water	Stan	
2008	Black Crescent Moon	Bucky Adelson	
2008	Night Life		TV movie
2009	Push	Pinky Stein	
2010	Black Hole	Doug	Short film
2010	Dead Cat		Short film
2012	One for the Money	Eddie Gazarra	
2012	Thank You Note from a Dead Man	Drew	Short film
2013	Deep Dark Canyon	Ronnie Cavanaugh	
2013	Night Moves	Driver with Flat Tire	
2016	Rules Don't Apply	Orderly	
2017	Wilson	Allan Coffey	
2017	Girlfriend's Day	Warez	
2018	Doulo	Nate	Short film
2019	Adopt a Highway	Homeless Man	

=== Television ===
Year	Title	Role	Notes
2001–2002	Ed	Russell	3 episodes
2002	Law & Order: Special Victims Unit	Terry Williard	1 episode
2003	Becker	Paranoid Guy	1 episode
2004	Monk	Scat	1 episode
2005–present	It's Always Sunny in Philadelphia	Ryan McPoyle	8 episodes
2006	CSI: Crime Scene Investigation	Larry Smite	1 episode
2006	Nip/Tuck	Alex Coffee	1 episode
2007	The Riches	Ken Dannegam	4 episodes
2010	Criminal Minds	Connor O'Brien	1 episode
2010	Breaking Bad	Arms Dealer	1 episode
2010	Terriers	Bradley	1 episode
2011	House	Rollo	1 episode
2011	Psych	Wendell	1 episode
2012	Grey's Anatomy	Randy	1 episode
2012	Mike & Molly	Oswald	1 episode
2012	Breakout Kings	Brent Howson	1 episode
2012	Weeds	Detective Zapf	1 episode
2015	Big Time in Hollywood, FL	Cory	1 episode
2015	American Odyssey	Bob Offer	13 episodes
2016	Stan Against Evil	Deputy Leon Drinkwater	7 episodes
2020	Everything's Gonna Be Okay	Bryan	1 episode
2023	Perry Mason	Mr. Kellard	1 episode
