= Pools (film) =

2025 coming-of-age film by Sam Hayes

- Directed by: Sam Hayes
- Written by: Sam Hayes
- Produced by: Sam Hayes; Jack Heston; Seth Savoy; Adonis Tountas; Mike D. Ware
- Starring: Odessa A'zion; Ariel Winter; Tyler Alvarez; Mason Gooding; Michael Vlamis; Francesca Noel; Suzanne Cryer
- Cinematography: Ben Hardwicke
- Edited by: Tucker Marolf
- Music by: Cody Fry
- Production company: Paesanos Pictures
- Distributed by: Circle Collectives
- Release dates: April 12, 2025 (TIFF); September 5, 2025 (United States)
- Running time: 99 minutes
- Country: United States
- Language: English
- Box office: $53,478

Pools is a 2025 American coming of age film directed by Sam Hayes in his debut feature film. The film stars Odessa A'zion, Ariel Winter, Tyler Alvarez, Michael Vlamis, Francesca Noel and Suzanne Cryer. The film has received mixed reviews.

== Cast ==
- Odessa A'zion as Kennedy Warren
- Ariel Winter as Delaney
- Tyler Alvarez as Blake
- Mason Gooding as Reed
- Michael Vlamis as Michael
- Francesca Noel as Shane
- Suzanne Cryer as Diana Lewis, Dean of Students
- Raymond Fox as Dale
- Lucinda Johnston as Suzy

== Production ==
First titled Pools at Night, it was set in and filmed in the Green Bay Road Historic District, Lake Forest, Illinois.

The narrator role and cardboard cutout began as Mike Ditka, later changed.

The movies that most inspired this one are The Graduate, Ferris Bueller's Day Off, and The Breakfast Club. Ladybird too. - Sam Hayes

== See also ==
- The Swimmer (1968 film)
