= Ego Nwodim =

American comedian and actress (born 1988)

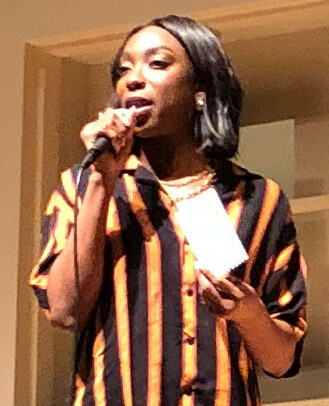
- Nwodim in 2023
- Born: Egobunma Kelechi Nwodim; March 10, 1988 (age 38); Baltimore, Maryland, U.S.
- Education: University of Southern California (BS)
- Occupations: Actress; comedian
- Years active: 2012–present
- Relatives: Eberechi Eze (cousin)

Egobunma Kelechi Nwodim (/ˈɛɡoʊ ˈwoʊdɪm/; born March 10, 1988) is an American actress and comedian. She was a cast member on the NBC sketch comedy series Saturday Night Live from 2018, beginning with the show's 44th season, to 2025, ending with the show's 50th season.

== Early life ==
Ego Nwodim was born on March 10, 1988. She is of Nigerian Igbo heritage. Her cousin, English footballer Eberechi Eze, plays for Premier League club Arsenal and the England national football team.

In 2006, she graduated from Eastern Technical High School in Essex, Baltimore County, Maryland. She received a biology degree from University of Southern California. When she decided to pursue a career in comedy, she began taking classes at the Upright Citizens Brigade Theatre (UCB) in Los Angeles.

== Career ==
Nwodim was a regular cast member at UCB, where she also performed her one-woman show Great Black Women... and Then There's Me. She was named one of the New Faces at the 2016 Just for Laughs festival. Also that year, she performed at the CBS Diversity Showcase.

Early supporting roles on television for Nwodim included Law & Order True Crime: The Menendez Murders (a three-episode arc in 2017), 2 Broke Girls, and Living Biblically. Impersonating Maya Angelou, Nwodim roasted various celebrities and companies in a 2017 Funny or Die sketch.

Nwodim's addition to the cast of Saturday Night Live, a long-running NBC sketch-comedy show, as a featured player was announced on September 21, 2018. On September 8, 2020, Nwodim was promoted to a repertory player ahead of the forty-sixth season of Saturday Night Live.

In 2024, Nwodim launched the podcast Thanks Dad with Ego Nwodim, in which she interviews guests as her "Dad for the Day"; the show won the 2025 Ambie Award for Best Interview Podcast. Nwodim has made several guest appearances on other podcasts such as Comedy Bang! Bang! and Spontaneanation.

On April 5, 2025, Nwodim unintentionally put NBC at risk of being fined by the FCC following a Weekend Update segment in which her character, "Ms. Eggy," engaged in a call-and-response routine that prompted audience members to shout the word "shit". On May 17, Weekend Update anchor Colin Jost jokingly introduced Nwodim by saying "You know her, you love her [and] you got her fined by the FCC". Ultimately, NBC was likely not fined because of this incident.

On September 12, 2025, Nwodim announced in an Instagram post that she had decided to leave Saturday Night Live ahead of its fifty-first season.

== Personal life ==
In support of her cousin Eberechi Eze, who plays for Arsenal and the England national football team, Nwodim wore a Crystal Palace (Eze's club at the time) shirt with his name on it during an episode of Saturday Night Live in 2023. She wore it again on May 17, 2025, after Crystal Palace's victory in the 2025 FA Cup final.

== Filmography ==
=== Film ===
Film work by Ego Nwodim
Year	Title	Role	Notes
2012	Getting Help	Yvonne	Short film
2014	You're Kind of Weird But I Like It	The Waitress	Short film
2015	Zola	Zola	Short film
2017	Feminist Campfire Stories	Boy 2	Short film
2017	They Finally Made a Handmaid's Tale for Men		Short film
2017	Women Who Didn't Love Wonder Woman Support Group	Becca	Short film
2017	Singularity	Assistant	
2018	I Will Find You	Number 29	Short film
2018	5th Passenger	Dr. Stephan	
2018	It's a Party	April London	
2020	Magic Camp	Volunteer	
2020	The Broken Hearts Gallery	Harvard	
2022	Spin Me Round	Emily	
2022	Lyle, Lyle, Crocodile	Carol	
2023	Scrambled	Sheila	
2023	Good Burger 2	Edie	
2023	Baby Shark's Big Movie!	Leah (voice)	
2023	Genie	Diana	
2023	Diary of a Wimpy Kid Christmas: Cabin Fever	Officer Leonard (voice)	
2024	Players	Claire	
2025	Gabby's Dollhouse: The Movie	Twiggy (voice)	
2026	Hoppers	Fish Queen (voice)	
2026	Little Brother	Lenore	
2027	CoComelon: The Movie	(voice)	
2027	Return to You	Nancy	

=== Television ===
Television work by Ego Nwodim
Year	Title	Role	Notes
2012	The Unwritten Rules	Nicole	Episode: "Just a Group of Us"
2014	Women to Men: Please Catcall Us	PSA Woman	Television film
2015	Hellevator	Contestant	Episode: "Pilot"
2015–2016	CollegeHumor Originals	Various	2 episodes
2015–2016	Adam Ruins Everything	Various	2 episodes
2016	Almost Asian	Britney	Episode: "Twins"
2016	Broken	Carmen	Episode: "The Ghost of Mike"
2016	UCB Comedy Originals	Dr. Rubin	Episode: "Dog Virus"
2016	Galactic War Room	Ayla	6 episodes
2016–2017	K.C. Undercover	Agent McKenzie	2 episodes
2016–2017	The Elite Daily Show	Various	4 episodes
2017	Drive Share	New Mother	Episode: "New Parents"
2017	Liv and Maddie	Mrs. Karsch	2 episodes
2017	2 Broke Girls	Jillian	Episode: "And 2 Broke Girls: The Movie"
2017	Real Rob	Billy Alderman	Episode: "Best Play Date Ever"
2017	Law & Order True Crime	Lynn	3 episodes
2017	Do You Want to See a Dead Body?	Danny Teen Fan	Episode: "A Body and an Ex-Con"
2017	Dirtbags	Single Woman	Episode: "Husband"
2018	Dell: Tales of Transformation		Episode: "KK Conquers Everest"
2018	Living Biblically	Tracy	Episode: "Never Let Loyalty Leave You"
2018–2025	Saturday Night Live	Various characters	Main cast
2019	The Real Bros of Simi Valley	Brenda	3 episodes
2020	Shrill	Abby	Episode: "Wedding"
2020	Brockmire	Liz	4 episodes
2020	The Shivering Truth	Rosa (voice)	Episode: "Nesslessness"
2021	Love Life	Ola Adebayo	2 episodes
2022	Roar	Carole Andrews	Episode: "The Woman Who Solved Her Own Murder"
2022	Celebrity Jeopardy!	Herself (contestant)	Episode: "Simu Liu, Ego Nwodim and Andy Richter"
2023	RuPaul's Drag Race All Stars	Herself	Guest judge (season 8); Episode: "The Fame Games Variety Extravaganza"
2023	RuPaul's Drag Race All Stars: Untucked	Herself	Episode: "All Stars Untucked: The Fame Games Variety Extravaganza"
2023	Agent Elvis	Zara (voice)	Episode: "Maghrebi Mint"
2023	Miracle Workers	Belinda	Episode: "Ronald Proudheart"
2023	Futurama	Dung Beetle Shaman (voice)	Episode: "Parasites Regained"
2023	The Great American Baking Show	Herself (contestant)	Episode: "Celebrity Holiday"
2023	Celebrity Wheel of Fortune	Herself (contestant)	Episode: "Lauren Lapkus, Ego Nwodim and Jeff Ross"
2024	Good Times: Black Again	Various voices	5 episodes
2024	Mr. Throwback	Kimberly	Main cast
2024	It's Florida, Man	Carolyn	Episode: "Toes"
2025	Today with Jenna & Friends	Herself (guest co-host)	Week of February 3–7, five programs
2025	Bearbrick	Charlene (voice)	Recurring role
2025	Poker Face	Gilda Deacon	Episode: "Hometown Hero"
2026	41st Independent Spirit Awards	Herself (host)	Television special
2026	Not Suitable for Work	Kate Woodson	Recurring role; 6 episodes

=== Web ===
Year	Title	Role	Notes
2026	Backyard Sports: The Animated Special	Stephanie Morgan (voice)	Animated special
