= Michael Vlamis =

American actor and screenwriter (born 1990)

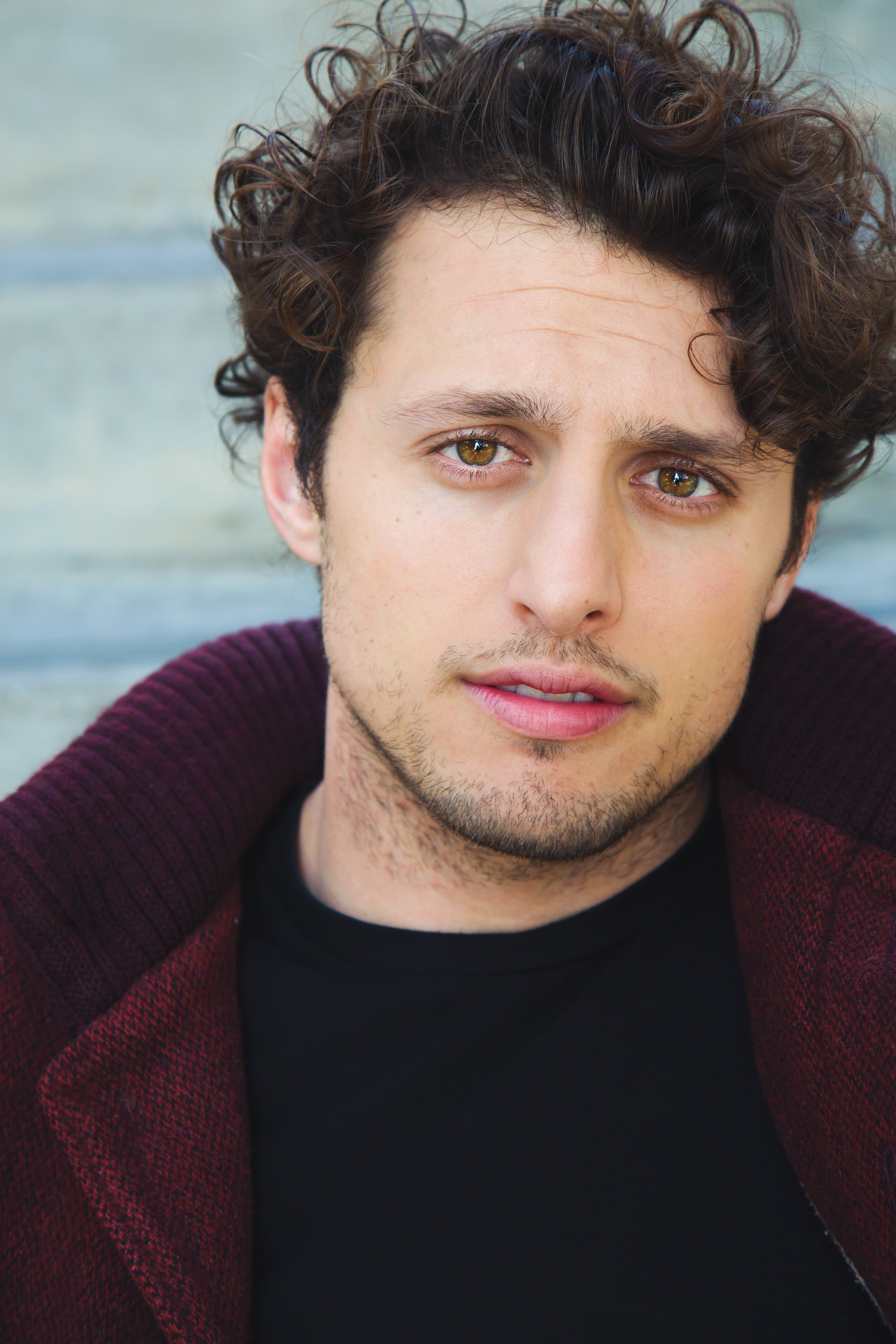
- Vlamis in 2017
- Born: March 27, 1990 (age 36); Chicago, Illinois, U.S.
- Education: Chapman University (BS)
- Occupations: Actor, screenwriter
- Years active: 2009–present

Michael Vlamis (born March 27, 1990) is an American actor, screenwriter, director, and producer known for his role as Michael Guerin in Roswell, New Mexico. Vlamis made his feature directorial debut with his psychological thriller, Crossword.

== Early life and education ==
Vlamis was born on March 27, 1990, in Chicago, Illinois. He is of Greek, Serbian and Lebanese ancestry. Vlamis moved to California to attend Chapman University, where he was a third baseman on the school's varsity baseball team. Vlamis earned a Bachelor of Science degree in entrepreneurship.

== Career ==
Vlamis began his career in marketing for Modify Watches. He made his television debut in an episode of New Girl and began acting in short films. He appeared in MemE! True Hollywood Story, a short film he wrote that won the 2017 Snapchat Shorts contest, a competition for short films under 120 seconds in length.

After leaving his marketing job in 2017, Vlamis began writing and drove for Uber to support himself. Vlamis later booked the lead role of Michael Guerin in the CW's Roswell, New Mexico. In 2019, Vlamis co-wrote a biopic about the life of late rapper Mac Miller, titled Blue Side Park. The screenplay was later added to the 2019 Black List, a survey of "most-liked" unproduced film scripts. Vlamis appeared alongside Chloe Bennet in the 2020 film, 5 Years Apart, which was his first produced feature film. In 2022, he made his feature directorial debut with Crossword, a psychological thriller he also wrote, produced, and acted in. Kenan Thompson's company, Artists For Artists, acquired the film to handle sales.

== Personal life ==
Vlamis resides in West Hollywood, California.

== Filmography ==
=== Film ===
Year	Title	Role	Notes
2018	Spiral	Ryan	
2020	5 Years Apart	Sammy	Also producer
2021	The Resort	Sam	
2024	Crossword	James	Also writer, director, and producer
2025	Pools	Michael	Also executive producer
2026	Grizzly Night	Leonard Landa	
2026	The Odyssey	Bandit / Priest in Pylos	
2026	Corpus	Ross	

=== Television ===
Year	Title	Role	Notes
2012	Two Close	Trevor Matthews	Television film
2013	New Girl	Hipster Jerkwad	Episode: "Tinfinity"
2013	Heartbreak High, USA	Student/Cool Guy	Miniseries; 1 episode
2015	Narratives	Anthony	1 episode
2016	Us Too	Rex	1 episode
2017	VlamCarter	Michael / Tommy Salami / Mike	Miniseries; also writer, director, and producer
2018	Every Other Weekend	Jeese	1 episode
2019–2022	Roswell, New Mexico	Michael Guerin	Main role; 52 episodes
2026	Backyard Sports: The Animated Special	Tony Delvecchio	Television special
