= Christopher Clements =

English cricketer

Personal information
- Full name: Christopher Jonathan Clements
- Born: 25 October 1954 (age 72); Wheatley, Oxfordshire, England
- Batting: Right-handed

Domestic team information
- Years: Team
- 1975–1989: Oxfordshire

Career statistics
| Competition | List A |
|---|---|
| Matches | 3 |
| Runs scored | 9 |
| Batting average | 3.00 |
| 100s/50s | –/– |
| Top score | 5 |
| Balls bowled | – |
| Wickets | – |
| Bowling average | – |
| 5 wickets in innings | – |
| 10 wickets in match | – |
| Best bowling | – |
| Catches/stumpings | –/– |
- Source: Cricinfo, 24 May 2011

Christopher Jonathan Clements (born 25 October 1954) is a former English cricketer. Clements was a right-handed batsman. He was born in Wheatley, Oxfordshire.

Clements made his debut for Oxfordshire in the 1975 Minor Counties Championship against Devon. Clements played Minor counties cricket for Oxfordshire from 1975 to 1989, which included 60 Minor Counties Championship matches and a single MCCA Knockout Trophy match. He made his List A debut against Warwickshire in the 1980 Gillette Cup. He played 2 further List A matches, against Essex in 1985 and Leicestershire in 1987. In his 3 List A matches, he scored 9 runs at a batting average of 3.00, with a high score of 5.
