= Fish counter =

Device for counting fish populations

Automatic fish counters are automatic devices for measuring the number of fish passing along a particular river in a particular period of time. Usually one particular species is of interest.

One important species studied by fish counters are Atlantic salmon. This species is of interest owing to its ecologically vulnerable status and anadromous lifestyles.

== Methods of operation ==
Fish counters can be divided into three principal types: resistive counters, optical counters, and hydroacoustic counters.

=== Resistive counters ===
A resistive counter is associated with an in-river structure, an example constituting a Crump weir. The resistivity of a fish is lower than that of water. So, as fish cross this barrier, they pass embedded electrodes, and the difference in resistivity disturbs the field established in the vicinity of the electrodes, altering inter-electrode resistance. With three electrodes these disturbances can then be measured by a Wheatstone bridge, or other means, to detect the size and direction of travel of the fish.

Fish counters of this type are used widely in Scotland to census populations of Atlantic salmon, where comparison with closed-circuit television shows around a 97% detection rate.

=== Optical counters ===
An optical counter is also associated with an in-river structure. However, rather than pass electrodes, in an optical counter the fish interrupt some of a number of vertically arranged beams of light. The pattern of beam-breaks can be used to determine the size, profile, and direction of motion of the fish.

Infrared light is used for minimizing the disturbance of the fish as they will not see the light when passing through the counter. When a fish swims through the net of light beams, the resulting silhouette image is used for counting as well as estimating the size of each fish. Each individual image is memorized in the control unit so that the counting can be verified afterwards.

Some systems such as the Riverwatcher use the infrared scanner to trigger a digital camera to capture between 1 and 5 photos or a short video clip of each fish. The computer then automatically links the images to other information contained in the database for that individual fish such as size, passing hour, speed, silhouette image, temperature etc.

The camera is installed in a special tunnel that contains both the camera and lights providing constant light, and same distance from the camera for the fish. That way, it is possible to get good images of the fish regardless of time of day.

The performance of optical counters has been determined by studies, under various conditions, to be greater than 90%. Optical counters can also distinguish the size of fish more accurately than other counter types and so are particularly useful where a mixture of species inhabit a river (for example rivers where salmon mix with sea trout).

The key disadvantage of optical counters is the small penetration of the beams through the water, restricting their use to narrow river features or in-river structures, an example being fish ladders.

=== Hydroacoustic counters ===
Hydroacoustic counters operate using the principles of sonar. A fish is insonified by a sound source and reflections from the fish are detected by an underwater microphone. The reflection occurs because of the sudden change in impedance to sound waves within the fish, particularly at the swimbladder (90% of the reflection).

Hydroacoustic counters do not require in-river structures, but require skilled installation and operators. Without skilled installation at ideal sites hydroacoustic counters can be inaccurate. Studies typically indicate detection rates of 50% to 80%, though one study found detection rates as low as 3%. Careful planning and pre-siting study must be used to determine effectiveness.

The lack of a requirement for any in-river structure makes the counters an attractive proposition. Generally used for short-term or seasonal studies, some situations require a long-term count which is accurate in absolute terms, not only in relative change (for example, no hydroacoustic sensors are routinely used in the detection of Scottish Atlantic salmon). In these instances resistivity or optical sensors tend to be preferred. Such methods usually require significant habitat modification, such as construction of a weir to funnel the fish through the counter.

Recent advances in automated hydroacoustic monitoring systems has allowed continuous monitoring for periods exceeding 18 months. These systems include intelligent monitoring and real-time data processing, ensuring proper operation and publication of status and results (e.g. fish counts) on a routine basis.

== Siting counters ==
=== In river structures ===
Resistivity and (particularly) optical fish counters require in-river structures to direct the fish through the detection aperture of the counter. Fish ladders and Borland fish passes are effective structures for this purpose and occasionally a natural restriction within the river may be used for a similar purpose. However, for most counters a custom in-river structure will be required. One of the most effective such structures is the Crump weir, a triangular profile weir designed to ensure rapid planar flow over the detector.

=== Siting within the river system ===
A species of anadromous fish, such as the Atlantic salmon, may return to a particular breeding ground throughout its life. This means that within the larger rivers a number of quite distinct populations may cross a counter together, in aggregate. A population which uses a particular tributary may collapse whilst the overall numbers are not clearly affected. Issues with the management of that particular tributary and population therefore go unnoticed. Counters should be placed to count individual populations, rather than the species in aggregate, in order that population collapses and recoveries can be detected.

== Alternative methods ==
The results of automatic fish counters can be supplemented, confirmed, or replaced by a number of alternative techniques, varying in accuracy, cost, complexity, and skew effects.

- Electrofishing
- Traps
- Net and rod counts
- Redd counts (disturbances in gravel caused by mating activities of some fish)
