= Ashleigh Crystal Hairston =

American voice actress

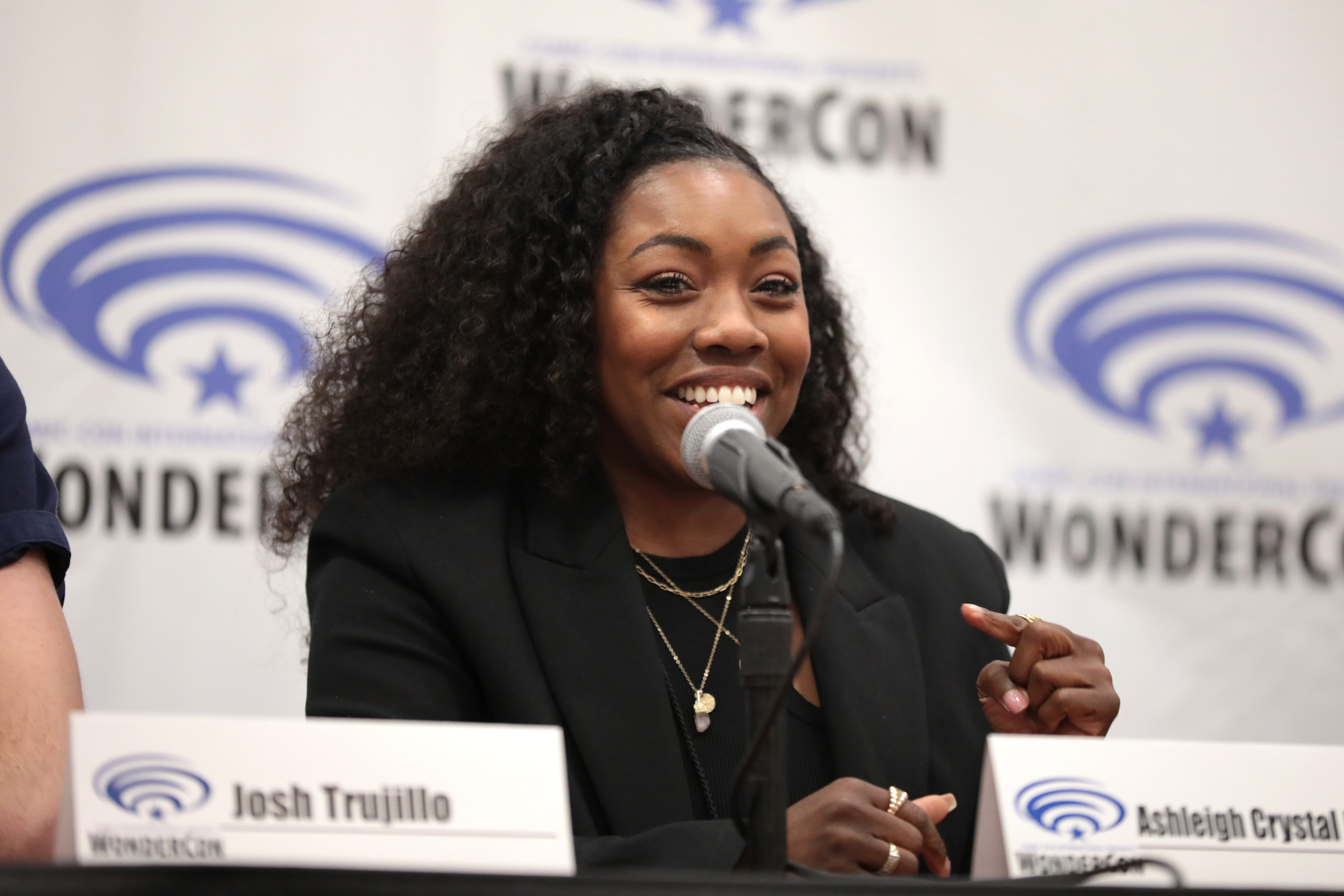
- Hairston at 2023 WonderCon
- Born: Seattle, Washington, U.S.
- Occupations: Voice actress; screenwriter
- Years active: 2012–present

Ashleigh Crystal Hairston is an American voice actress and writer. She has provided voice acting for Avengers Assemble, Craig of the Creek, and Tiny Toons Looniversity, and was a writer for Jessica's Big Little World. Hairston is the co-developer and main voice role in The Fairly OddParents: A New Wish. For her writing, she has received nominations for two Children's & Family Emmy Awards and one Annie Award.

== Life and career ==
Hairston was born in Seattle, Washington, and raised in nearby Bellevue, Washington. She is the youngest of five children. Her father was the minister of a predominantly Black church in Seattle and as such she was active in the church.

She attended Howard University and majored in Theatre Arts. After graduation she moved to Los Angeles in 2012 and took improv and sketch writing classes at iO West. She also performed improv at Second City Hollywood and on a sketch team for Maude Night at UCB. Hairston also trained in voice acting.

Hairston booked her first voice acting role in 2019 for Avengers Assemble. While voicing a recurring character on Craig of the Creek, she later joined the writing staff in her first writing job. She incorporated her childhood experiences playing double dutch in one of the episodes she wrote. Hairston was the head writer for the Craig of the Creek spin-off Jessica's Big Little World. She has also written for Wolfboy and the Everything Factory on Apple TV+.

She is the co-developer, co-executive producer, showrunner, and the lead voice role for the Netflix revival series The Fairly OddParents: A New Wish. The series follows a young Black girl, Hazel Wells, as the new god-kid of fairy godparents Cosmo and Wanda.

Hairston is the voice of Babs Bunny in the HBO Max revival Tiny Toons Looniversity. In Backyard Sports: The Animated Special, based on the Backyard Sports video game series, she voiced Sunny Day and Jocinda Smith.

== Accolades ==
- 2023 – Nominee, Children's & Family Emmy Award for Outstanding Writing for an Animated Children's or Young Teen Program (for Craig of the Creek)
- 2024 – Rising Star In Animation, Animation Magazine
- 2025 – Nominee, Annie Award for Outstanding Achievement for Writing in an Animated Television/Media Production (for Jessica's Big Little World)
- 2025 – Nominee, Children's & Family Emmy Award for Outstanding Writing for a Preschool or Children's Series (for Jessica's Big Little World)
