= Deborah Baker Jr. =

American actress

- Occupation: Actress
- Years active: 2003–present

Deborah Baker Jr. is an American actress. She is known for her role as Esther on the CBS TV series The Great Indoors and for her role as Denise Miller on IFC's Stan Against Evil. She is a performer at Upright Citizens Brigade.

== Career ==
In 2019, Baker appeared in a series of RumChata liqueur commercials playing "The RumChata Fairy".

As of 2025, Baker currently provides the voice of Sara in the Disney Channel animated series StuGo.

== Awards ==
Baker was nominated for Best Supporting Actress at the Hoboken International Film Fest in 2013.

== Filmography ==
=== Television ===
- The Great Indoors as Esther (2016–17)
- Stan Against Evil as Denise Miller (2016–18)
- The Neighborhood as Brittany (2020–21)
- StuGo as Sara and Sarah (2025)

=== Web ===
- Backyard Sports: The Animated Special as Kimmy Eckman (2026)
