= Modify Watches =

American retailer of customizable modular watches

Modify Watches is an American retailer of customizable modular watches. Founded in 2010, Modify Watches sells its own designs in addition to sport licensed watches including MLB, NBA, MLS and NHL. Modify Watches also produced fully customized designs for companies like Google, Facebook, LinkedIn, Wired, Nike, Pinarello, SRAM, Cartoon Network, SEGA, Bethesda Softworks and Adult Swim.

Modify Watches is based in San Francisco, California, United States.

== History ==
Modify Watches was founded in 2010 in California by two UC Berkeley-Haas MBA alums under the name "The Swap Watch". After selling a small amount of test products to gauge demand, The Swap Watch was re-branded and launched a new line of watches under the "Modify Watches" name. The two entrepreneurs were able to attract a small following of fans through its customer-centric business model, handwriting thank-you notes to every customer that ordered watches. The company continued to use customer feedback as a resource to reiterate its product and re-adjust its business model.

In February 2014, Modify Watches successfully launched a Kickstarter campaign to enable consumers to create and purchase watches. The company turned its office into a manufacturing facility, hand-assembling every watch in-house. The company has been applauded for creating local jobs and hiring retired veterans.

By 2015, Modify Watches had grown into a successful e-commerce company, receiving praise for excellence in customer service. The company received further media attention when it was featured on Good Morning America and The Ellen DeGeneres Show. The company went on to acquire major sport licensing deals with MLB, NBA, MLS and NHL.

Modify Watches is led by co-founder and CEO Aaron Schwartz, whose work has been featured in Forbes and The New York Times, Time (magazine) and TechCrunch

== Awards ==
- On November 17, 2011, Modify Watches was named to the Empact100 list, which “recognizes the top 100 companies run by young entrepreneurs age 30 or younger who impact our economy and inspire others to join the movement to revitalize our economy by starting a business of their own.”
