= Primetime Emmy Award for Outstanding Picture Editing for a Single-Camera Comedy Series =

Television award category

Primetime Emmy Award for Picture Editing for a Single-Camera Comedy Series
- Awarded for: Outstanding Picture Editing for a Single-Camera Comedy Series
- Country: United States
- Presented by: Academy of Television Arts & Sciences
- Currently held by: Hacks (2026)
- Website: emmys.com

The Primetime Emmy Award for Outstanding Picture Editing for a Single-Camera Comedy Series is an award given at the Primetime Creative Arts Emmy Awards. This award and Outstanding Single-Camera Picture Editing for a Drama Series replaced Outstanding Single-Camera Picture Editing for a Series in 2003.

In the following list, the first titles listed in gold and bold are the winners; those not in gold are nominees, which are listed in alphabetical order. The years given are those in which the ceremonies took place:

== Winners and nominations ==
=== 1970s ===
Outstanding Film Editing for a Series

Year	Program	Episode	Nominee(s)	Network
1970 (22nd)
1970 (22nd)	Bracken's World	"Sweet Smell of Failure"	Bill Mosher	NBC
1970 (22nd)	The Ghost & Mrs. Muir	"The Great Power Failure"	Axel R. Hubert	ABC
1970 (22nd)	Mission: Impossible		Arthur David Hilton	CBS
1971 (23rd)
1971 (23rd)	The Bold Ones: The Senator	"A Continual Roar of Musketry"	Michael Economou	NBC
1971 (23rd)	The Bold Ones: The Senator	"To Taste of Death But Once"	Douglas Stewart	NBC
1971 (23rd)	Hawaii Five-O		Arthur David Hilton	CBS
1972 (24th)
1972 (24th)	Columbo	"Death Lends a Hand"	Edward M. Abroms	NBC
1972 (24th)	The Bold Ones: The Lawyers		Richard Bracken, Gloryette Clark and J. Terry Williams	NBC
1972 (24th)	Longstreet		Joseph Dervin	ABC
1973 (25th)
1973 (25th)	The Waltons		Gene Fowler, Marjorie Fowler and Anthony Wollner	CBS
1973 (25th)	M*A*S*H		Fred W. Berger and Stanford Tischler	CBS
1973 (25th)	The Mary Tyler Moore Show		Douglas Hines	CBS
1974 (26th)
1974 (26th)	The Blue Knight		Samuel E. Beetley, Gene Fowler and Marjorie Fowler	NBC
1974 (26th)	M*A*S*H		Fred W. Berger and Stanford Tischler	CBS
1974 (26th)	The Mary Tyler Moore Show		Douglas Hines and Bud S. Isaacs	CBS

Outstanding Film Editing for a Single Episode of a Comedy Series

Year	Program	Episode	Nominee(s)	Network
1975 (27th)
1975 (27th)	The Mary Tyler Moore Show	"An Affair to Forget"	Douglas Hines	CBS
1975 (27th)	M*A*S*H	"The General Flipped at Dawn"	Fred W. Berger and Stanford Tischler	CBS
1976 (28th)
1976 (28th)	M*A*S*H	"Welcome to Korea"	Fred W. Berger and Stanford Tischler	CBS
1976 (28th)	The Mary Tyler Moore Show	"Chuckles Bites the Dust"	Douglas Hines	CBS
1977 (29th)
1977 (29th)	The Mary Tyler Moore Show	"Murray Can't Lose"	Douglas Hines	CBS
1977 (29th)	M*A*S*H	"Dear Sigmund"	Samuel E. Beetley and Stanford Tischler	CBS
1978 (30th)
1978 (30th)	Happy Days	"Richie Almost Dies"	Ed Cotter	ABC
1978 (30th)	The Bob Newhart Show	"A Jackie Story"	M. Pam Blumenthal	CBS
1978 (30th)	The Love Boat	"Masquerade/The Caper/Eyes of Love/Hollywood Royalty"	Norman Wallerstein and Robert Moore	ABC
1978 (30th)	M*A*S*H	"Fade Out, Fade In"	Larry L. Mills and Stanford Tischler	CBS

Outstanding Film Editing for a Series

Year	Program	Episode	Nominee(s)	Network
1979 (31st)
1979 (31st)	Taxi	"Paper Marriage"	M. Pam Blumenthal	ABC
1979 (31st)	Dallas	"Reunion, Part 2"	Fred W. Berger	CBS
1979 (31st)	Lou Grant	"Hooker"	James Galloway	CBS
1979 (31st)	M*A*S*H	"The Billfold Syndrome"	Stanford Tischler and Larry L. Mills	CBS

=== 1980s ===
Year	Program	Episode	Nominee(s)	Network
1980 (32nd)
1980 (32nd)	Taxi	"Louie and the Nice Girl"	M. Pam Blumenthal	ABC
1980 (32nd)	M*A*S*H	"The Yalu Brick Road"	Stanford Tischler and Larry L. Mills	CBS
1980 (32nd)	Skag	"Pilot"	Sidney Katz	NBC
1980 (32nd)	Skag	"The Working Girl, Part 1"	Larry Strong	NBC
1981 (33rd)
1981 (33rd)	Taxi	"Elaine's Strange Triangle"	M. Pam Blumenthal and Jack Michon	ABC
1981 (33rd)	Dallas	"Ewing-Gate"	Fred W. Berger	CBS
1981 (33rd)	Dynasty	"The Dinner Party"	Dick Darling	ABC
1981 (33rd)	The Greatest American Hero	"Pilot"	Christopher Nelson	ABC
1981 (33rd)	Hill Street Blues	"Hill Street Station"	Ray Daniels and A. David Marshall	NBC
1981 (33rd)	Hill Street Blues	"Jungle Madness"	Clay Bartels	NBC
1981 (33rd)	Hill Street Blues	"Rites of Spring"	Tom Stevens	NBC
1981 (33rd)	Lou Grant	"Strike"	James Galloway	CBS
1981 (33rd)	M*A*S*H	"Death Takes a Holiday"	Stanford Tischler and Larry L. Mills	CBS
1981 (33rd)	Palmerstown, U.S.A.	"Crossroads"	Bernard Balmuth	CBS
1981 (33rd)	The White Shadow	"A Day in the Life"	Tony de Zarraga	CBS
1982 (34th)
1982 (34th)	Hill Street Blues	"Of Mouse and Man"	Andrew Chulack	NBC
1982 (34th)	Dallas	"The Split"	Fred W. Berger	CBS
1982 (34th)	Fame	"Musical Bridge"	Mark Melnick	NBC
1982 (34th)	Fame	"Passing Grade"	Michael A. Hoey	NBC
1982 (34th)	Hill Street Blues	"The Second Oldest Profession"	Ray Daniels	NBC
1982 (34th)	Quincy, M.E.	"For Love of Joshua"	Jeanene Ambler	NBC
1983 (35th)
1983 (35th)	Hill Street Blues	"Phantom of the Hill"	Ray Daniels	NBC
1983 (35th)	Cheers	"Endless Slumper"	Andrew Chulack	NBC
1983 (35th)	Dallas	"Ewing's Inferno"	Fred W. Berger	CBS
1983 (35th)	Dynasty	"La Mirage"	Bob Blake	ABC
1983 (35th)	M*A*S*H	"Goodbye, Farewell and Amen"	Stanford Tischler and Larry L. Mills	CBS
1983 (35th)	Matt Houston	"The Showgirl Murders"	Bob Bring	ABC
1983 (35th)	Quincy, M.E.	"Quincy's Wedding, Part 2"	Jeanene Ambler	NBC
1984 (36th)
1984 (36th)	Cheers	"Old Flames"	Andrew Chulack	NBC
1984 (36th)	Cagney & Lacey	"The Baby Broker"	Millie Moore	CBS
1984 (36th)	Cagney & Lacey	"Choices"	Geoffrey Rowland	CBS
1984 (36th)	Hill Street Blues	"Parting Is Such Sweep Sorrow"	Ray Daniels	NBC
1984 (36th)	Simon & Simon	"Double Play"	Larry Heath	CBS
1985 (37th)
1985 (37th)	Cagney & Lacey	"Who Said It's Fair?, Part 2"	Jim Gross	CBS
1985 (37th)	Crazy Like a Fox	"Pilot"	J. Terry Williams	CBS
1985 (37th)	Miami Vice	"Evan"	Robert A. Daniels	NBC
1985 (37th)	Miami Vice	"Smuggler's Blues"	Michael B. Hoggan	NBC
1985 (37th)	Murder, She Wrote	"The Murder of Sherlock Holmes"	Donald Douglas	CBS

=== 2000s ===
Outstanding Picture Editing for a Comedy Series (Single or Multi-Camera)

Year	Program	Episode	Nominee(s)	Network
2003 (55th)	Malcolm in the Middle	"If Boys Were Girls"	Mark Scheib and Steve Welch	Fox
2003 (55th)	Curb Your Enthusiasm	"The Corpse Sniffing Dog"	Steven Rasch	HBO
2003 (55th)	Curb Your Enthusiasm	"Krazee-Eyez Killa"	Jon Corn	HBO
2003 (55th)	Sex and the City	"Anchors Away"	Wendey Stanzler	HBO
2003 (55th)	Sex and the City	"Luck Be an Old Lady"	Michael Berenbaum	HBO
2004 (56th)	Arrested Development	"Pilot"	Lee Haxall	Fox
2004 (56th)	Curb Your Enthusiasm	"Opening Night"	Steven Rasch	HBO
2004 (56th)	Curb Your Enthusiasm	"The Survivor"	Jon Corn	HBO
2004 (56th)	Scrubs	"My Screw Up"	John Michel	NBC
2004 (56th)	Sex and the City	"An American Girl in Paris"	Michael Berenbaum and Wendey Stanzler	HBO
2005 (57th)	Desperate Housewives	"Pilot"	Michael Berenbaum	ABC
2005 (57th)	Arrested Development	"Good Grief"	Richard Candib	Fox
2005 (57th)	Arrested Development	"Let 'Em Eat Cake"	Steven Sprung	Fox
2005 (57th)	Arrested Development	"Motherboy XXX"	Robert Bramwell	Fox
2005 (57th)	Desperate Housewives	"Pretty Little Picture"	Jonathan Posell	ABC
2006 (58th)	My Name Is Earl	"Ruined Joy's Wedding"	Lance Luckey	NBC
2006 (58th)	Arrested Development	"The Ocean Walker"	Stuart Bass	Fox
2006 (58th)	Curb Your Enthusiasm	"The Ski Lift"	Steven Rasch	HBO
2006 (58th)	Desperate Housewives	"That's Good, That's Bad"	Nancy Morrison	ABC
2006 (58th)	The Office	"Booze Cruise"	Dean Holland	NBC
2006 (58th)	The Office	"Christmas Party"	David Rogers	NBC
2006 (58th)	Weeds	"Good Shit Lollipop"	David Helfand	Showtime
2007 (59th)	The Office	"The Job"	Dean Holland and David Rogers	NBC
2007 (59th)	My Name Is Earl	"Guess Who's Coming Out of Joy"	Lance Luckey	NBC
2007 (59th)	My Name Is Earl	"The Trial"	William Marrinson	NBC
2007 (59th)	Weeds	"Crush Girl Love Panic"	Bill Turro	Showtime
2007 (59th)	Weeds	"Ms. Botwin's Neighborhood"	David Helfand	Showtime
2008 (60th)	Pushing Daisies	"Pie-lette"	Stuart Bass	ABC
2008 (60th)	Curb Your Enthusiasm	"The Bat Mitzvah"	Steven Rasch	HBO
2008 (60th)	The Office	"Goodbye, Toby"	Dean Holland and David Rogers	NBC
2008 (60th)	30 Rock	"Cooter"	Ken Eluto	NBC
2008 (60th)	Weeds	"A Pool and His Money"	Bill Turro	Showtime
2009 (61st)	30 Rock	"Apollo, Apollo"	Ken Eluto	NBC
2009 (61st)	How I Met Your Mother	"The Naked Man"	Susan Federman	CBS
2009 (61st)	The Office	"Dream Team"	Claire Scanlon	NBC
2009 (61st)	The Office	"Stress Relief"	Dean Holland and David Rogers	NBC
2009 (61st)	The Office	"Two Weeks"	Stuart Bass	NBC

=== 2010s ===
Year	Program	Episode	Nominee(s)	Network
2010 (62nd)	Modern Family	"Pilot"	Ryan Case	ABC
2010 (62nd)	Curb Your Enthusiasm	"The Bare Midriff"	Steven Rasch	HBO
2010 (62nd)	Curb Your Enthusiasm	"The Table Read"	Jonathan Corn and Roger Nygard	HBO
2010 (62nd)	Modern Family	"Family Portrait"	Jonathan Schwartz	ABC
2010 (62nd)	30 Rock	"Dealbreakers Talk Show #0001"	Ken Eluto	NBC
2011 (63rd)	How I Met Your Mother	"Subway Wars"	Susan Federman	CBS
2011 (63rd)	The Big Bang Theory	"The Agreement Dissection"	Peter Chakos	CBS
2011 (63rd)	Modern Family	"Halloween"	Ryan Case	ABC
2011 (63rd)	Modern Family	"Slow Down Your Neighbors"	Jonathan Schwartz	ABC
2011 (63rd)	30 Rock	"100"	Meg Reticker	NBC

Outstanding Single-Camera Picture Editing for a Comedy Series

Year	Program	Episode	Nominee(s)	Network
2012 (64th)	Curb Your Enthusiasm	"Palestinian Chicken"	Steven Rasch	HBO
2012 (64th)	Modern Family	"Election Day"	Steven Rasch	ABC
2012 (64th)	Modern Family	"Leap Day"	Ryan Case	ABC
2012 (64th)	30 Rock	"Leap Day"	Meg Reticker	NBC
2012 (64th)	30 Rock	"The Tuxedo Begins"	Ken Eluto	NBC
2013 (65th)	The Office	"Finale"	David Rogers and Claire Scanlon	NBC
2013 (65th)	Arrested Development	"Flight of the Phoenix"	Kabir Akhtar and A.J. Dickerson	Netflix
2013 (65th)	Louie	"Daddy's Girlfriend, Part 2"	Susan E. Morse	FX
2013 (65th)	Modern Family	"Party Crasher"	Ryan Case	ABC
2013 (65th)	30 Rock	"Hogcock!" / "Last Lunch"	Ken Eluto and Meg Reticker	NBC
2014 (66th)	Orange Is the New Black	"Tit Punch"	William Turro	Netflix
2014 (66th)	Modern Family	"Las Vegas"	Ryan Case	ABC
2014 (66th)	Orange Is the New Black	"Can't Fix Crazy"	Michael S. Stern	Netflix
2014 (66th)	Orange Is the New Black	"Tall Men With Feelings"	Shannon Mitchell	Netflix
2014 (66th)	Portlandia	"Getting Away"	Bill Benz and Daniel Gray Longino	IFC
2015 (67th)	Silicon Valley	"Two Days of the Condor"	Brian Merken	HBO
2015 (67th)	Inside Amy Schumer	"Last Fuckable Day"	Jesse Gordon, Nick Paley, Billy Song and Laura Weinberg	Comedy Central
2015 (67th)	The Last Man on Earth	"Alive in Tucson"	Stacey Schroeder	Fox
2015 (67th)	Silicon Valley	"Sand Hill Shuffle"	Tim Roche	HBO
2015 (67th)	Transparent	"Pilot"	Catherine Haight	Amazon
2016 (68th)
2016 (68th)	Crazy Ex-Girlfriend	"Josh Just Happens to Live Here!"	Kabir Akhtar	The CW
2016 (68th)	Silicon Valley	"Daily Active Users"	Tim Roche	HBO
2016 (68th)	Silicon Valley	"The Uptick"	Brian Merken	HBO
2016 (68th)	Veep	"Inauguration"	Steven Rasch	HBO
2016 (68th)	Veep	"Mother"	Shawn Paper	HBO
2017 (69th)
2017 (69th)	Master of None	"The Thief"	Jennifer Lilly	Netflix
2017 (69th)	Silicon Valley	"Server Error"	Brian Merken	HBO
2017 (69th)	Silicon Valley	"Success Failure"	Tim Roche	HBO
2017 (69th)	Veep	"Chicklet"	Roger Nygard and Gennady Fridman	HBO
2017 (69th)	Veep	"Groundbreaking"	Eric Kissack	HBO
2018 (70th)
2018 (70th)	The Marvelous Mrs. Maisel	"Pilot"	Brian A. Kates	Amazon
2018 (70th)	Atlanta	"Alligator Man"	Isaac Hagy	FX
2018 (70th)	Atlanta	"Teddy Perkins"	Kyle Reiter	FX
2018 (70th)	Barry	"Chapter Eight: Know Your Truth"	Kyle Reiter	HBO
2018 (70th)	Barry	"Chapter Seven: Loud, Fast, and Keep Going"	Jeff Buchanan	HBO
2019 (71st)
2019 (71st)	Fleabag	"Episode 1"	Gary Dollner	Amazon
2019 (71st)	Barry	"berkman ﹥ block"	Kyle Reiter	HBO
2019 (71st)	Barry	"ronny/lily"	Jeff Buchanan	HBO
2019 (71st)	Russian Doll	"Ariadne"	Laura Weinberg	Netflix
2019 (71st)	The Marvelous Mrs. Maisel	"Simone"	Kate Sanford	Amazon
2019 (71st)	The Marvelous Mrs. Maisel	"We're Going to the Catskills!"	Tim Streeto	Amazon

=== 2020s ===
Year	Program	Episode	Nominee(s)	Network
2020 (72nd)
2020 (72nd)	Insecure	"Lowkey Trying"	Nena Erb and Lynarion Hubbard	HBO
2020 (72nd)	Curb Your Enthusiasm	"Elizabeth, Margaret and Larry"	Steve Rasch	HBO
2020 (72nd)	The Marvelous Mrs. Maisel	"A Jewish Girl Walks Into the Apollo..."	Kate Sanford and Tim Streeto	Prime Video
2020 (72nd)	Schitt's Creek	"Happy Ending"	Trevor Ambrose	Pop TV
2020 (72nd)	Schitt's Creek	"Start Spreading the News"	Paul Winestock	Pop TV
2020 (72nd)	What We Do in the Shadows	"Resurrection"	Yana Gorskaya and Dane McMaster	FX
2021 (73rd)
2021 (73rd)	Ted Lasso	"The Hope That Kills You"	A.J. Catoline	Apple TV+
2021 (73rd)	The Flight Attendant	"In Case of Emergency"	Heather Persons	HBO Max
2021 (73rd)	Hacks	"Primm"	Susan Vaill	HBO Max
2021 (73rd)	Hacks	"There Is No Line"	Jessica Brunetto	HBO Max
2021 (73rd)	Hacks	"Tunnel of Love"	Ali Greer	HBO Max
2021 (73rd)	Ted Lasso	"Make Rebecca Great Again"	Melissa McCoy	Apple TV+
2022 (74th)
2022 (74th)	Barry	"starting now"	Ali Greer	HBO
2022 (74th)	Hacks	"There Will Be Blood"	Jessica Brunetto	HBO Max
2022 (74th)	Insecure	"Choices, Okay?!"	Nena Erb	HBO
2022 (74th)	Only Murders in the Building	"Fan Fiction"	JoAnne Marie Yarrow	Hulu
2022 (74th)	Only Murders in the Building	"Open and Shut"	Julie Monroe	Hulu
2022 (74th)	Ted Lasso	"No Weddings and a Funeral"	A.J. Catoline	Apple TV+
2022 (74th)	Ted Lasso	"Rainbow"	Melissa McCoy	Apple TV+
2023 (75th)
2023 (75th)	The Bear	"System"	Joanna Naugle	FX
2023 (75th)	Barry	"wow"	Franky Guttman and Ali Greer	HBO
2023 (75th)	Only Murders in the Building	"The Last Day of Bunny Folger"	Peggy Tachdjian	Hulu
2023 (75th)	Ted Lasso	"Mom City"	A.J. Catoline and Alex Szabo	Apple TV+
2023 (75th)	Ted Lasso	"So Long, Farewell"	Melissa McCoy and Francesca Castro	Apple TV+
2023 (75th)	What We Do in the Shadows	"Go Flip Yourself"	Yana Gorskaya and Dane McMaster	FX
2024 (76th)
2024 (76th)	The Bear	"Fishes"	Joanna Naugle	FX
2024 (76th)	Hacks	"The Deborah Vance Christmas Spectacular"	Jess Brunetto	Max
2024 (76th)	Only Murders in the Building	"Sitzprobe"	Shelly Westerman and Payton Koch	Hulu
2024 (76th)	Only Murders in the Building	"The White Room"	Peggy Tachdjian	Hulu
2024 (76th)	Reservation Dogs	"Dig"	Patrick Tuck and Varun Viswanath	FX
2024 (76th)	What We Do in the Shadows	"Pride Parade"	Liza Cardinale and A.J. Dickerson	FX
2025 (77th)
2025 (77th)	The Studio	"The Promotion"	Eric Kissack	Apple TV+
2025 (77th)	The Bear	"Tomorrow"	Joanna Naugle	FX
2025 (77th)	Hacks	"I Love L.A."	Susan Vaill	HBO Max
2025 (77th)	The Rehearsal	"My Controls"	Adam Locke-Norton	HBO
2025 (77th)	The Rehearsal	"Pilot's Code"	Stacy Moon	HBO
2025 (77th)	What We Do in the Shadows	"The Finale"	Yana Gorskaya, Dane McMaster, Liza Cardinale, and Matthew Freund	FX
2026 (78th)
2026 (78th)	Hacks	"Hacks"	Jon Philpot	HBO Max
2026 (78th)	The Bear	"Bears"	Joanna Naugle	FX
2026 (78th)	Hacks	"The Cube"	Peggy Tachdjian	HBO Max
2026 (78th)	Widow's Bay	"Our History"	Isaac Hagy	Apple TV
2026 (78th)	Widow's Bay	"Welcome to Widow's Bay"	Kyle Reiter	Apple TV
2026 (78th)	Widow's Bay	"What to Expect on Your Trip"	Jen Bryson	Apple TV

== Editors with multiple awards ==
3 awards

- M. Pam Blumenthal

2 awards

- Andrew Chulack
- Gene Fowler
- Marjorie Fowler
- Douglas Hines
- Joanna Naugle
- David Rogers

== Programs with multiple awards ==
3 wins

- Taxi

2 wins

- The Bear
- The Mary Tyler Moore Show
- The Office

== Editors with multiple nominations ==
9 nominations

- Steve Rasch

8 nominations

- Fred W. Berger

6 nominations

- Stanford Tischler

5 nominations

- Ryan Case
- Ken Eluto
- Douglas Hines
- Larry L. Mills
- David Rogers

4 nominations

- M. Pam Blumenthal
- Ray Daniels
- Dean Holland
- Joanna Naugle
- Kyle Reiter

3 nominations

- Stuart Bass
- Michael Berenbaum
- A.J. Catoline
- Andrew Chulack
- Jon Corn
- Yana Gorskaya
- Melissa McCoy
- Dane McMaster
- Brian Merken
- Meg Reticker
- Tim Roche
- Peggy Tachdjian
- Bill Turro

2 nominations

- Kabir Akhtar
- Jeanene Ambler
- Samuel E. Beetley
- Jessica Brunetto
- Jeff Buchanan
- Liza Cardinale
- Nina Erb
- Susan Federman
- Gene Fowler
- Marjorie Fowler
- James Galloway
- Ali Greer
- Isaac Hagy
- David Helfand
- Arthur David Hilton
- Eric Kissack
- Lance Luckey
- Roger Nygard
- Kate Sanford
- Claire Scanlon
- Jonathan Schwartz
- Wendey Stanzler
- Tim Streeto
- Susan Vaill
- Laura Weinberg
- J. Terry Williams

== Programs with multiple nominations ==
10 nominations

- Curb Your Enthusiasm
- M*A*S*H

8 nominations

- Hacks
- Modern Family
- The Office

7 nominations

- 30 Rock

6 nominations

- Arrested Development
- Barry
- Silicon Valley
- Ted Lasso

5 nominations

- The Mary Tyler Moore Show
- Only Murders in the Building

4 nominations

- The Bear
- The Marvelous Mrs. Maisel
- Veep
- Weeds
- What We Do in the Shadows

3 nominations

- Desperate Housewives
- My Name Is Earl
- Orange Is the New Black
- Sex and the City
- Taxi
- Widow's Bay

2 nominations

- Atlanta
- Cheers
- How I Met Your Mother
- Insecure
- The Rehearsal
- Schitt's Creek
