= Lodging (Widow's Bay) =

- Widow's Bay episode
- Episode no.: Season 1 Episode 2
- Directed by: Hiro Murai
- Written by: Kelly Galuska
- Cinematography by: Christian Sprenger
- Editing by: Jen Bryson
- Original release date: April 29, 2026
- Running time: 37 minutes

Guest appearances
- Tim Baltz as William; K Callan as Ruth Livingston; Neil Casey as Kurt; Olli Haaskivi as Ray; Toby Huss as Reverend Bryce; Nancy Lenehan as Gerrie Doyle; Sipiwe Moyo as Chelle

Episode chronology
← Previous "Welcome to Widow's Bay"	Next → "The Inaugural Swim"

"Lodging" is the second episode of the American comedy horror Widow's Bay. The episode was written by co-executive producer Kelly Galuska, and directed by executive producer Hiro Murai. It was released on Apple TV in the United States on April 29, 2026.

The series is set in the fictional New England island town of Widow's Bay, which is afflicted by a centuries-old curse that brings various supernatural evils upon the island. Mayor Tom Loftis wants to make a good impression in order to raise awareness for tourism in town, while also trying to uncover the mysteries surrounding the area. In the episode, Tom agrees to stay in an inn, where people claim it is haunted, in order to avoid problems with the incoming tourists.

The episode received mostly positive reviews from critics, who praised Murai's directing, dark tone and cinematography.

== Plot ==
The New York Times article is published, and Tom is confident that tourists will visit the town soon. However, Wyck causes panic by claiming that tourists should not stay at the Breakwater Inn, so Tom has Sheriff Bechir Clemmons arrest him. A few townspeople mock Tom for refusing to acknowledge the inn might be haunted, so he accepts a challenge in staying that night at the inn. The church bell rings nine times in the middle of the night despite being chained up, prompting Reverend Bryce to consult an old warning of what to do if this happens.

Tom arrives at the inn, and is surprised when the innkeeper, Kurt, leaves, leaving him as the only guest in the inn. As part of the challenge, Tom documents everything with a camera, while staying at different rooms where crimes took place. He soon starts noting strange events, such as a malfunctioning TV showing the same image, curtains that open by themselves, and voices emerging from an air vent. He is surprised to meet another guest, William, who invites him to take a few drinks. Tom opens up about his past and his struggles as mayor, and William surprises him by supporting him and scolding the townspeople. As another challenge, Tom descends to a crawl space, when he hears William outside. Suddenly, William enters aggressively wearing a clown make-up, forcing Tom to retreat. However, this is revealed to be a nightmare for Tom.

The next morning, Tom consults with Bechir and Kurt about William, but security footage only shows Tom interacting alone. Kurt briefly enters the room and emerges believing he had been trapped inside far longer than he actually was. Inspecting the room, Bechir finds black mold, deducing this is the cause of Tom's behavior through the night, with Kurt promising to close it while it is cleaned. Wyck refuses to believe that this could be the explanation, but Tom accepts the explanation. When his assistant Patricia picks him up, Tom reports that everything went well, planning to go forward with his tourism plans.

== Production ==
=== Development ===
The episode was written by co-executive producer Kelly Galuska, and directed by executive producer Hiro Murai. It marked Galuska's first writing credit, and Murai's second directing credit.

== Critical reviews ==
"Lodging" earned mostly positive reviews from critics. Jen Chaney of Vulture gave the 2-episode premiere a 4 star rating out of 5 and wrote, "Tom's stay at the inn in “Lodging” contains several more horror-movie allusions, including a shot of Tom's arrival to the inn that's reminiscent of Psycho, a story about a deadly New Year's Eve party that calls to mind The Shining, and a visit from a clown killer from the 1950s that smacks of Stephen King's It. I love the idea that pretty much every tale of horror can be traced back to Widow's Bay."

Sean T. Collins of Decider wrote, "Two episodes deep into Widow's Bay, I'm starting to understand just how fruitful an approach this whole “is it funny, or, if you stop and think about it, is it actually deeply disturbing?” thing is going to be." Bryce Olin of Show Snob wrote, "There's absolutely no question that, at the very least, the inn is haunted. Most likely, the issue extends to the whole island. What will Tom's next move be?"

Carissa Pavlica of TV Fanatic gave the 2-episode premiere a 4 star rating out of 5 and wrote, "Episode 1 makes it feel like an adventure. Episode 2 makes it feel like a risk. And if Widow's Bay can keep balancing those two things without tipping too far in either direction, then maybe this strange little town has exactly the kind of staying power Tom has been chasing all along." Christine Kinori of The Review Geek wrote, "The episode tones down the comedy and amps up the horror element. By the end of the episode, something has shifted in Tom. He is no longer laughing off the weird happenings in town. He is visibly scared!"
