= Your Baggage =

- Widow's Bay episode
- Episode no.: Season 1 Episode 8
- Directed by: Andrew DeYoung
- Written by: Emma Ketchum
- Cinematography by: Cody Jacobs
- Editing by: Jing Hang; Kyle Reiter
- Original release date: June 3, 2026
- Running time: 34 minutes

Guest appearances
- Lauren Bittner as Kris; K Callan as Ruth Livingston; Emily Davis as Shelby; Jeff Hiller as Dale; Nancy Lenehan as Gerrie Doyle; Sipiwe Moyo as Chelle

Episode chronology
← Previous "Seasickness"	Next → "Emergency Shelter"

"Your Baggage" is the eighth episode of the American comedy horror Widow's Bay. The episode was written by Emma Ketchum, and directed by Andrew DeYoung. It was released on Apple TV in the United States on June 3, 2026.

The series is set in the fictional New England island town of Widow's Bay, which is afflicted by a centuries-old curse that brings various supernatural evils upon the island. Mayor Tom Loftis wants to make a good impression in order to raise awareness for tourism in town, while also trying to uncover the mysteries surrounding the area. In the episode, Tom explains his wife's past to Evan, while Patricia realizes the Boogeyman might be back.

The episode earned critical acclaim, with critics praising Kate O'Flynn's performance, tone, and cinematography.

== Plot ==
In the morning, Tom, Wyck and Patricia celebrate the end of the curse, with Tom stating he will take Evan to a Boston Red Sox game for the first time. When he goes home that night, Evan confronts him over his mother's real status. Tom admits that she suffered a stroke during childbirth that left her mentally unstable and confined to an asylum on the island, where she later died of an aneurysm. They reconcile, with Tom making clear his plans to go to Boston.

The mask of the serial killer known as the Boogeyman is stolen from the museum. At home, Patricia goes outside to turn off her car's alarm, when she begins to feel uneasy about a presence in her house. Suddenly, the Boogeyman appears, chasing her through the neighborhood. She eventually reaches the house of Kris and her former classmates, who refuse to believe her. Patricia admits she falsely claimed to receive threatening calls during the original killings as a teenager but insists the rest of her story was true. When Kris condescendingly asks her to leave, Patricia tasers her before leaving. The Boogeyman appears in Kris's house and jumps through a second-story window to pursue Patricia. He catches up to her, but a vehicle hits him. Patricia flees as the Boogeyman kills a paramedic.

Patricia reaches a gas station, where Bechir happens to be shopping. She uses the taser to ignite a stream of gasoline and set the Boogeyman on fire, but he survives long enough to assault the station attendant and wound Bechir before Patricia fatally shoots him with a shotgun, though she remains suspicious of his ability to resurrect until witnessing his cremation firsthand. When she learns that Bechir's wife is pregnant, she urges him to not let the child be born in town, as he will never be able to leave. Wyck visits Tom at his house, telling him the curse is not over as a storm approaches town.

== Production ==
=== Development ===
The episode was written by Emma Ketchum, and directed by Andrew DeYoung. It marked Ketchum's first writing credit, and DeYoung's second directing credit.

=== Writing ===
Series creator Katie Dippold was interested in deviating from the prior episodes, saying "I wanted to do an episode that was just watching this 40-year-old woman run around the neighborhood being chased by this man. That sounded like a fun challenge." Nevertheless, she felt it was essential that the "weirdos" in town would contribute to the story, "As much as we're going into the different horror tropes, I really wanted it to all be about the characters." Kate O'Flynn was surprised when she received the episode, as it would bring the Boogeyman as the focus, but she added that she was very interested in depicting Patricia in a new light, "I was really glad that you see her quite powerful, and in a very Patricia way, really making sure he's dead."

Kate O'Flynn addressed Patricia's confession about lying about surviving as a teenager, "She has this fear of not being believed, which then causes her to lie, which then causes her to not be believed. She just has that knee-jerk response, which is totally recognizable. You go, “I've not had the same experience as everyone else, but I need people to believe me, so I'll just get on board with that.” That form of tying herself into knots is very Patricia." She also explained her decision to taser Kris, "She's done it. She's burnt her bridges. You can't come back from that. She's tasered someone. She doesn't care anymore. And she sees the bigger picture. She's managed to shed that need for this validation from these bunch of women who are really mean."

== Critical reviews ==
"Your Baggage" earned critical acclaim. Jen Chaney of Vulture gave the episode a perfect 5 star rating out of 5 and wrote, "“Your Baggage” is, like “Beach Reads,” an exploration of how society ignores women even when they're screaming, quite literally, for someone to protect them. What is a better visual metaphor for being a woman in America than the sight of Patricia tearing through the streets of Widow's Bay, shrieking for help and finding none, while an out-of-shape freak stalks her and somehow manages to catch up to her?"

Cheryl Eddy of Gizmodo wrote, "As the episode ends, Tom and Evan — finally back on good terms — are excitedly talking about their upcoming trip to Boston when there's a knock at the door. It's Wyck, of course, and we already know what he’s going to say: “It's not over.” The sounds of the storm begin to howl and rumble. What will this evil island unleash next?" Eric Francisco of Esquire wrote, "Even if you don't love horror, you have to give it to Widow's Bay for how much it does. Spending a late-game episode to play with the very specific subgenre of slasher flicks and still segueing into the season's climax is one hell of a high-wire act. But luck is on Widow's Bay's side, because “Your Baggage” is a near-perfect breather after last week's doubleheader that puts the spotlight back on the series's MVP, Patricia, played by the effervescent Kate O'Flynn."

Sean T. Collins of Decider wrote, "I want a full-on Shirley Jackson “The Lottery” situation. I want villagers with torches and pitchforks. I want some kind of horrible betrayal that will make me hate one of these adorable weirdos. I want more beautifully filmed nighttime exteriors, filled with rich patches of black in which even darker things lurk. I want my Widow's Bay." Bryce Olin of Show Snob wrote, "From my perspective, it's starting to look like the island is fighting back. So, that means that we're probably going to see Tom, Wyck, and Patricia put together a new plan to stop this curse in episode 9."

Carissa Pavlica of TV Fanatic gave the episode a 4.9 star rating out of 5 and wrote, "This was easily one of my favorite episodes of TV this year. It speaks to my horror-loving heart and doesn't skimp on emotion either." Christine Kinori of The Review Geek gave the episode a 4 star rating out of 5 and wrote, "What is interesting is how the writers continue the themes of emotional and communal baggage in the show. Tom thought he was finally free and unburdened himself of the emotional baggage he had been carrying around when Evan confronted him. Patricia is forced to come clean about her messy lie. However, we get to see how the lie bred scepticism. In the end, no one comes to her aid because they don't trust her."
