= Kingston Rumi Southwick =

American actor

- Born: 2008 (age 17–18); Los Angeles, California, U.S.
- Occupation: Actor
- Years active: 2013–present

Kingston Rumi Southwick (born 2008) is an American actor. He is known for playing Kyle Sabich in the Apple TV+ legal thriller series Presumed Innocent (2024) and Evan Loftis in the Apple TV comedy horror series Widow's Bay (2026).

== Early life ==
Southwick was born and raised in Los Angeles. He developed an interest in acting and filmmaking while growing up in Los Angeles. He made his first film appearance as a child in the independent film 9 Full Moons, appearing alongside Amy Seimetz, Harry Dean Stanton, Donal Logue and Pamela Adlon.

== Career ==
Southwick returned to acting as a teenager. In 2024, he played Kyle Sabich, the son of Rusty and Barbara Sabich, portrayed by Jake Gyllenhaal and Ruth Negga, respectively, in the Apple TV legal thriller Presumed Innocent. Southwick appeared throughout the eight-episode first season. He subsequently appeared as Jaden in the second season of the Peacock series Based on a True Story.

In 2026, Southwick appeared as the younger version of Oliver, the character played by Avan Jogia, in the thriller series 56 Days.

Later that year, Southwick joined the main cast of the Apple TV comedy horror series Widow's Bay, created by Katie Dippold. He portrays Evan Loftis, the rebellious teenage son of Mayor Tom Loftis, played by Matthew Rhys.

Southwick told Esquire that he wanted to avoid portraying Evan simply as a stereotypical rebellious teenager and was attracted to the character's development over the course of the series. His storyline became increasingly prominent as the first season progressed, with the season finale setting up an expanded role for Evan in the second season.

Southwick developed a close working relationship with Rhys during production. In an interview with People, he said that Rhys treated him as an equal during filming and gave him freedom to experiment with his performance. The two remained in contact after production.

== Filmography ==
=== Film ===
Year	Title	Role	Notes
2013	9 Full Moons	Josh Stevens	
TBA	Henry's Ebb	Henry	

=== Television ===
Year	Title	Role	Notes
2024	Presumed Innocent	Kyle Sabich	Main role; 8 episodes
2024	Based on a True Story	Jaden	2 episodes
2026	56 Days	Young Oliver	3 episodes
2026–present	Widow's Bay	Evan Loftis	Main role
