= Welcome to Widow's Bay =

- Widow's Bay episode
- Episode no.: Season 1 Episode 1
- Directed by: Hiro Murai
- Written by: Katie Dippold
- Cinematography by: Christian Sprenger
- Editing by: Kyle Reiter
- Original release date: April 29, 2026
- Running time: 41 minutes

Guest appearances
- K Callan as Ruth Livingston; Christian Clemenson as Dr. Morgan; William Hill as Wayne; Jeff Hiller as Dale; Nancy Lenehan as Gerrie Doyle; Bashir Salahuddin as Arthur Lloyd

Episode chronology
| ← Previous — | Next → "Lodging" |

"Welcome to Widow's Bay!" is the series premiere of the American comedy horror Widow's Bay. The episode was written by series creator Katie Dippold, and directed by executive producer Hiro Murai. It was released on Apple TV in the United States on April 29, 2026.

The series is set in the fictional New England island town of Widow's Bay, which is afflicted by a centuries-old curse that brings various supernatural evils upon the island. Mayor Tom Loftis wants to make a good impression in order to raise awareness for tourism in town, while also trying to uncover the mysteries surrounding the area.

The series premiere received mostly positive reviews from critics, who praised the performances, direction and atmosphere. Dippold won the Primetime Emmy Award for Outstanding Writing for a Comedy Series, while Murai won the Primetime Emmy Award for Outstanding Directing for a Comedy Series.

== Plot ==
Near the New England island town of Widow's Bay, fisherman Shep Clark loses sight from his boat. Subsequently, he notices a fog engulfing his boat. The town is then affected by a blackout followed by a lengthy tremor, the first in twenty years.

Mayor Tom Loftis tries to maintain calmness during the day, as he is expecting Arthur Lloyd, a visiting New York Times journalist. Tom hopes to make a good impression in order to increase tourism for the town, but his nervousness worries the rest of his staff. Civilian Wyck Crawford raises his concerns to Tom and his staff, believing that a curse is plaguing the town, but Tom dismisses his claims. Tom also struggles to raise his teenage son Evan, whose mother died some time ago and is often bored as there is nothing to do in town.

After Wyck rings the town's siren, Tom finally agrees to hear his concerns. Wyck states that the fog and tremor are signs that the island is "waking up" and that Tom needs to shut everything down. When Tom believes that Wyck's behavior is because he does not trust his leadership, Wyck brings up that Tom used to play door-knocking with his house with his friends; he knows Tom lied about it, and that makes him question his leadership. Shep then reappears, and is taken to the hospital. When Tom visits him, Shep awakens with white eyes and attacks him. Shep loses consciousness, and doctors are unable to resuscitate him.

Tom becomes paranoid, and gets nervous while dining with Arthur. To his surprise, Arthur liked the town and is curious about the strange events surrounding it. Tom notices the fog approaching and the town suffers another blackout. Tom tries to prevent people from leaving into the mist, until the lights come back and the fog disappears. Deep underground, a basement is seen containing a chair with restraints and a large cellar door.

== Production ==
=== Development ===
The episode was written by series creator Katie Dippold, and directed by executive producer Hiro Murai.

== Reception ==
=== Critical reviews ===
"Welcome to Widow's Bay!" earned mostly positive reviews from critics. Jen Chaney of Vulture gave the 2-episode premiere a 4 star rating out of 5 and wrote, "The first episode establishes immediately that something is uniquely off about Widow's Bay, and not just because Shep, a shipman patrolling the waters at night, goes missing, potentially because he's been taken by a sinister fog."

Sean T. Collins of Decider wrote, "Widow's Bay is like Stranger Things if it had the smarts to be satirical. Dippold's expertly targeted script draws on many of the same reference points as the Netflix blockbuster, though it's more Stephen King than Steven Spielberg." Bryce Olin of Show Snob wrote, "Overall, Widow's Bay is off to an incredible start. This is easily one of the most interesting new Apple TV shows we've ever seen, and I can't wait to see where it goes in the next few episodes."

Carissa Pavlica of TV Fanatic gave the 2-episode premiere a 4 star rating out of 5 and wrote, "If the first hour is all about luring you in with this chaotically charming, fog-kissed, "something's not quite right, but I'm into it anyway" seaside energy, the second hour basically grabs you by the shoulders and says, 'Are you sure you want to stay?'" Christine Kinori of The Review Geek wrote, "The perfect timing of the diegetic horror effects and immersive sound design helps to elevate the horror and make us invested as we try to figure out what is really out there in the fog. Is it even real?"

=== Awards and nominations ===
| Award | Category | Nominee | Result | Ref. |
|---|---|---|---|---|
| Primetime Emmy Awards | Outstanding Directing for a Comedy Series | Hiro Murai | Won | |
| Primetime Emmy Awards | Outstanding Writing for a Comedy Series | Katie Dippold | Won | |
| Primetime Creative Arts Emmy Awards | Outstanding Picture Editing for a Single-Camera Comedy Series | Kyle Reiter | Nominated | |
