= The Inaugural Swim =

- Widow's Bay episode
- Episode no.: Season 1 Episode 3
- Directed by: Hiro Murai
- Written by: Neil Casey
- Cinematography by: Christian Sprenger
- Editing by: Isaac Hagy
- Original release date: May 6, 2026
- Running time: 38 minutes

Guest appearances
- Elizabeth Alderfer as Marissa; K Callan as Ruth Livingston; Christian Clemenson as Dr. Calvin Morgan; Jeff Hiller as Dale; Toby Huss as Reverend Bryce; Nancy Lenehan as Gerrie Doyle

Episode chronology
← Previous "Lodging"	Next → "Beach Reads"

"The Inaugural Swim" is the third episode of the American comedy horror Widow's Bay. The episode was written by supervising producer Neil Casey, and directed by executive producer Hiro Murai. It was released on Apple TV in the United States on May 6, 2026.

The series is set in the fictional New England island town of Widow's Bay, which is afflicted by a centuries-old curse that brings various supernatural evils upon the island. Mayor Tom Loftis wants to make a good impression in order to raise awareness for tourism in town, while also trying to uncover the mysteries surrounding the area. In the episode, Tom welcomes new tourists to the town, but finds himself stalked by an entity known as the Sea Hag.

The episode received mostly positive reviews from critics, with praise towards the prosthetic make-up design used on the Sea Hag, performances and tonal balance. Matthew Rhys submitted the episode to support his Emmy nomination for Outstanding Lead Actor in a Comedy Series, which he won.

== Plot ==
Tourists arrive at Widow's Bay, to Tom's enjoyment. While driving, he decides to help a tourist named Marissa, who is staying for a bachelorette party. Smitten with her, they make plans for another meeting that night, but she never shows up. While driving, Tom encounters an old woman in the street. The woman rapidly runs to him and scratches his arm, forcing him to drive away. While discussing this with his co-worker Rosemary, Tom is told that the woman is the Sea Hag, and her scratch means she will follow him wherever he is.

As part of the summer season, Tom must perform the "Inaugural Swim" to prove the beach is safe for tourists. While Tom takes the swim, he notices the Sea Hag in the water. He quickly returns to the beach, where he sees she scratched his leg. Desperate, he consults with Wyck, who confirms the Sea Hag sees him as prey and will use the scratch to find and kill him. The legend says that she will paralyze the body of her victim and sit on their face until they die. Despite being warned that he should lock himself in a chest as protection, Tom goes on a date with Marissa at a restaurant, but declines her suggestion to go back to his house. Meanwhile, Reverend Bryce finds a well in the forest. Evan and his friends befriend a pair of girls visiting from Boston, who are shocked to learn Evan has never left the island; they suddenly see Bryce returning from the woods, and he warns them that evil resides on the island.

After Wyck warns that the Sea Hag wants him to invite her into his house, Tom is shocked that Marissa found his address, and refuses to let her inside, believing she is the Sea Hag. Upset, she leaves with her friends. However, Tom is later attacked by the Sea Hag after he becomes paralyzed like the legend foretold. He crawls away as he tries to hide in the bathroom inside the bathtub. The Sea Hag finds him and prepares to climb on top of Tom in the bathtub when Wyck shows up and kills the Sea Hag with a harpoon. During this, Bryce leaves a voicemail in Tom's phone, apologizing and claiming he found something. Elsewhere, Sheriff Bechir Clemmons puts out a request for backup at Patricia's ongoing "Sunset Cocktails" party, saying that chaos has ensued.

== Production ==
=== Development ===
The episode was written by supervising producer Neil Casey, and directed by executive producer Hiro Murai. It marked Casey's first writing credit, and Murai's third directing credit.

=== Writing ===
Series creator Katie Dippold said that she viewed the episode as "the end of Act One", as the series could not keep Tom from remaining skeptical for long. She said, "Something supernatural is happening. This place is cursed. He cannot fight that anymore. The complication is now the tourists are here, and now Tom has to contend with that. [Episode 3] just felt like the right time to get to it."

== Critical reviews ==
"The Inaugural Swim" earned mostly positive reviews from critics. Jen Chaney of Vulture gave the episode a 4 star rating out of 5 and wrote, "It's unclear whether this insularity is a byproduct of the curse or somehow a contributor to it. But it speaks to a deep, myopic sadness that lurks at the core of this town, where so much has been lost, and it seems more is about to be."

Sean T. Collins of Decider wrote, "The show's high concept, too, has been note-perfect from the start. This means that when you deviate from the expected course, the payoff is huge. The fact that if Tom had simply looked at his driveway he'd have seen that he just missed out on a legit chance to score with a very nice-seeming lady killed me, because like Tom, I fully thought she was the Sea Hag all along too! They caught me hook line and sinker." Bryce Olin of Show Snob wrote, "The episode is a roller coaster ride of misunderstandings, monsters, and horror as the small island community of Widow's Bay spirals into chaos."

Carissa Pavlica of TV Fanatic gave the episode a 4 star rating out of 5 and wrote, "I feel bad for Evan and his friends, too. It's embarrassing to be side-eyed when it's revealed you've never left the island. But when Reverend Bryce emerged looking stunned and talking evil, I thought, “You don't have that kind of fun in Boston, do you???”" Christine Kinori of The Review Geek wrote, "The closing scene with Bechir calling for help signals that there is more trouble coming. The church bells clearly signify that there are supernatural elements at play, and even the sheriff is at a loss for what to do. It also alludes to the town being haunted and implies that Tom is not the only one battling external, invisible forces that night. So what exactly is happening in Widow's Bay?"
