= Primetime Emmy Award for Outstanding Cinematography for a Series (Half-Hour) =

Television award category

Primetime Emmy Award for Cinematography for a Series (Half-Hour)
- Awarded for: Outstanding Cinematography for a Series (Half-Hour)
- Country: United States
- Presented by: Academy of Television Arts & Sciences
- Currently held by: Widow's Bay (2026)
- Website: emmys.com

The Primetime Emmy Award for Outstanding Cinematography for a Series (Half-Hour) is an annual award presented as part of the Primetime Emmy Awards. It was created as Outstanding Cinematography for a Half-Hour Series, incorporating single and multi-camera programs, in 2008 alongside Outstanding Cinematography for a One-Hour Series. From 2011 to 2016, the awards were combined as Outstanding Cinematography for a Single-Camera Series. The categories were divided again between 2017 and 2022. In 2023, the category was renamed Outstanding Cinematography for a Series (Half-Hour), combined with Outstanding Cinematography for a Multi-Camera Series. In 2024, they split again.

== Winners and nominations ==
=== 2000s ===
Year	Program	Episode	Nominees	Network
Outstanding Cinematography for a Half-Hour Series
2008	Californication	"Pilot"	Peter Levy	Showtime
2008	According to Jim	"The Chaperone"	George Mooradian	ABC
2008	In Treatment	"Week 6: Sophie"	Frank Murphy	HBO
2008	My Name Is Earl	"Stole a Motorcycle"	Michael Goi	NBC
2008	Scrubs	"My Princess"	John Inwood	NBC
2008	30 Rock	"Rosemary's Baby"	Vanja Cernjul	NBC
2009	Californication	"In Utero"	Michael Weaver	Showtime
2009	According to Jim	"Heaven Opposed to Hell"	George Mooradian	ABC
2009	Everybody Hates Chris	"Everybody Hates Back Talk"	Mark Doering-Powell	The CW
2009	30 Rock	"Apollo, Apollo"	Matthew Clark	NBC
2009	Weeds	"No Man Is Pudding"	Michael Trim	Showtime

=== 2010s ===
Year	Program	Episode	Nominees	Network
2010	Weeds	"A Modest Proposal"	Michael Trim	Showtime
2010	Gary Unmarried	"Gary Shoots Fish in a Barrel"	Gary Baum	CBS
2010	Hung	"Pilot"	Uta Briesewitz	HBO
2010	Nurse Jackie	"Apple Bong"	Vanja Cernjul	Showtime
2010	30 Rock	"Season 4"	Matthew Clark	NBC
2010	Two and a Half Men	"Crude and Uncalled For"	Steven V. Silver	CBS

Between 2011-2016, half-hour and one-hour series were both eligible for Outstanding Cinematography for a Single-Camera Series. No half-hour series were nominated during these years.

Year	Program	Episode	Nominees	Network
Outstanding Cinematography for a Single-Camera Series (Half-Hour)
2017
2017	Veep	"Qatar"	David Miller	HBO
2017	Ballers	"Game Day"	Rodney Taylor	HBO
2017	Divorce	"Pilot"	Reed Morano	HBO
2017	Mozart in the Jungle	"Now I Will Sing"	Tobias Datum	Amazon
2017	Silicon Valley	"Success Failure"	Tim Suhrstedt	HBO
2017	Transparent	"If I Were a Bell"	Jim Frohna	Amazon
2018
2018	Atlanta	"Teddy Perkins"	Christian Sprenger	FX
2018	Barry	"Chapter Eight: Know Your Truth"	Paula Huidobro	HBO
2018	The End of the F***ing World	"Episode 3"	Justin Brown	Netflix
2018	GLOW	"Pilot"	Christian Sprenger	Netflix
2018	Insecure	"Hella LA"	Patrick Cady	HBO
2018	Mozart in the Jungle	"Ichi Go Ichi E"	Tobias Datum	Prime Video
2019
2019	Russian Doll	"Ariadne"	Chris Teague	Netflix
2019	Ballers	"Rough Ride"	Anthony Hardwick	HBO
2019	Fleabag	"Episode 1"	Tony Miller	Prime Video
2019	Homecoming	"Optics"	Tod Campbell	Prime Video
2019	Insecure	"High-Like"	Ava Berkofsky	HBO
2019	What We Do in the Shadows	"Manhattan Night Club"	D.J. Stipsen	FX

=== 2020s ===
Year	Program	Episode	Nominees	Network
2020
2020	The Mandalorian	"Chapter 7: The Reckoning"	Greig Fraser and Baz Idoine	Disney+
2020	The End of the F***ing World	"Episode 2"	Benedict Spence	Netflix
2020	Homecoming	"Giant"	Jas Shelton	Prime Video
2020	Insecure	"Lowkey Happy"	Kira Kelly	HBO
2020	Insecure	"Lowkey Lost"	Ava Berkofsky	HBO
2021
2021	The Mandalorian	"Chapter 15: The Believer"	Matthew Jensen	Disney+
2021	Grown-ish	"Know Yourself"	Mark Doering-Powell	Freeform
2021	Hacks	"Primm"	Adam Bricker	HBO Max
2021	Made for Love	"User One"	Nathaniel Goodman	HBO Max
2021	Servant	"2:00"	Marshall Adams	Apple TV+
2022
2022	Atlanta	"Three Slaps"	Christian Sprenger	FX
2022	Barry	"starting now"	Carl Herse	HBO
2022	Grown-ish	"Put Your Hands Where My Eyes Could See"	Mark Doering-Powell	Freeform
2022	Hacks	"The Click"	Adam Bricker	HBO Max
2022	Insecure	"Reunited, Okay?!"	Ava Berkofsky	HBO
2022	Russian Doll	"Nowhen"	Ula Pontikos	Netflix
Outstanding Cinematography for a Series (Half-Hour)
2023
2023	Atlanta	"Andrew Wyeth. Alfred's World."	Christian Sprenger	FX
2023	Barry	"tricky legacies"	Carl Herse	HBO
2023	How I Met Your Father	"Daddy"	Gary Baum	Hulu
2023	The Mandalorian	"Chapter 20: The Foundling"	Dean Cundey	Disney+
2023	Only Murders in the Building	"I Know Who Did It"	Chris Teague	Hulu
2023	Schmigadoon!	"Something Real"	Jon Joffin	Apple TV+
Outstanding Cinematography for a Single-Camera Series (Half-Hour)
2024
2024	The Bear	"Forks"	Andrew Wehde	FX
2024	Hacks	"Just for Laughs"	Adam Bricker	Max
2024	Physical	"Like a Rocket"	Jimmy Lindsey	Apple TV+
2024	Reservation Dogs	"Deer Lady"	Mark Schwartzbard	FX
2024	Sugar	"Starry Eyed"	Richard Rutkowski	Apple TV+
Outstanding Cinematography for a Series (Half-Hour)
2025
2025	The Studio	"The Oner"	Adam Newport-Berra	Apple TV+
2025	Emily in Paris	"Masquerade"	Seamus Tierney	Netflix
2025	Georgie & Mandy's First Marriage	"The 6:10 to Lubbock"	Buzz Feitshans IV	CBS
2025	Hacks	"I Love L.A."	Adam Bricker	HBO Max
2025	The Righteous Gemstones	"Prelude"	Paul Daley	HBO
2026
2026	Widow's Bay	"Our History"	Christian Sprenger	Apple TV
2026	The Bear	"Scallop"	Andrew Wehde	FX
2026	Hacks	"The Garden"	Adam Bricker	HBO Max
2026	A Knight of the Seven Kingdoms	"In the Name of the Mother"	Gustav Danielsson	HBO
2026	The Upshaws	"Indy Streets"	Chuck Ozeas	Netflix

== Programs with multiple wins ==
5 wins

- Will & Grace

3 wins

- Atlanta
- How I Met Your Mother
- The Ranch
- Two and a Half Men

2 wins

- Californication
- The Mandalorian

== Programs with multiple nominations ==
Totals for Outstanding Cinematography for a Multi-Camera Series are combined, as this category was merged in 2023.

9 nominations

- Will & Grace

8 nominations

- Two and a Half Men

5 nominations

- Hacks
- How I Met Your Mother
- Insecure
- 2 Broke Girls

4 nominations

- According to Jim
- Everybody Loves Raymond
- The Mandalorian (Note: Total includes The Mandalorian’s nomination for Outstanding Cinematography for a Single-Camera Series (One Hour).)
- Mike & Molly
- The Ranch

3 nominations

- Atlanta
- Barry
- Frasier
- Friends
- 30 Rock

2 nominations

- Ballers
- The Bear
- The Big Bang Theory
- Californication
- The End of the F***ing World
- Everybody Hates Chris
- The Exes
- Grown-ish
- Homecoming
- How I Met Your Father
- Last Man Standing
- Mozart in the Jungle
- Pair of Kings
- Reba
- Rules of Engagement
- Russian Doll
- Spin City
- Superior Donuts
- Weeds

== Cinematographers with multiple wins ==
4 wins

- Christian Sprenger

== Cinematographers with multiple nominations ==
5 nominations

- Adam Bricker
- Christian Sprenger

4 nominations

- Mark Doering-Powell

3 nominations

- Ava Berkofsky

2 nominations

- Vanja Cernjul
- Matthew Clark
- Tobias Datum
- Michael Trim
- Andrew Wehde
