= Widow's Bay =

2026 American comedy horror television series

- Genre: Comedy horror; Supernatural horror; Mystery; Thriller
- Created by: Katie Dippold
- Showrunner: Katie Dippold
- Starring: Matthew Rhys; Kate O'Flynn; Kevin Carroll; Dale Dickey; Kingston Rumi Southwick; Stephen Root
- Music by: David Fleming
- Country of origin: United States
- Original language: English
- No. of seasons: 1
- No. of episodes: 10

Production
- Executive producers: Katie Dippold; Hiro Murai; Carver Karaszewski; Claudia Shin; Matthew Rhys
- Producers: Kaitlin Waldron; Christian Sprenger
- Cinematography: Christian Sprenger; Cody Jacobs
- Editors: Kyle Reiter; Jen Bryson; Isaac Hagy; Jing Han; Cameron Ross
- Running time: 31–48 minutes
- Production companies: Chum Films; Spooky Tree Productions; Apple Studios

Original release
- Network: Apple TV
- Release: April 29, 2026 – present

Widow's Bay is an American comedy horror television series created by Katie Dippold for Apple TV, and starring Matthew Rhys, Kate O'Flynn, Kevin Carroll, Dale Dickey, Kingston Rumi Southwick, and Stephen Root. The supernatural series is set in the fictional New England island town of Widow's Bay, which happens to be afflicted with a centuries-old curse that brings various supernatural evils upon the island. Dippold serves as showrunner and executive producer, while Hiro Murai serves as director and executive producer.

The series premiered on April 29, 2026, to critical acclaim. For its first season, it received a record 14 wins at the 78th Primetime Emmy Awards, including for Outstanding Comedy Series, acting wins for Rhys, O'Flynn, Root, and Betty Gilpin, as well as wins for directing and writing. In June 2026, the series was renewed for a second season.

== Cast and characters ==
=== Main ===
- Matthew Rhys as Tom Loftis, mayor of Widow's Bay. Originally from the mainland, he is initially skeptical of the local residents' superstitions about the island's supposed curse. He is a widower, and father to a son, Evan, from his marriage to his deceased wife, Lauren.
- Kate O'Flynn as Patricia Moyer, Tom's eccentric assistant. She is a social outcast among her former classmates, who believe she lied about being targeted by a serial killer known as the Boogeyman while in high school.
- Kevin Carroll as Bechir Clemmons, sheriff of Widow's Bay
- Dale Dickey as Rosemary, an employee in the mayor's office
- Kingston Rumi Southwick as Evan Loftis, Tom's rebellious teenage son, who was born on the island and is bored by a lack of things to do there.
- Stephen Root as Wyck Crawford, an outspoken believer of the town's supernatural history. He initially clashes with Tom over his refusal to believe in the island's curse.
- Jeff Hiller as Dale (season 2; recurring season 1), an employee of the mayor's office

=== Recurring ===
- K Callan as Ruth Livingston, Tom's elderly secretary
- Christian Clemenson as Dr. Calvin Morgan, the town doctor
- Nancy Lenehan as Gerrie Doyle, a resident who runs the island's historical society and is knowledgeable about its history and folklore
- Beck Nolan as PJ Glanville, one of Evan's friends
- Charles Van Flaherty as Gil, one of Evan's friends
- Neil Casey as Kurt, the innkeeper at the Breakwater Inn, a supposedly haunted inn
- Meredith Casey as Lauren Loftis, Tom's deceased wife
- Kylie McNeill as Kelly, a girl visiting from Boston who hits it off with Evan
- Sipiwe Moyo as Chelle, Bechir's wife

=== Guest ===
- Bashir Salahuddin as Arthur Lloyd, a journalist from The New York Times writing a piece on Widow's Bay
- William Hill as Wayne, the bartender at the Barnabus Tavern
- Tom Kemp as Shep Clark, a fisherman from Widow's Bay who goes missing out at sea
- Toby Huss as Reverend Bryce, the pastor of Widow's Bay
- Tim Baltz as William, a man Tom meets while staying at the Breakwater Inn
- Olli Haaskivi as Ray, a local coffee shop owner
- Elizabeth Alderfer as Marissa, a tourist who is serving as a bridesmaid and hits it off with Tom
- Lauren Bittner as Kris, Patricia's former high school classmate who socially excludes her
- Emily Davis as Shelby, a woman Patricia meets at her former classmates' party
- Connor Ratliff as Deputy Kent, Bechir's deputy
- Chris Fleming as Todd O'Connor, a local drug dealer known as "The Shaman" and Patricia's former classmate
- Michael Malvesti as Kenneth, the Town Hall custodian
- Hamish Linklater as Richard Warren, the founder of Widow's Bay
- Betty Gilpin as Sarah Westcott Warren, Richard's wife
- David Dean Bottrell as Pastor Collins, the pastor of Widow's Bay in 1702
- Veanne Cox as Abigail Stevens, the wife of Widow's Bay's physician in 1702
- Tom Nowicki as Ezra Lowery, a settler of Widow's Bay in 1702 whom Richard murders
- Lenora Severance as Frances Warren, Richard's youngest daughter
- Anthony Atamanuik as a guest at the Breakwater Inn who argues with Kurt
- Airon Armstrong as the Boogeyman, a masked killer who went on a murder spree in Widow's Bay decades ago

== Episodes ==
| No. | Title | Directed by | Written by | Original release date |
|---|---|---|---|---|
| 1 | "Welcome to Widow's Bay" | Hiro Murai | Katie Dippold | April 29, 2026 |
Mayor Tom Loftis of Widow's Bay, a sleepy island town off the coast of New England, is determined to bring tourism there by impressing a visiting reporter from The New York Times. Many residents believe the island is cursed due to the many tragedies in its history, but Tom is skeptical. Tom clashes with Wyck, a local who insists that the arrival of a thick fog means the island is "waking up" and that Tom needs to shut everything down. A fisherman named Shep Clark goes missing at sea; after he is found, his eyes go white and he attacks Tom in the hospital before dying. Tom becomes paranoid and unsuccessfully warns locals not to go outside at night due to the fog. Deep underground, a basement is seen containing a chair with restraints and a large cellar door.
| 2 | "Lodging" | Hiro Murai | Kelly Galuska | April 29, 2026 |
Widow's Bay prepares for tourists after the New York Times article promoting the town is published. The church bell rings nine times in the middle of the night despite being chained up, prompting Reverend Bryce to consult an old warning of what to do if this happens. Residents dare Tom into staying overnight at the supposedly haunted Breakwater Inn; he agrees to stay there and document its oddities on camera. That night, he befriends a man named William, who later appears to Tom in a nightmare as a killer clown who attacks him inside a crawl space. The next morning, security footage shows Tom talking to himself during his supposed interaction with William. Tom, Wyck, and innkeeper Kurt discover black mold in the suite after Kurt briefly enters the room and emerges believing he had been trapped inside far longer than he actually was. Despite Wyck's insistence that the island's curse is real, Tom refuses to close the town.
| 3 | "The Inaugural Swim" | Hiro Murai | Neil Casey | May 6, 2026 |
As tourists fill Widow's Bay, Tom has a flirtation with a woman named Marissa, who is in town for a bachelorette party. At night, Tom encounters an entity known as the Sea Hag, who scratches him on the arm; Wyck tells Tom that the Sea Hag scratches men to mark them as prey so she can track them down to kill them. After a date with Marissa, Tom fears that she is the Sea Hag and sends her away, but the real Sea Hag enters his house and is stopped when Wyck arrives and shoots her. Meanwhile, Bryce finds a mysterious well in the woods. Tom's son Evan and his friends befriend a pair of girls visiting from Boston, who are shocked to learn Evan has never left the island; they suddenly see Bryce returning from the woods, and he warns them that evil resides on the island. Elsewhere, Sheriff Bechir Clemmons puts out a request for backup at Patricia's ongoing "Sunset Cocktails" party, saying that chaos has ensued.
| 4 | "Beach Reads" | Sam Donovan | Mackenzie Dohr | May 13, 2026 |
Four days prior to the Sunset Cocktails party, Patricia discovers a self-help book in her mobile library's donation bin, which encourages her to plan the perfect party to prove her social worth. A failed attempt to socialize with women from her high school reveals that Patricia believes she was stalked by a serial killer known as the Boogeyman, who murdered two other teen girls, but that her story is widely disbelieved in town. The Sunset Cocktails party starts poorly with low attendance, but as more tourists trickle in, Patricia serves punch and quickly becomes the center of attention. Bechir arrives and breaks Patricia out of a trance, making her realize she has been under an illusion, that her self-help book is in fact a grimoire, and that she served her guests punch made with animal parts. Down at the beach, the entranced partygoers walk open-mouthed into the sea, but Patricia breaks the spell by throwing the grimoire into a bonfire. Walking home, she is picked up by Tom and Wyck, and the three drive to the church to discover that Reverend Bryce has hanged himself.
| 5 | "What to Expect on Your Trip" | Andrew DeYoung | Colton Dunn | May 20, 2026 |
Tom enforces a townwide curfew following Bryce's death, angering residents eager to attend fireworks celebrations. Investigating Bryce's burned rectory with Patricia and Wyck, Tom discovers a charred page of writing, psychedelic mushrooms, and a phone number Bryce repeatedly called before his death. The number leads them to Todd O'Connor, a self-styled shaman who explains that the mushrooms induce terrifying visions linked to the island's mysteries. Hoping to uncover the truth, Wyck buys a tincture containing the fungus, but Todd mistakenly drugs Tom instead, causing him to hallucinate for the next 12 hours. Meanwhile, Wyck learns from the restored piece of writing that the island's curse may be tied to a cylindrical pendant buried with Widow's Bay founder Richard Warren. Elsewhere, Evan and his friends visit the house said to belong to the Boogeyman, but Bechir stops Evan from entering. Still hallucinating later that night, Tom flashes back to the day Evan was born, when his wife Lauren suddenly lost her eyesight while leaving the island, and—contrary to what he later told his son—survived childbirth in a catatonic state.
| 6 | "Our History" | Ti West | Alberto Roldán | May 27, 2026 |
In 1702, Sarah Westcott arrives in Widow's Bay to marry founder Richard Warren, discovering that the island is plagued by strange illnesses, disappearances, and fear surrounding Richard himself. After witnessing Richard murder a local man accusing him of consorting with the devil, Sarah learns from the town pastor that Richard is believed to have killed before, including his first wife. That night, an attempted assassination reveals Richard cannot be killed by ordinary means. Sarah discovers tunnels beneath their home and finds the room containing the chair and cellar door. The pastor and several townsfolk recruit Sarah into a plan to poison Richard and flee the island with his children. Richard discovers the plot, but Sarah escapes with the children while the townsfolk capture him. Before being buried alive, Richard reveals that he made a pact (via hallucinogenic mushrooms) with the demonic entity controlling the island to protect the colony during its first winter, warning that sacrifices are necessary to prevent the island's terrors from returning. In the present, Wyck digs up Richard Warren's grave.
| 7 | "Seasickness" | Sam Donovan | Dave Harris | May 27, 2026 |
After waking from his mushroom trip, Tom learns that Wyck has exhumed Richard Warren, who survived being buried alive due to the island's covenant. Warren explains to Tom the pact he made with the island's entity via the mushrooms, having stored a signed copy of the agreement inside the cylindrical pendant he wears. Believing the curse will end with his death but unable to die within the island's boundaries, Warren convinces Tom and Wyck to transport him by boat into the deep waters beyond the island, where he hopes he will rapidly age and die. During the journey, Wyck recounts how he accidentally caused the death of his childhood friend during a similar trip years earlier. As the waters become increasingly violent, Warren changes his mind about dying and attacks Tom and Wyck, but they force him back into his coffin. After crossing the boundary, Tom discovers Warren has finally died, leading him and Wyck to believe the curse has ended. Meanwhile, Evan searches Tom's lockbox with one of the girls from Boston and discovers photographs revealing that his mother survived long after his birth.
| 8 | "Your Baggage" | Andrew DeYoung | Emma Ketchum | June 3, 2026 |
Believing the curse has lifted, Tom plans to take Evan off the island to attend a Boston Red Sox game. When Tom returns home, Evan confronts him with the photos of his mother; Tom explains that she suffered a stroke during childbirth that left her mentally unstable and confined to an asylum on the island, where she later died of an aneurysm. Meanwhile, the Boogeyman returns and chases Patricia through her neighborhood. While seeking help from her former classmates, Patricia admits she falsely claimed to receive threatening calls during the original killings as a teenager but insists the rest of her story was true. Pursued across town, Patricia reaches a gas station (where Bechir is shopping) and uses a taser to ignite a stream of gasoline and set the Boogeyman on fire, but he survives long enough to assault the station attendant and wound Bechir before Patricia fatally shoots him with a shotgun, though she remains suspicious of his ability to resurrect until witnessing his cremation firsthand. Afterwards, Patricia learns that Bechir's wife Chelle is pregnant and warns him that if their child is born on the island, the child will never be able to leave. As a storm approaches, Wyck visits Tom to warn him that the curse is not yet over.
| 9 | "Emergency Shelter" | Hiro Murai | Bobak Esfarjani | June 10, 2026 |
In 1702, Sarah Warren attempts to flee Widow's Bay with Richard's children on a rowboat, but they are engulfed in fog; Frances, the youngest child, falls overboard while the other children begin bleeding from their eyes and mouths. In the present, a violent storm approaches Widow's Bay; Patricia urges Tom to activate the town's emergency shelters after communication with the mainland is lost. While reviewing Sarah's journal, Patricia realizes that Frances survived and started a family, meaning Richard Warren's bloodline continued on the island for generations. Tom orders residents and tourists into the shelters, while Bechir unsuccessfully attempts to get Chelle off the island before the storm worsens. While retrieving equipment needed to restore power to the shelters, Tom witnesses the Shaman being swept into the storm and carried into the sky. At the shelter, Tom's co-worker Rosemary traces the Warren lineage and reveals that Ruth, Tom's elderly assistant, is the last surviving member of the bloodline. Convinced Ruth's death could end the curse, Tom leaves the shelter to kill her.
| 10 | "We Hope You Enjoyed Your Time!" | Hiro Murai | Katie Dippold | June 17, 2026 |
Tom finds an oblivious Ruth going about her day at home. The two discuss their lives and the hardships of growing up on the island; Tom secretly poisons Ruth's tea with a deadly combination of her prescription medications. At the shelter, mayor's office employee Dale uncovers evidence that the town has secretly maintained Warren's covenant for generations by sacrificing people to the island whenever the church bell rings. Bechir learns that Chelle is going into labor. As Ruth succumbs to an apparent overdose, she reveals that she is the biological mother of Tom's late wife Lauren, making Evan—not Ruth—the last surviving descendant of Richard Warren. Realizing the curse will not end with Ruth's death, Tom rushes to save her, but Bechir arrives and shoots her after learning of the plan from Patricia. Meanwhile, Evan and his friends discover tunnels beneath the shelter leading to the sacrificial chamber. Kenny, the custodian at the mayor's office, finds them, but Evan's friends lock the custodian inside the chamber as a prank, and he gets dragged through the cellar doors and sacrificed to the entity beneath the island, fulfilling the covenant and causing the storm to subside. The following day as the island recovers, the church bell rings eight times, signaling that eight more sacrifices are required.

== Production ==
=== Development ===
The series was created by Katie Dippold, who is an executive producer and showrunner. It was ordered by Apple TV in September 2024, with Hiro Murai directing and executive-producing, alongside Claudia Shin and Carver Karaszewski. In February 2025, Matthew Rhys joined the project as an executive producer; he leads the cast as Mayor Tom Loftis. Murai directed five episodes of the first season; Ti West, Sam Donovan, and Andrew DeYoung served as directors of the remaining episodes. Alongside Rhys, the cast includes Kate O'Flynn, Stephen Root, Kingston Rumi Southwick, Kevin Carroll, and Dale Dickey.

On June 11, 2026, Apple TV renewed the series for a second season. In August 2026, Jeff Hiller was promoted to a series regular for the second season.

=== Filming ===
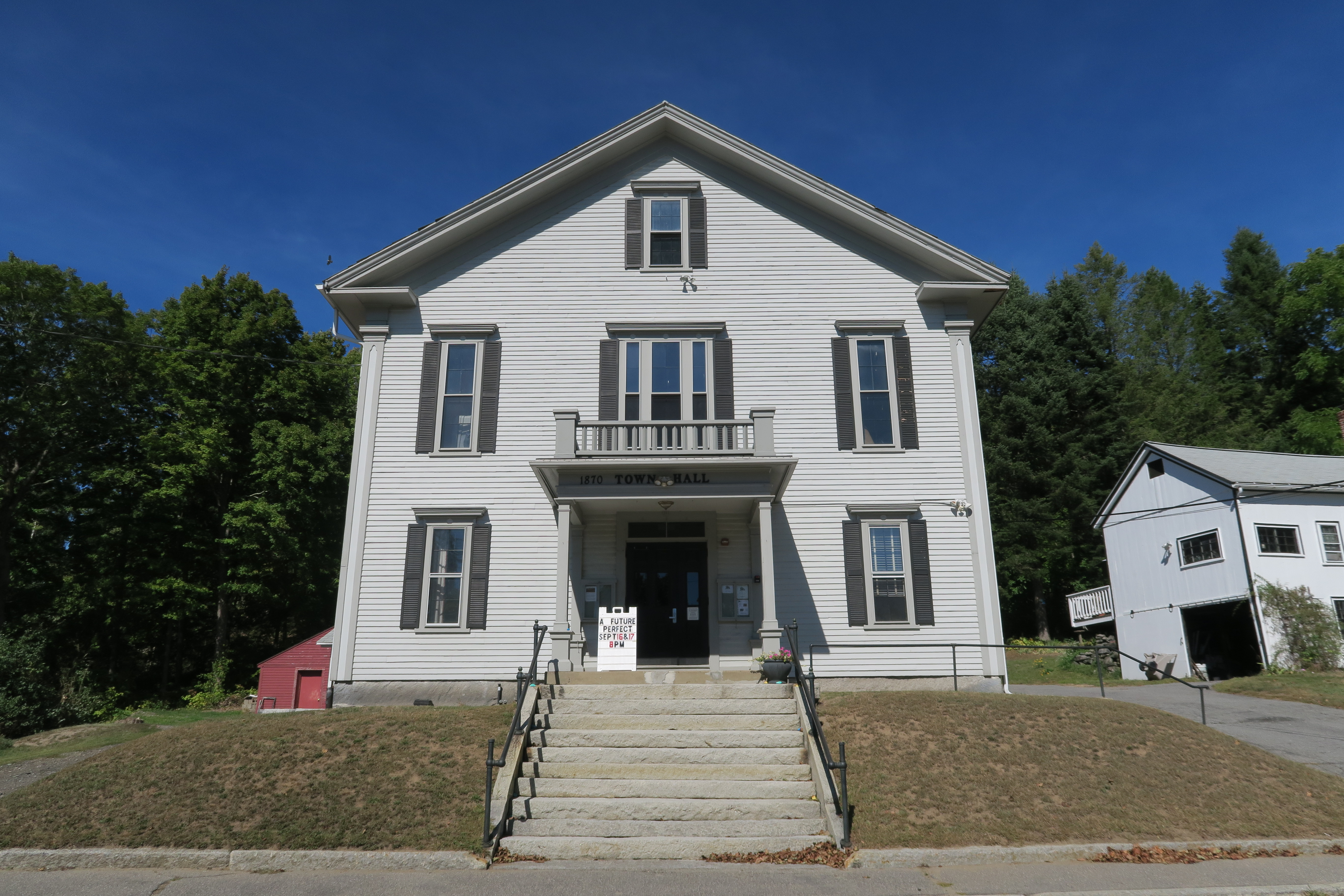
Berlin Town Hall, one of the filming locations

Filming took place in Massachusetts in 2025, with locations including Ayer and Worcester in May, and Essex, Gloucester and Rockport in June. Interiors were constructed and shot at New England Studios in Devens. The Berlin Town Hall stood in for the town hall of Widow's Bay while Eastern Point Light was used as the town's lighthouse. The Rebecca Nurse Homestead in Danvers, the Martha Mary Chapel in Sudbury, and the Lorenzo Maynard House in Maynard were also used as filming locations. Christian Sprenger served as cinematographer for six of the ten episodes of Widow's Bay's first season while Cody Jacobs shot the remaining four episodes. Visually, Sprenger wanted to "reference this feeling of nostalgia of cinema past" as nothing about the town of Widow's Bay is modern, citing Jaws and The Shining as references used. He shot the series using the Arri Alexa 35 large format digital camera.

=== Music ===
After having filmed the first two episodes, Dippold contacted David Fleming to score Widow's Bay. Neither of the two wanted to use comedy music, with Fleming suggesting to use elements from the fictional town to create the soundscape. This included the use of bass flutes and other woodwinds, as well as conches. For the sixth episode, set in 1702, instruments such as the Baroque cello and viola da gamba were used. For the eighth episode, inspiration was drawn from John Carpenter's film score to the 1978 film Halloween and its use of the analog synthesizer. The score was recorded in Los Angeles, and the soundtrack album was released on May 4, 2026, via Milan Records.

== Release ==
The first two episodes were released on Apple TV on April 29, 2026, with further episodes being made available weekly.

== Reception ==
=== Critical response ===
On the review aggregator website Rotten Tomatoes, the first season holds an approval rating of 98%, based on 108 reviews, with an average rating of 8.5/10. The website's critics consensus states: "Katie Dippold successfully continues to invest in eccentricity with this outlandish horror-comedy that stokes the genre's well-worn tropes to winning effect, bringing scares, laughs, and a game cast." Metacritic, which uses a weighted average, assigned a score of 78 out of 100, based on 26 critics, indicating "generally favorable" reviews.

Lucy Mangan of The Guardian gave the series 5 out of 5 stars, calling it "an absolute blast [...] rich and wonderful. Grownup, funny, scary, true—Mare of Easttown meets Schitt's Creek, but with something else that makes it singular". Variety's Alison Herman wrote, "Widow's Bay may not make the best tourist destination, but I'd happily make a return trip."

=== Awards and nominations ===
| Year | Award | Category | Recipient(s) | Result | Ref. |
|---|---|---|---|---|---|
| 2026 | Critics' Choice Super Awards | Best Horror Series, Limited Series or Made-for-TV Movie | Widow's Bay | Won | |
| 2026 | Critics' Choice Super Awards | Best Actor in a Horror Series, Limited Series or Made-for-TV Movie | Matthew Rhys | Won | |
| 2026 | Critics' Choice Super Awards | Best Actress in a Horror Series, Limited Series or Made-for-TV Movie | Kate O'Flynn | Won | |
| 2026 | Dorian TV Awards | Best TV Comedy | Widow's Bay | Nominated | |
| 2026 | Dorian TV Awards | Best Genre TV Show | Widow's Bay | Won | |
| 2026 | Dorian TV Awards | Best TV Performance – Comedy | Matthew Rhys | Nominated | |
| 2026 | Dorian TV Awards | Best Supporting TV Performance – Comedy | Kate O'Flynn | Won | |
| 2026 | Fangoria Chainsaw Awards | Best Series | Widow's Bay | Won | |
| 2026 | IndieWire Honors | Visionary Award | Katie Dippold and Hiro Murai | Honored | |
| 2026 | Hollywood Music in Media Awards | Best Original Score – TV Show/Limited Series (Foreign Language) | David Fleming | Won | |
| 2026 | Hollywood Music in Media Awards | Best Music Supervision – Television | Toko Nagata | Nominated | |
| 2026 | MacGuffin Awards | Half-Hour Single Camera Television Series | Morgan Kling | Won | |
| 2026 | Primetime Emmy Awards | Outstanding Comedy Series | Katie Dippold, Hiro Murai, Carver Karaszewski, Claudia Shin, Matthew Rhys, Joanne Toll, Kelly Galuska, Mackenzie Dohr, Neil Casey, Colton Dunn, Kaitlin Waldron, and Christian Sprenger | Won | |
| 2026 | Primetime Emmy Awards | Outstanding Lead Actor in a Comedy Series | Matthew Rhys | Won | |
| 2026 | Primetime Emmy Awards | Outstanding Supporting Actor in a Comedy Series | Stephen Root | Won | |
| 2026 | Primetime Emmy Awards | Outstanding Supporting Actress in a Comedy Series | Dale Dickey | Nominated | |
| 2026 | Primetime Emmy Awards | Outstanding Supporting Actress in a Comedy Series | Kate O'Flynn | Won | |
| 2026 | Primetime Emmy Awards | Outstanding Directing for a Comedy Series | Hiro Murai (for "Welcome to Widow's Bay") | Won | |
| 2026 | Primetime Emmy Awards | Outstanding Writing for a Comedy Series | Katie Dippold (for "Welcome to Widow's Bay") | Won | |
| 2026 | Primetime Creative Arts Emmy Awards | Outstanding Guest Actor in a Comedy Series | Hamish Linklater (for "Seasickness") | Nominated | |
| 2026 | Primetime Creative Arts Emmy Awards | Outstanding Guest Actress in a Comedy Series | Betty Gilpin (for "Our History") | Won | |
| 2026 | Primetime Creative Arts Emmy Awards | Outstanding Casting for a Comedy Series | Allison Jones, Emily Buntyn, Lisa Lobel, and Angela Peri | Won | |
| 2026 | Primetime Creative Arts Emmy Awards | Outstanding Cinematography for a Series (Half-Hour) | Christian Sprenger (for "Our History") | Won | |
| 2026 | Primetime Creative Arts Emmy Awards | Outstanding Music Composition for a Series (Original Dramatic Score) | David Fleming (for "Our History") | Won | |
| 2026 | Primetime Creative Arts Emmy Awards | Outstanding Music Supervision | Toko Nagata (for "Beach Reads") | Won | |
| 2026 | Primetime Creative Arts Emmy Awards | Outstanding Picture Editing for a Single-Camera Comedy Series | Jen Bryson (for "What to Expect on Your Trip") | Nominated | |
| 2026 | Primetime Creative Arts Emmy Awards | Outstanding Picture Editing for a Single-Camera Comedy Series | Isaac Hagy (for "Our History") | Nominated | |
| 2026 | Primetime Creative Arts Emmy Awards | Outstanding Picture Editing for a Single-Camera Comedy Series | Kyle Reiter (for "Welcome to Widow's Bay") | Nominated | |
| 2026 | Primetime Creative Arts Emmy Awards | Outstanding Production Design for a Narrative Program (Half-Hour) | Steve Arnold, Peter Borck, and Jennifer Engel (for "Lodging") | Won | |
| 2026 | Primetime Creative Arts Emmy Awards | Outstanding Sound Editing for a Comedy or Drama Series (Half-Hour) and Animation | Matt Yocum, Sang Kim, Goeun Everett, Ryan Sullivan, Nate Underkuffler, Leslie Bloome, and Shaun Brennan (for "What to Expect on Your Trip") | Won | |
| 2026 | Primetime Creative Arts Emmy Awards | Outstanding Sound Mixing for a Comedy or Drama Series (Half-Hour) and Animation | Tim Hoogenakker, Larry Benjamin, Kevin Parker, Scott Michael Smith, Judah Getz, and Leslie Bloome (for "What to Expect on Your Trip") | Won | |
| 2026 | Set Decorators Society of America TV Awards | Best Achievement in Décor/Design of a One Hour Contemporary Series | Jennifer Engel and Steve Arnold | Won | |
| 2026 | Television Critics Association Awards | Program of the Year | Widow's Bay | Nominated | |
| 2026 | Television Critics Association Awards | Outstanding Achievement in Comedy | Widow's Bay | Won | |
| 2026 | Television Critics Association Awards | Outstanding New Program | Widow's Bay | Won | |
| 2026 | Television Critics Association Awards | Individual Achievement in Comedy | Kate O'Flynn | Won | |
| 2026 | Television Critics Association Awards | Individual Achievement in Comedy | Matthew Rhys | Nominated | |
| 2026 | World Soundtrack Awards | Television Composer of the Year | David Fleming | Nominated | |
| 2027 | Grammy Awards | Best Score Soundtrack for Visual Media | David Fleming | Pending | |
