= What to Expect on Your Trip =

- Widow's Bay episode
- Episode no.: Season 1 Episode 5
- Directed by: Andrew DeYoung
- Written by: Colton Dunn
- Cinematography by: Cody Jacobs
- Editing by: Jen Bryson
- Original release date: May 20, 2026
- Running time: 37 minutes

Guest appearances
- K Callan as Ruth Livingston; Neil Casey as Kurt; Chris Fleming as Todd O'Connor; Olli Haaskivi as Ray; William Hill as Wayne; Jeff Hiller as Dale; Nancy Lenehan as Gerrie Doyle; Hamish Linklater as Richard Warren

Episode chronology
| ← Previous "Beach Reads" | Next → "Our History" |

"What to Expect on Your Trip" is the fifth episode of the American comedy horror Widow's Bay. The episode was written by supervising producer Colton Dunn, and directed by Andrew DeYoung. It was released on Apple TV in the United States on May 20, 2026.

The series is set in the fictional New England island town of Widow's Bay, which is afflicted by a centuries-old curse that brings various supernatural evils upon the island. Mayor Tom Loftis wants to make a good impression in order to raise awareness for tourism in town, while also trying to uncover the mysteries surrounding the area. In the episode, Tom, Wyck and Patricia try to find more information about Reverend Bryce's death, with Tom experiencing a drug trip in the process.

The episode earned highly positive reviews from critics, with particular praise for Matthew Rhys' performance.

== Plot ==
The morning after finding Reverend Bryce's body, Tom enforces a curfew, affecting the planned fireworks for that night. Investigating Bryce's burned rectory with Patricia and Wyck, Tom discovers a charred page of writing, psychedelic mushrooms, and a phone number Bryce repeatedly called before his death.

They visit Todd O'Connor, a self-styled shaman who explains that the mushrooms induce terrifying visions linked to the island's mysteries. Intrigued, Wyck buys some mushrooms, despite Tom's reservations. However, Tom accidentally drinks from a cup containing the mushrooms, as Todd mistook him for Wyck, and he will now experience severe effects over the next 12 hours. Tom begins experiencing some time jumps through the day, as he struggles to stay focused and continues asking for Evan. During this, Wyck learns from the restored piece of writing that the island's curse may be tied to a cylindrical pendant buried with Widow's Bay founder Richard Warren.

At night, Evan and his friends visit the house said to belong to the Boogeyman, but Bechir stops Evan from entering. Evan is forced to return home, where he gets into an argument with Tom over their relationship, while also questioning why they never leave the island. Locking himself in his room, Tom flashes back to the day Evan was born, when his wife Lauren suddenly lost her eyesight while leaving the island. However, while Tom claimed she died during the birth, it is revealed that she actually survived, albeit now in a catatonic state. Back in the present, Tom prays for Evan, when he starts hearing a strange voice.

== Production ==
=== Development ===
The episode was written by supervising producer Colton Dunn, and directed by Andrew DeYoung. It marked Dunn's first writing credit, and DeYoung's first directing credit.

=== Filming ===
For the scenes where Tom experiences the drug effects, Matthew Rhys checked YouTube videos to check "which faces to pull." He added, "It's hard. But thankfully we had these incredible directors that you could give yourself over to with such trust, and they would say, ‘No. Let's pull it in a bit. Or let's push it out a bit.’ And they were our barometers."

== Critical reviews ==
"What to Expect on Your Trip" earned extremely positive reviews from critics. Jen Chaney of Vulture gave the episode a 4 star rating out of 5, praising the performances by Rhys and Kingston Rumi Southwick and writing, "Things are, repeatedly, not what they seem, a theme milked very effectively for comedy but that also speaks more broadly to some truths about the island".

Cheryl Eddy of Gizmodo wrote, "The Apple TV show, one of the brightest surprises on streaming right now, hit yet another new high with 'What to Expect on Your Trip.'"

Sean T. Collins of Decider wrote, "I've learned by now not to try to predict Widow's Bay, which I never would have predicted to be one of the best shows of the year." Bryce Olin of Show Snob wrote, "Widow's Bay heads into episode 5, 'What to Expect on Your Trip,' after two outstanding episodes. ... Well, it appears Widow's Bay leveled up again in episode 5."

Carissa Pavlica of TV Fanatic gave the episode a 4.5 star rating out of 5 and wrote, "Sometimes, you're so wasted that people don't even bother considering what you're saying has any merit. Although, in this case, they probably should believe whatever Tom says, wasted or not." Christine Kinori of The Review Geek gave the episode a 4 star rating out of 5 and wrote, "On a technical front, the amazing camera work used in this episode is what brings the whole hallucinogenic experience together. The director uses the chaotic handheld camera style to make the audience feel as disoriented as Tom. From the close-up to the vertigo effect and the subjective audio-visual distortion, everything is on point."

=== Accolades ===
TVLine named Matthew Rhys as a honorable mention for the "Performer of the Week" for the week of May 23, 2026, for his performance in the episode. The site wrote, "As Tom's trip got more intense, Rhys left the heavy lifting to his eyes, communicating Tom's terror and confusion with little more than silent stares. And when the psychedelic experience reached its peak, forcing Tom to confront his late wife's eerie demise, Rhys' performance turned subtler but no less affecting. Tom's clearly got a demon or two left to exorcise, and Rhys has us seated for every haunting moment."
