= Presumed Innocent (TV series) =

American anthology TV series (2024–present)

- Promotional poster
- Genre: Legal thriller Anthology
- Created by: David E. Kelley
- Based on: Presumed Innocent by Scott Turow (season 1)
- Showrunner: David E. Kelley
- Starring: Jake Gyllenhaal; Ruth Negga; Bill Camp; O-T Fagbenle; Chase Infiniti; Nana Mensah; Renate Reinsve; Peter Sarsgaard; Kingston Rumi Southwick; Elizabeth Marvel
- Music by: Danny Bensi; Saunder Jurriaans
- Country of origin: United States
- Original language: English
- No. of seasons: 1
- No. of episodes: 8

Production
- Executive producers: David E. Kelley; J. J. Abrams; Rachel Rusch Rich; Jake Gyllenhaal; Dustin Thomason; Matthew Tinker; Sharr White; Anne Sewitsky; Greg Yaitanes
- Producers: Caroline James; Trevor Baker; Andrew Balek
- Cinematography: Daniel Voldheim; Doug Emmett
- Editors: Trevor Baker; Eleanor Infante; Philip Neel; Ryan Jones; Tyler Eversmann; Amy Pellouchoud; Rafa Garcia; Emilio Luc Castillo
- Running time: 42–50 minutes
- Production companies: Bad Robot; David E. Kelley Productions; Old Curiosity Shop Productions; Nine Stories Productions; Warner Bros. Television Studios

Original release
- Network: Apple TV+
- Release: June 12 – July 24, 2024
- Network: Apple TV

Presumed Innocent is an American legal thriller anthology television series created by David E. Kelley. Jake Gyllenhaal starred in the first season, which is based on the 1987 novel of the same name by Scott Turow. The book was previously adapted into the 1990 film starring Harrison Ford and Brian Dennehy. The first season premiered on Apple TV+ on June 12, 2024. In July 2024, it was renewed for a second season, which is based on Dissection of a Murder by Jo Murray. The second season is scheduled to premiere on February 19, 2027.

The first season received four acting nominations at the 77th Primetime Emmy Awards for Jake Gyllenhaal, Ruth Negga, Bill Camp and Peter Sarsgaard.

== Premise ==
The first season follows a prosecutor, who became the prime suspect in the murder of his colleague with whom he was having an affair.

The second season is about a defense attorney, who faces off against her district attorney husband in a murder case that threatens their career and marriage.

== Cast ==
=== Season 1 ===
==== Main ====
- Jake Gyllenhaal as Rusty Sabich, a prosecutor accused of murder
- Ruth Negga as Barbara Sabich, Rusty's wife
- Bill Camp as Raymond Horgan, a veteran attorney
- O-T Fagbenle as Nico Della Guardia
- Chase Infiniti as Jaden Sabich, Rusty's daughter
- Nana Mensah as Det. Alana Rodriguez
- Renate Reinsve as Carolyn Polhemus, a woman with whom Rusty was having an affair
- Peter Sarsgaard as Tommy Molto, Rusty's rival who is prosecutor on the case
- Kingston Rumi Southwick as Kyle Sabich, Rusty's son
- Elizabeth Marvel as Lorraine Horgan, Raymond's wife

==== Recurring ====
- Lily Rabe as Dr. Liz Rush
- James Hiroyuki Liao as Herbert Kumagai
- Virginia Kull as Eugenia
- Matthew Alan as Dalton Caldwell
- Tate Birchmore as Michael Caldwell
- Noma Dumezweni as Judge Lyttle
- Gabby Beans as Mya

==== Guest ====
- Mark Harelik as Liam Reynolds
- Rosanna Arquette as Kate
- Sarunas J. Jackson as Clifton
- Marco Rodríguez as Brian Ratzer
- Mary Lynn Rajskub as Pathologist

=== Season 2 ===
==== Main ====
- Rachel Brosnahan as Leila Reynolds
- Jack Reynor
- Matthew Rhys
- Fiona Shaw
- Courtney B. Vance
- Lesley-Ann Brandt

==== Recurring ====
- John Magaro
- Michael Hsu Rosen
- Ji-young Yoo
- Judith Light

== Episodes ==
Season	Episodes	Originally released		
Season	Episodes	First released	Last released	Network
1	8	June 12, 2024	July 24, 2024	Apple TV+
2	8	February 19, 2027	April 2, 2027	Apple TV

=== Season 1 (2024) ===
No. overall	No. in season	Title	Directed by	Teleplay by	Original release date	Prod. code
1	1	"Bases Loaded"	Anne Sewitsky	David E. Kelley	June 12, 2024	T13.23851
Chief deputy prosecutor Rusty Sabich is assigned to investigate the shocking murder of his colleague, Carolyn Polhemus. As details of the crime scene emerge, Rusty works to project confidence and control within the office, despite the personal and professional implications of the case. His previous affair with Carolyn complicates matters, and he conceals that while attempting to steer the investigation. Tensions rise among the prosecution team as questions surface about motive and access. At home, Rusty struggles to maintain normalcy with his wife Barbara and their children while privately grappling with grief and anxiety. By the episode’s end, he is being interviewed by the new Chief deputy, who tells him Carolyn had been pregnant when she died.
2	2	"People vs. Rozat Sabich"	Anne Sewitsky	David E. Kelley	June 12, 2024	T13.23852
As suspicion shifts toward Rusty, prosecutor Tommy Molto methodically builds a case against him, reframing the investigation into a potential prosecution. Evidence and testimony begin aligning in ways that cast doubt on Rusty’s claims of innocence. DNA testing confirms Rusty's paternity. Meanwhile, veteran attorney Raymond Horgan steps forward to defend Rusty, assembling a legal strategy designed to counter the mounting allegations. The professional rivalry between Tommy and Raymond intensifies, spilling into the courtroom and the media. At home, the Sabich family reels from the public fallout, facing scrutiny from neighbors and the press. The episode charts Rusty’s transition from investigator to accused, as the legal system he once served turns its focus squarely on him.
3	3	"Discovery"	Greg Yaitanes	Miki Johnson and David E. Kelley	June 19, 2024	T13.23853
During the discovery phase, Rusty learns that prosecutors possess damaging evidence that could significantly undermine his defense. Forensic findings and digital records raise troubling questions about his movements and his relationship with Carolyn. Raymond works to assess the strength of the state’s case while preparing counterarguments. Outside the courtroom, Barbara takes steps to safeguard herself and her children, confronting the possibility that more secrets about Rusty may surface. The strain on their marriage becomes more visible as trust erodes. As both sides prepare for trial, the episode underscores how legal strategy and personal betrayal intertwine, leaving Rusty increasingly isolated.
4	4	"The Burden"	Greg Yaitanes	Sharr White & David E. Kelley	June 26, 2024	T13.23854
Attention turns to Rusty’s son Kyle after questions arise about his whereabouts on the night of Carolyn’s murder. Investigators probe inconsistencies, adding emotional weight to an already fragile family dynamic. Tommy Molto interviews Carolyn’s teenage son, hoping his testimony will clarify unresolved aspects of the case, but the conversation introduces new complications. Raymond and Rusty must weigh whether to address Kyle’s situation publicly or shield him from further scrutiny. As revelations ripple through both families, the case grows more tangled, blurring lines between suspicion and coincidence. The episode explores the burden carried by those closest to the accused as the legal battle deepens.
5	5	"Pregame"	Greg Yaitanes	David E. Kelley & Sharr White & Miki Johnson	July 3, 2024	T13.23855
On the eve of trial, Raymond publicly maintains Rusty’s innocence, projecting confidence in their defense strategy. Privately, however, the looming proceedings intensify pressure on the Sabich family. Media attention escalates, and courtroom preparations expose weaknesses on both sides. Barbara confronts the emotional toll of standing by her husband, while Rusty wrestles with doubt and anger over the accusations against him. Strategic disagreements arise within the defense team regarding how aggressively to challenge the prosecution’s narrative. As opening statements approach, the episode captures the psychological strain of waiting for judgment, with the family’s unity tested as never before.
6	6	"The Elements"	Greg Yaitanes	Sharr White & Miki Johnson	July 10, 2024	T13.23856
The trial begins, and both sides lay out competing versions of Carolyn’s death. Prosecutors present forensic and circumstantial evidence intended to establish motive and opportunity, while the defense challenges the credibility and interpretation of key findings. Tensions flare inside the courtroom as witnesses deliver testimony that shifts the atmosphere dramatically. Unexpected developments threaten to disrupt the proceedings, forcing the judge to intervene and attorneys to adapt in real time. Outside the courthouse, public opinion grows increasingly divided. The episode emphasizes how fragile courtroom momentum can be, with each revelation altering the balance between conviction and reasonable doubt.
7	7	"The Witness"	Greg Yaitanes	Sharr White & Miki Johnson & David E. Kelley	July 17, 2024	T13.23857
As testimony continues, Rusty is compelled to reconsider his legal strategy when the prosecution introduces evidence that reframes the timeline of the murder. Raymond weighs the risks of placing Rusty on the stand versus maintaining a narrower defense. Meanwhile, Tommy receives a disturbing message that may affect the trajectory of the case, hinting at unseen forces at play. The pressure inside the courtroom mirrors the turmoil within the Sabich household. With credibility and perception now central to the outcome, both sides maneuver carefully, aware that a single misstep could determine the verdict.
8	8	"The Verdict"	Anne Sewitsky	David E. Kelley & Sharr White & Miki Johnson	July 24, 2024	T13.23858
In the aftermath of closing arguments, the jury deliberates as Rusty, Barbara, and their children await the outcome that will define their future. Rusty is ultimately declared not guilty, and later discovers that his daughter Jaden was the one who killed Carolyn. He ultimately decides to not expose the truth to protect Jaden, and the family tries to move on.

=== Season 2 ===
No. overall	No. in season	Title	Directed by	Teleplay by	Original release date	Prod. code
9	1	TBA	TBA	David E. Kelley	February 19, 2027	TBA
10	2	TBA	TBA	David E. Kelley & Erica Lipez	February 19, 2027	TBA
11	3	TBA	TBA	Monika Revilla	February 26, 2027	TBA
12	4	TBA	TBA	Jared Frieder	March 5, 2027	TBA
13	5	TBA	TBA	Erica Lipez & Monika Revilla	March 12, 2027	TBA
14	6	TBA	TBA	Warren Hsu Leonard & Dee Johnson & Jared Frieder	March 19, 2027	TBA
15	7	TBA	TBA	Dee Johnson & Jared Frieder	March 26, 2027	TBA
16	8	TBA	TBA	Dee Johnson & Jared Frieder	April 2, 2027	TBA

== Production ==
In February 2022 it was announced that Apple TV+ had ordered an eight-episode miniseries adaptation of Scott Turow's novel Presumed Innocent created by David E. Kelley who also executive produced alongside Dustin Thomason, J. J. Abrams, Rachel Rusch Rich, Ben Stephenson, and Matthew Tinker. Kelley also served as showrunner. In December, Jake Gyllenhaal entered negotiations to star and executive produce. He would be confirmed by January 2023, with Ruth Negga, Bill Camp and Elizabeth Marvel joining the cast. Greg Yaitanes and Anne Sewitsky were hired to direct. In February, additional actors cast included Renate Reinsve, Peter Sarsgaard, O-T Fagbenle, Lily Rabe and Nana Mensah. Noma Dumezweni, Gabby Beans and Sarunas J. Jackson joined the cast in March.

Filming for the series began in February 2023 in Pasadena, California.

On July 12, 2024, Apple TV+ renewed the series for a second season. On October 29, 2024, it was reported that the upcoming novel Dissection of a Murder by Jo Murray is to be used as a source material for the second season. On June 10, 2025, Rachel Brosnahan was cast in a lead role for the second season. On July 29, 2025, Jack Reynor joined the starring cast. On September 11, 2025, Matthew Rhys was cast in a main role. In October 2025, Fiona Shaw and Courtney B. Vance joined the starring cast while John Magaro and Michael Hsu Rosen were cast in recurring capacities for the second season. On November 14, 2025, Lesley-Ann Brandt was cast as a series regular for the second season. On January 23, 2026, Ji-young Yoo joined the cast in a recurring role for the second season. On March 20, 2026, Judith Light was cast in a recurring capacity for the second season.

Filming for the second season began on December 18, 2025, in Los Angeles. Filming moved to Boston, Massachusetts in April 2026. It was also revealed Laure de Clermont-Tonnerre would direct the first episode of the second season.

== Release ==
Presumed Innocent had its world premiere at the 2024 Tribeca Film Festival on June 9, 2024, and was released on Apple TV+ on June 12, 2024. The second season is slated to premiere on February 19, 2027.

== Reception ==
=== Critical response ===
==== Season 1 ====
The review aggregator website Rotten Tomatoes reported a 76% approval rating with an average rating of 7/10, based on 68 critic reviews. The website's critics consensus reads, "Enlivened by an outstanding ensemble, Presumed Innocent isn't guilty of upstaging the original movie but acquits itself well as an entertaining courtroom drama." Metacritic, which uses a weighted average, assigned a score of 64 out of 100 based on 33 critics, indicating "generally favorable reviews".

In a review for Variety, Aramide Tinubu called Presumed Innocent "one of the best legal thrillers to arrive on television in years". She also praised the development of the characters, especially Gyllenhaal's Sabich. Lucy Mangan of The Guardian was less effusive, awarding the show 3 out of 5 stars. Mangan described it as "an efficient tale, with good performances. But it's soullessly slick, fails to properly develop female characters and all feels meaningless". In a negative review for The New York Times, Mike Hale criticized the show's "claustrophobic atmosphere, the emphasis on psychology and trite family drama". Hale also disliked the performances, writing "Gyllenhaal is sweaty, jumpy and over the top".

=== Accolades ===
Year	Award	Category	Nominee(s)	Result	Ref.
2025	Golden Globe Awards	Best Actor in a Television Series – Drama	Jake Gyllenhaal	Nominated	
2025	Independent Spirit Awards	Best Supporting Performance in a New Scripted Series	Ruth Negga	Nominated	
2025	Primetime Emmy Awards	Outstanding Lead Actor in a Limited or Anthology Series or Movie	Jake Gyllenhaal	Nominated	
2025	Primetime Emmy Awards	Outstanding Supporting Actor in Limited or Anthology Series or Movie	Bill Camp	Nominated	
2025	Primetime Emmy Awards	Outstanding Supporting Actor in Limited or Anthology Series or Movie	Peter Sarsgaard	Nominated	
2025	Primetime Emmy Awards	Outstanding Supporting Actress in a Limited or Anthology Series or Movie	Ruth Negga	Nominated	
2025	Satellite Awards	Best Actor in a Drama or Genre Series	Jake Gyllenhaal	Nominated	
2025	Saturn Awards	Best Action / Thriller Television Series	Presumed Innocent	Nominated	
2025	Writers Guild of America Awards	Limited Series	Miki Johnson, David E. Kelley, and Sharr White	Nominated	
