= Seasickness (Widow's Bay) =

- Widow's Bay episode
- Episode no.: Season 1 Episode 7
- Directed by: Sam Donovan
- Written by: Dave Harris
- Cinematography by: Cody Jacobs
- Editing by: Kyle Reiter
- Original release date: May 27, 2026
- Running time: 42 minutes

Guest appearances
- Anthony Atamanuik as Inn Guest; Neil Casey as Kurt; Hamish Linklater as Richard Warren

Episode chronology
← Previous "Our History"	Next → "Your Baggage"

"Seasickness" is the seventh episode of the American comedy horror Widow's Bay. The episode was written by executive story editor Dave Harris, and directed by Sam Donovan. It was released on Apple TV in the United States on May 27, 2026.

The series is set in the fictional New England island town of Widow's Bay, which is afflicted by a centuries-old curse that brings various supernatural evils upon the island. Mayor Tom Loftis wants to make a good impression in order to raise awareness for tourism in town, while also trying to uncover the mysteries surrounding the area. In the episode, Tom and Wyck collaborate with the town founder, Richard Warren, in order to end the curse.

The episode earned extremely positive reviews from critics, with Hamish Linklater earning high praise for his guest appearance. Stephen Root submitted the episode to support his Emmy nomination for Outstanding Supporting Actor in a Comedy Series, which he won.

== Plot ==
Tom finally recovers from the mushroom trip, and is called by Wyck to meet him and Patricia at the museum. They reveal they exhumed the body of Richard, who is still alive due to the island's covenant. Richard explains to Tom the pact he made with the island's entity via the mushrooms, having stored a signed copy of the agreement inside the cylindrical pendant he wears. He believes that the only way to die is if they can kill him outside the island, as the entity has no power outside Widow's Bay.

When Bechir visits to check a noise complaint, Patricia distracts him by stealing his vehicle, and he drives her home. Tom and Wyck take Richard in a boat and depart Widow's Bay, where he hopes he will rapidly age and die. Originally planning to just keep him in the coffin, Tom decides to release him when he pleads. During the journey, Wyck recounts how he accidentally caused the death of his childhood friend during a similar trip years earlier. As they get close to reaching the limits, the waters become violent. Richard changes his mind and attacks them, but they force him to get back in the coffin.

At home, Evan is hanging out with one of the girls from Boston, who teases him into checking Tom's lockbox. Opening it, he discovers photographs revealing that his mother was alive after his birth. The boat reaches the limits of Widow's Bay, and Richard's body turns to dust. Tom and Wyck laugh in relief, believing the curse has ended.

== Production ==
=== Development ===
The episode was written by executive story editor Dave Harris, and directed by Sam Donovan. It marked Harris's first writing credit, and Donovan's second directing credit.

=== Writing ===
Hamish Linklater explained that Richard's change of plans near the episode's climax, "I think he discovers how wonderful life is during the course of Episode 7. He gets stronger and, you know, he wants to live. Who doesn't? You always do, no matter how awful life has been. You don't want to give it up, and that's the place he gets to in that episode." Linklater also enjoyed the use of prosthetics in the episode, "You're blind. You're like this mole, and you're like, Well, no one can touch me. I'm like a mole man. I can do whatever I want. I'm in total disguise. It's like superpowers." As a coincidence, the attack scene on the boat was filmed on Linklater's 49th birthday, with Linklater noting "This is what the universe does to you. It holds a mirror up to how you feel inside."

=== Music ===
The episode features Richard singing a sea shanty titled "The Last Man", with music by Richard Reed Parry of Arcade Fire and lyrics by series writer Neil Casey. The song was released digitally by Milan Records on August 19, 2026.

== Critical reviews ==
"Seasickness" earned extremely positive reviews from critics. Jen Chaney of Vulture gave the episode a 4 star rating out of 5 and wrote, "After this episode, you can't complain that this series isn't making enough of an effort to answer questions about the island. I mean, you can complain if you want, but you would be wrong, and you should probably stop."

Cheryl Eddy of Gizmodo wrote, "We know more than Evan about that whole situation at this point, but that tough conversation is surely coming soon. And finally, the creepy painting that the camera zeroes in on in the final seconds of “Seasickness”? It got a quick mention during Tom’s stay at the inn. Now it comes back around. It's a small boat sailing away surrounded by fierce waves. But who exactly is that small, terrified-looking figure shown in the foreground?"

Bryce Olin of Show Snob wrote, "I have a theory about what I think this means, but I'm not ready to share it all yet because that was an incredible episode of Widow's Bay. We finally have some answers, but I fear it’s not quite time to celebrate yet."

Sean T. Collins of Decider wrote, "We'll see if there's even an island left in a week. Honestly, I wouldn't be surprised if we really are headed for a down ending, one where the island gets its way, though this show is so surprising so often that I wouldn’t bet on any one outcome." Christine Kinori of The Review Geek gave the episode a 4 star rating out of 5 and wrote, "This episode returns to the present as Tom and Wyck deal with Richard. Even though they are on the same team, they keep bantering and bickering like enemies. It is fun watching their chemistry, and we definitely missed them in episode 6."
