= David Miller (cinematographer) =

American cinematographer

- Born: David J. Miller
- Occupation: Cinematographer
- Years active: 1984–present

David J. Miller is an American cinematographer. He won a Primetime Emmy Award in the category Outstanding Cinematography for his work on the television program Veep.
