= Chris Teague =

American cinematographer

- Education: Northeastern University; Columbia University School of the Arts
- Occupation: Cinematographer
- Years active: 2004–present

Chris Teague is an American cinematographer. He won a Primetime Emmy Award and was nominated for one more in the category Outstanding Cinematography for his work on the television programs Russian Doll and Only Murders in the Building.
