= Elizabeth Alderfer =

American actress

- Occupation: Actress
- Years active: 2009–present
- Spouse: Ali Bouzari (m. 2018)

Elizabeth Alderfer is an American actress who is known for her role as Olivia in the Netflix comedy television series Disjointed and her recurring role as Lynette in NBC/Peacock comedy series A.P. Bio. Most recently, she played main character Lizzie on the CBS sitcom United States of Al and appeared in the Apple TV comedy/drama Widow's Bay.

== Biography ==
Alderfer is known for playing the character Olivia in the Netflix original series Disjointed. The character Olivia worked at the pot dispensary and was a love interest of Travis. The show was cancelled after its lone two-part season. She has also played the character Sarah in a few General Electric television ads. From 2019 through 2021, she had a recurring role in the NBC (and later Peacock) sitcom A.P. Bio. Alderfer was cast in a lead role for the 2021 CBS sitcom United States of Al.

She has been married to cook and butcher Ali Bouzari since 2018.

== Filmography ==
Television and film roles
Year	Title	Role	Notes
2013	The Good Wife	Anna Buday	Episode: "Je Ne Sais What?"
2013	Golden Boy	Angie McGuire	Episode: "McKenzie on Fire"
2013	Turtle Island	Laura	Film
2014	Unforgettable	Lauren	Episode: "Till Death"
2015	Forever	Lydia	Episode: "The King of Columbus Circle"
2016	Better Off Single	Evy	Film
2016	Orange Is the New Black	Ann-Marie	Episode: "It Sounded Nicer in My Head"
2016	The Passing Season	Lindsey	Film
2017	Game Day	Ricky	Film
2017	Disjointed	Olivia	Main role
2019	The Passage	Rachel	Episode: "Whose Blood Is That"
2019–2021	A.P. Bio	Lynette	Recurring role (seasons 2–4)
2019	Bull	Whitney Holland	Episode: "Fantastica Voyage"
2021–2022	United States of Al	Lizzy Dugan	Main role
2024	Law & Order: Special Victims Unit	Kelsey Sommers	Episodes: "Fractured", "Economics of Shame"
2026	Widow's Bay	Marissa	Episodes: "The Inaugural Swim"
