= Beach Reads =

- Widow's Bay episode
- Episode no.: Season 1 Episode 4
- Directed by: Sam Donovan
- Written by: Mackenzie Dohr
- Cinematography by: Cody Jacobs
- Editing by: Jen Bryson
- Original release date: May 13, 2026
- Running time: 36 minutes

Guest appearances
- Lauren Bittner as Kris; K Callan as Ruth Livingston; Neil Casey as Kurt; Christian Clemenson as Dr. Calvin Morgan; Emily Davis as Shelby; William Hill as Wayne; Jeff Hiller as Dale; Toby Huss as Reverend Bryce; Sipiwe Moyo as Chelle; Connor Ratliff as Deputy Kent

Episode chronology
← Previous "The Inaugural Swim"	Next → "What to Expect on Your Trip"

"Beach Reads" is the fourth episode of the American comedy horror Widow's Bay. The episode was written by co-executive producer Mackenzie Dohr, and directed by Sam Donovan. It was released on Apple TV in the United States on May 13, 2026.

The series is set in the fictional New England island town of Widow's Bay, which is afflicted by a centuries-old curse that brings various supernatural evils upon the island. Mayor Tom Loftis wants to make a good impression in order to raise awareness for tourism in town, while also trying to uncover the mysteries surrounding the area. In the episode, Patricia is determined to win over the town by throwing a party, using a self-help book as inspiration.

The episode received critical acclaim, with critics praising Kate O'Flynn's performance, writing, and dark tone. O'Flynn and Dale Dickey submitted the episode to support their Emmy nominations for Outstanding Supporting Actress in a Comedy Series, with O'Flynn winning in the category.

== Plot ==
Four days prior to the events of the previous episode, Patricia discovers a self-help book in her mobile library's donation bin, which encourages her to plan the perfect party to prove her social worth. She attends a high school reunion where everyone mostly ignores her, but a woman named Shelby, new to town, bonds with her. Patricia explains the story of a serial killer who almost killed her on one occasion, but her story is widely disbelieved by the women at the reunion. Returning home, she reads in the self-help book an excerpt stating that throwing a party could improve her status.

Inspired, she arranges a Sunset Cocktails party at a bar, but there is very little interest among townspeople. She becomes obsessed with attracting people, to the point that she threatens a rival party into canceling. She also confronts her high school classmate Kris for socially excluding her, but Kris admonishes her for using the murders to get attention. As more tourists trickle in, Patricia serves punch as instructed by the book and quickly becomes the center of attention. During this, Bechir is called up to the party due to a noise complaint.

As the party continues, Patricia delivers a speech recited from the book. As she goes to the kitchen, she argues with Rosemary over her concerns. Bechir arrives and is shocked to find Patricia in a trance. He helps her regain awareness, making her see she has been under an illusion, and that she served her guests punch made with animal parts. She returns to the bar, finding broken cups of punch and no guests. She finds the book, which is revealed to be a grimoire.

Patricia runs to the beach, finding the entranced partygoers walking open-mouthed into the sea, where a bonfire is also placed. As Bechir tries to stop the people from entering, Patricia tries to throw the book in the bonfire, but it possesses her own hand to prevent it. With no other option, she is forced to burn her own hand in order to destroy the book in the bonfire, breaking the spell but leading them all to believe Patricia drugged them. Walking home, she is picked up by Tom and Wyck, who are driving to see Reverend Bryce after he leaves Tom a concerning message. Arriving at the church, they are shocked to discover that Reverend Bryce has hanged himself.

== Production ==
=== Development ===
The episode was written by co-executive producer Mackenzie Dohr, and directed by Sam Donovan. It marked Dohr's first writing credit, and Donovan's first directing credit.

=== Writing ===
Kate O'Flynn explained Patricia's determination to throw the party, "She's probably dreamt of this moment in different iterations throughout her life. It's like prom. There's something Carrie-esque about it. It does kind of remind me of Laura Wingfield in The Glass Menagerie. I remember playing that character sort of dressed like Laura Wingfield, if that makes sense. The shape of the dress and the shoes that aren't quite right. There's a fragility to it and an open want for it to be special that's kind of childlike that just feels right for that scene." She also addressed Reverend Bryce's death at the end, "He's kind of the key, Reverend Bryce, to what the hell is going on, and he's killed himself. So it opens up a whole can of worms, trying to figure out what it was, the information he knew, and where that's taking us."

== Critical reviews ==
"Beach Reads" earned critical acclaim. Jen Chaney of Vulture gave the episode a perfect 5 star rating out of 5 and wrote, "“Beach Reads” is the most consistently uncomfortable, squirmy, and scary episode of Widow's Bay so far. Yes, I absolutely do mean that as a compliment."

Sean T. Collins of Decider wrote, "There's nothing funny about any of this, and nothing haunted-house spooky about it either. It's shocking and sad. The stakes of the events transpiring on this island are real, and high. Death is death. See, I thought, this is what makes Widow's Bay special." Bryce Olin of Show Snob wrote, "What an incredible episode of the series! O'Flynn deserves so much praise for her performance this episode. We're nearly halfway through Widow's Bay season 1, and this story keeps getting better."

Carissa Pavlica of TV Fanatic gave the episode a 4.75 star rating out of 5 and wrote, "On paper, Widow's Bay Season 1 Episode 4, “Beach Reads,” sounds like a fever dream. In execution, it somehow becomes the show's most emotionally grounded episode so far." Christine Kinori of The Review Geek gave the episode a 4 star rating out of 5 and wrote, "It is captivating how the director and the writers wrote this episode. Although we know something is coming, the dancing scene and the lively party distract us from realising the horror of what is going on until it is almost too late. The revelation is jarring and creates an even deeper sense of horror."

=== Accolades ===
TVLine named Kate O'Flynn as a honorable mention for the "Performer of the Week" for the week of May 16, 2026, for her performance in the episode. The site wrote, "Apple TV's hilariously weird horror comedy Widow's Bay has introduced us to a town full of certified oddballs, and this week, Kate O'Flynn took center stage as we learned more about what makes deadpan secretary Patricia tick. O'Flynn has been hysterical all season long with her clipped, neurotic line readings, but here, she added a layer of heartbreaking sadness to Patricia as we saw how desperate she is to break out of her awkward shell and make friends."
