= Our History (Widow's Bay) =

- Widow's Bay episode
- Episode no.: Season 1 Episode 6
- Directed by: Ti West
- Written by: Alberto Roldán
- Cinematography by: Christian Sprenger
- Editing by: Isaac Hagy
- Original release date: May 27, 2026
- Running time: 37 minutes

Guest appearances
- David Dean Bottrell as Pastor Collins; Veanne Cox as Abigail Stevens; Betty Gilpin as Sarah Westcott Warren; Hamish Linklater as Richard Warren; Tom Nowicki as Ezra Lowery

Episode chronology
← Previous "What to Expect on Your Trip"	Next → "Seasickness"

"Our History" is the sixth episode of the American comedy horror Widow's Bay. The episode was written by executive story editor Alberto Roldán and directed by Ti West. It was released on Apple TV in the United States on May 27, 2026.

The series is set in the fictional New England island town of Widow's Bay, which is afflicted by a centuries-old curse that brings various supernatural evils upon the island. Mayor Tom Loftis wants to make a good impression in order to raise awareness for tourism in town, while also trying to uncover the mysteries surrounding the area. The episode is set in 1702, detailing the marriage of Widow's Bay founder Richard Warren and Sarah Westcott, who uncovers his secrets.

The episode earned extremely positive reviews from critics, who praised West's directing, atmosphere, performances and focus on the past.

== Plot ==
In 1702, Sarah Westcott arrives in Widow's Bay by ship, intending to marry the town's founder, Richard Warren. On the wedding night, Richard abruptly leaves the house upon hearing the bells toll, forcing Sarah to stay and take care of his children. She is further isolated upon discovering that the island is plagued by strange illnesses, disappearances, and fear surrounding Richard himself.

One night, Sarah witnesses Richard murder a local man who has accused him of consorting with the devil, and later finds a secret door where the victim's cane is kept. Agitated, she visits pastor Collins for help. He suggests the Devil made a deal with Richard, also revealing that he already killed some townsfolk, including his first wife. Collins consoles her, believing that God sent her to save the town from Richard, and asks her to leave her house door open that night. As Richard sleeps, a man enters the house and repeatedly stabs him. Richard survives the attack, kills the assassin, and swears to seek revenge.

Richard forbids Sarah from leaving the house and locks the door. Nevertheless, she uses the secret door to leave the house, finding a room containing a chair and a cellar door. After finding the exit, she meets Collins, who instructs her to poison Richard's drink, promising to help her and the children in fleeing. That night, Richard drinks the poison, but realizes she is conspiring against him. Richard chokes her before being knocked unconscious by one of his children. As Sarah and the children take a boat to escape the island in a ship, the townsfolk take Richard and tie him, planning to bury him. Richard states that he made a pact with the demonic entity controlling the island to protect the colony during its first winter, warning that sacrifices are necessary to prevent the island's terrors from returning. Despite his pleas, they bury him alive.

In present day, Wyck arrives at Richard's grave and starts digging. Upon hitting the coffin, he asks his colleagues to help him.

== Production ==
=== Development ===
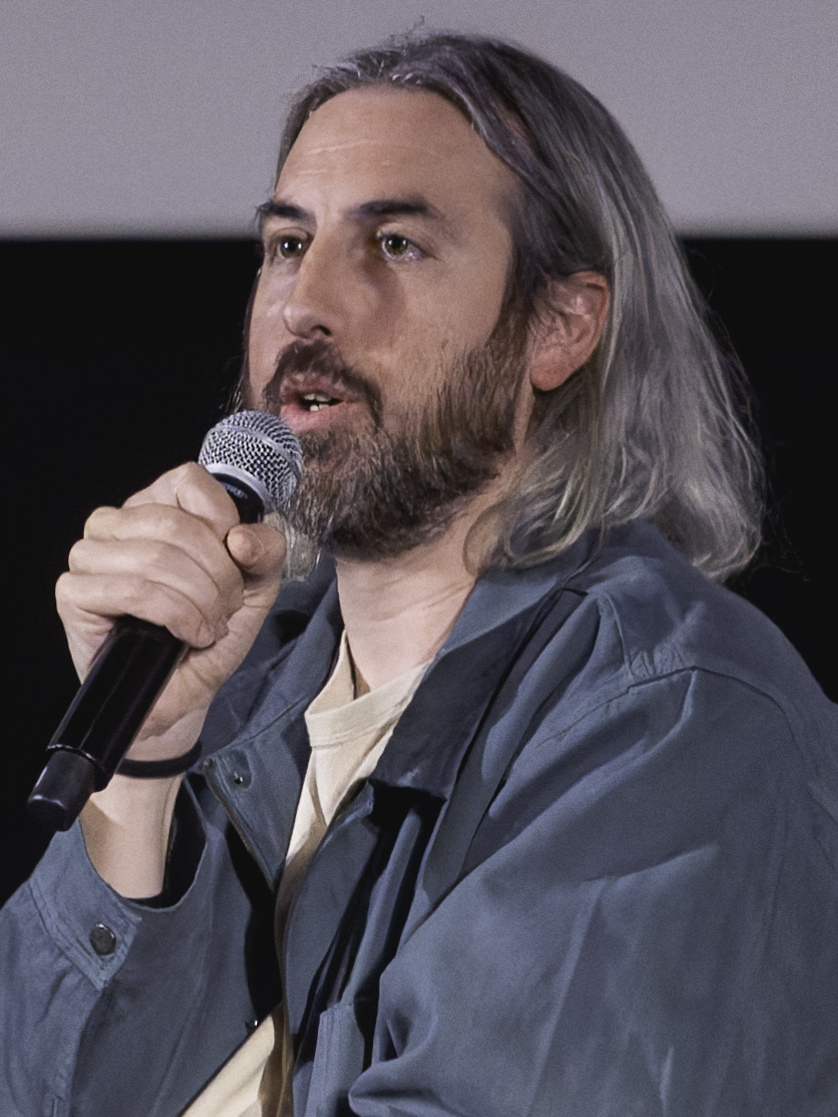
Ti West directed the episode.

The episode was written by executive story editor Alberto Roldán, and directed by Ti West. It marked Roldán's first writing credit, and West's first directing credit. Series creator Katie Dippold said that she wanted to work with West as she liked his films, particularly The House of the Devil, "That movie has such a great sense of nostalgia, and he’s such a master at building atmosphere and dread. We lucked out when he signed on."

Series director Hiro Murai and cinematographer Christian Sprenger decided the episode would use a 1.43∶1 aspect ratio and be shot on an Alexa 265, as opposed to the Alexa 35 used for the other episodes. The squarer aspect ratio was chosen to evoke a sense of claustrophobia for the episode. In addition, a set of Todd-AO spherical lenses, which hadn't been used since the 1960s, were loaned from the American Society of Cinematographers museum, and reconstructed to work with present-day cameras. These decisions were made six to eight months before West started work on the episode, who agreed and added his own ideas, including one to shoot entirely handheld.

=== Writing ===
Dippold said that the idea for the episode came when the writers discussed the beginning of the island, "The more we talked about what it would have been like when the settlers first arrived, the more we started thinking about how interesting it would be to see that and just do a straightforward, dry colonial period piece that leans a little bit into the horror."

The writers also wanted the lead of the episode to be a person with no familiarity with Widow's Bay, with Dippold explaining "The soul of the show is that there are horrors big and small. Sarah is going to this haunted island where there's a plague going on, and her husband turns out to be this monster. But there's also the emotional horror of how she's about to marry someone she's never met before, and she's desperate for it because she doesn't want to be a spinster, as they would have said back then."

=== Casting ===
Hamish Linklater, who played Richard Warren in the episode, said that he was interested in exploring his character's conflicting dilemma, "He thinks he's doing the best for the community that he can under the circumstances. He's going to try to keep as many of them alive by killing as few of them as he possibly can, but the island's going to want what the island's going to want. The ends justify the means in his head. Also, he takes a lot of hallucinogens, so that may cloud his judgment."

== Critical reviews ==
"Our History" earned extremely positive reviews from critics. Jen Chaney of Vulture gave the episode a 4 star rating out of 5 and wrote, "We, the viewers, still don’t know for sure exactly what's causing the island's calamities. But “Our History” does an excellent job of connecting some important dots and furthering our understanding of how the island's past and present are connected. This episode has many fewer laughs than the previous ones. But it's still incredibly compelling and extremely unsettling, which makes sense since Ti West, director of the X trilogy, directed this episode."

Cheryl Eddy of Gizmodo wrote, "Linklater's performance as the glowering 18th-century Warren was fantastically sinister. Linklater's performance as the 300-plus-year-old living corpse Warren is still sinister, but it slathers macabre comedy on top." Eric Francisco of Esquire wrote, "“Our History” is altogether an enlightening prequel that will satisfy Widow's Bay's budding lore hounds and a stand-alone horror about gender roles and marriage as an imprisoning institution. I'm frankly not well-read enough to know the nuances of domestic life in the colonies; I just know it wasn't chill."

Sean T. Collins of Decider wrote, "A couple episodes ago, the show dropped Tom and Wyck to center on Patricia for nearly an entire episode, and I thought that was gutsy. Dropping the entire cast, except for a single scene of Stephen Root shoveling dirt and drinking from a flask while listening to soft rock, and becoming a period piece for an episode — complete with its own old-timey title screen — is gutsier still. For the result to remain an affecting human drama and an uncomfortable horror show, with a light touch that defies the leaden self-seriousness of many small-screen efforts in the genre... did someone on the crew make a deal with the devil?" Bryce Olin of Show Snob wrote, "There's also some sort of curse on the town, which we know is real, because none of the original islanders are allowed to leave the island. We've already seen what happened when Tom’s wife tried to leave. In all these years, the island appears to be waking up and demanding a sacrifice until it's satiated. Then, time goes by before it all happens again."

Carissa Pavlica of TV Fanatic gave the episode a 4.5 star rating out of 5 and wrote, "Don't you just love it when a show can surprise us? It's rarer and rarer every day that we can enjoy entertainment without spoilers, and Widow's Bay has been keeping secrets very well. And I'd venture to guess that nobody expected “Our History” to come to life with Betty Gilpin and Hamish Linklater at the helm." Christine Kinori of The Review Geek gave the episode a 4 star rating out of 5 and wrote, "This episode pushes the show deeper into folk horror as we travel back to 1702, the start of the curse. It is a bit of a jarring shift given where we left off at episode 5, but it still works. This is mostly due to Betty's enigmatic performance as Sarah."

Betty Gilpin won her first Emmy for her guest role on Apple TV+'s horror-comedy series Widow's Bay. Winning Outstanding Guest Actress in a Comedy Series, she went viral for delivering a unique, rhyming acceptance speech.
