= Berlin Town Hall (Berlin, Massachusetts) =

- U.S. National Register of Historic Places
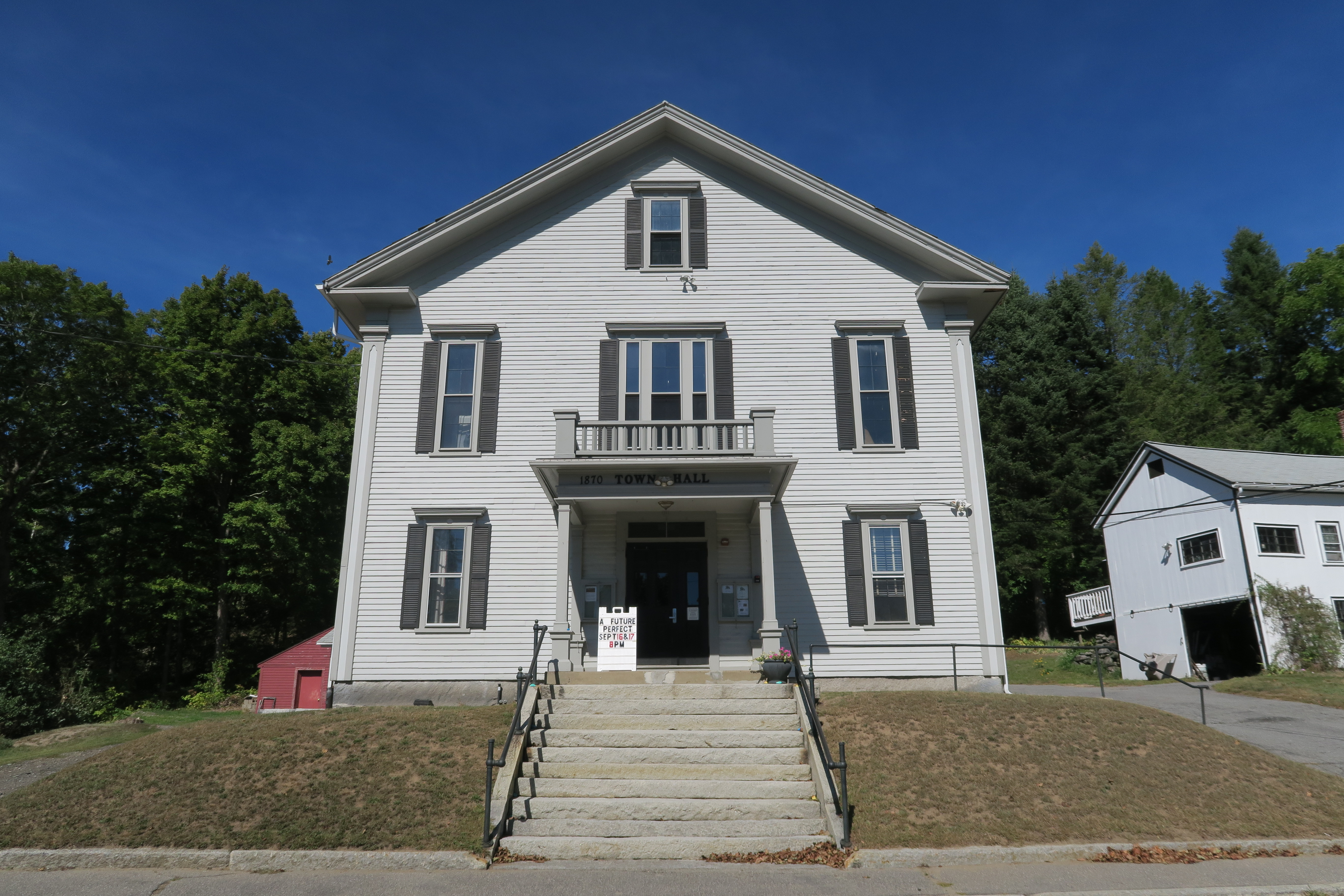
- Berlin Town Hall

- Location within Massachusetts Location within the United States
- Location: 12 Woodward Ave., Berlin, Massachusetts
- Coordinates: 42°22′55″N 71°38′13″W
- Area: less than one acre
- Built: 1870
- Architectural style: Greek Revival, Italianate
- NRHP reference No.: 11000663
- Added to NRHP: September 15, 2011

The Berlin Town Hall is a historic town hall at 12 Woodward Avenue in Berlin, Massachusetts. Built in 1870 and enlarged in 1904, it served as the town hall until 1999, and continues to serve as a local community meeting space. The building was listed on the National Register of Historic Places in 2011.

== Description and history ==
The former Berlin Town Hall is located in the village center of Berlin, facing the triangular green across Woodward Avenue. It is a 2-1/2 story wood frame structure, covered by a gabled roof and finished in wooden clapboards. Its facade has Greek Revival features, including corner pilasters and a portico sheltering a front entry that is flanked by pilasters and topped by a two-light transom window. The portico, built in 1875, is supported by pillars that match the pilasters in detailing, and is topped by a flat roof surrounded by a low balustrade. Its interior is reflective of substantial alterations made in 1909, but retains a number of features of its 1870 construction date.

Berlin was incorporated in 1806, taking parts of several adjacent towns. Its early town meetings were held in the local meetinghouse, which was taken down in 1822, and then in a rotating collection of private and public buildings, including district schoolhouses and taverns. Its first town house, essentially an oversized district school, was built in 1831. By the end of the Civil War, the town's growth had made it evident that a larger building was needed. This structure was built in 1870 to meet that need. The building was used not just for town offices and town meetings, but served as a civic center and meeting place for a variety of community organizations. In 1999 the town moved out of the building, which lacked its growing demand for additional office space. The building was turned over to a local community group, which is now responsible for its maintenance.

It serves as the town hall building in the fictional town of Widow's Bay in the streaming series of the same name.

== See also ==
- National Register of Historic Places listings in Worcester County, Massachusetts
