= Olli Haaskivi =

American-Finnish actor

- Born: Cleveland, Ohio, U.S.
- Education: University of Michigan School of Music, Theatre & Dance
- Occupation: Actor
- Years active: 2012–present
- Father: Kai Haaskivi
- Relatives: Niklas Hagman (cousin)
- Website: ollihaaskivi.com

Olli Haaskivi is an American-Finnish actor.

== Early life and family ==
He was born in Cleveland, Ohio, where his father, Finnish soccer player Kai Haaskivi, was playing for the Cleveland Force. When Haaskivi was eight, the family moved to Florida, where he grew up between Bradenton and Sarasota. His cousin is former NHL hockey player Niklas Hagman.

== Career ==
He attended Booker High School in Sarasota beginning in the 9th grade, and upon graduation he studied musical theatre at the University of Michigan School of Music, Theatre & Dance. During his time there, he performed in a production of Seussical alongside Andrew Keenan-Bolger and Benj Pasek. His first onscreen role was in an episode of Unforgettable in 2012.

In 2019, Haaskivi appeared in a small role opposite Edward Norton in Motherless Brooklyn, directed by Norton. He would make a guest appearance in the Marvel Cinematic Universe miniseries The Falcon and the Winter Soldier as Dr. Nagel. In February 2022, he was cast in Oppenheimer, a biopic about J. Robert Oppenheimer directed by Christopher Nolan, and was cast in a recurring role in the Apple TV+ miniseries The Big Cigar later that year.

== Personal life ==
Haaskivi holds dual citizenship between the United States and Finland. Due to an error made when his father was filing citizenship papers on his behalf, Haaskivi was briefly appeared on a List of Missing Finns.

== Filmography ==
=== Film ===
Year	Title	Role	Notes
2016	From Nowhere	Mr. McGrath	
2016	The Lennon Report	Clerk Andrew Adams	
2017	Freak Show	Tour Guide	
2017	Going in Style	Man Showing House	Uncredited
2017	Who We Are Now	Kevin	
2018	Nancy	Dr. Waters	
2019	Motherless Brooklyn	Hall of Records Clerk	
2020	The MisEducation of Bindu	Mr. Deedham	
2023	Oppenheimer	Edward Condon	
2024	Psycho Therapy	Seymour	
2026	Influenced	Mike	

=== Television ===
Year	Title	Role	Notes
2012	Unforgettable	Man Dressed Like Morgan	Episode: "Endgame"
2014	Boardwalk Empire	Conors' Assistant	Episode: "Golden Days for Boys and Girls"
2015	Hindsight	Roger	Episode: "The Imaginary Line"
2015–2016	Mr. Robot	Shelter Tech	2 episodes
2016	Last Week Tonight with John Oliver	Apple Engineering Assistant	Episode: "Encryption"
2016	Unbreakable Kimmy Schmidt	Shane	Episode: "Kimmy Finds Her Mom!"
2016	Odd Mom Out	Waiter	Episode: "The O.D.D. Couple"
2016	Difficult People	Chester	Episode: "36 Candles"
2016	The Blacklist	Theo	Episode: "The Lindquist Concern (No. 105)"
2017	Z: The Beginning of Everything	Vogel	Episode: "The Right Side of Paradise"
2017	The Detour	Church Assistant	Episode: "The Job"
2017	Orange Is the New Black	Aide	Episode: "Tattoo You"
2017	Power	Tech	Episode: "When I Get Out"
2018	Get Shorty	Reed Jennings	Episode: "Pest Control"
2018	Elementary	Terry Weaver	Episode: "The Visions of Norman P. Horowitz"
2018	The Sinner	Matias Lorcas	3 episodes
2018–2020	Manifest	Isaiah	Recurring role, 5 episodes
2019	Queen Sugar	Bill Linden	Episode: "By the Spit"
2019	The Deuce	Dr. Oser	3 episodes
2019	Cake	Pete	2 episodes
2020	The Plot Against America	Roosevelt Man	Miniseries, episode: "Part 6"
2020	Social Distance	Dean	Episode: "A Celebration of the Human Life Cycle"
2021	The Falcon and the Winter Soldier	Dr. Wilfred Nagel	Miniseries, episode: "Power Broker"
2022	The Marvelous Mrs. Maisel	Marvin	Episode: "Maisel vs. Lennon: The Cut Contest"
2022	Winning Time: The Rise of the Lakers Dynasty	Phil Knight	Episode: "Memento Mori"
2022	Queer as Folk	George	Episode: "Problemática"
2024	The Big Cigar	Arthur A. Ross	Miniseries, 4 episodes
2024	Blue Bloods	Rocco Amato	Episode: "Entitlement"
2024	The Night Agent	Lars	Episode: "Cultural Exchange"
2026	Widow's Bay	Ray	3 episodes
