= Christian Sprenger (cinematographer) =

American cinematographer and television producer

- Education: Columbia College Chicago
- Occupations: Cinematographer, television producer
- Years active: 2006–present

Christian Sprenger is an American cinematographer and television producer. He won three Primetime Emmy Awards and was nominated for five more in the categories Outstanding Cinematography and Outstanding Drama Series for his work on the television programs GLOW, Atlanta, Station Eleven, Mr. & Mrs. Smith and Widow's Bay.
