= Katie Dippold =

American screenwriter

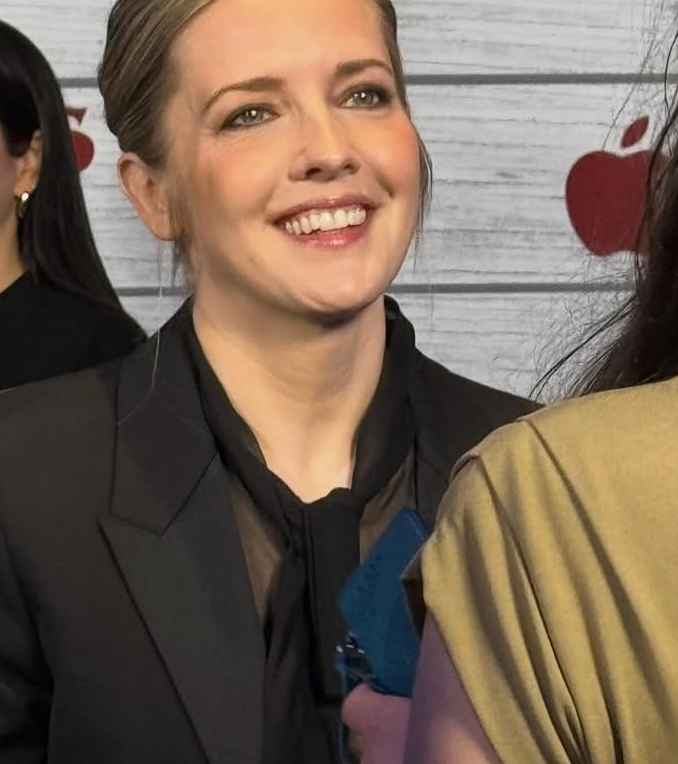
- Dippold in 2026
- Born: Freehold Township, New Jersey, U.S.
- Education: Rutgers University (B.A.J.)
- Occupations: Screenwriter, actress
- Years active: 2004–present

Katie Dippold is an American screenwriter, producer and actor. She was a writer on the Fox series Mad TV (2006–2009) and the NBC series Parks and Recreation (2009–2013). She is the creator, showrunner, executive producer and writer of Widow's Bay (2026–present), for which she won two Primetime Emmy Awards. She also wrote the films The Heat (2013), Snatched (2017), and Haunted Mansion (2023), co-wrote Ghostbusters (2016), and provided a revision of Spy (2015).

She is a frequent collaborator with Paul Feig and Melissa McCarthy and specializes in the comedy and action comedy genres. She has had acting roles in all her Paul Feig-connected films, as well as made a number of guest appearances on series including Parks and Recreation and Fox's Brooklyn Nine-Nine. She played one of the main characters, Byte, in the web series Gemberling, a precursor to Adult Swim's Fat Guy Stuck in Internet.

== Early life and education ==
Dippold was born and raised in Freehold Township, New Jersey, and graduated from Rutgers University with a degree in journalism.

== Career ==
After graduating, Dippold started a career in improvisational comedy at Upright Citizens Brigade Theatre (UCB) in New York City. She still continues to perform improv in Los Angeles. Dippold has appeared as a sketch regular on Late Night with Conan O'Brien and was a cast member on the MTV comedic prank series Boiling Points. In 2006, she became a writer for the twelfth season of MADtv. In 2009, she joined the writing staff of Parks and Recreation where she worked for several seasons.

Dippold wrote the screenplay for the comedic film The Heat (2013), starring Sandra Bullock and Melissa McCarthy, and directed by Paul Feig. Dippold and director Feig later co-wrote the 2016 Ghostbusters. She also wrote the 2023 Disney re-worked adaptation Haunted Mansion. She was listed in 2012 under "10 Screenwriters to Watch" by Variety and "13 People to Look Out For in 2013" in Interview.

Dippold created the television series Widow's Bay (2026), starring Matthew Rhys, Stephen Root and Kate O'Flynn. Some episodes of the series were directed by Hiro Murai.

== Personal life ==
Dippold is in a relationship with former film studio executive Drew Crevello.

In 2016, she went viral for a tweet featuring a photo of herself at a Halloween party dressed as the Babadook while no one else was in costume.

== Filmography ==
=== Film ===
Writer

- The Heat (2013)
- Spy (2015) (Uncredited revision)
- Ghostbusters (2016)
- Snatched (2017)
- Haunted Mansion (2023)

Acting credits

Year	Title	Role
2013	The Heat	ER Nurse
2015	Spy	Katherine
2016	Ghostbusters	Rental Agent
2017	Snatched	Shopper

=== Television ===
Year	Title	Creator	Writer	Producer	Notes
2006–2009	Mad TV	No	Yes	Co-producer	Wrote 54 episodes
2009–2013	Parks and Recreation	No	Yes	Co-producer	Wrote 7 episodes
2026–present	Widow's Bay	Yes	Yes	Executive	Wrote 2 episodes

Acting credits

Year	Title	Role	Notes
2004–2005	Boiling Points	Series regular	
2005	Gemberling	Byte	8 episodes, web series
2006	Munchies	Byte	Episode: "Munchies"
2007	Fat Guy Stuck in Internet	Byte	8 episodes, remake of Gemberling
2009–2013	Parks and Recreation	Mindy Marfan / Woman in Line	4 episodes
2010	Players	Jackie	Episode: "Teardrop Angels"
2013	Comedy Bang! Bang!	Janet Villalobos	Episode: "Rainn Wilson Wears a Short Sleeved Plaid Shirt & Colorful Sneakers"
2015	Brooklyn Nine-Nine	Diane	Episode: "The Wednesday Incident"

== Awards and nominations ==
Year	Award	Category	Nominated work	Result	Ref.
2012	Writers Guild of America Awards	Comedy Series	Parks and Recreation	Nominated	
2013	Writers Guild of America Awards	Comedy Series	Parks and Recreation	Nominated	
2014	American Comedy Awards	Best Comedy Screenplay	The Heat	Won	
2017	Hugo Awards	Best Dramatic Presentation – Long Form	Ghostbusters	Nominated	
2026	Primetime Emmy Awards	Outstanding Comedy Series	Widow's Bay	Won	
2026	Primetime Emmy Awards	Outstanding Writing for a Comedy Series	Widow's Bay (for "Welcome to Widow's Bay")	Won	
