= We Hope You Enjoyed Your Time! =

- Widow's Bay episode
- Episode no.: Season 1 Episode 10
- Directed by: Hiro Murai
- Written by: Katie Dippold
- Cinematography by: Christian Sprenger
- Editing by: Isaac Hagy
- Original release date: June 17, 2026
- Running time: 48 minutes

Guest appearances
- K Callan as Ruth Livingston; Neil Casey as Kurt; Christian Clemenson as Dr. Calvin Morgan; Jeff Hiller as Dale; Sipiwe Moyo as Chelle

Episode chronology
← Previous "Emergency Shelter"	Next → —

"We Hope You Enjoyed Your Time!" is the tenth episode and first-season finale of the American comedy horror Widow's Bay. The episode was written by series creator Katie Dippold, and directed by executive producer Hiro Murai. It was released on Apple TV in the United States on June 17, 2026.

The series is set in the fictional New England island town of Widow's Bay, which is afflicted by a centuries-old curse that brings various supernatural evils upon the island. Mayor Tom Loftis wants to make a good impression in order to raise awareness for tourism in town, while also trying to uncover the mysteries surrounding the area. In the episode, Tom sets out to kill Ruth, as he believes her death can finally stop the curse, while Bechir faces a new dilemma when his wife is nearing labor.

The episode earned critical acclaim, with critics praising the performances, directing, writing, production values and tone.

== Plot ==
During the storm, Tom goes to Ruth's house to kill her, despite Patricia's pleas not to. He enters the house, where Ruth believes he is taking her to the shelter. After Ruth shows him around the house, Tom secretly mixes pills into her tea. He is further pressured when they discuss the trolley problem, where Ruth says she would never choose to harm another person, as bad things happening is just the way of the world.

At the shelter, supplies begin running out and Bechir realizes Chelle will soon go into labor. Bored, Evan and his friends find a tunnel that leads them to a bunker with a cellar door. Dale goes looking for games, but discovers film reels that serve as instructions for sacrificing people to save the townsfolk. It shows that the town has kept Warren's covenant for generations by sacrificing people to the island whenever the church bell rings. Back at Ruth's house, Ruth begins to feel the effects of the pills, but wakes up, and subsequently reveals that 40 years ago, she had an affair with a married man that led to a pregnancy. Unable to look after the child by herself, she gave it to its father and his wife. Tom is shocked when she reveals the daughter was his late wife Lauren, which means Evan is Ruth's grandson, and therefore the last Warren descendant.

Realizing her death will not end the curse, Tom decides to take her to a doctor. However, Bechir arrives and shoots Ruth, having been informed by Patricia about the plan and not wanting his child to be born on the cursed island. When Tom tells him she was not the last descendant, Bechir forces him at gunpoint to disclose the name. Tom lies, claiming he has no idea who it is. Back at the bunker, Evan and his friends are found by Kenny, the custodian at the mayor's office. PJ shuts the door behind him, but it locks by itself, trapping Kenny inside as he gets dragged through the cellar doors and sacrificed to the entity beneath the island. The door unlocks moments later, and an unsettled Evan notices the cellar doors still slightly ajar.

With the sacrifice, the storm stops. Ruth survives the gunshot, and Tom gets Bechir to help him take her to a doctor. The following day as the island recovers, Tom throws Ruth's family heirloom brooch in the sea as Evan looks on. The church bell rings eight times, signaling that eight more sacrifices are required.

== Production ==
=== Development ===
The episode was written by series creator Katie Dippold, and directed by executive producer Hiro Murai. It marked Dippold's second writing credit, and Murai's fifth directing credit.

=== Writing ===
Series creator Katie Dippold said that she wanted the finale to feel smaller in scale compared to the prior episodes, "That's kind of what I loved about it. That it all takes place in two rooms — there's the basement underground and K's little house. I just thought the set design, what they did was incredible. The crochet kits everywhere. The details. It was always gold. But yeah, it's so shrewd to go from the big fireworks of an episode set 300 years ago to all of a sudden, it's ultimately, I think, what we always want, which is about two people talking about the human condition." She also said that she viewed the season as a prequel, further elaborating "Because I feel like we've spent so much time trying to lay the groundwork of what it would be like living on this island. If we started the show living on this island with everything already happening, you wouldn't buy it. I think there could be a lot of very exciting things to do now."

Dippold explained that Tom's conversation with Ruth was done to explore their perspectives on life, saying "that conversation with Ruth and Loftis is really summing up how I think about the entire show, and how you get through life. Like, I think life is a goddamn nightmare. There's a reason I'm a comedy writer, and I think for me growing up, some of my favorite moments are when something really bad has happened, and it's a really dark moment. If I'm in tears, but someone is able to make a joke out of the situation, going from feeling bad or sad to laughter is something I've always really cherished. So I wanted to kind of try that on the screen." She also said that it was essential to follow it with the moral dilemma that Tom faces, "I knew going into the season that I wanted this dilemma to present itself, and I knew the whole episode was going to be Loftis struggling with it. I wasn't sure exactly how it was going to pan out. It became a nice moral conundrum in the room, and that was very interesting. I was surprised how people responded with what they would do in that situation. I got a lot of people pegged wrong."

Director Hiro Murai said that the writers considered different possible endings for the season, "It felt important to burden Tom with another layer of information and dramatic stakes moving forward, but also be able to reset the board. What works well about the show is that we can drop into tangential stories and mundanity. So it was important to put a period mark at the end of the season, and then double back to less urgent stakes at the top of Season Two."

== Critical reviews ==
"We Hope You Enjoyed Your Time!" earned critical acclaim. Saloni Gajjar of The A.V. Club wrote, "I liked that season one's finale is less about what creature might come to the surface, and more about how Tom and everyone else grapple with the recent events internally. It felt like a quieter, more ruminative, necessary — although in no way less funny — way to wrap up the plot just enough."

Jen Chaney of Vulture gave the episode a perfect 5 star rating out of 5 and wrote, "“We Hope You Enjoyed Your Time!”, the 49-minute season one finale of Widow's Bay, delivers everything one could have reasonably hoped for from the conclusion of this corker of an Apple TV show. It also confirms that Widow's Bay is the best new series of 2026 and perhaps even the best series of the year, period. I'm not saying that there definitely won't be a better comedy or drama in the months ahead. What I am saying is: good fucking luck, other shows. You've got some serious mukluks to fill." Ben Travers of IndieWire wrote, "Sure, in the end, you may regret laughing at the thing that kills you, but then again, in those final seconds before it's all over, you may regret not laughing more."

Barry Levitt of TIME wrote, "Widow's Bay successfully pulled the wool over our eyes in ten spellbinding episodes. In causing us to obsess over Warren and his bloodline, it deterred us to the horrors that await in the basement network of Widow's Bay." Eric Francisco of Esquire wrote, "Reliably hysterical but sadder and more touching than I anticipated, the season finale of Widow's Bay is simply this darling show at its best. Matthew Rhys cements a serious potential Emmys run here with a heartfelt and tortured monologue, while creator and showrunner Katie Dippold and director Hiro Murai seem locked into their respective styles of tonally fluid, glossy television."

Sean T. Collins of Decider wrote, "Dippold's concept and writing, Hiro Murai's directing, the perfect cast full of incredible actors creating instantly recognizable and indelible characters, the strength of the world-building as both a parody of Stephen King/H.P. Lovecraft cursed New England towns and as an exemplar of them... Widow's Bay is well constructed in a way that leaves one reaching for comparisons like Mad Men or The Terror on one hand, Cheers or The Golden Girls on the other. I can't wait until the next tourist season begins." Bryce Olin of Show Snob wrote, "If the people of Widow's Bay refuse, well, it's not going to be good. We know, from the first season's terrible events, that more terrors await the residents of Widow's Bay in season 2."

Carissa Pavlica of TV Fanatic gave the episode a 4.85 star rating out of 5 and wrote, "Thank goodness Widow’s Bay was renewed for Season 2. This finale opened up all kinds of new avenues for the story to blossom with more time." Christine Kinori of The Review Geek gave the episode a 4.5 star rating out of 5 and wrote, "The finale sets the perfect stage for the next season as we ponder what the open vault door means. Does the opening mean the entity is free to move about and make the underground tunnel its hunting ground? Remember, the basement is the same room where Richard carried out the sacrifices too."

=== Accolades ===
TVLine named K Callan as the "Performer of the Week" for the week of June 20, 2026, for her performance in the episode. The site wrote, "We kept fearing that Tom would do the deed and snuff out poor Ruth, and then we rejoiced every time she snapped back to life, just because Callan's work was such a pleasure to watch. Ruth even let a big secret drop — that she was secretly the mother of Tom's late wife Lauren! — and Callan's serene, motherly affect helped balance out Tom's jitters... even when she was shouting things like "Pull-out method doesn't work!" In the end, even Tom slipping pills into her tea — and a gunshot wound! — couldn't stop Ruth, and we're thankful for that. Here's hoping we get to learn many more life lessons from her in Season 2."
