= Emergency Shelter (Widow's Bay) =

- Widow's Bay episode
- Episode no.: Season 1 Episode 9
- Directed by: Hiro Murai
- Written by: Bobak Esfarjani
- Cinematography by: Christian Sprenger
- Editing by: Isaac Hagy; Cameron Ross
- Original release date: June 10, 2026
- Running time: 31 minutes

Guest appearances
- Neil Casey as Kurt; Chris Fleming as Todd O'Connor; Betty Gilpin as Sarah Westcott Warren; Jeff Hiller as Dale; Nancy Lenehan as Gerrie Doyle; Sipiwe Moyo as Chelle

Episode chronology
← Previous "Your Baggage"	Next → "We Hope You Enjoyed Your Time!"

"Emergency Shelter" is the ninth episode of the American comedy horror Widow's Bay. The episode was written by consulting producer Bobak Esfarjani, and directed by executive producer Hiro Murai. It was released on Apple TV in the United States on June 10, 2026.

The series is set in the fictional New England island town of Widow's Bay, which is afflicted by a centuries-old curse that brings various supernatural evils upon the island. Mayor Tom Loftis wants to make a good impression in order to raise awareness for tourism in town, while also trying to uncover the mysteries surrounding the area. In the episode, Tom and Wyck work on finding Richard Warren's descendants, as the town prepares for a storm.

The episode earned critical acclaim, with critics praising the episode's tone, character development and moral dilemma.

== Plot ==
In 1702, Sarah Westcott is rowing on a boat with Richard's children, but they struggle to reach anything due to a fog engulfing them. The children begin bleeding from their eyes and mouths, and Frances, the youngest, accidentally falls off into the ocean. Despite Sarah's attempts to rescue her, Frances drifts away.

In present day, a violent storm approaches Widow's Bay; Patricia urges Tom to activate the town's emergency sirens after communication with the mainland is lost. While reviewing Sarah's journal, Patricia realizes that Frances survived and started a family, meaning Richard's bloodline continued on the island for generations, which might be why the curse still exists. Needing to trace Richard's family tree, Tom rings the alarms to get the townsfolk into emergency shelters. This interferes with Bechir's plans to leave town, and he is forced to take shelter with his wife after Wyck asks him not to risk his family's well-being. Wyck also asks Rosemary to help him investigate Richard's family.

The generator in the shelter loses power, so Tom is forced to retrieve equipment needed to restore it. Tom witnesses Todd being swept into the storm and carried into the sky. At the town hall, Wyck and Rosemary show Tom and Patricia the result of their investigation; nearly all of Richard's children died in 1702, except for Frances. Rosemary traced all of Frances' descendants, before finally discovering the last surviving member of the bloodline: Ruth Livingston, Tom's elderly secretary, who is unaware of her family roots. Despite Patricia claiming they cannot stoop that low, Tom and Wyck think she must die to save the rest of town. Tom then leaves, intent on finding and killing Ruth.

== Production ==
=== Development ===
The episode was written by consulting producer Bobak Esfarjani, and directed by executive producer Hiro Murai. It marked Esfarjani's first writing credit, and Murai's fourth directing credit.

=== Writing ===
Kate O'Flynn said she was surprised by the episode's twist, but explained Patricia's stance on whether they should kill Ruth, "Part of it for Patricia is that she has a relationship with Ruth. She knows that woman. It's very tight knit, that community. And obviously it hits on an age thing, there's probably a personal thing there. But I think it's bigger than that. I think she really feels like that's just not the way through. And Patricia is loyal... I love her bravery. I think she's fiercely loyal. And she's someone who will fight to the death for what she believes in. I think that's really amazing."

== Critical reviews ==
"Emergency Shelter" earned critical acclaim. Jen Chaney of Vulture gave the episode a 4 star rating out of 5 and wrote, "With just the finale left to go, this is the point where the momentum should be building to some sort of climactic finale that potentially answers crucial questions about how the island operates. Which is why this week’s entry, “Emergency Shelter,” devotes seven minutes, more than 20 percent of its roughly 32-minute runtime, to a genealogical deep dive presented via overhead projector. Okay, yes, this episode actually does confirm some important things."

Cheryl Eddy of Gizmodo wrote, "we get a bonus Widow's Bay history lesson as part of it, including Frances Warren's unsettling journey from shipwreck survivor to reluctant teenage bride—and some fresh context on that other reluctant bride we've heard about, “the ungrateful Hortense.”" Eric Francisco of Esquire wrote, "The penultimate episode, “Emergency Shelter,” is really one for the books. It's the best showcase yet of creator Katie Dippold's unique voice, with the episode grappling with the most heinous thing you can imagine — the explicit consideration of committing murder — with gags that left me wheezing for air. And it's because of the little things the show does so well that makes Widow's Bay, and this episode in particular, an absolute home run."

Sean T. Collins of Decider wrote, "Other than Chris Fleming's untimely demise and the genuinely chilling cold open, this episode feels mostly like set-up for the finale. It's funny in places and creepy in others, but in both the horror and comedy categories, I'm hoping it's just the calm before the storm." Bryce Olin of Show Snob wrote, "I don't know how creator Katie Dippold keeps doing it, but every episode of Widow's Bay is better than the last. Now, Tom, Wyck, and Patricia are in quite the conundrum heading into the season finale. They have to kill a sweet, old lady in order to end the curse and save the island. Meanwhile, the demon is ready for its next meal."

Carissa Pavlica of TV Fanatic gave the episode a 4.15 star rating out of 5 and wrote, "You don't create a series this watchable that turns so many heads without leaving the best for last. That's right, visitors; we're in for a humdinger of a finale." Christine Kinori of The Review Geek gave the episode a 4.5 star rating out of 5 and wrote, "With the finale only a week away, Widow's Bay has successfully raised the stakes and kept the audience on their toes. Given the recent calibre of shows we have seen, Widow's Bay remains impressive on every front. The question is, will they maintain this pace in the anticipated finale?"

=== Accolades ===
TVLine named Dale Dickey as a honorable mention for the "Performer of the Week" for the week of June 13, 2026, for her performance in the episode. The site wrote, "It was a comedic tour de force, with Dickey holding Mayor Tom — and us — in the palm of her hand as Rosemary finally pinpointed the founder's final living descendant: Tom's kindly old secretary Ruth. In just a few episodes, Widow's Bay has built out a deep roster of eccentric locals, but Rosemary might be our favorite, with Dickey reminding us why she's been making TV shows better for two solid decades now."
