= Ghostbusters (2016 film) =

Film by Paul Feig

- Theatrical release poster
- Directed by: Paul Feig
- Written by: Katie Dippold; Paul Feig
- Based on: Ghostbusters by: Dan Aykroyd; Harold Ramis
- Produced by: Ivan Reitman; Amy Pascal
- Starring: Melissa McCarthy; Kristen Wiig; Leslie Jones; Kate McKinnon; Charles Dance; Michael K. Williams; Chris Hemsworth
- Cinematography: Robert Yeoman
- Edited by: Brent White; Melissa Bretherton
- Music by: Theodore Shapiro
- Production companies: Columbia Pictures; Village Roadshow Pictures; Ghost Corps
- Distributed by: Sony Pictures Releasing
- Release dates: July 9, 2016 (TCL Chinese Theatre); July 15, 2016 (United States)
- Running time: 116 minutes
- Country: United States
- Language: English
- Budget: $144 million
- Box office: $229 million

Ghostbusters (also known as Ghostbusters: Answer the Call) is a 2016 American supernatural comedy film directed by Paul Feig, who co-wrote it with Katie Dippold. Starring Melissa McCarthy, Kristen Wiig, Leslie Jones, Kate McKinnon and Chris Hemsworth, it is a reboot of the Ghostbusters franchise, as well as serving as its third installment. The story focuses on a quartet of eccentric women who start a ghost-catching business after a paranormal encounter.

A third Ghostbusters film had been in various stages of development following the release of Ghostbusters II in 1989. Sony Pictures rebooted the series following the death of the original cast member Harold Ramis in 2014 and because another cast member, Bill Murray, refused to commit to a sequel. Some of the original cast and their family members make cameos in new roles and Ramis is commemorated in the film's closing credits. The announcement of the female-led cast in 2015 drew a polarized response from the public.

Ghostbusters premiered at the TCL Chinese Theatre in Los Angeles on July 9, 2016, and was released in the United States on July 15, by Sony Pictures Releasing through its Columbia Pictures label. The film grossed $229 million worldwide against a $144 million production budget, making it a box-office bomb with losses for the studio of over $70 million. Sony abandoned plans for a sequel, opting instead to continue the original film canon with Ghostbusters: Afterlife (2021).

== Plot ==
Particle physicists and estranged friends Abby Yates and Erin Gilbert co-authored Ghosts from Our Past, a book detailing their paranormal investigations since high school. Erin later disavowed the work, while Abby continues her research at the Kenneth P. Higgins Institute of Science in Manhattan, with engineering physicist Jillian "Holtz" Holtzmann as her partner. Now a professor at Columbia University and in line for tenure, Erin, discovering that Abby republished their book, convinces her to cease its publication if she helps Abby and Holtzmann investigate a haunting at the Aldridge Mansion. They encounter the malevolent ghost of the family’s eldest daughter before she escapes, restoring Erin's belief in the supernatural and friendship with Abby. Erin loses her bid for tenure at Columbia after their vlog becomes viral. Erin offers to join Abby and Holtzmann as the latter are dismissed from Higgins Institute. After stealing equipment, they establish temporary headquarters above a disused Chinese restaurant. They verbosely name themselves "Conductors of the Metaphysical Examination", build trappings and hire jock Kevin Beckman as a receptionist.

MTA staffer Patty Tolan encounters a ghost in a subway terminal built under a former prison and contacts the team. They find the ghost and test Holtzmann's prototype proton packs on the entity, but fail to capture it. They advertise their services with a "no ghosts allowed" logo that Holtzmann had based on a graffiti artist's defacement and the name pundits have labeled them "Ghostbusters". Patty joins the team, providing city expertise, PPE and a repurposed hearse from her uncle dubbed "Ecto-1".

Mad scientist and occultist Rowan North has triggered supernatural events by attracting ghosts across Manhattan with self-developed ionizers modeled after the Ghostbusters' technology, allowing him to experiment and create a dimensional vortex powered by turned PSI energy. When Rowan plants another device at a music festival, the Ghostbusters are called and capture a demonic ghost there, becoming city sensations but antagonizing him. When debunker Doctor Martin Heiss challenges the quartet, Erin releases the ghost as evidence; it throws him out of a window and escapes.

The group is brought before Mayor Bradley and his deputy, Jennifer Lynch, who reveal that they and the DHS are aware of the city's supernatural activities. While privately acknowledging the team's work, they publicly denounce them as fraudsters. The Ghostbusters realizes Rowan is planting his devices along ley lines, with their alignments intersecting at the Mercado Hotel in Times Square, a site of violent occurrences where Rowan's vortex will breach the netherworld, potentially triggering an apocalypse. When they confront him in the building's basement, Abby warns him of his impending apprehension by the police, but unwilling to turn himself in, Rowan electrocutes himself with his main machine. After deactivating it, Holtzmann finds an annotated copy of Ghosts from Our Past that explains the similarity between their technologies. Erin later discovers that Rowan planned his suicide to become a ghost himself.

Rowan returns as a deity-like ghost and attacks the Ghostbusters at their headquarters by possessing Abby, but Patty thwarts him. He then possesses Kevin, escapes to the hotel, opens the portal and releases galvanized ghosts. Rowan subdues the authorities, but the Ghostbusters fight through his army to reach the portal. After leaving Kevin's body, Rowan takes on a kaiju-sized form based on the ghost in the Ghostbusters' logo and becomes rampant. The team uses the Ecto-1's nuclear reactor to incite a nuclear explosion inside the vortex; it reverses the portal, forcing Rowan and the ghosts back in and saving the city. Rowan attempts to take Abby with him, but Erin leaps into the portal and rescues her.

Despite the city's fascination with the supernatural and its lauding of the Ghostbusters as heroes, the mayor continues to denounce them publicly while covertly funding their operations. With added resources, the Ghostbusters move to a disused firehouse, where they build more equipment, including an ecto-containment system. While investigating EVP, Patty hears the word "Zuul".

== Cast ==
- Melissa McCarthy as Doctor Abigail L. "Abby" Yates
- Kristen Wiig as Doctor Erin Gilbert
- Leslie Jones as Patricia "Patty" Tolan
- Kate McKinnon as Doctor Jillian "Holtz" Holtzmann
- Chris Hemsworth as Kevin Beckman
- Neil Casey as Rowan North
- Andy Garcia as Mayor Marth Bradley
- Cecily Strong as Jennifer Lynch
- Michael K. Williams as Agent Cody Hawkins
- Matt Walsh as Agent Henry Rorke
- Charles Dance as Doctor Harold Filmore
- Ed Begley Jr. as Ed Mulgrave Jr.

Original Ghostbusters cast members appear in the film:

- Bill Murray as paranormal debunker Doctor Martin Heiss
- Dan Aykroyd as a taxi driver who is oddly well-versed with parapsychology, much like the Ghostbusters. Aykroyd additionally contributed as an executive producer.
- Ernie Hudson as Patty's uncle, Bill Jenkins, who works as a funeral director
- Sigourney Weaver as Holtzmann's mentor, Doctor Rebecca Gorin
- Annie Potts as the Mercado Hotel's receptionist, Vanessa

Co-producer Ivan Reitman, director of the first two films, has a cameo appearance as a passerby, while original cast member Harold Ramis' son Daniel cameos as a music festival attendant. Ramis' likeness is used on a bust outside Gilbert's office.

Karan Soni, Bess Rous, Eugene Cordero and Milana Vayntrub, who co-starred with Casey on director Paul Feig's television series Other Space (2015), portray deliveryman Bennie, the ghost of Gertrude Aldridge, a bass guitarist and a woman who encounters some ghosts of rats, respectively. Brian Baumgartner, Justin Kirk and Elizabeth Perkins have cameo appearances in the extended cut as Mercado hotel guest Frank, city official Phil Hudson and university professor Phyllis Adler, respectively.

Additionally appearing as ghosts are Dave Allen as the electrocuted ghost, which is additionally dubbed "Sparky", Steve Bannos as a flasher ghost, Adam Ray as the vocal effects of Slimer, who additionally portrays the lead singer of a band, and Robin Shelby as the vocal effects of a female version of the character. Saturday Night Live writer and producer Steve Higgins portrays Dean Thomas Shanks of the Kenneth P. Higgins Institute of Science, while his son John plays a bystander who interrupts an interview with Mayor Bradley. Michael McDonald portrays Jonathan, Zach Woods portrays the Aldridge Mansion's tour guide Garett, Nate Corddry portrays Leif, Toby Huss portrays Officer Stevenson, Katie Dippold plays a rental agent, Sam Richardson portrays a police officer and Jessica Chaffin and Jamie Denbo play waitresses. Ozzy Osbourne, Al Roker, Pat Kiernan, Greg Kelly, Rosanna Scotto and Chris Gethard portray themselves.

== Production ==
=== Development ===
A third Ghostbusters film had been in various stages of development following the release of Ghostbusters II in 1989. Bill Murray, who played Ghostbuster Peter Venkman in the original films, was reluctant to participate. He felt Ghostbusters II was lackluster and was critical of the new scripts he had read. Murray later clarified that his reluctance was due in part to his relationship with Columbia Pictures and Sony, rather than any of his co-stars from the first two films. Dan Aykroyd, who co-starred in and co-wrote the original films, said the studio was aware that "without Murray there may be nothing there" for a sequel, and was considering a way to introduce a new generation of Ghostbusters.

One script, Ghostbusters 3: Hellbent, written by Aykroyd in 1999, had Venkman leaving the Ghostbusters to spend time with Sigourney Weaver's character Dana Barrett; the remaining Ghostbusters, including a new younger member, fought souls evicted from a hellish version of Manhattan known as Manhelltan. The Hellbent script was revised as Ghostbusters in Hell, with plans to replace Murray with Ben Stiller. The story had the Ghostbusters finding a portal to an alternate dimension where "all the worst things about modern urban life" are "magnified"; traffic is stuck in perpetual gridlock, and nobody speaks the same language. Another story idea had Venkman transformed into a ghost.

While the third film remained in development, Terminal Reality developed Ghostbusters: The Video Game and released it in 2009. Aykroyd and Harold Ramis, cowriters of the original films, used the game to explore the Ghostbusters' history. The four original actors, including Murray, voiced their characters, along with other actors from the original films. Aykroyd considered the game "essentially the third movie". The game sold over a million units, prompting Columbia Pictures to move forward with the Ghostbusters franchise. Ramis said the new film would feature the original Ghostbusters but introduce new characters in a script written by Lee Eisenberg and Gene Stupnitsky, co-writers of his 2009 comedy Year One. The film was to be filmed in 2010 and released in 2011.

Around March 2010, while the new script was being developed, Vulture reported Columbia wanted to target a younger audience and that original Ghostbusters director Ivan Reitman was under pressure to step down in place of a younger director. Reitman, along with Murray, Aykroyd, and Ramis, had long-standing contracts in place with Columbia that effectively allowed any of them to veto the development of a Ghostbusters film. Murray told GQ that he felt the script written by Eisenberg and Stupnitsky was poor and "that dream just vaporized", but said that Columbia was pressuring him to make it. Aykroyd defended the script, saying it offered Murray "the comic role of a lifetime". In January 2012, Aykroyd revealed that the film was in "suspended animation" as Murray was still uncooperative. Aykroyd refused to recast the role as he would not make a film that "exploits the franchise". By July, the Eisenberg and Stupnitsky script had been discarded and new writers were working on a script.

Murray's reluctance to commit to the project resulted in the decision to reboot the franchise instead. In September, Reitman suggested a remake of the original Ghostbusters, which would allow them to introduce a new cast. Reitman was working on a Ghostbusters reboot that would be written by Reitman, Etan Cohen, and Aykroyd and filmed in 2013. Following Ramis's death in February 2014, Reitman left the director's role to focus on smaller projects, but remained a producer to help Columbia and Sony find a new director. At this point, the script featured the original Ghostbusters in minor roles.

=== Pre-production ===
In August 2014, Paul Feig was selected as director, with the plans featuring an all-female cast in the reboot. Feig announced the film and his involvement, along with co-writer Katie Dippold, in October, and confirmed his intention to have "hilarious women" star in the film. He added the TV series The Walking Dead partly inspired him, and his goal was to "tell a story you haven't seen before. Or tell a story you've seen before, but in a way you haven't seen it".

Feig said that Sony Pictures Entertainment's co-chairman Amy Pascal had been pushing for comedy writers to produce a script for a new Ghostbusters film for some time. He believed that most of these writers, like himself, did not want to ruin the original film's canon. He also wanted to avoid a premise similar to Ghostbusters II, where the Ghostbusters have to lose their success to begin a new story. This led to the idea of a reboot featuring a new set of characters, an idea that Pascal supported.

=== Casting ===
In January 2015, Feig confirmed his intention to use Kristen Wiig, Melissa McCarthy, Kate McKinnon, and Leslie Jones in the lead roles. At that point, McCarthy had already committed to the film while Sony was in negotiations with the other actresses. Emma Stone was approached to star, but declined in part because she did not want to commit to a franchise. Cecily Strong, who appears in a supporting role, was also considered for a leading role. Aykroyd said he and his family were "delighted" that "these most magnificent women in comedy" had inherited "the Ghostbusters torch".

Bill Murray has a cameo role in the film. In a 2019 interview, he said his decision to participate in the film was because of his friendships with McCarthy and McKinnon, and he felt it was important to support their project.

=== Filming ===
Principal photography began on June 17, 2015, in Boston. Feig and the set dressers Carolyn Lassek and Claudia Bonfe consulted with MIT physicists on set details before shooting. Filming took place in Boston's Chinatown for a few days in early July. Hemsworth was spotted filming some scenes on the Ghostbusters bike in August. After finishing at the old Naval Air Station in South Weymouth, Massachusetts, filming began in Tribeca in New York City on September 12. Three days later, filming took place in Waltham, Massachusetts, and then outside of Columbia University in New York. Filming wrapped on September 19 in New York City. The subway scenes were filmed on a soundstage, as there is no Seward Street station in the New York City Subway. Reshoots took place in Los Angeles in May 2016, and included new scenes that served as a metafictional comment on the internet controversy the film aroused.

=== Visual effects ===
Six companies dealt with the 1,700 visual effects shots, under the supervision of Pete Travers. The main studios were Sony Pictures Imageworks, with 300 shots that included the climactic Times Square sequence and all the proton beams. Moving Picture Company (MPC), had 250 shots that centered on the final battle which included Rowan's monster form. The Australian company Iloura, worked with 500 shots encompassing various ghosts. While most of the work involved CGI, there was an attempt to use various practical effects akin to the original movies, with Travers explaining it was done "not to pay homage, but because it was the best way to achieve the effect".

Stand-ins for the ghosts were created on the set for the actors to interact with. These included actresses suspended by wires, drones as references for flying ghosts, a Slimer puppet and giant balloons for a Stay Puft Marshmallow Man parade balloon. As the ghosts in the film glow, the doubles were covered in light-emitting diodes to provide lighting references for the effects crew.

The climactic Times Square sequence, which starts with the antagonist proclaiming, "Welcome to the glory days of New York City", used special effects to transform it into a bygone mix of stores, buildings and billboards dating back through the decades. These included the Bond Clothing Store, neon signs for the defunct airlines Braniff International Airways (ended in 1982) and BOAC (ended in 1974), billboards advertising the release of the 1976 film Taxi Driver, the 1971 film Isle of the Snake People, and the 1962 to 1964 Broadway theatre production of Beyond the Fringe. The scene also included a combination of the Sony, Canadian Club, and Coca-Cola neon signs that lit up Times Square in different eras, marquees for the long departed Times Square movie theaters showing pornographic films and the 1971 film Fists of Fury, and other chronological anachronisms.

Following a test done by stereoscopic supervisor Ed Marsh, Feig decided to take a different approach to the 3D effects, as the movie was letterboxed even in theaters, so that some objects, mostly regarding the ghosts manifesting themselves, would reach beyond the black bars.

=== Music ===
The film soundtrack album, Ghostbusters: Original Motion Picture Soundtrack, was released by RCA Records on July 15, 2016. Four versions of "Ghostbusters" are included on this soundtrack, each performed by Walk the Moon, Pentatonix, Fall Out Boy featuring Missy Elliott, and the original by Ray Parker Jr. The film score, composed by Theodore Shapiro, was released via digital download on July 8, and CD on July 15 by Sony Classical Records.

== Controversy ==
Ghostbusters received criticism on social media following word of Feig's involvement and the all-female cast, which some suggested was a "gimmick". On its first day of release, the first trailer for the film collected 12,000 likes and 13,800 dislikes from YouTube viewers which, according to David Griner of Ad Week made it "one of the most polarizing in recent memory". By May 2016, the trailer had become the most disliked film trailer on YouTube, and the ninth-most-disliked YouTube video, with 280,000 likes to over one million dislikes. ScreenCrush described the reaction as a campaign "to downvote [the film] into oblivion" by "a certain subset of people on the internet [with] an unhealthy fixation with hating on the Ghostbusters remake". In one interview, Melissa McCarthy felt it was a "very, very, very tiny, tiny group of people" who were misogynistic. Other reasons proposed for the negative reaction to the trailer included a lack of interest in reboots, nostalgia for the original film and a perceived lack of humor in the trailer. The film's IMDb page was also subject to a coordinated effort to lower its rating before the film's release. Some media outlets dubbed it "The Female Ghostbusters".

Todd Martens of the Los Angeles Times suggested fans felt "entitled" to a film that preserved the original as they imagined it. In an interview with Mashable, Ivan Reitman said, "I think there's way too much talk about gender [when it comes to this film]", and "I think that many of the people who were complaining were actually lovers of the [original] movie, not haters of women". Some saw the portrayal of Leslie Jones' character, a "street-smart New Yorker", as a stereotype of African Americans. Jones responded to this criticism on Twitter writing: "Why can't a regular person be a Ghostbuster?" Elizabeth Flock, writing for PBS, said that racism toward Jones may have motivated the vote brigading targeted at the film.

Journalists from The Washington Post and The Atlantic claimed a majority of the criticism constituted misogynistic and anti-feminist comments about the female cast. Wiig was "bummed out" that "there was so much controversy because we were women". Feig said he believed a group of fans had "real issues with women. But there's also a huge group of people who are just concerned about the property, and I completely understand. I'm completely sympathetic to that". In May 2016, additional scenes were shot for the film, which served as a meta-reference to the controversy. In those scenes, the characters upload a video to YouTube and react to unpleasant comments left by viewers.

Filmmaker James Rolfe, creator of the web series Angry Video Game Nerd, declared that he would not see the new film and disliked how it was based in a new universe with no continuity with the previous films. Brooks Barnes of The New York Times and Daniel Friedman of Polygon considered Rolfe's views an example of "fan entitlement", criticizing his haste to judge the film without seeing it and his lack of concern for other remakes of films he admired, such as Teenage Mutant Ninja Turtles. Rolfe received personal attacks online for his position; according to commentators for The Washington Post, Salon, and Polygon, though Rolfe had not mentioned gender, some people considered his motivation misogynistic. Richard Roeper's negative review of the film was also met with criticism on social media and from Salon, who accused him of male bias. Roeper responded: "How insulting would it be to give a film a pass because of good intentions and diversity in the casting? That's not equal treatment; that's condescension". Journalists from The Atlantic and NBC News saw the controversy as part of the culture war and gender divide engaged across social media. They, along with Feig, noted what they saw as commonalities to the events and reactions of the Gamergate controversy in video games.

Following the release of the film, cast member Leslie Jones became the target of racist and sexist abuse on Twitter. A number of users, including Feig, showed support for Jones and criticized Twitter's handling of the situation. Feig was highly critical of the haters on his tweet. On July 19, Twitter suspended the account of then Breitbart writer Milo Yiannopoulos, who had criticized Jones, allegedly for abusive behavior over the previous 48 hours. Conversely, Jones and her character in the film were also accused of promoting negative stereotypes about black people.

In November 2017, Feig expressed regret that the social issues surrounding Ghostbusters affected its public perception and commercial performance. He defended the film, saying: "It was a great regret in my life that the movie didn't do better, 'cause I really loved it. It's not a perfect movie. None of my movies are perfect. I liked what we were doing with it. It was only supposed to be there to entertain people".

In 2018, while promoting the all-female led film Ocean's 8, Sandra Bullock said the reaction that Ghostbusters received was "unfair on a level that I can't even not be mad about talking about. They literally walked into a firing squad. You had five of the most gifted comedian actresses on the planet — I'm just gonna leave it at that. And it doesn't just take five people to make a movie. It takes about 300, so, you know what? Let's back off the meanness. Let's have a year of kindness. The women are here — we're not going anywhere. But this isn't about just women. We like sitting at the table with men. We just want to be invited to their table as well because we like them at our table".

== Release ==
Ghostbusters premiered at the TCL Chinese Theatre in Los Angeles on July 9, 2016. It was theatrically released on July 11 in the United Kingdom and on July 15 in the United States. The film was not released in the Chinese market. A Chinese executive reported that China Film Group Corporation believed it was "not really that attractive to Chinese audiences. Most of the Chinese audience didn't see the first and second movies, so they don't think there's much market for it here".

=== Marketing ===
The first Ghostbusters trailer was released on March 3, 2016. It was viewed 24 million times in 24 hours on Facebook and YouTube, and more than 60 million times across all social media platforms in its first week.

Original Ghostbusters cast members Murray, Aykroyd, Hudson and Potts joined the new cast on the June 8 episode of Jimmy Kimmel Live!, which was entirely dedicated to the new film.

Sony partnered with Snapchat to promote the film with "busting" and "sliming" features. The filter, which features the Ghostbusters logo, allows users to shoot at the character Slimer with their front-facing cameras and a virtual proton pack. In addition, 10-second video teaser ads ran within Snapchat's Discover section. Tor Books published a novelization of the film, written by Nancy Holder.

=== Title ===
The end credits use the title Ghostbusters: Answer the Call. Feig said this was added by the studio, which wanted to avoid confusion by having two films with the title Ghostbusters. He rejected the title Ghostbusters 2016, feeling it would date it. The studio chose Answer the Call; according to Feig: "I just said, 'Don't put it on the front of the movie. If you put it on the end, I don't care'".

=== Home media ===
Ghostbusters was released on DVD, Blu-ray, Blu-ray 3D and Ultra HD Blu-ray on October 11, 2016. The release includes the extended cut of the film, which incorporates over 17 minutes of some deleted scenes:

- One scene shows Erin being ridiculed as a "ghost girl" on the street, which leads to her punching the bully.
- Scenes establishing Erin wanting recognition in the scientific community and thus her dedication to ghost hunting.
- Additional scenes to flesh out the background of Rowan and why he wanted to unleash ghosts. Notably, in this scene it is revealed that most ghosts are men.
- In the final battle, one attempt to end the standoff by "crossing the streams" (as in the original film).
- Several dancing scenes, including one around the film's climax.

In December 2021, director Paul Feig's film was omitted from publicity material for an announced eight-disc boxed set titled Ghostbusters Ultimate Collection containing all other Ghostbusters films in the franchise up to 2021 for release in February 2022. Feig considered this "a mistake […] So, I guess this was just an oversight?" by the distributors.

== Reception ==
=== Box office ===
Ghostbusters grossed $128.3 million in North America and $100.8 million in other territories for a worldwide total of $229 million, against a net production budget of $144 million. Because of the large amount spent on marketing, the studio stated the film would need to gross at least $300 million to break even. Before the release, director Paul Feig said: "A movie like this has to at least get to like $500 million worldwide, and that's probably low".

The Hollywood Reporter estimated the film's financial losses would be over $70 million. A representative of Sony found this loss estimate to be "way off": "With multiple revenue streams ... the bottom line, even before co-financing, is not even remotely close to that number". According to Variety, sources familiar with the film's financing estimate the total loss to be about $75 million, of which, due to co-financing with Village Roadshow, Sony would lose about $50 million. Sony insiders have projected, along with co-financing, a total loss of about $25 million. Bloomberg News estimated the film lost $58.6 million. By August 2016, sources such as Forbes and The Wall Street Journal had begun calling Ghostbusters a box-office bomb. The film's performance contributed to Sony taking a $1 billion writedown in January 2017.

In the United States and Canada, the film opened Friday, July 15, across 3,963 theaters, and was projected to gross $40–50 million in its first weekend. It earned $17.2 million on its first day, including $3.4 million it made from Thursday preview screenings, later going on to earn $46 million in its opening weekend, finishing second at the box office behind The Secret Life of Pets ($50.8 million). It procured the biggest opening weekend ever for director Feig and star Melissa McCarthy and was the biggest live-action comedy debut since Pitch Perfect 2 in May 2015. In its second weekend, the film dropped 54% to $21 million (compared to the first film increasing in its sophomore week by 11%), dropping to fifth at the box office.

Outside North America, Ghostbusters earned $19.1 million in its opening weekend from a handful of markets on 3,900 screens. IMAX contributed $1 million from 105 IMAX screens. It had number one openings in the United Kingdom and Republic of Ireland ($6.1 million), number one in Australia ($3.7 million), and number three in Brazil ($2.2 million). It debuted at number one on the DVD and Blu-ray charts after its release on home media in North America.

In a June 2017 television appearance, Aykroyd blamed the film's underperformance on Feig. According to Aykroyd, Feig refused to shoot additional scenes requested by Aykroyd and Sony until test screenings demonstrated they were necessary, costing an additional $30–40 million in reshoots (although Sony claimed reshoots only cost $3–4 million). He wrote a few days later: "Paul Feig made a good movie and had a superb cast and plenty of money to do it. We just wish he had been more inclusive to the originators. It cost everyone as it is unlikely Kristen, Leslie, Melissa and Kate will ever reprise their roles as Ghostbusters which is sad".

=== Critical response ===
Metacritic review
breakdown (unweighted)

Positive
30 (58%)
Mixed
19 (37%)
Negative
3 (6%)

On the review aggregator website Rotten Tomatoes, 74% of 392 critics' reviews are positive, with an average rating of 6.5/10. The website's consensus reads: "Ghostbusters does an impressive job of standing on its own as a freewheeling, marvelously cast supernatural comedy -- even if it can't help but pale somewhat in comparison with the classic original." Metacritic, which uses a weighted average, assigned the film a score of 60 out of 100, based on 52 critics, indicating "mixed or average" reviews. Audiences surveyed by CinemaScore gave the film an average grade of "B+" on an A+ to F scale, while those surveyed by PostTrak gave a 57% "definite recommend".

Manohla Dargis of The New York Times praised the film as "that rarest of big-studio offerings—a movie that is a lot of enjoyable, disposable fun". In The Guardian, Nigel M. Smith awarded the film four out of five and wrote that the "mean-spirited reception to the film before anyone had seen it does not seem to have put a dampener on the movie itself. Fun oozes from almost every frame; likewise the energy of a team excited to be revolutionising the blockbuster landscape". Mike Ryan of Uproxx gave the film a positive review, praising the characters but feeling CGI was overused. J.R. Kinnard of PopMatters praised the performances and the lack of cynicism, but concluded "it feels like a safe, flavorless recipe prepared from gourmet ingredients". The Village Voice said the film "suffers from the anxiety of influence" of the original, but praised the actors. Mara Reinstein of US Weekly gave the film 2.5 out of 4, commending its actors but criticizing its "lazy script that takes forever to get going" and "uninspired" action sequences.

Observer critic Mark Kermode awarded the film three out of five and wrote: "It would have been great to report that the finished film is good enough to shut the bigoted naysayers up once and for all ...The harsh truth is that it isn’t – at least, not quite". He felt that the film was "generally likeable but uneven". Richard Lawson, writing for Vanity Fair, said the film "spends so much time doing battle with its legacy that it forgets to be its own movie, putting a talented cast to waste and marking another disappointment in this dreadful summer movie season". James Berardinelli felt it was mediocre, and, like many recent comedies, "too long and not funny enough". Richard Roeper of the Chicago Sun-Times gave the film one out of four, criticizing its acting, script, and "cheesy" special effects. In his radio review, Roeper said that the film was one of the worst movies of the year, rating it a D−.

=== Accolades ===
Accolades received by Ghostbusters
Award	Date of ceremony	Category	Nominees	Result	Ref.
Alliance of Women Film Journalists	December 21, 2016	Actress Most in Need of a New Agent	Melissa McCarthy	Nominated	
Alliance of Women Film Journalists	December 21, 2016	Remake or Sequel That Shouldn't Have Been Made	Ghostbusters	Nominated	
Annie Awards	February 4, 2017	Outstanding Achievement, Animated Effects in a Live Action Production	Terry Bannon, Nicholas Tripodi, Daniel Fotheringham, Matt Weaver, and Julien Boudou	Nominated	
Black Reel Awards	February 16, 2017	Outstanding Breakthrough Performance, Female	Leslie Jones	Nominated	
Critics' Choice Awards	December 11, 2016	Best Actress in a Comedy	Kate McKinnon	Nominated	
Empire Awards	March 19, 2017	Best Comedy	Ghostbusters	Nominated	
Hugo Awards	August 11, 2017	Best Dramatic Presentation – Long Form	Katie Dippold & Paul Feig	Nominated	
Kids' Choice Awards	March 11, 2017	Favorite Movie	Ghostbusters	Won	
Kids' Choice Awards	March 11, 2017	Favorite Movie Actor	Chris Hemsworth	Won	
Kids' Choice Awards	March 11, 2017	Favorite Movie Actress	Melissa McCarthy	Won	
Kids' Choice Awards	March 11, 2017	Favorite Movie Actress	Kristen Wiig	Nominated	
Kids' Choice Awards	March 11, 2017	Favorite Squad	Melissa McCarthy, Kristen Wiig, Kate McKinnon, and Leslie Jones	Nominated	
People's Choice Awards	January 18, 2017	Favorite Comedic Movie	Ghostbusters	Nominated	
People's Choice Awards	January 18, 2017	Favorite Comedic Movie Actress	Melissa McCarthy	Won	
People's Choice Awards	January 18, 2017	Favorite Comedic Movie Actress	Kristen Wiig	Nominated	
People's Choice Awards	January 18, 2017	Favorite Comedic Movie Actor	Chris Hemsworth	Nominated	
Saturn Awards	June 28, 2017	Best Fantasy Film	Ghostbusters	Nominated	
Saturn Awards	June 28, 2017	Best Supporting Actress	Kate McKinnon	Nominated	
Seattle Film Critics Society	January 5, 2017	Best Actress in a Supporting Role	Kate McKinnon	Nominated	
Teen Choice Awards	July 31, 2016	Choice Summer Movie	Ghostbusters	Nominated	
Teen Choice Awards	July 31, 2016	Choice Summer Movie Star: Female	Melissa McCarthy	Nominated	
Teen Choice Awards	July 31, 2016	Choice Summer Movie Star: Female	Kristen Wiig	Nominated	
Teen Choice Awards	July 31, 2016	Choice Summer Movie Star: Male	Chris Hemsworth	Nominated	
Women Film Critics Circle	December 19, 2016	Best Comedic Actress	Kate McKinnon	Won	
Women Film Critics Circle	December 19, 2016	Best Ensemble	The cast of Ghostbusters	Nominated	
Women Film Critics Circle	December 19, 2016	Best Female Action Hero	The women of Ghostbusters	Won	

== Franchise ==
=== Canceled sequel ===
After its opening weekend, Sony's president of worldwide distribution, Rory Bruer, told TheWrap that "while nothing has been officially announced, there's no doubt in [his] mind [a sequel] will happen". He also said that Ghostbusters was expected to become an important Sony franchise. The principal cast and Feig had signed on for two sequels.

Some outlets, such as The Hollywood Reporter, expressed doubts about a sequel because of the film's box office performance. Box office analyst Jeff Bock said: "I just can't fathom the creative talents behind it—Feig, McCarthy, Wiig, etc—slogging out another one when the reception to the first one was so mediocre".

In an October interview the same year, Feig told Bustle that a sequel was not in the works, but could be possible if the film performed well on its home release. By November, Feig confirmed that a direct sequel would not be made due to the film's mediocre box office performance.

=== Possible animated series and film ===
The same month, Reitman said in an interview that other Ghostbusters projects were in development. Before Reitman's announcement, an animated series, Ghostbusters: Ecto Force, was slated to be targeting an early 2018 debut. Reitman further clarified plans for future animated films within the Ghostbusters franchise during the July 2017 San Diego Comic-Con, including having one set from the viewpoint of the ghosts rather than the Ghostbusters, and a work as a potential tie-in to the 35th anniversary of the original film in 2019.

== Other media ==
=== Comic book ===
IDW Publishing released a six-part limited series comic, Ghostbusters 101, featuring the original Ghostbusters teaming up with the 2016 team. The first issue was released in March 2017. A five-issue limited series, Ghostbusters: Answer the Call, which continues the adventures of the 2016 team, began in October.

=== Novelizations ===
- Holder, Nancy (June 28, 2016). Ghostbuster (novelization). Macmillan USA: Tor Books. ISBN 978-0765388438.
- Deutsch, Stacia (June 14, 2016). Ghostbusters Movie Novelization. Simon Spotlight. ISBN 978-1481475129.

== See also ==
- List of ghost films
