= Paul Feig =

American filmmaker (b. 1962)

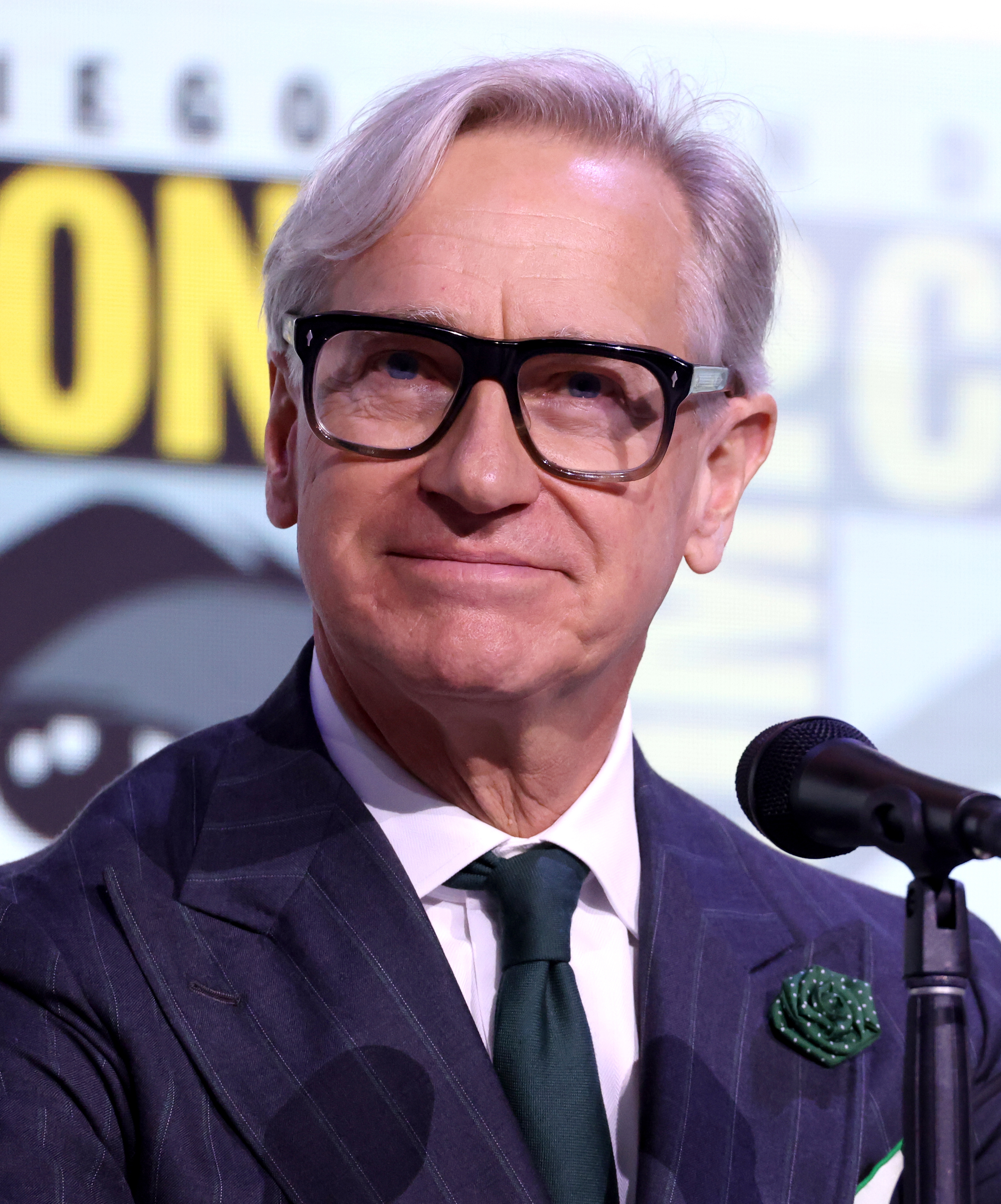
- Feig in 2025
- Born: September 17, 1962 (age 64); Royal Oak, Michigan, U.S.
- Occupations: Film director; producer; screenwriter; actor
- Years active: 1986–present
- Spouse: Laurie Karon (m. 1994)

Paul Feig (/fiːɡ/; born September 17, 1962) is an American filmmaker and actor. He is best known for directing films such as Bridesmaids (2011), The Heat (2013), Spy (2015), Ghostbusters (2016), A Simple Favor (2018), Last Christmas (2019), and The Housemaid (2025). He often collaborates with actress Melissa McCarthy.

Feig created the comedy series Freaks and Geeks (1999–2000) and Other Space (2015). He has also directed several episodes of Arrested Development, Nurse Jackie, Mad Men, The Office, Parks and Recreation, 30 Rock, and Weeds. He received nominations for two Primetime Emmy Awards for writing on Freaks and Geeks, and two for producing and directing on The Office. His most notable acting roles were as Bobby Wynn in the sitcom The Jackie Thomas Show (1992–1993), Tim the Camp Counselor in the comedy film Heavyweights (1995), and Mr. Eugene Pool on the sitcom Sabrina the Teenage Witch (1996–1997).

== Early life ==
Feig was born in Royal Oak, Michigan, on September 17, 1962, the son of telephone operator Elaine Elizabeth (née Artingstall) and Gratiot Avenue store owner Sanford William Feig. He grew up in a Christian Scientist household in Mount Clemens, Michigan. His father was born into a Jewish family, but converted to Christian Science, and met Feig's mother at a church social.

Feig attended Chippewa Valley High School in Clinton Township, Michigan.

== Career ==
=== 1986–2010: Early career, Freaks and Geeks and directorial debut ===
After a year at Wayne State University studying mass communications and theater, Feig moved to Los Angeles and transferred to the University of Southern California School of Cinema. He also worked as a tour guide at Universal Studios Hollywood, embarked on a stand-up comedy act, and landed minor roles on various television shows. Feig also appeared in a number of films, such as Ski Patrol, and in a role alongside Ben Stiller in the 1995 film Heavyweights, in which he played camp counselor Tim. On the first season of Sabrina the Teenage Witch, Feig portrayed Mr. Eugene Pool, Sabrina's science teacher.

With Heavyweights co-scripter Judd Apatow, Feig created the short-lived comedy series Freaks and Geeks, inspired by his experiences at Chippewa Valley High School in Clinton Township, Michigan. The show aired on NBC during the 1999–2000 television season. Eighteen episodes were completed, but the series was canceled after only twelve had aired. Despite the short run, Freaks and Geeks has since maintained a devoted cult following. The show was named in Time magazine's 100 Greatest Shows of All Time, and in summer 2008, Entertainment Weekly ranked Freaks and Geeks as the 13th best show of the past 25 years. Feig was nominated for two Primetime Emmy Awards for writing the show's pilot and the season finale.

Feig made his directorial debut with the drama film I Am David, which premiered at the 2003 Cannes Film Festival. He later directed the Christmas comedy film Unaccompanied Minors (2006).

=== 2011–2016: Bridesmaids and other film works with Melissa McCarthy ===
In 2011, Feig was consulted to direct the Apatow-produced comedy film Bridesmaids. Written by Annie Mumolo and Kristen Wiig, the plot centers on Annie (Wiig), who suffers a series of misfortunes after being asked to serve as maid of honor for her best friend, Lillian, played by Maya Rudolph. Budgeted at $32.5 million, Bridesmaids was both critically and commercially successful, eventually grossing over $288 million worldwide, and served as a touchstone for discussion about women in comedy. The film was nominated for Golden Globe Award for Best Motion Picture – Musical or Comedy and received multiple other accolades, including Academy Awards nominations in the Best Supporting Actress category for Melissa McCarthy and Best Original Screenplay for Wiig and Mumolo.

In 2013, Feig reunited with McCarthy on buddy cop action comedy film The Heat, also starring Sandra Bullock. Written by Katie Dippold, it centers on a mismatched police pairing who must overcome their differences in order to take down a mobster. The film received generally positive reviews from critics, who praised the chemistry, and performances of Bullock and McCarthy, and was a success at the box office, grossing $229 million worldwide against a $43 million budget.

In 2015, Feig wrote, directed, and produced the spy comedy movie Spy for 20th Century Fox, again starring McCarthy. It follows the life of a secret agent, Susan Cooper, trying to expose the black-market. The film received acclaim from critics and became another box office success at an international gross of $235.7 million. It was nominated for two Golden Globe Awards: Best Motion Picture – Musical or Comedy and Best Actress in a Motion Picture – Musical or Comedy for McCarthy. Also in 2015, Feig produced the animated feature The Peanuts Movie for Blue Sky Studios, based on the Peanuts comic strip and characters created by Charles M. Schulz. That same year, it was announced that Feig will direct a film adaptation of Play-Doh for Hasbro Studios, 20th Century Fox, and Chernin Entertainment.

During 2015, Feig also created the science fiction comedy series Other Space for Yahoo's video on demand service Yahoo Screen and wrote the show's first episode. The series stars Trace Beaulieu, Neil Casey, Eugene Cordero, Joel Hodgson, Conor Leslie, Bess Rous, Karan Soni, and Milana Vayntrub as the dysfunctional crew of an exploratory spaceship who become trapped in an unknown universe. Other Space received positive reviews, but was not renewed for a second season due to Yahoo Screen being shut down in 2016. Feig later created a Tumblr to provide direct links to each episode after he reobtained the rights to the series. In 2020, the series was picked up by streaming service DUST.

In 2016, Feig directed and co-wrote the female-driven reboot of the Ghostbusters franchise, starring McCarthy, Wiig, Kate McKinnon, and Leslie Jones as four women who begin a ghost-catching business in New York City. The announcement of the female-led cast in 2015 drew a polarized response from the public and internet backlash, leading to the film's IMDb page and associated YouTube videos receiving low ratings prior to the film's release. The film grossed $229 million worldwide against a production budget of $144 million, becoming the highest-grossing live-action comedy domestically of 2016. However, due to its high production and marketing budget, it is considered a box-office bomb.

=== 2017–present: A Simple Favor and Last Christmas ===
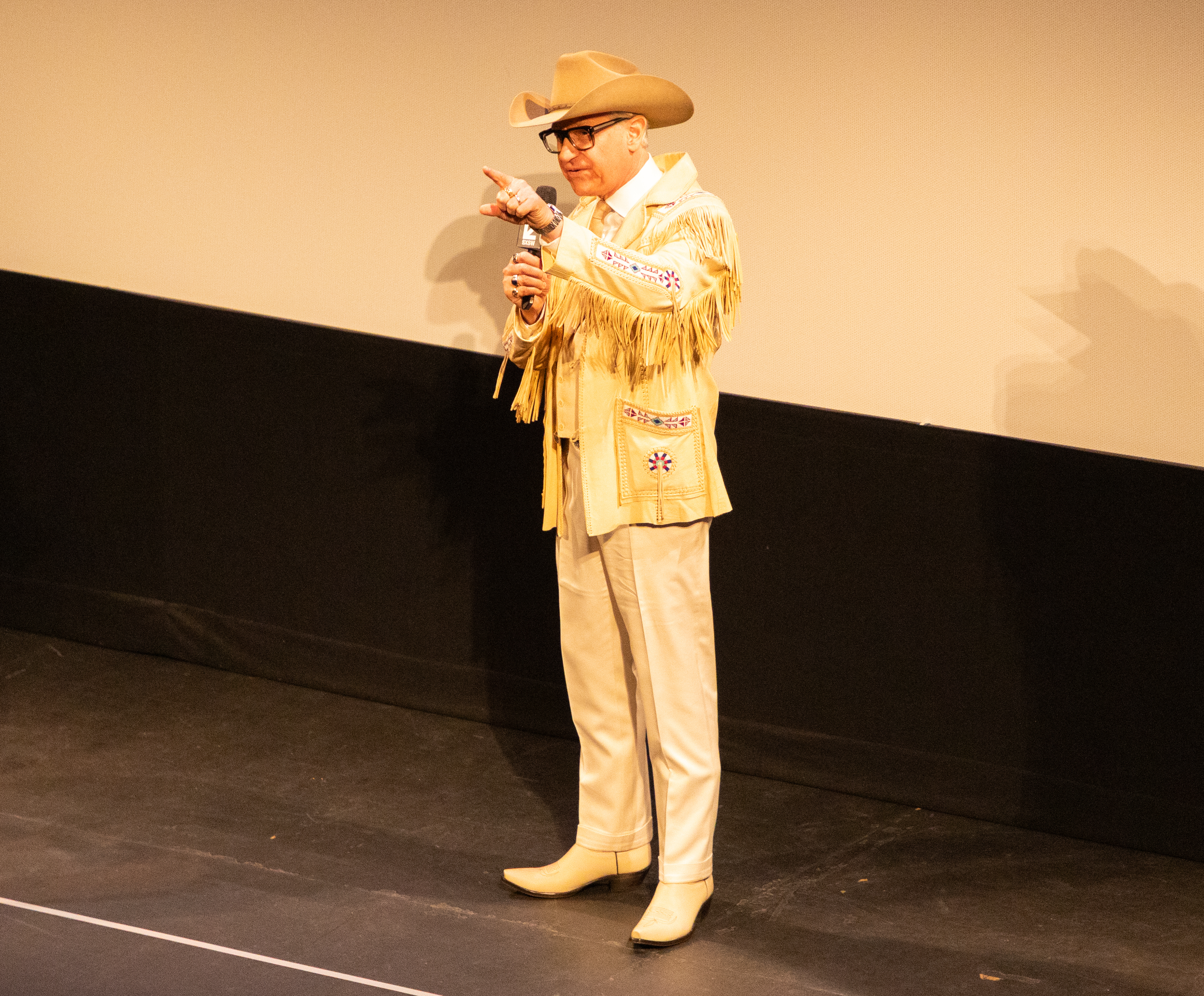
Feig at SXSW 2025 for Another Simple Favor

In 2017, Feig produced Jonathan Levine's comedy film Snatched, starring Amy Schumer and Goldie Hawn as a mother-daughter couple who are abducted while on vacation in South America. The same year, he began production on the comedy thriller A Simple Favor. Based on the 2017 novel of the same name by Darcey Bell, it stars Anna Kendrick, Blake Lively, and Henry Golding, and follows a small town blogger who tries to solve the disappearance of her mysterious and rich best friend. Released in September 2018, the film received generally favorable reviews from critics, with praise for the plot twists and performances of Kendrick and Lively.

In 2018, Feig directed an advertisement for Diet Coke starring Hayley Magnus, which was shown during the Super Bowl. In 2019, he directed the romantic comedy Last Christmas, re-teaming with Golding, who starred in the film alongside Emilia Clarke. The film received mixed reviews and was a box office success, earning over $120 million.

In March 2019, following 20th Century Fox's acquisition by The Walt Disney Company, Feig announced he would be moving his Feigco production studio to Universal Pictures.

In August 2026, Feig entered talks to direct a follow-up film to The Italian Job.

== Filmography ==
=== Film ===
Year	Title			
Year	Title	Director	Producer	Writer
2003	I Am David	Yes	No	Yes
2006	Unaccompanied Minors	Yes	No	No
2011	Bridesmaids	Yes	Executive	No
2013	The Heat	Yes	Executive	No
2015	Spy	Yes	Yes	Yes
2016	Ghostbusters	Yes	Executive	Yes
2018	A Simple Favor	Yes	Yes	No
2019	Last Christmas	Yes	Yes	No
2022	The School for Good and Evil	Yes	Yes	Yes
2024	Jackpot!	Yes	Yes	No
2025	Another Simple Favor	Yes	Yes	No
2025	The Housemaid	Yes	Yes	No
2027	'The Housemaid's Secret' †	Yes	Yes	No

==== Producer only ====
Year	Title	Notes
2015	The Peanuts Movie	
2017	Snatched	
2019	Someone Great	
2020	Holler	Executive producer

==== Acting roles ====
Year	Title		
Year	Title	Role	Note
1987	Zombie High	Emmerson	
1987	Three O'Clock High	Hall Monitor	
1990	Ski Patrol	Stanley	
1990	Zoo Radio	Chester Drawer	Credited as Skylar Billings
1994	Naked Gun 33⅓: The Final Insult	Oscar Audience Member	
1995	Heavyweights	Tim The Camp Counselor	
1996	That Thing You Do!	KMPC D.J.	
1996	My Fellow Americans	Reporter #2	
1997	Life Sold Separately	Clark	
1997	Statical Planets	Renfester	
2000	Bad Dog	Messenger	Short film
2002	Stealing Harvard	Electrician	
2003	I Am David	American Man	
2007	Knocked Up	Fantasy Baseball Guy	
2007	Walk Hard: The Dewey Cox Story	Different DJ	Uncredited
2011	Bad Teacher	Dad at the Car Wash	
2011	Bridesmaids	Guy at Wedding	Uncredited
2013	The Heat	Doctor	Uncredited
2015	Spy	Drunken Guest at Paris Hotel	Uncredited
2017	Ferdinand	Picador	Voice
2018	Song of Back and Neck	Dr. Street	

=== Television ===
Year	Title	Director	Producer	Writer	Notes
1999–2000	Freaks and Geeks	Yes	No	Yes	Also creator and producer; 18 episodes Episode directed: "Discos and Dragons"; Episodes written: "Pilot"; "Tricks and Treats"; "Carded and Discarded"; "Girlfriends and Boyfriends"; "Looks and Books"; "Discos and Dragons"
2001	Undeclared	Yes	No	No	Episode: "Oh, So You Have a Boyfriend?"
2004–2005	Arrested Development	Yes	No	No	Episodes: "Whistler's Mother"; "Let 'Em Eat Cake"; "Switch Hitter"; "Burning Love"; "Ready, Aim, Marry Me!"; "The Cabin Show"; "The Ocean Walker"
2005–2007	Weeds	Yes	No	No	Episodes: "The Punishment Lighter"; "He Taught Me How to Drive By"; "Risk"
2005–2011	The Office	Yes	Executive	No	Episodes directed: "Office Olympics"; "Halloween"; "Performance Review"; "E-mail Surveillance"; "Survivor Man"; "Dinner Party"; "Goodbye, Toby"; "Weight Loss"; "The Surplus"; "Moroccan Christmas"; "New Boss"; "Dream Team"; "Niagara"; "Goodbye, Michael"
2007	30 Rock	Yes	No	No	Episode: "Cleveland"
2007	Mad Men	Yes	No	No	Episode: "Shoot"
2009	Parks and Recreation	Yes	No	No	Episode: "Pawnee Zoo"
2009	Bored to Death	Yes	No	No	Episodes: "Take a Dive"; "The Case of the Lonely White Dove"
2009–2010	Nurse Jackie	Yes	No	No	Episodes: "Nosebleed"; "Ring Finger"; "Comfort Food"; "Twitter"; "Silly String"; "Monkey Bits"; "P.O. Box"; "Sleeping Dogs"; "What the Day Brings"; "Years of Service"
2012	Ronna and Beverly	No	Executive	No	6 episodes
2015	Other Space	No	Executive	Yes	Creator; 8 episodes Episode written: "Into the Great Beyond...Beyond"
2018	The Joel McHale Show with Joel McHale	No	Executive	No	19 episodes
2020–2021	Zoey's Extraordinary Playlist	No	Executive	No	12 episodes
2020–2021	Love Life	No	Executive	No	10 episodes
2022	Welcome to Flatch	Yes	Executive	Yes	Episodes directed: "Pilot"; "Jesus Take The Wheel"; "Dance It Out"
2022	Minx	No	Executive	No	10 episodes
TBA	East of La Brea	No	Executive	No	6 episodes

==== Acting roles ====
Year	Title		
Year	Title	Role	Note
1986	The Facts of Life	Ron	Episode: "The Ratings Game"
1988–1989	Dirty Dancing	Norman Bryant	11 episodes
1990	Thirtysomething	Focus Group Member	Episode: "Pulling Away"
1990	It's Garry Shandling's Show	Chester Bass	Episodes: "The Proposal", "The Honeymoon Show", and "Chester Gets a Show"
1991	Good Sports	Leash	Episodes: "Pros and Ex-Cons", "Electricity", "The Return of Nick", and "A Class Act"
1991	Get a Life	Mark	Episode: "Chris Becomes a Male Escort"
1992	Deep Dish TV	Unknown	Television film
1992–1993	The Edge	Various	7 episodes
1992–1993	The Jackie Thomas Show	Bobby Wynn	18 episodes
1993	Roseanne	Pete	Episode: "A Stash from the Past"
1994	The Good Life	Video Clerk	Episodes: "Paul Dates a Buddhist" and "John Takes Out Melissa"
1994	Hardball	Agent #1	Episode: "Whose Strike Is It Anyway?"
1995	The TV Wheel	Various	Pilot
1996	The Louie Show	Dr. Jake Anderson	6 episodes
1996–1997	Sabrina the Teenage Witch	Mr. Eugene Pool	26 episodes
1997	Men Behaving Badly	Nelson	Episode: "The Sting"
1997	Ellen	Peterson	Episode: "G.I. Ellen"
1998	The Drew Carey Show	Worker #1	Episode: "From the Earth to the Moon"
1999	Freaks and Geeks	Alexander the Guitarist	Uncredited; episode: "I'm with the Band"
2005	Arrested Development	Magician	Episode: "Sword of Destiny"
2005	Early Bird	Unknown	Television film
2009	Nurse Jackie	Mr. Spagnolo	Episode: "Monkey Bits"
2013	The Office	Animal Trainer	Episode: "Stairmageddon"
2014	Maron	Warren	Episode: "Therapy"
2014	Hell's Kitchen	Himself	Episode: "18 Chefs Compete"
2017	9JKL	Himself	Episode: "Pilot"
2018	The Joel McHale Show with Joel McHale	Himself	14 episodes
2020	Zoey's Extraordinary Playlist	Dale	Episode: "Zoey's Extraordinary Mother"
2025	King of Drag	Himself	Guest judge; episode: "Battle of the Boy Bands"

== Bibliography ==
- Feig, Paul (September 24, 2002). Kick Me: Adventures in Adolescence. Crown. ISBN 978-0-609-80943-3.
- Feig, Paul (June 28, 2005). Superstud: Or How I Became a 24-Year-Old Virgin. Crown. ISBN 978-1-4000-5175-5.
- Feig, Paul (September 1, 2008). Ignatius MacFarland: Frequenaut!. Little, Brown Books for Young Readers. ISBN 978-0-316-03993-2.
- Feig, Paul (July 1, 2010). Ignatius MacFarland: Frequency Freakout!. Little, Brown Books for Young Readers. ISBN 978-0-316-08882-4.

== Awards and nominations ==
Year	Association	Category	Work	Result	Ref.
2000	53rd Primetime Emmy Awards	Outstanding Writing for a Comedy Series	Freaks and Geeks	Nominated	
2001	54th Primetime Emmy Awards	Outstanding Writing for a Comedy Series	Freaks and Geeks	Nominated	
2008	60th Primetime Emmy Awards	Outstanding Directing for a Comedy Series	The Office	Nominated	
2009	61st Primetime Emmy Awards	Outstanding Comedy Series	The Office	Nominated	
2009	61st Directors Guild of America Awards	Outstanding Directing – Comedy Series	The Office	Won	
2010	21st Producers Guild of America Awards	Best Episodic Comedy	The Office	Nominated	
2014	16th American Comedy Awards	Best Comedy Director – Film	The Heat	Nominated	
2017	59th Hugo Awards	Best Dramatic Presentation – Long Form	Ghostbusters	Nominated	
