= Hungry Child =

Single by Hot Chip

from the album A Bath Full of Ecstasy
- Released: 4 April 2019
- Genre: House; alternative dance; disco; indietronica
- Length: 6:05 (album version); 3:29 (edit)
- Label: Domino
- Songwriters: Al Doyle; Alexis Taylor; Felix Martin; Joe Goddard; Owen Clarke
- Producers: Hot Chip; Rodaidh McDonald

Hot Chip singles chronology
"Started Right" (2015)	"Hungry Child" (2019)	"Melody of Love" (2019)

Audio sample
- file; help

Music video
- "Hungry Child" on YouTube

"Hungry Child" is a song by English synth-pop band Hot Chip. It is the fifth track on their seventh studio album, A Bath Full of Ecstasy, and was released as its lead single on 4 April 2019 through Domino Recording Company.

== Background ==
The single "Hungry Child" coincided with the announcement of their seventh studio album, A Bath Full of Ecstasy which was announced to be released on 21 June 2019. The song features Valentina Pappalardo on vocals.

== Style ==
The song has been described a mixture of alternative dance, house music, and disco.

Jessica Mao, writing for Dancing Astronaut said that "Hungry Child" "[meshes] indie with electronic in a dreamy, yet groovy number, emitting heavy summer vibes."

== Music video ==
A corresponding music video was released the same day of the track's release. The music video was recorded in the Fall of 2018, and was written and directed by Saman Kesh. Nicholas Weisnet served as the cinematographer. The two actors starring in the music video are Party Down's Martin Starr and Milana Vayntrub. Starr and Vayntrub play a couple exchanging passive-aggressive banter before their lives become inundated with the song.

== Critical reception ==
The track has been positively received by music critics. Philip Sherburne, writing for Pitchfork, called "Hungry Child" a "dance-music aficionado's record par excellence, a collage of hallowed tropes: moody Reese bass, flashing piano stabs, gospel-house vocal harmonies, even squirrelly little synth riffs reminiscent of Isolée". Sherburne further explaining that the lyrics "meets the band's muscular four-to-the-floor throb, creating a sound that's as playful as it is lovelorn". Writing for Noisey, Josh Terry called the song an "excellent single", describing it as "sprawling and pulsing". Billboard included "Hungry Child" on its list of the 32 best dance songs in the first half of 2019.

== Track listing ==
All tracks are written by Hot Chip.

Single track listing
No.	Title	Length
1.	"Hungry Child" (edit)	3:29
2.	"Hungry Child"	6:05
Total length:		9:34

== Personnel ==
Music video The following individuals were credited for the creation of the music video.

- Saman Kesh – writer, director
- Ellis Bahl – co-writer, editor
- Luga Podesta – executive producer
- Sarah Park – producer
- Nicholas Weisnet – cinematographer
- Paola Ezarun – wardrobe
- Jessica Garrison – production design
- London Alley – production company
