= No God =

No God may also refer to:

- "No God", a song by Hot Chip from the 2019 album A Bath Full of Ecstasy
- "No God", a song by Band-Maid from the 2021 album Unseen World
- Nogod, a Japanese heavy metal band

== See also ==
- Atheism, absence of belief in the existence of deities
