= Bess Rous =

American actress

- Born: Short Hills, New Jersey, U.S.
- Education: Rutgers University, New Brunswick (BFA)
- Occupation: Actress
- Years active: 2004–present

Bess Rous is an American actress. On television, she was featured as a series regular on the first season of the TNT crime drama Murder in the First (2014) and the Yahoo! Screen science fiction comedy Other Space (2015). She also appeared in the 2016 reboot of Ghostbusters.

== Early life and education ==
Rous was born in Short Hills, New Jersey. In her childhood, she was an ice dancer and trained at the University of Delaware's Ice Skating Science Development Center in Newark, Delaware when she was 15. She graduated from the Mason Gross School of the Arts at Rutgers University with a BFA in Acting and also holds a certificate from the London Academy of Theatre.

== Career ==
Rous' first onscreen role was a guest appearance on the series Third Watch in 2004. This was followed by further guest spots on series such as Law & Order, Mad Men, Gossip Girl, Law & Order: Special Victims Unit, The Mentalist, and Blue Bloods. She made her film debut in What Just Happened in 2008.

In 2014, Rous landed her first series regular role in the first season of Murder in the First as an employee and mistress of a Silicon Valley prodigy portrayed by Tom Felton. The following year, she appeared as a series regular on Yahoo! Screen's Other Space as Karen Lipinski, the temperamental first officer of an exploratory spaceship. The series aired for one season before Yahoo! Screen was shut down.

Subsequent roles for Rous have included guest appearances on Castle, Under the Dome, Rosewood, Chicago Med, Grey's Anatomy, Proven Innocent, Deputy, and FBI. She also appeared in the 2016 reboot of Ghostbusters, reuniting her with Other Space creator Paul Feig and cast members Neil Casey, Eugene Cordero, Karan Soni, and Milana Vayntrub.

== Personal life ==
Outside of her acting career, Rous is certified by the Alzheimer's Association Speaker's Bureau and serves as a volunteer helping to educate and assist patients and their families who are affected by the disease.

== Filmography ==
=== Film ===
Year	Title	Role	Notes
2008	What Just Happened	Actor's Assistant	
2009	The Hungry Ghosts	Lisette	
2013	Darkroom	Melanie	
2015	Welcome to Happiness	Leah	
2016	Ghostbusters	Gertrude Aldridge Ghost	
2018	Dead Women Walking	Ruth	
2023	Renfield	Caitlyn	

=== Television ===
Year	Title	Role	Notes
2004	Third Watch	Girl One	Episode: "Family Ties: Part 1"
2004	Law & Order	Carolyn Marello	Episode: "Coming Down Hard"
2005	Damage Control	Bessie	2 episodes
2007	Mad Men	Marjorie	2 episodes
2008	New Amsterdam	Gina Warner	Episode: "Legacy"
2009	Loving Leah	Rifka	Television film
2009	Gossip Girl	Fiona	2 episodes
2009	Army Wives	Julie	Episode: "Post and Prejudice"
2009	Law & Order	Leslie	Episode: "Doped"
2010	Law & Order: Special Victims Unit	Camille Walters	Episode: "Branded"
2012	Emily Owens, M.D.	Margo	Episode: "Emily and... The Alan Zolman Incident"
2013	Southland	Christie	Episode: "Under the Big Top"
2013	The Mentalist	Emma Cordry	Episode: "Red Velvet Cupcakes"
2014	Blue Bloods	Jill Gallagher	Episode: "Insult to Injury"
2014	Murder in the First	Ivana West	Main role (season 1)
2014	Castle	Natalie Barnes	Episode: "Child's Play"
2015	Other Space	Karen Lipinski	Main role
2015	Under the Dome	Abby DeWitt	3 episodes
2016	Rosewood	Lara	Episode: "Tree Toxins & Three Stories"
2018	Chicago Med	Lisa Harris	Episode: "Heavy Is the Head"
2018	Grey's Anatomy	Nina Sullivan	Episode: "Everyday Angel"
2019	Proven Innocent	Rachel Clarke	Episode: "SEAL Team Deep Six"
2020	Deputy	Janet Durbin	Episode: "10-8 Search and Rescue"
2021	FBI	Lydia Ryan	Episode: "Hacktivist"
