= Milana Vayntrub =

American actress and comedian (born 1987)

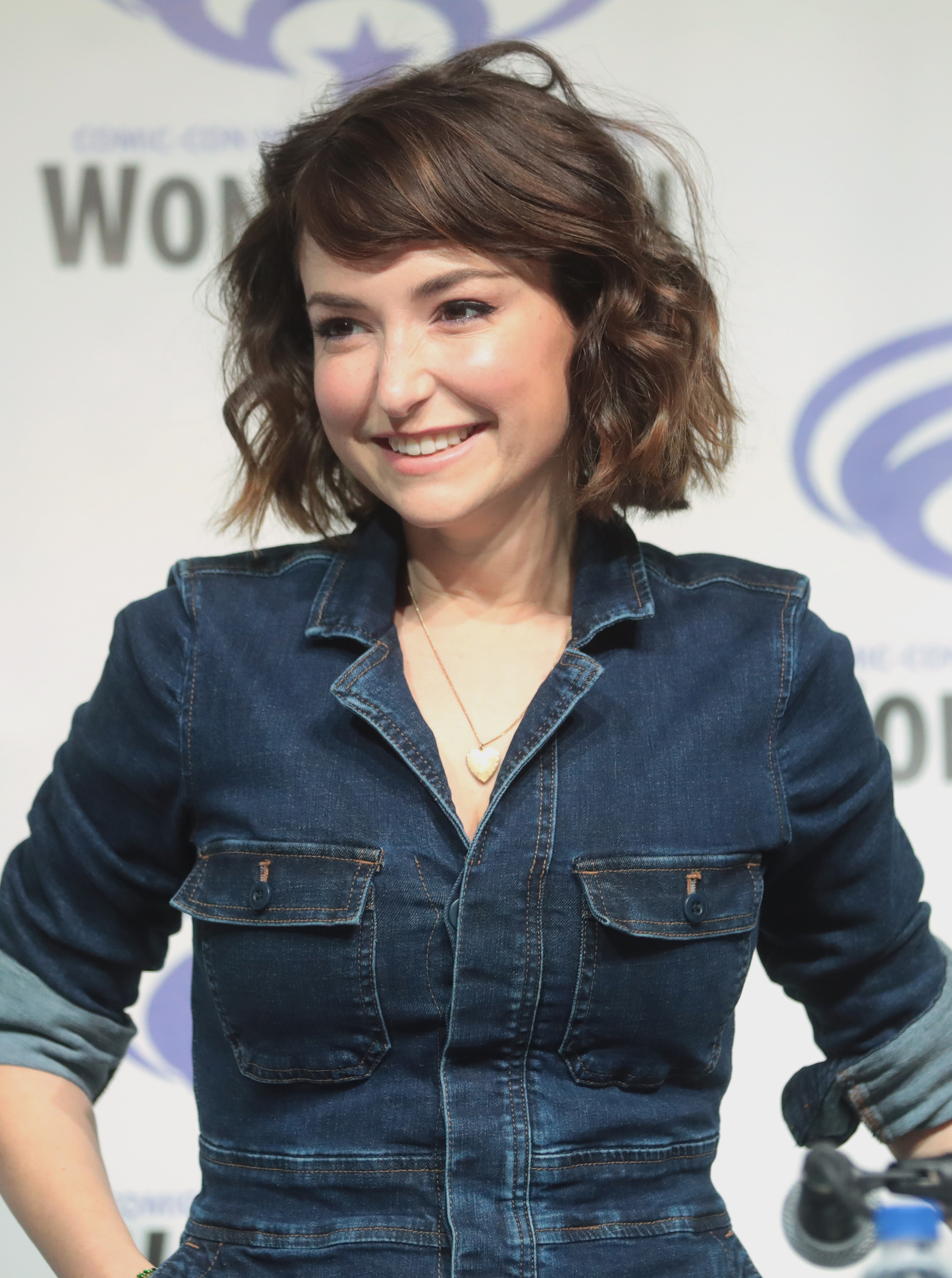
- Vayntrub in 2019
- Born: Milana Aleksandrovna Vayntrub; March 8, 1987 (age 39); Tashkent, Uzbek SSR, Soviet Union
- Education: University of California, San Diego (BA)
- Occupations: Actress; comedian; activist
- Years active: 1995–present
- Known for: Playing saleswoman Lily Adams in a series of AT&T television commercials Voice of Squirrel Girl in Marvel media
- Spouse(s): Married, partner's name unknown
- Children: 1

Milana Aleksandrovna Vayntrub (/ˈvaɪntruːb/ VYNE-troob, Russian: Милана Александровна Вайнтруб; born March 8, 1987) is an American actress, comedian, and activist. She began her career as a child actress and came to prominence for her appearances in AT&T television commercials as saleswoman Lily Adams from 2013 to 2016 and since 2020. In addition to her commercial appearances, she was a series regular on the Yahoo! Screen science fiction comedy Other Space (2015) and had a recurring role on the NBC drama This Is Us (2016–2017).

Vayntrub was cast as Squirrel Girl in the unaired live-action Marvel Television pilot for New Warriors. Since 2018, she has since voiced Squirrel Girl in several Marvel-related media such as the animated franchise Marvel Rising, as well as the 2024 video game Marvel Rivals.

== Early life ==
Milana Vayntrub was born on March 8, 1987, to a secular Jewish family in Tashkent, Uzbek SSR (today Uzbekistan). Her grandparents were from what later became Ukraine. When she was two years old, she and her parents immigrated to the United States as refugees from antisemitism, settling in West Hollywood, California. She started acting in Mattel Barbie commercials at age five, in part to mitigate her family's financial problems. Vayntrub dropped out of Beverly Hills High School after her sophomore year, obtained a GED, and then earned a BA in Communication from University of California, San Diego. She studied improv comedy with the Upright Citizens Brigade.

== Career ==
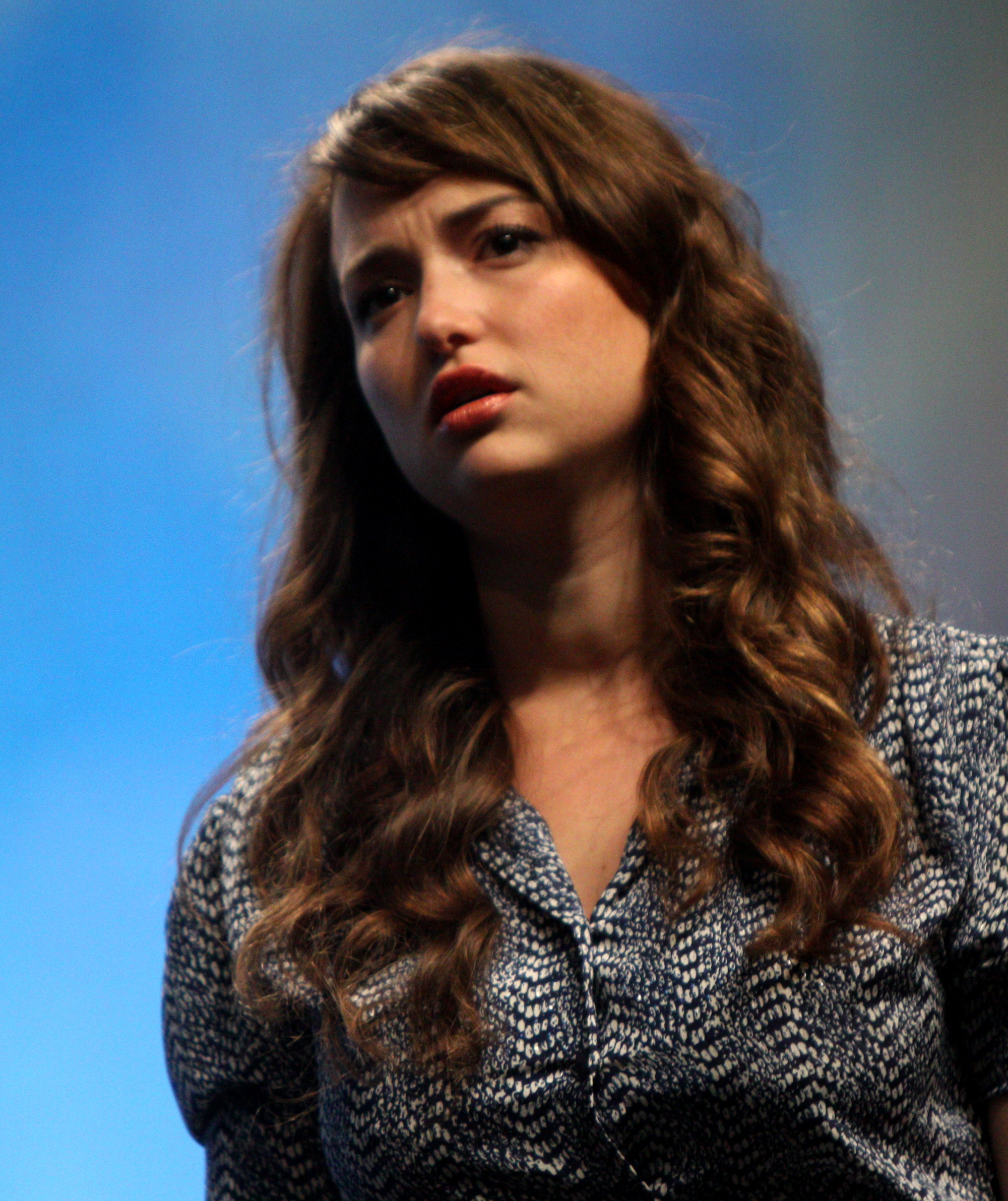
Vayntrub in 2012

Vayntrub made her acting debut appearing in three episodes of the NBC television series ER in 1995. She and Stevie Nelson teamed up to start the YouTube comedy channel Live Prude Girls where they produced a number of shorts. Live Prude Girls went on to be featured on NewMediaRockstars' Top 100 Channels countdown, ranked at number 93. Vayntrub has had small roles in film and television, including Life Happens and Silicon Valley. She has also starred in several CollegeHumor videos.

From 2013 to 2016, Vayntrub portrayed a saleswoman named Lily Adams in a series of TV commercials for AT&T. She returned to the role in 2020. She also portrayed Tina Shukshin as a series regular on the Yahoo! Screen series Other Space, created by Paul Feig, in 2015. The following year, she appeared in Feig's Ghostbusters reboot alongside Other Space cast members Neil Casey, Eugene Cordero, Bess Rous, and Karan Soni. Between 2016 and 2017, she appeared in the television series This Is Us, playing Sloane Sandburg.

In July 2017, Vayntrub was cast in the lead role of Marvel Comics superheroine Squirrel Girl in the New Warriors television pilot for Freeform. Freeform ultimately passed on the series that November, and despite attempts to move the series to another network, it was ultimately cancelled. Despite the series' cancellation, Vayntrub voiced Squirrel Girl in the Marvel Rising franchise. She reprised the role for a six-episode scripted podcast from Marvel and SiriusXM titled Marvel's Squirrel Girl: The Unbeatable Radio Show. Also in 2017, Vayntrub starred in the Eko interactive streaming television series That Moment When as Jill.

Vayntrub starred in the film Mother's Little Helpers (2019), which premiered at South by Southwest. In April 2020, Comedy Central's YouTube channel released three sketches starring Vayntrub and Akilah Hughes as part of a new digital sketch series called Making Fun With Akilah and Milana. She starred in the Quibi streaming television series Die Hart and in the short film The Shabbos Goy as Hannah, both released in July 2020.

Vayntrub played a leading role in the Comedy Central television film Out of Office (2022).

Vayntrub played Olesya Ilyukhina, a Russian engineer and cosmonaut, in Project Hail Mary (2026).

== Activism ==
In January 2016, after visiting Greece and meeting with refugee families fleeing the Syrian Civil War, Vayntrub co-founded a website and social media movement called "Can't Do Nothing" to spotlight the European migrant crisis.

Vayntrub supports abortion rights, and she has stated that she aborted a pregnancy as a college student due to financial concerns.

== Personal life ==
In 2020, Vayntrub was subjected to a wave of online sexual harassment, some of it based on images of her that had been manipulated. The campaign began on an AT&T social media site, and the company came to her defense, stating "We will not tolerate the inappropriate comments and harassment of Milana Vayntrub, the talented actor that portrays Lily in our ads," and shut down comments. Vayntrub asked that the harassment stop in an Instagram live stream, saying: "I'm hurting and it's bringing up, like, a lot of feelings of sexual assault."

Vayntrub has a husband and a son, but has chosen to keep both of their names private.

== Filmography ==
=== Film ===
Year	Title	Role	Notes
2011	Life Happens	Tanya	
2012	Junk	Natasha	
2015	Wrestling Isn't Wrestling	The Ultimate Warrior	Short film
2016	Ghostbusters	Subway Rat Woman	
2019	Mother's Little Helpers	Lucy Pride	Also co-writer and co-producer
2020	The Shabbos Goy	Hannah	Short film
2021	Werewolves Within	Cecily Moore	
2024	Bad Shabbos	Abby	
2026	Project Hail Mary	Olesya Ilyukhina	
TBA	Cupid	TBA	Post-production

=== Television ===
Year	Title	Role	Notes
1995	ER	Tatiana	3 episodes
1997	Days of Our Lives	Young Kristen	
2001–2002	Lizzie McGuire	Posse Member #1 / Cute Burper / Dancer	3 episodes
2004	The Division	Katerina Ominsky	Episode: "Acts of Desperation"
2012	The League	Milana	Episode: "The Hoodie"
2013	Zach Stone Is Gonna Be Famous	Felcia	Episode: "Zach Stone Is Gonna Get Wild"
2013	Food Network Star	Video Caller	Episode: "4th of July Live"
2013	Key & Peele	Vampire	Episode: "Sexy Vampires"
2014	House of Lies	Christy	2 episodes
2014	Californication	Bad Actress	Episode: "Like Father Like Son"
2014, 2016	Silicon Valley	Tara	2 episodes
2015	Other Space	Tina Shukshin	8 episodes
2016	Love	Natalie	2 episodes
2016, 2017	@midnight	Herself	7 episodes (July 22, August 17, 18, December 14 & February 13, 2017, March 29 & 30, 2017)
2016–2017	This Is Us	Sloane Sandburg	8 episodes
2017	That Moment When	Jill	7 episodes
2018	Marvel Rising: Initiation	Doreen Green / Squirrel Girl	Voice role; Television short
2018	Marvel Rising: Secret Warriors	Doreen Green / Squirrel Girl	Voice role; Television film
2018	New Warriors	Doreen Green / Squirrel Girl	Unaired pilot
2018	I Love You, America	Brambi Streeter	Episode: "Steve Schmidt"
2018	Dallas & Robo	Ellie (voice)	8 episodes
2018–2021	Robot Chicken	Peppa Pig, Dino Daughter, Teenage Girl	Voice role; 3 episodes
2019	Marvel Rising: Chasing Ghosts	Doreen Green / Squirrel Girl	Voice role; Television short
2019	Marvel Rising: Heart of Iron	Doreen Green / Squirrel Girl	Voice role; Television short
2019	Marvel Rising: Battle of the Bands	Doreen Green / Squirrel Girl	Voice role; Television short
2019	Marvel Rising: Operation Shuri	Doreen Green / Squirrel Girl	Voice role; Television short
2019	Marvel Rising: Playing with Fire	Doreen Green / Squirrel Girl	Voice role; Television short
2020	Die Hart	Leah	2 episodes
2022	Out of Office	Eliza	Television film
2024	Monsters: The Lyle and Erik Menendez Story	Pam Bozanich	2 episodes
2025	Going Dutch	Celeste Shah	Episode: "Born on the Third of July"

=== Web ===
Year	Title	Role	Notes
2011–2014	CollegeHumor Originals	Various characters	15 episodes
2011–2013	Live Prude Girls (YouTube)	Herself, various characters	36 episodes
2012	Daddy Knows Best	Nancy	Episode: "Game Night"
2016	Jake and Amir Present: Lonely and Horny	Elana	1 episode
2019	Marvel Rising: Ultimate Comics	Doreen Green / Squirrel Girl	Episode 3: "Squirrel Girl"
2019	Kingpin Katie	News Anchor	Episode: "The Breakup"
2019–2021	Dad Feels	Diane	7 episodes
2020	Making Fun With Akilah and Milana	Herself	3 videos
2022	Marvel's Squirrel Girl: The Unbeatable Radio Show	Doreen Green / Squirrel Girl	6 episodes
2023	Dirty Laundry	Herself	Season 2, Episode 10
2024	Um, Actually	Herself	Season 9, Episode 9

=== Music videos ===
Year	Title	Artist	Notes
2007	"Can't Be Saved"	Senses Fail	
2011	"Teenage Tide"	Letting Up Despite Great Faults	
2019	"Hungry Child"	Hot Chip	

=== Video games ===
Year	Title	Role	Notes
2022	God of War Ragnarök	Lúnda	
2024	Marvel Rivals	Doreen Green / Squirrel Girl	
