= The Joel McHale Show with Joel McHale =

American comedy streaming television series

- Genre: Comedy
- Directed by: Liz Plonka
- Presented by: Joel McHale
- Ending theme: "End Credits Song" by Eli Braden
- Country of origin: United States
- Original language: English
- No. of seasons: 1
- No. of episodes: 19

Production
- Executive producers: K.P. Anderson; Joel McHale; Paul Feig; Jessie Henderson; Brad Stevens; Boyd Vico
- Producers: Jordyn Fischer; Charlie Gerencer; Ian Milne; Andi Porter; Jessi Selleh
- Running time: 19–27 minutes
- Production companies: Pygmy Wolf Productions; Free Period Productions; Feigco Entertainment; Lionsgate Television

Original release
- Network: Netflix
- Release: February 18 – July 15, 2018

The Joel McHale Show with Joel McHale is an American comedy television series hosted by Joel McHale that premiered on February 18, 2018, on Netflix. On August 17, 2018, it was announced that Netflix had canceled the series.

== Premise ==
The Joel McHale Show with Joel McHale takes "a sharp, absurdist look at pop culture and news from across the globe, in a fast distillation of everything people are talking about that week. It will feature celebrity guests, comedy sketches, and, of course, video clips from TV, sports, politics, celebrity culture, and every nook and cranny of the internet."

McHale has described how being on Netflix opens the show up to a more global audience allowing the series to cover more international content from outside the United States.

Each episode is developed in the week prior to its premiere so that the content that is included is as topical and relevant as possible. The episode will then feature a mix of footage shot during the previous week and other segments taped further in advance.

== Production ==
=== Development ===
On January 19, 2018, it was announced that Netflix had given the production a series order for a first season consisting of thirteen episodes. The series was set to be hosted by Joel McHale who was expected to executive produce alongside Paul Feig, K.P. Anderson, Jessie Henderson, Brad Stevens, and Boyd Vico. Production companies involved with the show were to include Pygmy Wolf Productions, Free Period Productions, Feigco Entertainment, and Lionsgate Television. The show's production staff is said to feature a mix of both new employees and those who previously worked on McHale's prior show, The Soup.

=== Marketing ===
On February 8, 2018, Netflix released the first official trailer for the series.

=== Cancellation ===
On May 11, 2018, it was reported that Netflix had ordered six additional episodes of the series, which were released simultaneously on July 15, 2018. On August 17, 2018, it was announced that Netflix had canceled the series, reportedly due to low viewership.

== Episodes ==
No.	Title	Directed by	Written by	Original release date
Part 1
1	"Pickler, Pebbles, Pillows and Priestly"	Liz Plonka	K.P. Anderson	February 18, 2018
Featured segments: Sports Segment, Joel's International Corner, and The Wonderful World of Weird Guys Special guest stars: Kevin Hart, Jason Priestley, and Rory Scovel Additional guest stars: Alison Brie, Michael Colter, Jim Rash, Paul Reiser, and Jodie Sweetin
2	"Pizza Ghost"	Liz Plonka	K.P. Anderson	February 25, 2018
Featured segments: Murder Shows, Joel's International Corner, and Joel's Weekly Dump Special guest stars: Kristen Bell, Paul Feig, and David Oyelowo
3	"Dangerous Games"	Liz Plonka	K.P. Anderson	March 4, 2018
Featured segments: Sports Segment, Joel's International Corner, and Future Garbage Special guest stars: Billy Eichner, Paul Feig, Tricia Helfer, and Matt Iseman
4	"Roller Coaster?"	Liz Plonka	K.P. Anderson	March 11, 2018
Featured segments: Shopping for Shut-ins, Joel's International Corner, and Joel's Weekly Dump Special guest stars: Eric Bana, Eric McCormack, and Paul Feig
5	"Coffee Is Delicious"	Liz Plonka	K.P. Anderson	March 18, 2018
Featured segments: Joel's International Corner and Sports Segment Special guest stars: Seth Green and Paul Feig
6	"The Ignored Handshake"	Liz Plonka	K.P. Anderson	March 25, 2018
Featured segments: Joel's International Corner, Go Fund Yourself, and The Last Clip Of The Entire Show That's Also Pretty Funny™ Special guest stars: Drew Barrymore, Adam DeVine, Paul Feig, and Timothy Olyphant
7	"Thank You, Lasagna"	Liz Plonka	K.P. Anderson	April 1, 2018
Featured segments: Joel’s International Corner, The Wonderful World of Weird Guys, Sports Segment, and The Last Clip Of The Entire Show That's Also Pretty Funny™ Special guest stars: Kate Flannery, Gabriel Iglesias, and Russell Wilson
8	"Skip Joel"	Liz Plonka	K.P. Anderson	April 8, 2018
Featured segments: Joel's International Corner, Future Garbage, and The Last Clip Of The Entire Show That's Also Pretty Funny™ Special guest stars: Paul Feig, Galen Gering, Bill Nye, and Kevin Rahm
9	"It's Working"	Liz Plonka	K.P. Anderson	April 15, 2018
Featured segments: Joel's International Corner and Sports Segment Special guest stars: Nicole Byer, Paul Feig, and Christopher Mintz-Plasse
10	"Here Be Dragons"	Liz Plonka	K.P. Anderson	April 22, 2018
Featured segments: Murder Shows, Joel's International Corner, and Joel's Weekly Dump Special guest stars: Paul Feig and Joe Manganiello
11	"...Not"	Liz Plonka	K.P. Anderson	April 29, 2018
Featured segments: Things That Should Not Be, Sports Segment, and The Last Clip Of The Entire Show That's Also Pretty Funny™ Special guest stars: Susan Kelechi Watson and Bellamy Young
12	"Bitterness and Disappointment"	Liz Plonka	K.P. Anderson	May 6, 2018
Featured segments: Joel's International Corner, Shopping for Shut-ins, and The Wonderful World of Weird Gals Special guest stars: Eugenio Derbez and Anna Faris
13	"A Bacon of Hope"	Liz Plonka	K.P. Anderson	May 13, 2018
Featured segments: News Segment Special guest stars: Jon Cryer, Elisha Cuthbert, Patrick Fabian, Christine Ko, Seth Rogen, Adam Scott, Dax Shepard, James Van Der Beek, and Jesse Williams
Part 2
14	"Begin the Binge"	Carrie Havel	Brad Stevens & Boyd Vico	July 15, 2018
Featured segments: Dumbasses, Sports Segment, and That Happened Special guest stars: Paul Feig, Gillian Jacobs, Christopher Mintz-Plasse, and Hannah Zeile
15	"Pink"	Carrie Havel	Brad Stevens & Boyd Vico	July 15, 2018
Featured segments: The Wonderful World of Weird Guys, Fancy Talk Show: Talk Is Really, Really Cheap, Joel's International Corner, and 23andMaury Special guest stars: Shaun Brown, Paul Feig, and Justin Hartley
16	"Michael!"	Carrie Havel	Brad Stevens & Boyd Vico	July 15, 2018
Featured segments: Murder Shows, Joe Manganiello's Crime Watch, Michael, Shopping for Shut-ins, and Joe Manganiello's Snack Watch Special guest stars: Ice-T, Paul Feig, and Joe Manganiello
17	"The Best Damn Country in America"	Carrie Havel	Brad Stevens & Boyd Vico	July 15, 2018
Featured segments: Joel's International Corner, Joel's National Korner, News Segment, and That Happened Special guest stars: Paul Feig, Ray Liotta, and Christopher Mintz-Plasse
18	"Need Another Drink?"	Carrie Havel	Brad Stevens & Boyd Vico	July 15, 2018
Featured segments: Those Little Fuck-Ups, Lou Diamond Phillips' garagefullofmoviesandshit, and Joel's International Corner Special guest stars: Lou Diamond Phillips and Markiplier
19	"We Spent All the Money"	Carrie Havel	Brad Stevens & Boyd Vico	July 15, 2018
Featured segments: Things That Should Not Be Special guest stars: Jack Black, Eli Braden, and Paul Feig

== Reception ==
Official poster

The series has been met with a generally positive response from critics since it premiered. On the review aggregation website Rotten Tomatoes, the series holds an 80% approval rating with an average rating of 7 out of 10 based on 5 reviews.

Dennis Perkins of The A.V. Club praised the premiere giving it a B+ and commenting, "In his enjoyable return, the ever-present green screen nimbus surrounding McHale as he roasts the already-overheated dregs of exceedingly expendable TV seems to wink right along with the host’s undeniable charm, making McHale’s sarcastic skewering as amiably fun as ever." Also complimentary was Mark Dolan of Common Sense Media who gave the series three out of five stars and said, "McHale’s innate likability makes him seem more like a bemused everyman as opposed to a smug, mean-spirited jerk (see Daniel Tosh) or an aloof know-it-all (see Dennis Miller). There's a lot more competition in this arena these days then when The Soup premiered, meaning McHale and his writers will need to work harder to bring big laughs if The Joel McHale Show is going to stand out among all the other media-mocking shows currently populating YouTube, podcasts, and late night TV."

In a more negative review, Sonya Saraiya of Variety commented, "The Joel McHale Show with Joel McHale, like The Soup, is such a lazy cocktail party of a show — unerringly brilliant, but usually graceless — that it seems dated in 2018...What distinguishes it is the snarky, superficial brand of postmodern commentary about reality show narratives and foreign soap operas’ recurring tropes, and it's rewarding to see that again. But again and again, McHale reminds you that all the comedy the writing staff has to offer about these clips is barely elevated vulgarity. Almost every clip would be funnier if McHale just said nothing after airing it." Ken Tucker of Yahoo! was similarly negative saying, "McHale, for all his smirking, remains a smart, likable guy. It's just that he's outgrown this format."
