= Other Space =

2015 American comedy television series

- Genre: Science fiction; Sitcom
- Created by: Paul Feig
- Starring: Trace Beaulieu; Neil Casey; Eugene Cordero; Joel Hodgson; Conor Leslie; Bess Rous; Karan Soni; Milana Vayntrub
- Composers: Orr Rebhun; Erica Weis
- Country of origin: United States
- Original language: English
- No. of seasons: 1
- No. of episodes: 8

Production
- Executive producers: Paul Feig; Owen Ellickson; Jessie Henderson
- Producers: David Glazier; David Soldinger; Joshua Thurston
- Camera setup: Single-camera
- Running time: 25–27 minutes
- Production companies: Warner Bros. Television; Feigco Entertainment; Abominable Pictures; Yahoo! Studios

Original release
- Network: Yahoo! Screen
- Release: April 14, 2015

Other Space is an American science fiction comedy television series created by Paul Feig for Yahoo! Screen. Set in the 22nd century, it follows the dysfunctional crew of an exploratory spaceship who become trapped in an unknown universe.

The first season of eight episodes premiered on April 14, 2015. The series was not renewed for a second season due to Yahoo! Screen being shut down the following year. The rights for Other Space were later picked up by DUST, which began streaming the series in August 2020.

== Premise ==
Other Space takes place in the year 2105, where a multi-national corporate coalition has created the Universal Mapping Project (UMP) to make scientific inquiries throughout the known universe. Among its exploratory space vessels is the UMP Cruiser, a veteran ship that was once used as the setting for a reality television series. Hoping to reignite public interest in their mission, UMP officials give command of the Cruiser to the young and eager Stewart Lipinski for his first mission. Stewart's older sister Karen is assigned to be his second-in-command, against both of their wishes.

Joining Stewart and Karen on board the Cruiser is Stewart's best friend Michael Newman, who is relegated to third-in-command instead of the second-in-command position he assumed he would receive. Stewart hires his unrequited love interest Tina Shukshin as the navigator of the ship due to his romantic feelings for her. Kent Woolworth, the son of UMP Chairwoman Helen Woolworth, is named science officer, which Kent acknowledges is the result of nepotism. Functions on the Cruiser are monitored by Natasha, the ship's computer and former hospitality bot at a casino. The only experienced member of the crew is engineer Zalian Fletcher, whose cognitive functions have been impaired by prolonged exposure to radiation. Zalian is accompanied by his friend A.R.T., a robot stowaway living on the vessel.

During the crew's maiden voyage, the Cruiser is sucked into a wormhole, trapping them in an unexplored universe. The crew attempts to return home while surviving perils and making new discoveries.

== Cast and characters ==
=== Main ===
- Karan Soni as Stewart Lipinski:
  The captain of the Cruiser. Enthusiastic and optimistic, Stewart desires to keep his crew's morale high and make new discoveries. As he laments in the final episode, he appears to be the only member of the crew eager to explore the universe. He often finds himself in conflict with his older sister Karen due to their clashing personalities and her resentment towards him being named captain over her. He also harbors unrequited feelings for Tina, with his failure to win her love being a recurring theme in the show. Series creator Paul Feig described Stewart as a smarter and intuitive teenage version of himself, with his enthusiasm being his greatest skill. Roni Akurati portrays Stewart as a child.
- Bess Rous as Karen Lipinski:
  The first officer of the Cruiser. Unlike her younger brother Stewart, Karen is stern, temperamental, and unconcerned with what others think of her. She resents Stewart for constantly getting what she feels she deserves to have, including being the vessel's captain, but also admits that he deserves his successes. Michael believes that she harbors romantic feelings for him, which is proven true when they enter into a relationship. In the last episode, Stewart names her captain when he leaves the ship and the two end up serving as co-captains when he returns. Feig noted that while Karen is an overachiever, she is passed up in favor of her brother due to having "terrible people skills" in contrast to Stewart's "good people skills".
- Eugene Cordero as Michael Newman:
  The second officer of the Cruiser. He is Stewart's best friend, whom he babysat when they were children. Michael often feels ignored and disrespected by the rest of the crew, which is compounded by humiliations frequently inflicted on him throughout the series. Despite the neglect, he shares a mutual attraction with Karen, leading to a relationship between the two. After he loses his left leg during a mission, he utilizes a cybernetic implant for the remainder of the show. According to Feig, Michael is based on his own friend who had been his babysitter. Sean-Ryan Petersen portrays Michael as a child.
- Milana Vayntrub as Tina Shukshin:
  The navigator of the Cruiser. Tina is established as being unqualified for the position and was hired because of Stewart's unrequited love for her, although she is the only member of the crew capable of mining extractions. Flighty and possibly unstable, she has a tendency to resort to violence. Tina also cares about her friends and loved ones, however, as demonstrated when she sets up a date between Natasha and Kent. Vayntrub said she was drawn to the show because of her interest in science, being able to engage in improvisational comedy, and the opportunity to work with Feig.
- Neil Casey as Kent Woolworth:
  The science officer of the Cruiser. The son of UMP Chairwoman Helen Woolworth, Kent was born as an organ donor for his older brother Derek and has spent most of his life nearly-comatose in a chemical bath. Only recently freed from the chemical bath after Derek's death, Kent's upbringing has left him with difficulty understanding basic social conventions and expressing emotions. His anatomy was also altered by his upbringing, causing him to have gills on his neck and no fingerprints, among other unusual features. He gradually falls in love with Natasha and in the finale, transfers his mind into the ship to physically be with her. Feig originally envisioned the role for Martin Starr as a "really dysfunctional nerd whose father married a younger woman and the new wife wanted the kid out of the house", but the character was changed following development of the pilot episode and the casting of Casey.
- Conor Leslie as Natasha:
  The computer of the Cruiser. Natasha was created as a hospitality bot for the inaugural Hooters Casino Space Shuttle before she was purchased by UMP. She is upbeat and polite, but is also capable of expressing a wide variety of human emotions, including anger and sadness. Among her desires is free will and she is ultimately granted human privileges by Stewart and Karen, although she continues to loyally serve her superiors. During her time on the ship, she develops romantic feelings for Kent and the two enter into a relationship. Feig said that he was inspired by "the idea of the friendly operating system who’s still insecure, like all of us" when writing Natasha.
- Joel Hodgson as Zalian Fletcher:
  The longtime engineer of the Cruiser. Prolonged exposure to radiation has left him in a permanently-impaired state, but he remains capable at his job and demonstrates resourcefulness when the ship loses power, helping guide Stewart through the crisis. His best friend on board the Cruiser is A.R.T. Feig stated that he always envisioned Hodgson as Zalian, whose casting reunited him with his Mystery Science Theater 3000 co-star Beaulieu.
- Trace Beaulieu as the voice of A.R.T.:
  A robot stowaway residing on the Cruiser. Appearing as a wisecracking friend and companion of Zalian, A.R.T. is really billionaire inventor Howard Barnes, who transferred his brainwaves into a robotic body. Numerous models of A.R.T. are stored on the ship and if a model is destroyed, a new model containing the memories of the previous model replaces it. As with his Mystery Science Theater 3000 co-star Hodgson, Beaulieu was Feig's original choice for the character. Beaulieu and Sherry O'Connor serve as the puppeteers for A.R.T.

=== Guest ===
- Jessica Chaffin as General Hayson: A high-ranking UMP official
- Björn Gustafsson as Ted Zachariasen: A military officer and Tina's boyfriend
- Mo Collins as Helen Woolworth: The chairwoman of UMP and Kent's mother
- Sarah Baker as Alien: A mysterious extraterrestrial who comes into contact with the crew
- John Milhiser as the voice of Coffee Bot: A robot who provides coffee on the ship. Ian O'Connor serves as the puppeteer for Coffee Bot.
- Dave Franco as Chad Sampson: A manipulative alien posing as the auxiliary deck officer. Franco went uncredited for the role.

Edgar Blackmon, Kate Comer, and Evan Gaustad portray members of Stewart's crew during a training exercise.

== Episodes ==
No.	Title	Directed by	Written by	Original release date
1	"Into the Great Beyond...Beyond"	Luke Matheny	Paul Feig	April 14, 2015
Stewart is assigned captain of the UMP Cruiser with Karen as his second-in-command, to her displeasure. At the beginning of their first mission, the crew becomes stranded in another universe. Karen calls Stewart's leadership into question and stages a mutiny to become captain. UMP officials enter the ship, claiming the events that transpired were a test that Karen passed. Stewart, however, realizes that an unknown entity is manipulating the crew into seeing their deepest desires and saves them from the entity. Karen acknowledges that Stewart deserves to be captain and Stewart retains her as his second-in-command. The crew is joined by Chad, the auxiliary deck officer.
2	"Getting to Know You"	Lucia Aniello	Owen Ellickson	April 14, 2015
Suspicions arise that one of the crew members may be an alien. Kent is believed to be the intruder when the crew discovers gills on his neck, prompting them to place him in the ship's airlock. Karen realizes that the real alien is Chad, but Chad manipulates the crew into also throwing her and Stewart in the airlock. The three manage to escape and after Kent exposes Chad as being only capable of quoting Matthew McConaughey, Karen ejects him into space.
3	"The Death of A.R.T."	Lucia Aniello	Jacob Young	April 14, 2015
While A.R.T. is on the hull of the ship to fix a problem he caused, Karen accidentally knocks him into space. The crew learns that a planet is forming around the Cruiser, with A.R.T. in its orbit. A.R.T. sacrifices himself by attracting the planet's matter away from the ship to his body. Zalian reveals there are multiple models of A.R.T. on the ship, causing Karen to destroy another model out of frustration. Stewart creates a video message to introduce the Cruiser to any nearby aliens, but forgets to include Michael, fueling Michael's suspicions that he is not valued by the crew.
4	"Ted Talks"	Robert Cohen	Karen Kilgariff	April 14, 2015
Tina is assigned to retrieve the ship's fuel from near the surface of the new planet, but becomes too distraught to properly operate the machinery when she receives a delayed break-up message from Ted. Karen, Michael, and Natasha throw Tina a "girl's night" in an attempt to cheer her up. The event fails to raise her spirits, but the friendship shown inspires Tina to successfully retrieve the fuel. However, the ship is unable to start because Zalian and A.R.T. neglected to prime and test the thrusters. Karen and Michael enter into a relationship. The crew discovers that more wormholes are appearing in the universe, providing a potential means to return home, while the ship's cameras are taken over by an unknown user.
5	"Trouble's Brewing"	Adam Nix & Evan Nix	Ben Smith	April 14, 2015
Feeling unappreciated and disrespected, Natasha, Kent, and A.R.T. stage a "robot uprising" against Stewart and Karen. The uprising inadvertently turns violent when the malfunctioning-Coffee Bot holds the siblings at gunpoint, prompting Natasha, Kent, and A.R.T. to work together with Zalian to deactivate Coffee Bot. Afterwards, Kent and Natasha are granted human privileges and A.R.T. is given restrooms access. Meanwhile, Tina and Michael are sent to spend six hours retrieving fuel on the new planet, where time dilation causes hours to become months. They initially form a romantic relationship, but when their return to the Cruiser is delayed by the robot uprising, they succumb to insanity and Tina eats Michael's leg before they are beamed back. A mysterious alien watches the crew's video.
6	"Powerless"	Matt Sohn	Shelby Fero	April 14, 2015
The Cruiser is caught in an electric space storm that forces power on the ship to be kept to a minimum. Karen tricks Michael, Tina, and A.R.T. into believing the situation is worse than it actually is when they refuse to lower their power usage, but her plan results in Michael and Tina destroying A.R.T. and attempting to shut down Natasha to further conserve power. Kent protects Natasha from Michael and Tina, revealing that he has fallen in love with her. Stewart initially forgoes exiting the storm when he spots a potential sign of an alien ship, but the storm's intensity forces him to leave before he can find anything definitive. A new ripple is discovered that may return the crew to their universe, although Stewart becomes ambivalent about returning without exploring the new universe further.
7	"First Contact"	Matt Sohn	Matteo Borghese & Rob Turbovsky	April 14, 2015
After Karen strikes Michael over his affair with Tina, Tina holds a trial to decommission her. The trial ends without a verdict when Michael withdraws his complaint. Natasha is angered when Kent acknowledges that she will not matter to him when they return home, but the two make amends. They also learn that upon returning, Natasha's memory will be wiped. Stewart discovers that the alien is contacting him through his erotic dreams, resulting in the alien providing a frequency to allow it onboard the Cruiser.
8	"Finale"	Matt Sohn	Owen Ellickson	April 14, 2015
Tina attempts to set up a first date between Natasha and Kent before Natasha's memory is cleared. The date is unsuccessful, but Kent is able to transfer his mind into the ship and make physical contact with Natasha. After the alien visits the Cruiser, Stewart and Michael choose to go onboard its ship instead of returning home, where they discover that the alien is siphoning their fuel. The loss of fuel prevents the crew from traveling through the new wormhole, but they learn that the wormhole did not lead to Earth. The crew then discovers that they were being filmed as part of a reality television series, prompting them to behave in a monotone manner. The alien reveals her true appearance onboard the Cruiser and states that they are all being hunted by an unidentified presence.

== Release ==
The series premiered on April 14, 2015, through Yahoo! Screen, which released the eight episodes of the first season on the same day. The first season moved to DUST on August 1, 2020, with episodes also uploaded to its YouTube and Vimeo channels.

== Reception ==
The first season was met with positive reviews from critics upon its premiere. On Rotten Tomatoes it has an approval rating of 85%, based on reviews from 13 critics, with an average rating of 6.33 out of 10. The site consensus reads, "Other Space is a breezy trifle that revels in its low-fi production values and cheeky wonder in the pratfalls of space travel." On Metacritic, the first season has a score of 66 out of 100 based on 6 reviews, indicating "generally favorable reviews".

== Future ==
In April 2015, creator Paul Feig stated that the future of the show is "up in the air" and that a second season has yet to be ordered by the network. Feig confirmed that he was still waiting for a decision from Yahoo! in September 2015. On October 21, 2015, Yahoo CFO Ken Goldman announced during a Q3 Earnings Phone Call that their original programming lineup last spring resulted in a $42 million writeoff, including Community Season 6 and Sin City Saints.

On January 6, 2016, Feig suggested there may be more episodes of Other Space despite Yahoo! Screen cancelling their service in 2016 due to low viewership and financial writeoffs. On February 21, 2016, Paul Feig posted on his Twitter account: "Desist in losing hope. It will be back if I have to shoot it on my iPhone. But it won't come to that. Hang tough." after the future of the series was called into question when Yahoo! Screen was shut down in late 2015.

On January 31, 2017, it was reported that rights to the series had reverted from Yahoo! back to Paul Feig. Following his reclamation of the rights to the series, Feig released the entire show on Tumblr with the hope that it might garner enough attention to warrant a second season revival on another platform.

In 2020, it was announced the rights for the series were picked up by the streaming service DUST, which began hosting the series on August 1, 2020. As of October 2025, the series is not available on DUST's Tubi or YouTube channels.

== See also ==
- List of original programs distributed by Yahoo! Screen
