= Neil Casey =

American actor, writer, and comedian

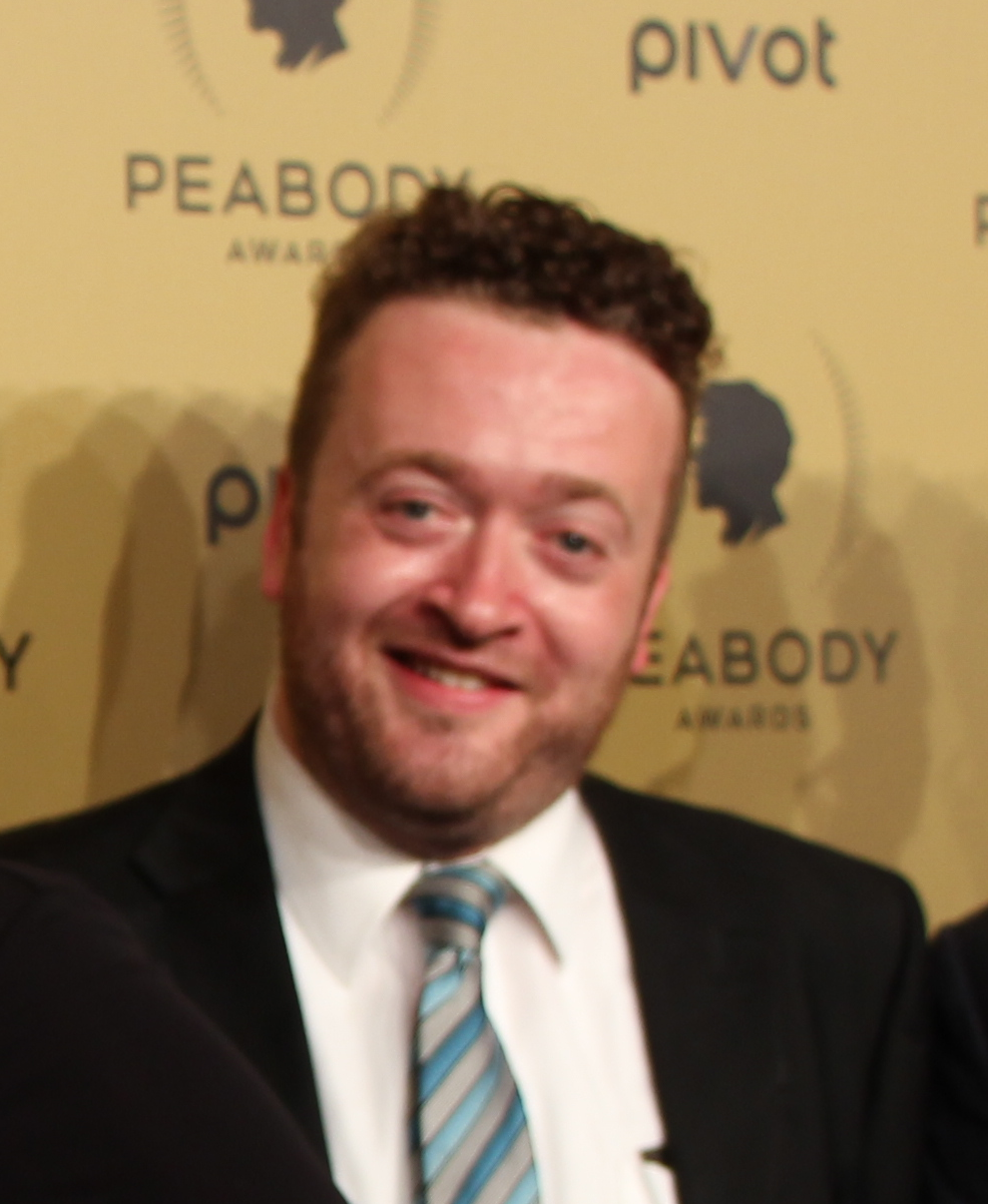
- Neil Casey at the 2015 Peabody Awards
- Born: July 28, 1981 (age 45); Wilmington, Delaware, US
- Education: University of Delaware (BA)
- Occupations: Actor, comedian, television writer, theatre director, playwright
- Years active: 2005–present
- Notable work: Saturday Night Live

Neil Casey (born July 28, 1981) is an American actor, writer, and comedian. Casey served as a writer for the NBC sketch comedy series Saturday Night Live from 2012 to 2013, and the Comedy Central series Inside Amy Schumer in 2014, receiving Primetime Emmy Award nominations for Outstanding Writing for a Variety Series for both shows. As an actor, he was a series regular on the comedies Other Space (2015) and Making History (2017). Casey also appeared in the 2016 reboot of Ghostbusters.

== Career ==
Casey graduated from the University of Delaware with a B.A. in English, including a concentration in drama and minoring in Theatre. He started his career in theatre in 2001 and worked at UCB Theatre, where he has also taught since 2007. He directed, wrote, and acted in several shows at the theatre.

=== Acting career ===
In 2015, Casey starred in the Yahoo! Screen series Other Space, created by Paul Feig.

In July 2015, Casey was cast in his first breakthrough film, Ghostbusters, the reboot of the 1984 film, playing a villain named Rowan North. The film reunited Casey with Other Space creator Feig and cast members Eugene Cordero, Bess Rous, Karan Soni, and Milana Vayntrub. It was released on July 15, 2016, by Sony Pictures Entertainment.

In 2017, Casey began co-starring opposite Adam Pally in the Fox time-travel comedy Making History; he played the role of Sam Adams.

=== Writing career ===
In 2012, Casey was hired to write comedy sketches for Saturday Night Live's season 38. He was nominated for a Primetime Emmy Award for Outstanding Writing for a Variety Series at the 65th show in 2013. He was also nominated for a Writers Guild of America Award in 2013 and 2015 in the category of Comedy/Variety (including talk) series.

In 2014, Casey was nominated for a Primetime Emmy Award for Outstanding Writing for a Variety Series at the 66th show for his work on Inside Amy Schumer. He was also nominated for a Writers Guild of America Award in 2014 in the category of Comedy/Variety (including talk) series.

In 2015, Casey wrote for the third season of Kroll Show.

In January 2023, Casey returned to Saturday Night Live as a guest writer for the episode hosted by Aubrey Plaza (season 48, episode 10, aired January 21, 2023). While flying to New York, he conceived the idea for the "Black Lotus" sketch, which he co-wrote with Bryan Tucker and Ego Nwodim; the parody trailer for a fictional HBO limited series reimagines The White Lotus with an all-Black resort staff (Kenan Thompson, Ego Nwodim, and Punkie Johnson) who quickly tire of the wealthy white guests' eccentricities.

Casey also contributed a topical joke to the NFL on Fox cold open in which Bowen Yang, appearing as Rep. George Santos impersonating his former drag persona Kitara Ravache, brags about his "gas-powered Jewish oven" and exclaims, "Now we’re cooking with gas… which I guess is bad now," referencing the contemporaneous political controversy over gas stoves.

== Filmography ==
=== Film ===
Year	Title	Role	Notes
2006	Cufflinks		Short
2007	What If There's Bears?		Short
2007	Oswald's Last Wish	Oswald	Short
2007	Ghostly Business	The Buyer	Short
2008	Secret Santa Buttplugs		Short
2009	Checkmates		Short
2009	Mystery Team	Broken Man	
2009	The Tetris God	Devotee	Short
2010	Mind Ride: Part 1		Short
2010	Mind Ride: Part 2		Short
2010	The Rest of Caesar	Stan	Short
2012	Baby Congress	(voice)	Short
2012	The Lost Takes: When Harry Met Sally		Short
2012	Gator Farm	Neil	Short
2013	Security Questions		Short
2014	Fort Tilden	Ebb	
2014	Limbos	Eugene	Short
2014	Adult Beginners	Neil	
2014	I'm Obsessed with You	Flamboyant Fan	
2016	Ghostbusters	Rowan North	
2018	A Futile and Stupid Gesture	Brian McConnachie	
2019	Greener Grass	Dennis	
2024	Micro Budget	Brett	

=== Television ===
Year	Title	Role	Notes
2005	My Wife, the Ghost	Glenn DeKamp	Short
2005	Cat News	Rob Thompson	Short
2006	Munchies	Bit	1 episode
2006	The Incredible Drunk	Mr. K	Short, 2 episodes
2007–2008	Fat Guy Stuck in Internet	Bit	16 episodes
2009	The Whitest Kids U' Know	Teacher	1 episode
2009	Pitchin' Nightmares		Short, 1 episode
2009	The Bartender		Short, 1 episode
2009	Late Night with Jimmy Fallon	Gary the Drunk Office Party Guy	1 episode
2011	Diamonds Wow!		Short, 1 episode
2011	CollegeHumor Originals	Blacksmith	1 episode
2009–2012	UCB Comedy Originals		4 episodes
2014	Broad City	Killian Casey	1 episode
2014	Playing House	Mr. Casey	1 episode
2014	Inside Amy Schumer	Cocktail Bartender / Mr. Peanut / Liam / Montgomery	4 episodes
2014–2015	The League	Neal/Neil	2 episode
2014	Marry Me	Fred	1 episode
2015	Kroll Show	Prosecutor / Hacktivist / Neil / Hellscape Head	5 episodes
2015	Other Space	Kent Woolworth	8 episodes
2015	Veep	Matty Curtis	1 episode
2015	The Untitled Web Series That Morgan Evans Is Doing for MTV	Frank	1 episode
2016–2018	Animals.	Various voices	8 episodes
2017	Making History	Sam Adams	7 episodes
2017	Superstore	Tim	1 episode
2017	The President Show	Mary Trump / Andrew Jackson	2 episodes
2017	Adam Ruins Everything	Director	Episode: "Adam Ruins Conspiracy Theories"
2017	Curb Your Enthusiasm	Golf Club Waiter	Episode: "Thank You for Your Service"
2017	Do You Want to See a Dead Body?	Dead Guy	Episode: "A Body and Some Pants (with Michaela Watkins)"
2017–2025	Big Mouth	Lars / various voices	18 episodes
2018	Santa Clarita Diet	Goran	1 episode
2018	Silicon Valley	Colin	3 episodes
2020	Star Trek: Lower Decks	Ensign Casey/additional voices	4 episodes
2020	Avenue 5	Cyrus	6 episodes
2022	A League of Their Own	John	1 episode
2023	Clone High	Topher Bus	
2023	White House Plumbers	Douglas Caddy	2 episodes
2024	Mr. Throwback	Gabrielle Leon	5 episodes
2026	Widow's Bay	Kurt	Recurring role
2026	Life, Larry and the Pursuit of Unhappiness	Dr. Harrington	Episode: "Lawrence"

=== As writer ===
Year	Title	Notes
2006	The Incredible Drunk	2 episodes
2006	Cufflinks	Short film
2008	Secret Santa Buttplugs	Short film
2012–2013, 2023	Saturday Night Live	19 episodes
2013	Security Questions	Short film
2014	Inside Amy Schumer	10 episodes
2015	Kroll Show	5 episodes
2017	Mystery Science Theater 3000: The Return	1 episode
2017	The President Show	2 episodes
2026	Widow's Bay	1 episode
