= Lobo (artist) =

Brazilian painter of Pop Art (born 1973)

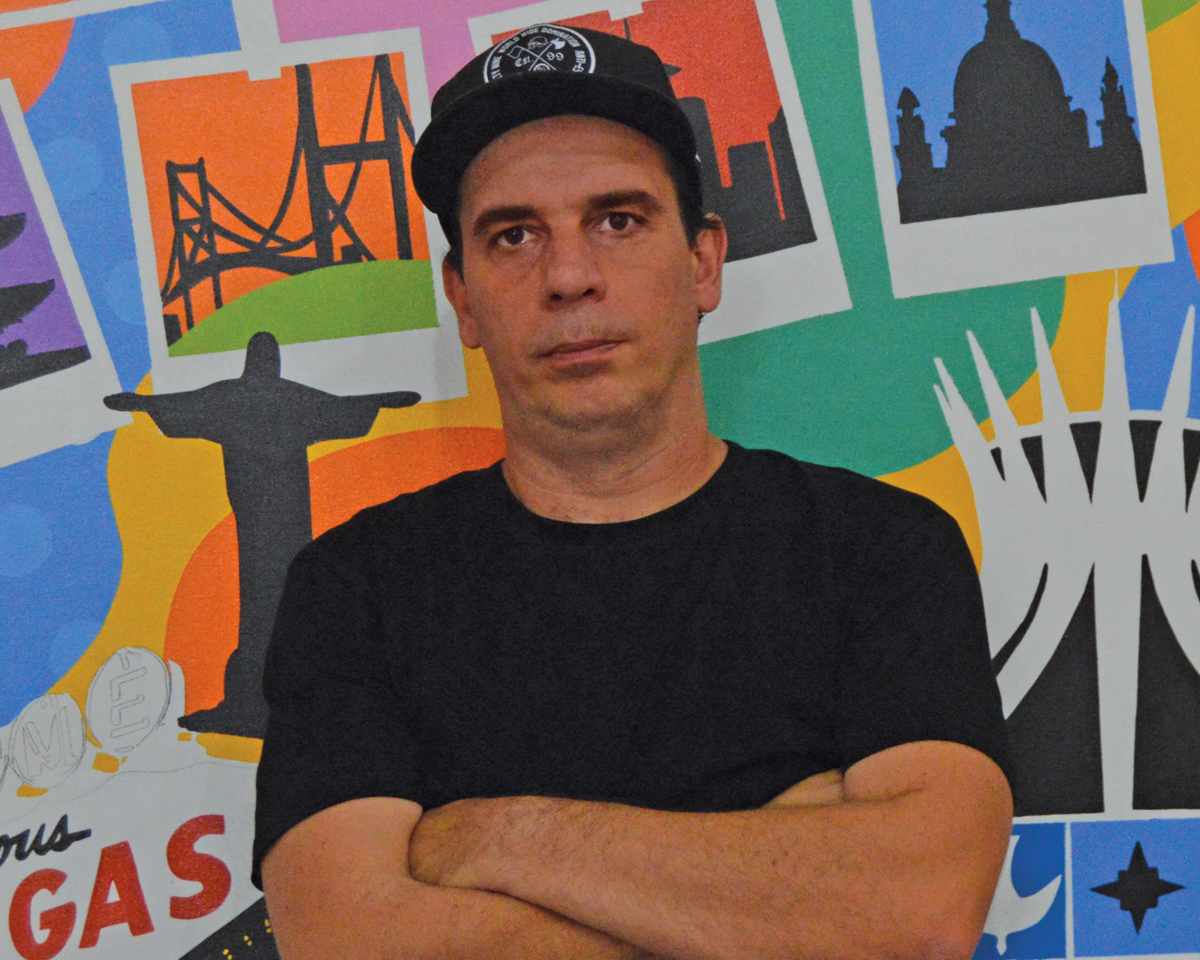
- Lobo in 2015
- Born: Marcio Batista; 19 November 1973 (age 52); São Paulo, Brazil
- Movement: Pop art
- Website: lobopopart.com

Signature
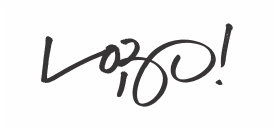

Marcio Batista (born 19 November 1973), known professionally as Lobo, is a Brazilian pop artist. He has produced artworks for public figures including Luciano Huck, Angélica, Sabrina Sato, and Michel Teló, among others.

Batista has also participated in projects in collaboration with companies such as Heineken, Mercado Livre, and Viva Schin.

== Early life ==
Lobo was born on 19 November 1973. He began his career in 1991 working at an advertising agency, where he was involved in packaging and labeling and merchandising. During his teenage years, he designed T-shirt artwork for several brands.

After twelve years working in advertising, Lobo began painting in 2003.

== Career ==
At the beginning of his career, the artist signed his work as Lobão; he later adopted Lobo as his professional name. His work initially focused on icons of popular culture, and his style evolved over time.

Lobo began painting in 2003 and held his first exhibition at the Piola restaurant in São Paulo.

In 2006, while still signing as Lobão, he accompanied the rock band Jota Quest on its Até Onde Vai tour, presenting an exhibition of works depicting music, video clips, and scenes associated with the band from Minas Gerais.

In 2008, the Brazilian edition of Rolling Stone marked its second anniversary with an event themed "Attitude that changes the world". Lobo was invited to create an exhibition portraying magazine covers and figures considered influential, including Ayrton Senna, Elvis Presley, Paulo Coelho, and Bob Marley.

In 2009, Lobo participated in an exhibition at Casa Cor São Paulo, contributing two canvases inspired by the work of Burle Marx.

In 2010, he created a mural for the Livraria Saraiva bookstore, highlighting Brazilian writer Clarice Lispector, poet Pablo Neruda, and writer Jorge Amado.

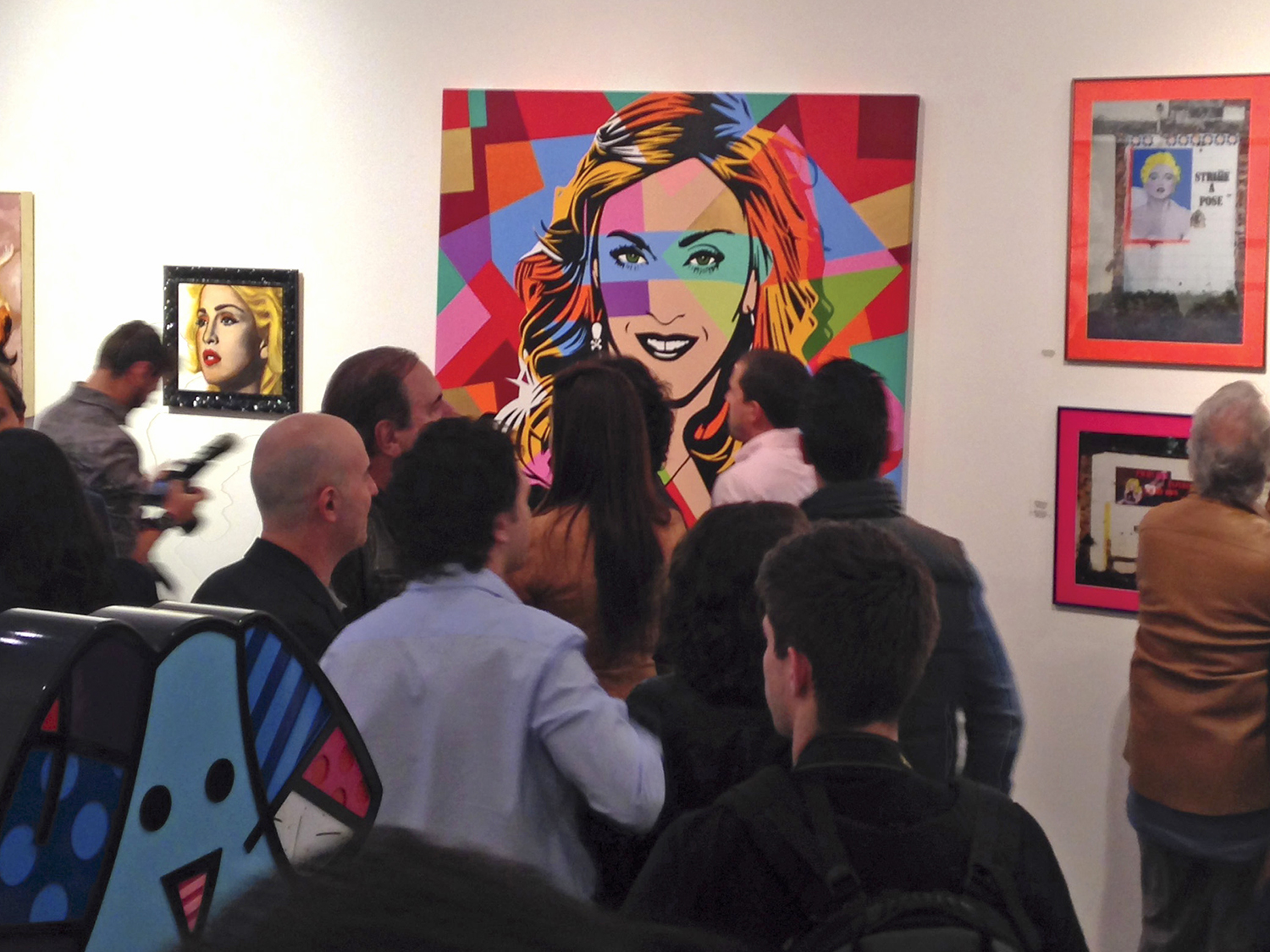
Exhibition in São Paulo

In 2011, Lobo was invited to participate in the Brazilian Festival in Amsterdam, the Netherlands. Held at the Mint Hotel, the exhibition "Sambadam" brought together cultural elements from Brazil and the Netherlands. Lobo portrayed figures from both cultures, including Pelé, Carmen Miranda, and Anne Frank, as well as the cocktail Caipirinha.

In 2013, he participated in the exhibition M – from Marilyn Monroe to Madonna, contributing two paintings.

That same year, Lobo was invited by Gillette to participate in the launch of razors honoring the Brazil national football team; the event was held in Miami.

Also in 2013, he was invited by cartoonist Mauricio de Sousa to participate in Monica Parade. Organized to commemorate the 50th anniversary of the character Monica (Monica and Friends), the urban art initiative featured 50 fiberglass sculptures installed across São Paulo.

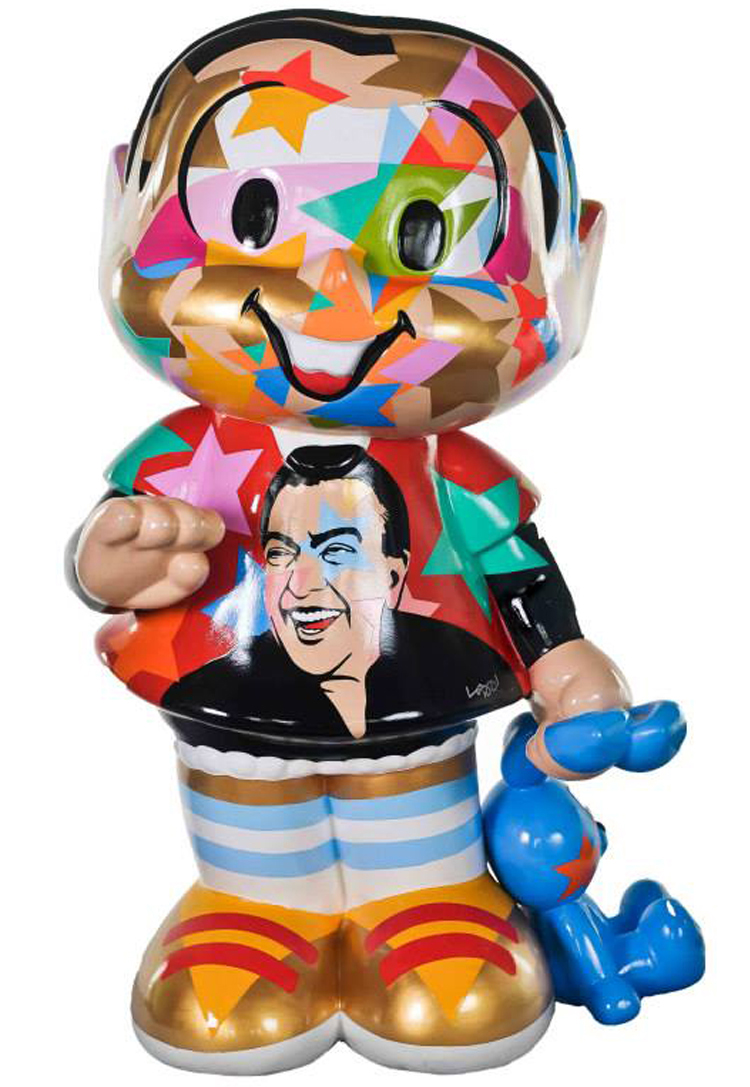
Artwork Monica by Pop Artist Lobo

The sculpture created by Lobo was stolen less than three hours after being installed on Rua Oscar Freire in the Jardim Paulista neighborhood. The incident received widespread media coverage. After being recovered in Guarulhos following an anonymous tip, the sculpture underwent minor restoration and was reinstalled on Paulista Avenue, in front of the Conjunto Nacional (São Paulo).

In 2014, Lobo was invited by Grupo RBS to paint live during the Marketing Network Brasil event, held at the Hotel Transamérica in Ilha de Comandatuba.

In 2015, Heineken invited Lobo to illustrate key milestones marking the company's five-year presence in Brazil. A three-metre-wide artwork produced for the occasion is displayed at Heineken's headquarters in São Paulo.

Also in 2015, Lobo participated in "Reciclalata", a travelling exhibition celebrating the 25th anniversary of the aluminum can in Brazil.

In 2016, Viva Schin, a Brasil Kirin soft drink brand owned by Heineken, launched a line of collectible packaging inspired by the career of television presenter Xuxa. Eight "Viva Xuxa" cans were designed by Lobo.

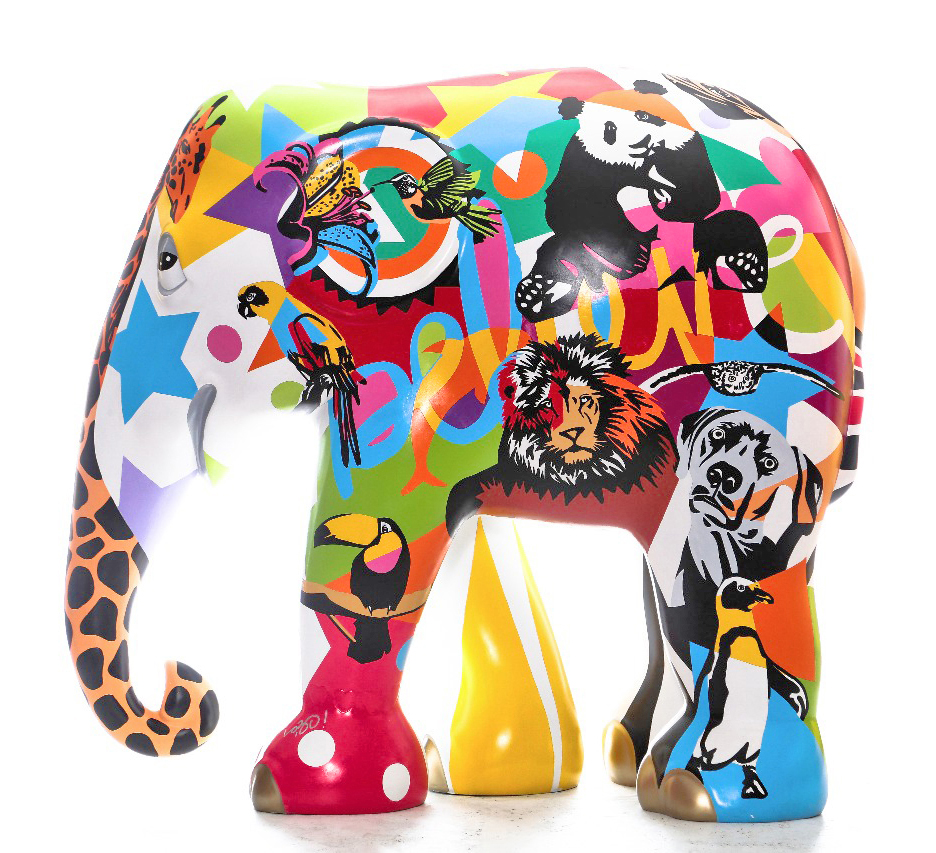
Elephant Parade by Pop Artist Lobo

In 2017, during the 10th edition of CowParade Brazil, Lobo painted a sculpture inspired by the theme "A trip around the world", paying tribute to the city of Las Vegas.

That same year, Yázigi, an official sponsor of the Elephant Parade in São Paulo, invited Lobo to paint two elephant sculptures.

In 2018, the American television network Fox invited Lobo to contribute artwork to the set of the television series LA to Vegas.

Later in 2018, Mercado Livre invited Lobo to paint murals at its new headquarters in Florianópolis. The main mural, measuring 13 metres, features iconography representing Brazilian cities and other Latin American countries where the company operates.

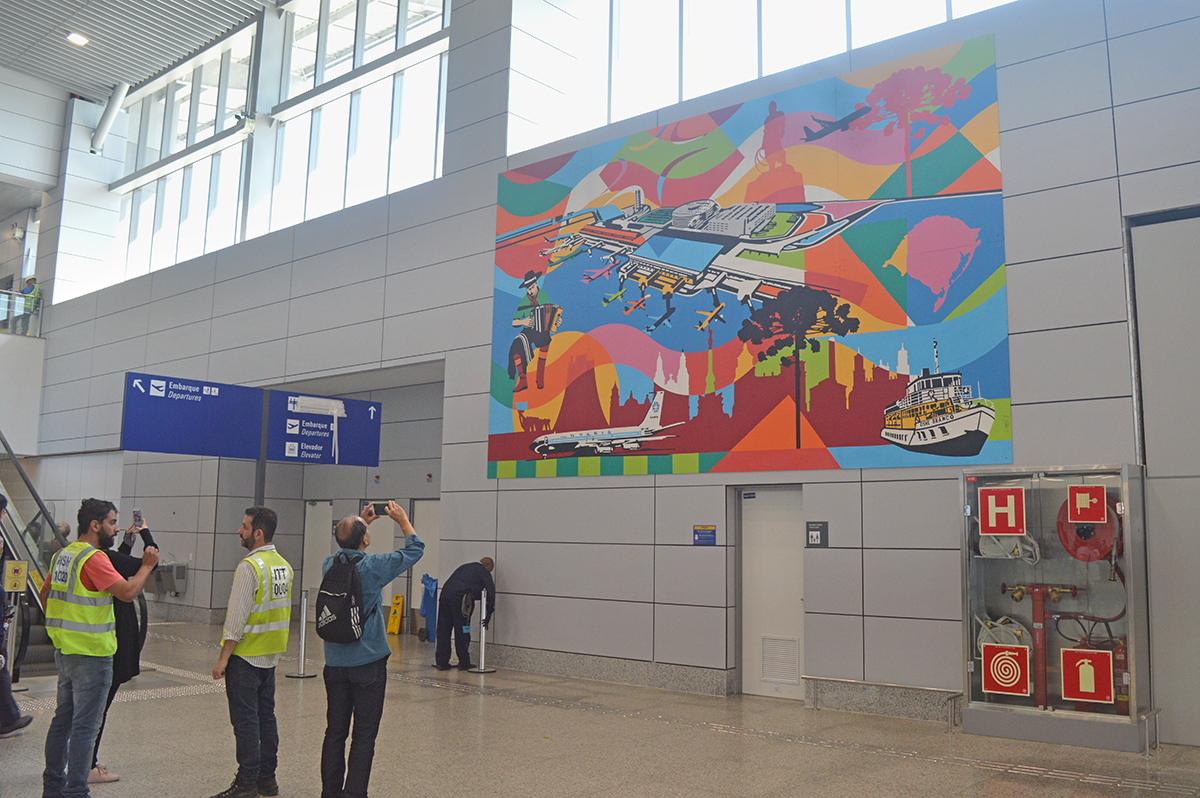
Artworks at Porto Alegre International Airport

In 2019, Fraport, the German company responsible for managing Porto Alegre's Salgado Filho International Airport, commissioned Lobo to create seven murals depicting gaucho culture. The first phase of the airport's redevelopment was delivered in 2019.

Also in 2019, Lobo was invited by Mercado Livre to paint murals at its new distribution center in Cajamar. In July 2020, Mercado Livre became the most valuable company in Latin America.

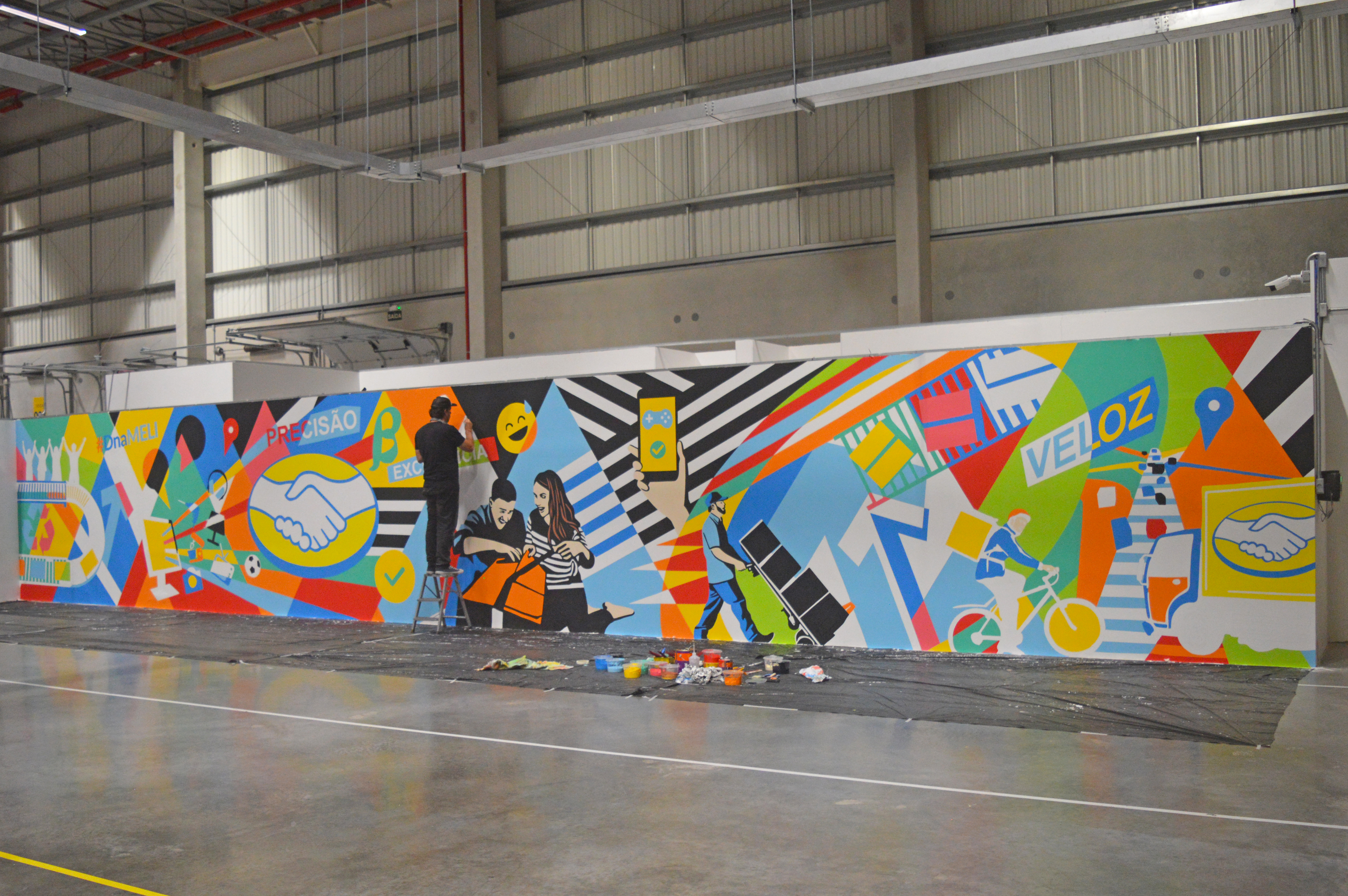
Pop artist Lobo painting a mural for Mercado Libre

== Influences ==
Early in his career, Lobo was influenced by artists such as Keith Haring and Andy Warhol.

He later developed a distinct visual style. The diversity of the culture of Brazil and Brazilian art, as well as music of the 1980s, have been cited as influences on his work.

== Gallery ==
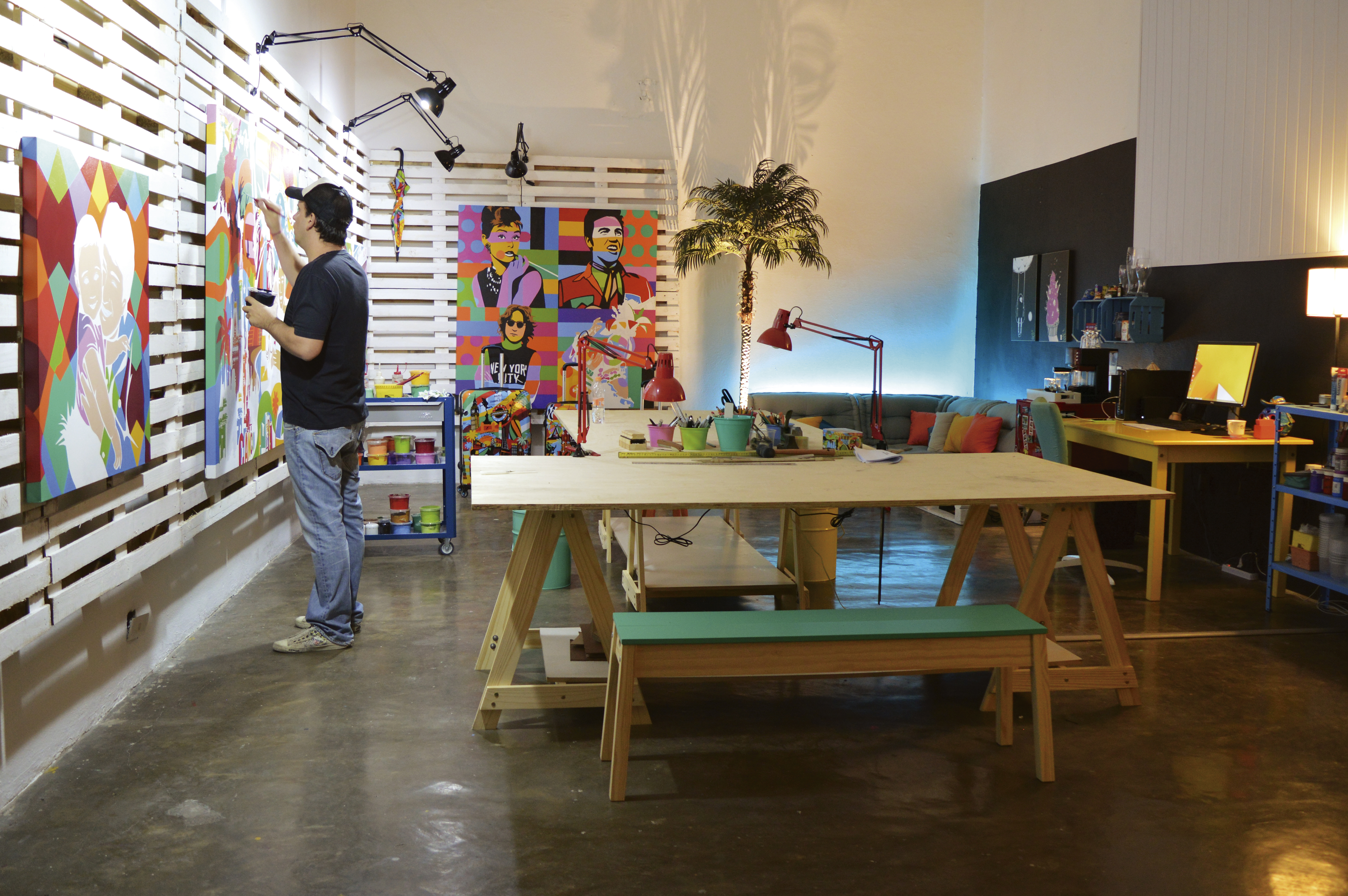
Lobo in the studio

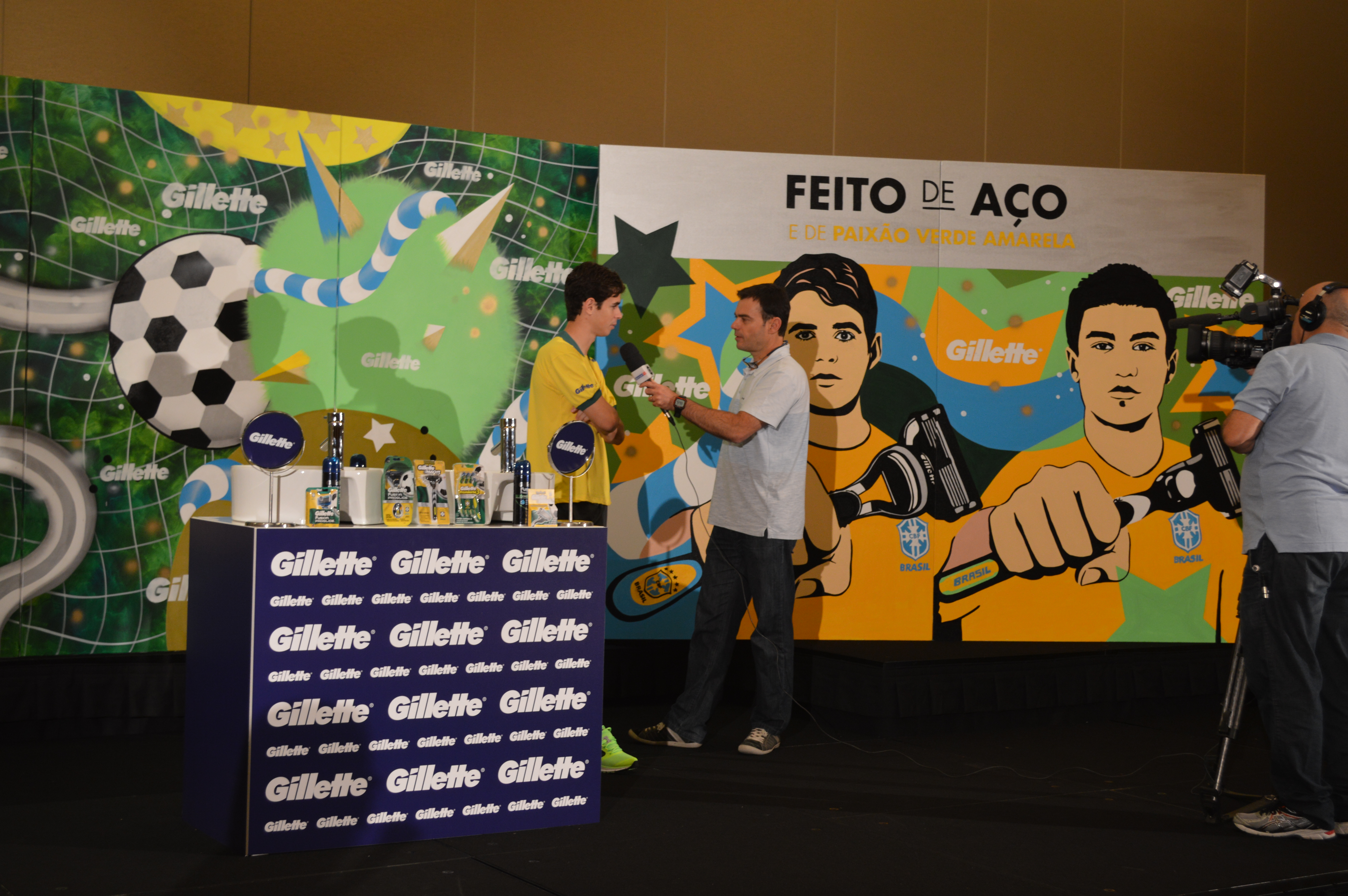
Lobo for Gillette Campaign

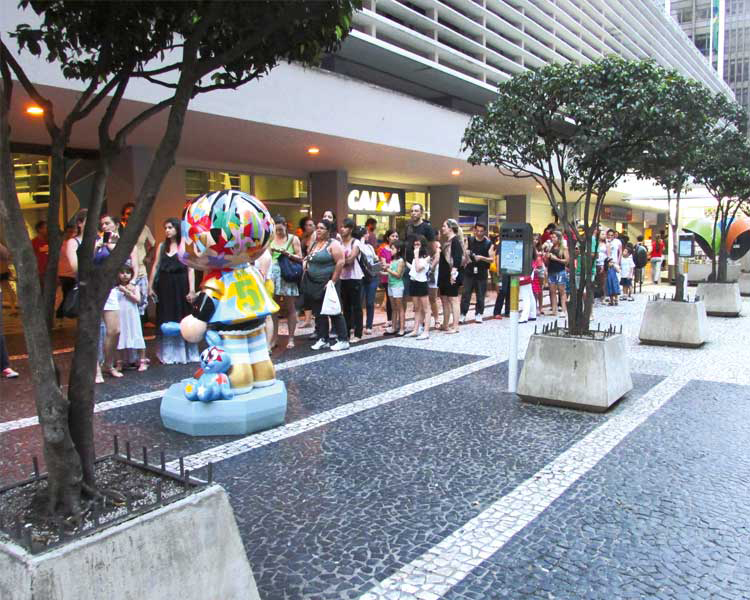
Statue of Lobo
