= Dirty (2020 film) =

2020 short film by Matthew Puccini

- Poster
- Directed by: Matthew Puccini
- Written by: Matthew Puccini
- Produced by: Cecilia Delgado; Matthew Puccini; Jeremy Truong
- Starring: Morgan Sullivan; Manny Dunn
- Cinematography: Matt Mitchell
- Edited by: William Sullivan
- Music by: Nathan Prillaman
- Production companies: Jacob Burns Film Center; Bering Pictures; 141 Entertainment
- Distributed by: The Criterion Channel
- Release dates: January 24, 2020 (Sundance Film Festival); April 2, 2020 (SXSW)
- Running time: 11 minutes
- Country: United States
- Language: English

Dirty is a 2020 short LGBT coming-of-age romantic drama film, written and directed by Matthew Puccini. It premiered at the 2020 Sundance Film Festival, where it was nominated for the Grand Jury Prize for Best Short Film.

The film made its online premiere through a virtual screening by SXSW, as the festival was cancelled as a result of the COVID-19 pandemic. Nevertheless, the festival still awarded the film with a Special Jury Award for the performances of its lead actors, Morgan Sullivan and Manny Dunn. It then went on to play at BFI Flare, Outfest Fusion, Atlanta Film Festival and the Palm Springs International ShortFest; at the latter it was nominated for Best LGBTQ+ Short. In October 2020, the film's streaming rights were acquired by The Criterion Channel.

== Premise ==
Marco cuts class to spend the afternoon with his boyfriend, Graham. Things do not go as planned.

According to Puccini, this film and his previous short, Lavender (2019), are personal to him, saying: "I’m grateful for both films for different reasons and they are all part of one period of my life — exploring these ideas of intimacy and loneliness and queer people seeking connection. In some ways they’re almost two attempts to answer the same question."

== Cast ==
- Morgan Sullivan as Marco
- Manny Dunn as Graham
- Sean Patrick Higgins as Mr. Flanangan

Ethan River Cohen, Chelsea Eason, Cherish Hearts, Ryan Knight, Octavia Kohner, Maurice Nelson, Zac Porter, Olivia Sulkowicz, Melissa Topnas, Arianna Wellmoney and Jude Young appear as students during the opening scenes.

== Accolades ==
=== Film festival awards ===
Year	Award	Film Festival	Recipient	Result
2020	Short Film Grand Jury Prize	Sundance Film Festival	Dirty	Nominated
2020	Grand Jury Award - Narrative Short	SXSW Film Festival	Dirty	Nominated
2020	Special Jury Recognition for Acting	SXSW Film Festival	Morgan Sullivan; Manny Dunn	Won
2020	Best LGBTQ+ Short	Palm Springs International ShortFest	Dirty	Nominated
2020	Fiction Shorts Competition	Montclair Film Festival	Dirty	Nominated
