= Matthew Puccini =

American filmmaker (born c. 1992/1993)

- Born: 1992 or 1993 (age 33–34); San Francisco, California, U.S.
- Education: New York University (BFA)
- Occupations: Director, Producer, Writer, Editor
- Years active: 2010–present
- Notable work: Lavender (2019); Dirty (2020)
- Website: http://www.matthewpuccini.com

Matthew Puccini (born c. 1992/1993) is an American filmmaker. He is known for his short films that deal with LGBT-related subject matters. These include The Mess He Made (2017), Marquise (2018), Dirty (2020) and Lavender (2019). His films have played at several festivals including Sundance, SXSW, Aspen Shortsfest, Palm Springs ShortsFest, and Outfest Los Angeles. His work has also been featured on Topic and The Huffington Post.

== Life and career ==
Puccini grew up in the San Francisco Bay Area. In 2015, while attending New York University's Tisch School of the Arts, he made his first film as writer and director, Solo, which starred Tommy Nelson and Matthew Mindler. It earned Puccini the King Award for Screenwriting at NYU's First Run Film Festival and won the 2017 Golden Reel Award for Best Student Film at the Tiburon International Film Festival.

After graduating from NYU in 2017, Puccini made his next film, The Mess He Made, which showed the experience of waiting for the results of an HIV test through the eyes of a man, played by Max Jenkins. The film premiered at SXSW in 2017, where it became a finalist for the Iris Prize. That same year, Puccini became a member of the 2017 New York Film Festival Artist Academy, a Richie Jackson Fellow at Tisch School of the Arts and a Creative Culture Fellow at the Jacob Burns Film Center. He then produced two more short films, Stumped and Marquise, the latter of which was acquired for streaming by Topic Studios.

In 2018, Puccini was named a Sundance Ignite Fellow. He created a Kickstarter campaign to fund Lavender, which he then produced later that year, starring Michael Hsu Rosen, Ken Barnett and Michael Urie. The film premiered at the 2019 Sundance Film Festival and was nominated for both the festival's Short Film Grand Jury Prize and Vimeo’s Best Drama of 2019, and won the Here Media Award for Best Queer Short Film at the Provincetown International Film Festival. Its distribution rights were acquired by Fox Searchlight Pictures after its Sundance premiere.

In 2020, his next film, Dirty premiered at the 2020 Sundance Film Festival and was nominated for the Jury Award for Best Short Film. The film was screened virtually at SXSW due to the COVID-19 pandemic, where it was nominated for the Grand Jury Award for Narrative Short and received a Special Jury Award for Acting. It then went on to play at BFI Flare, Outfest Fusion, Atlanta Film Festival and the Palm Springs ShortsFest. In October 2020, the film's streaming rights were acquired by The Criterion Channel.

In 2024, Puccini and Lavender co-producer Casey Bader participated in the Creators Market at that year's Tribeca Festival to pitch what they hope will be Puccini's feature directorial debut.

== Filmography ==
Year	Title	Role	Notes
2013	A Fiberglass Affair	Editor	Narrative short
2014	Do Us Part	Editor	Narrative short
2014	Anchovies	Editor	Narrative short
2015	Backyard Portal	Editor	Narrative short
2015	Solo	Director, writer	Narrative short
2016	Where People Hide Away	Editor	Narrative short
2016	Burning Child	Editor	Narrative short
2017	The Mess He Made	Director, producer, writer	Narrative short
2017	Stumped	Director, writer, editor	Narrative short
2018	Marquise	Director, writer, editor	Documentary short
2019	Lavender	Director, writer	Narrative short
2020	Dirty	Director, producer, writer	Narrative short
2021	Queer/Elder	Director	Documentary short
2022	Starfuckers	Executive producer	Narrative short

== Awards and nominations ==
=== Film festival awards ===
Year	Festival	Film	Award	Result	Notes
2016	NYU First Run Film Festival	Solo	King Award for Screenwriting	Won	
2017	Tiburon International Film Festival	Solo	Golden Reel Award for Best Student Film	Won	
2017	SXSW Film Festival	The Mess He Made	Grand Jury Award for Narrative Short	Nominated	
2017	Sarasota Film Festival	The Mess He Made	Grand Jury Prize - Narrative Short Competition	Nominated	
2019	Sundance Film Festival	Lavender	Grand Jury Prize - Short Film	Nominated	
2019	Sarasota Film Festival	Lavender	Grand Jury Prize - Narrative Short Competition	Nominated	
2019	SXSW Film Festival	Lavender	Grand Jury Award for Narrative Short	Nominated	
2019	Provincetown International Film Festival	Lavender	Here Media Award - Best Queer Short Film	Won	
2020	Sundance Film Festival	Dirty	Grand Jury Prize - Short Film	Nominated	
2020	SXSW Film Festival	Dirty	Grand Jury Award for Narrative Short	Nominated	
2020	Palm Springs International ShortFest	Dirty	Best LGBTQ+ Short	Nominated	
2020	Montclair Film Festival	Dirty	Fiction Shorts Competition	Nominated	
