= Lavender (2019 film) =

2019 short film by Matthew Puccini

- Film poster
- Directed by: Matthew Puccini
- Screenplay by: Matthew Puccini
- Produced by: Casey Bader; Corey Deckler; Tyler Rabinowitz
- Starring: Michael Urie; Michael Hsu Rosen; Ken Barnett
- Cinematography: Brandon Roots
- Edited by: William Sullivan
- Production company: Jacob Burns Film Center
- Distributed by: Fox Searchlight Pictures
- Release date: January 25, 2019 (Sundance)
- Running time: 11 minutes
- Country: United States
- Language: English

Lavender is a 2019 short LGBT romantic drama film, written and directed by Matthew Puccini. It premiered at the 2019 Sundance Film Festival, where it was then acquired by Fox Searchlight Pictures for an Academy Award-qualifying theatrical run, attaching it to select screenings of The Aftermath.

The film then went on to play at the 2019 SXSW Festival, Palm Springs International ShortFest, Outfest Los Angeles, New Orleans Film Festival, NFFTY and the Provincetown International Film Festival, where it won the Here Media Award for Best Queer Short Film.

== Premise ==
What started off as a casual hookup has quickly escalated into something far more intimate, leaving Andy to navigate Arthur and Lucas' dreamy lifestyle and marriage.

== Cast ==
- Michael Urie as Arthur
- Michael Hsu Rosen as Andy
- Ken Barnett as Lucas
- Christopher Schaap as Boyfriend

== Accolades ==
Year	Award	Film Festival	Recipient	Result
2020	Short Film Grand Jury Prize	Sundance Film Festival	Lavender	Nominated
2020	Grand Jury Award - Narrative Short	SXSW Film Festival	Lavender	Nominated
2020	Grand Jury Prize - Narrative Short Competition	Sarasota Film Festival	Lavender	Nominated
2020	Here Media Award - Best Queer Short Film	Provincetown International Film Festival	Lavender	Won
