= Olivia Macklin =

American actress

- Born: March 16, 1994 (age 32)
- Occupation: Actress
- Years active: 2016–present

Olivia Macklin is an American actress. She is best known for playing Nichole in the sitcom LA to Vegas and Claire in the sitcom Pretty Smart.

== Education ==
Macklin attended elementary school in New Trier, Winnetka. She is a graduate of Fordham University.

== Career ==
Macklin made her on-screen debut in an episode of the sitcom Sex & Drugs & Rock & Roll. Her first big role came playing Madre in the drama series The Young Pope. She played Nichole, one of the lead characters in the sitcom LA to Vegas. She played Becky Monreaux, one of the lead characters in the comedy drama series Filthy Rich. Her biggest role so far has been playing Clare in the sitcom Pretty Smart starring Emily Osment and Gregg Sulkin.

== Filmography ==
=== Film ===
Year	Title	Role	Notes
2018	Radium Girls	Paula	
2024	A Family Affair	Ashley	
2025	The Other	Robin	
2025	Being Dead Should Be Easy	Janie Spellman	Short

=== Television ===
Year	Title	Role	Notes
2016	Sex & Drugs & Rock & Roll	Emma	Episode: "Ghosts of Skibbereen"
2016	The Young Pope	Madre	7 episodes
2018	LA to Vegas	Nichole	15 episodes
2019	Dead to Me	Bambi	Episode: "I Can't Go Back"
2020	Filthy Rich	Becky Monreaux	10 episodes
2021	Pretty Smart	Claire	10 episodes
2022	Christmas Always Finds Its Way	Linda	Episode: "Christmas Bites"
2026	Crystal Lake	Trish	Episode: "Friday..."
