= Cinthya Carmona =

Venezuelan actress

- Born: December 7, 1990 (age 35); Caracas, Venezuela
- Occupation: Actress
- Years active: 2009–present

Cinthya Carmona is a Venezuelan actress. She is best known for playing Sophie Cardona in the teen drama series Greenhouse Academy and Solana in the sitcom Pretty Smart.

== Early life ==
Carmona was born in Caracas, Venezuela. She moved to Florida with her parents at a very young age. She credits the shows The Fresh Prince of Bel-Air, Full House and George Lopez for teaching her how to speak English. Carmona grew up as a member of the Jehovah's Witnesses. She was involved in many school dance projects but she always knew acting was her future. Her godmother was a talent agent and a manager for telenova talent in Miami. She snuck into an acting workshop at the age of 17 and fell in love with it. She moved to Los Angeles two years later.

== Career ==
She played Brandie in a recurring role in the teen drama series East Los High. She starred alongside Shia LaBeouf and Bobby Soto in the crime film The Tax Collector Her biggest role so far has been playing Sophie Cardona in the teen drama series Greenhouse Academy. She portrayed Offir in the Indie film Reefa. She portrayed one of the lead characters, Solana in the sticom Pretty Smart. In May 2026 it was revealed she would be joining a new HBO series called American Blue.

== Filmography ==
=== Film ===
Year	Title	Role	Notes
2012	Super 35	Sloane Peterson	Short
2012	Success Driven	The Fan	Short
2013	Ambushed	Ashley	
2015	Badge of Honor	Angela Flores	
2015	Randy Doe	Bar Patron	Short
2015	Private Space	Rebecca	Short
2019	Skin in the Game	Crystal	
2020	A Dark Foe	Maria	
2020	The Tax Collector	Alexis	
2020	Painter	Lupe	
2021	Reefa	Offir	
2022	Repeater	Sara	
2024	Jenni	Chiquis Rivera	
2025	Bernie the Dinosaur	Production Assistant	Short
2026	The Dishwasher	Silvia	Short
2026	La Maquina	Brenda	
2026	Prey by Night	Blythe Redding	

=== Television ===
Year	Title	Role	Notes
2009	El Vacilon	Girl	
2012	True Justice	Lupe	2 episodes
2015	Power	Female Attendant	Episode; Three Moves Ahead
2016	Rush Hour	Dakota	Episode; Welcome Back, Carter
2016-2017	East Los High	Brandie	13 episodes
2019	The Fix	Imelda	Episode; Pilot
2017-2020	Greenhouse Academy	Sophie Cardona	40 episodes
2020	Deputy	Nurse Julie	3 episodes
2021	FBI	Valentina	Episode; Crazy Love
2021	Pretty Smart	Solana	10 episodes
2024	Station 19	Beatriz	Episode; Ushers of the New World
2026	American Blue	Jenny	In Production
