= Marcio Kogan =

Brazilian architect and filmmaker (born 1952)

- Born: March 6, 1952; São Paulo, Brazil
- Education: Mackenzie Presbyterian University
- Occupation: Architect
- Awards: Prix Versailles 2019; LEAF Award (2009, 2011, 2013, 2014, 2015, 2017, 2018)
- Practice: Studio MK27
- Buildings: Gama-Issa House; Jungle House; Planar House

Marcio Kogan (born March 6, 1952, São Paulo) is a Brazilian architect and filmmaker best known for his work on private homes and retail design. The son of engineer Aron Kogan (1924–1961), a designer and contractor of several major skyscrapers of 1950s–1960s São Paulo such as Edificio São Vito and Edificio Mirante do Vale, he graduated from the Mackenzie Presbyterian University School of Architecture and Urbanism in 1976. Kogan's early career was split between cinema and architecture, usually in partnership with former Mackenzie classmate Isay Weinfeld. In 1988, the duo produced the feature film Fire and Passion, and, between 1995 and 2004, did 5 exhibitions together about architecture and humor.

In 2001, Kogan's practice changed its name to Studio MK27 and has since gained greater international projection, with projects in Peru, Uruguay, Chile, the United States, Canada, Spain, Portugal, Switzerland, India, Israel, and Indonesia. Its portfolio also includes interiors, product design, and furniture design. In 2012, Studio MK27 was selected to represent Brazil at the Venice Biennale of Architecture, exhibiting at the national pavilion curated by Lauro Cavalcanti, alongside an installation by Lúcio Costa.

Kogan's projects are characterized by their high level of detail, formal simplicity, strong relations between inside and outside, focus on thermal comfort through passive sustainability, use of pure volumes, and the application of traditional elements such as mashrabiyas, as well as by functional internal plans. He favors the use of raw materials such as wood, concrete, and stone. Nearly all of his designs include references to Brazilian modern architecture, of which Kogan has long declared himself a great fan.

In 2011, Kogan was named an Honorary Member of the American Institute of Architects (AIA). In 2013, New York Times critic Paul Goldberger cited Kogan as one of the main references of Brazilian contemporary architecture.

Kogan is a faculty member at Escola da Cidade and the Polytechnic University of Milan. His son, Gabriel Kogan, is also an architect and architecture critic.

== Career ==
=== Early work ===
During the first years of his career, the architectural projects were divided with Kogan's dedication to film-making. Between 1973 and 1979 he produced – together with Isay Weinfeld – 13 short films in Super 8, winning numerous awards in national festivals. In 1983, the two made another short film, now in 35mm, “Idos com o Vento”, which received a prize at the Gramado Festival and at the Ibero-American Cine Huelva in Spain. Five years later, they launched their first and only long-feature, Fire and Passion (1988), with a star-filled cast that included Mira Haar, Cristina Mutarelli, Carlos Moreno, Rita Lee and Fernanda Montenegro. All of their film productions had a strong relation with humor, above all through visual jokes, expressed by the interaction of the characters and the scenario.

In Architecture, the principal projects of the onset of his career were the buildings of his office in 1977 (located in São Paulo) – where he still maintains his activities – and Edificio Ljis (a 12-floor Residential building), finished in 1980. Other than there solo projects, he also did with Weinfeld the Goldfarb House in 1989, which brought references of Vila Arpel From the film My Uncle by Jacques Tati.

=== 1990s ===
During the 1990s, Kogan and Weinfeld designed the Metropolis Building (a residential tower in Morumbi), finished in 1996, and the Hotel Fasano, one of the most important luxury hotels in São Paulo, and headed by a traditional family of restaurateurs of the city. Construction of Fasano started in 1996 and was completed in 2003. The partnership in film-making opened for exhibits about architecture and humor.

Among the individual architectural projects developed in the 1990s, the outstanding ones are the Larmod Store and the Uma Store in Vila Madalena. The projects explored the internal spatiality with large ceiling-heights and minimized the use of materials and colors, almost always done in white mortar.

=== 2000s ===
In 2001, Marcio Kogan's office became more collaborative and also received a new name, Studio MK27. The work system adopted gave greater freedom as well as responsibility to the architects, who have also now become co-authors of the projects, signing together with Kogan. In this organization, the task division was minimized and each architect accompanied all of the phases of the project, from the briefing with the client until the project delivery.

Already in this phase, the Gama Issa House (2002) was greatly published in international magazines. Highlights from these first years of Studio MK27 also include Coser Photographic Studio – built within an industrial warehouse in the Cambuci neighborhood of São Paulo – and the Microbiology Museum at the Butantan Institute in São Paulo – a retrofit of an older structure, transformed into a center for didactic activities.

During the first decade of the 20th century, two of Studio MK27 houses won the Record House Award, promoted by the prestigious North-American magazine Architectural Record: the Du Plessis Home (2004), which does a re-reading of the traditional elements of Brazilian architecture, such as veranda, the mashrabiyas and the patio, and shortly thereafter BR House (2005). For Micasa VolB, Studio MK27 returns with humor in architecture, this time in a commentary in Brazilian modernism. The project of this furniture store-showroom was largely defined in discussion on the work-site. The traditional exposed concrete was done randomly, and building elements such as steel reinforcing bars were used as brises-soleil.

Paraty House, concluded in 2009, received great attention from the specialized media, winning 10 international awards, including the Wallpaper* Design Award promoted to by the British magazine.

=== 2010s ===
This period is marked by the internationalization of Kogan's production and the diversification of the architectural programs. The ongoing projects include hotels in Portugal and Indonesia, and projects being concluded in Chile and Uruguay.

In 2011, Kogan was selected to be an Honorary Member of the American Institute of Architects (AIA), also given to another Brazilian, Angelo Bucci, that same year. For the Venice Biennale of Architecture in 2012, Studio MK27 produced a video installation representing fictional in the V4 House. The Brazilian Pavilion was greatly praised by the international media including the British paper “The Guardian” with the critic Steve Rose classifying the installation as the “highlight of the Biennale” and “great fun”.

Furthermore, Studio MK27, during these last few years, began designing furniture, including fixtures, taps and a bathtub. Among the main international awards received recently, highlights include: Leaf Awards with the Punta Casa (2011) and the M&M House (2013), the Record House with Bahia House (2011) and the World Architecture Festival (WAF) with the Decameron Store (2011), Record Interiors with Studio SC (2012) and the International Design Award with the Redux House (2014). Studio R was selected in 2014 as a finalist in the Mies Crown Hall Americas Prize as one of the 36 projects built in America between 2000 and 2013.

In 2014, Moleskine launched a supplement about Studio MK27 showing the quotidian in the office, sketches and their main inspirations. The book will be a part of the series “Inspiration and Process in Architecture”.

== Studio MK27 ==
The office is comprised, besides Marcio Kogan, by Beatriz Meyer, Carlos Costa, Carolina Castroviejo, Constanza Cortes, Diana Radomysler, Eduardo Chalabi, Eduardo Glycerio, Elisa Friedman, Eline Ostyn, Gabriel Kogan, Giovanni Meirelles, Lair Reis, Laura Guedes, Luciana Antunes, Márcio Tanaka, Maria Cristina Motta, Mariana Ruzante, Mariana Simas, Oswaldo Pessano, Pedro Ribeiro, Renata Furlanetto, Samanta Cafardo and Suzana Glokowski.

Since 2001 Studio MK27 has won more than 200 Brazilian and international awards, as IAB-BR, WAF, Architectural Review, Dédalo Minosse, Record House, LEAF, D&AD, Sparks, Barbara Capochin, Icônico, AZ and Wallpaper Design Award.

== Major projects ==
=== Buildings ===
- Edificio Ijis (1980) São Paulo
- Edificio Metropolis (1996) with Isay Weinfeld São Paulo
- Museum of Microbiology at Butantan Institute (2002), co-authored by Bruno Gomes, São Paulo
- Primetime Nursery (2007) co-authored by Lair Reis, São Paulo
- Studio SC (2010), co-authored by Suzana Glokowski, São Paulo
- Studio R (2012), co-authored by Gabriel Kogan, São Paulo

=== Retail and hospitality ===
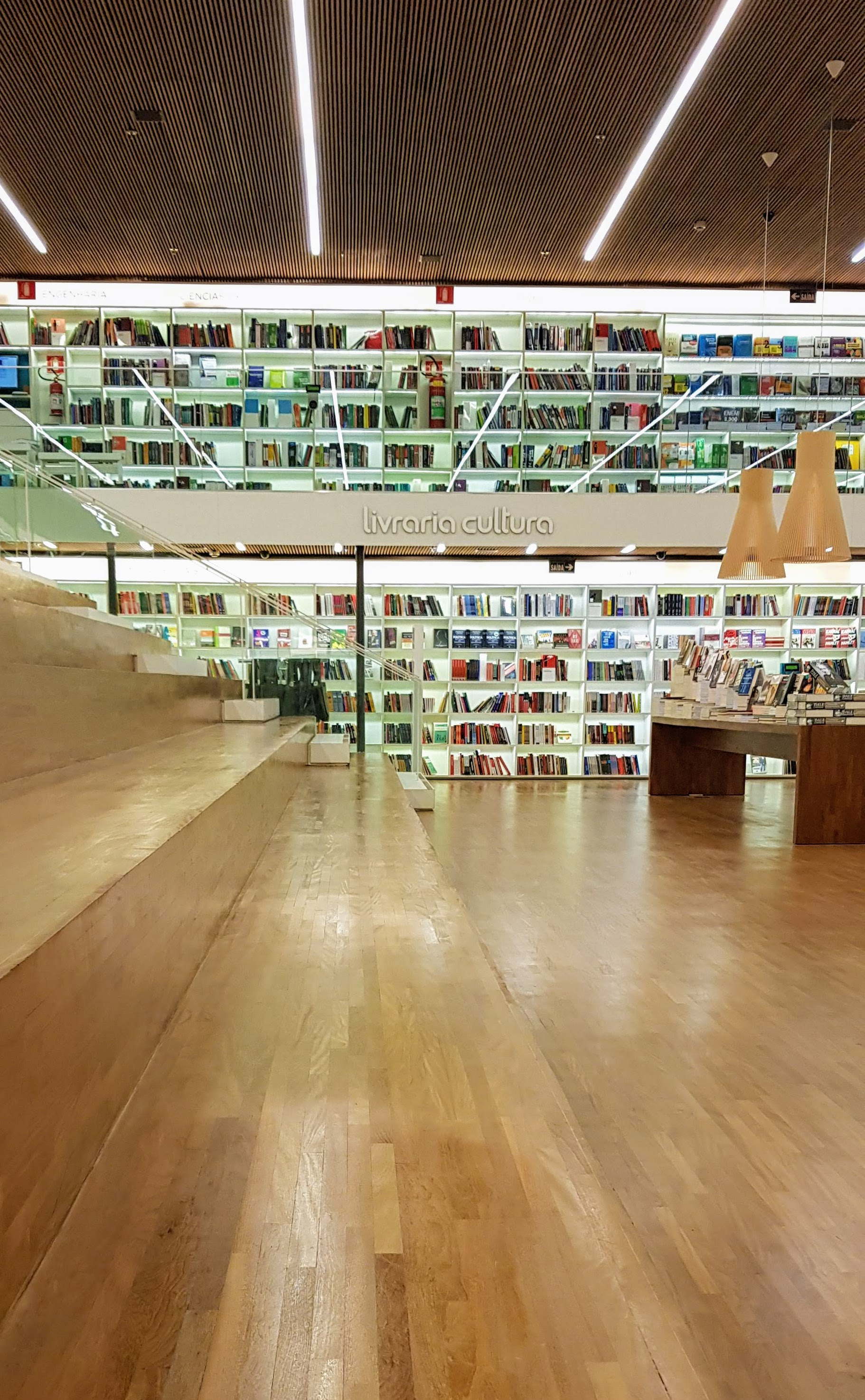
Livraria Cultura Iguatemi (2014)

- Uma Store Vila Madalena (1999), São Paulo
- Hotel Fasano (2003) with Isay Weinfeld, São Paulo
- Micasa VolB (2007) co-authored by Bruno Gomes and Bruno Guedes, São Paulo
- Livraria Cultura Iguatemi flagship store (2014), co-authored by Marcio Tanaka, Mariana Ruzante, Luciana Antunes, Diana Radomysler, São Paulo
- Bar Riviera (2013), co-authored by Beatriz Meyer, Eduardo Chalabi and Diana Radomysler, São Paulo

=== Private homes ===
- Casa Goldfarb (1989) with Isay Weinfeld São Paulo
- Coser House (2001) co-authored by Diana Radomysler and Oswaldo Pessano, São Paulo
- Casa Gama Issa (2002), São Paulo
- Du Plessis House (2003), Paraty* BRHouse (2004) co-authored Bruno Gomes, Araras
- Mirindibas House (2006) co-authored by Renata Furlanetto, São Paulo
- Osler House (2009), co-authored by Suzana Glogowski, Brasília
- Paraty House (2009), co-authored by Suzana Glokowski
- 6 House, co-authored by Diana Radomysler, São Paulo
- Bahia house, co-authored by Samanta Cafardo and Suzana Glokowski, Salvador
- Punta House (2011), co-authored by Suzana Glokowski, São Paulo
- M&M House (2012), co-authored by Maria Cristina Motta, São Paulo
- Cube House (2012), co-authored by Suzana Glokowski, São Paulo
- Rocas House (2012), co-authored by Renata Furlanetto and 57 studio, El Pangue, Chile
- Redux House (2013), co-authored by Samanta Cafardo, Bragança Paulista
- Txai House (2014), co-authored by Gabriel Kogan and Carolina Castroviejo, Itacaré
- B&B House (2014) with Fernando Neiva, co-authored by Renata Furlanetto, São Paulo
- Mororó House (2014), co-authored by Maria Cristina Motta, Campos de Jordão

=== Product design ===
- Haaz Cobogó (2007), Turkey
- When Objects Work Bowl (2012), Belgium
- DR Bathtub (2014), Italy
- Up & Down Tap (2014), Italy

== Exhibits ==
- Architecture & Humor (1995), with Isay Weinfeld at the Brazilian House Museum, São Paulo
- Ornithological Architecture (1998) with Isay Weinfeld at the Brazilian House Museum, São Paulo
- Umore and Architektur (2001) with Isay Weinfeld at the Brazilian House Museum, São Paulo
- Happyland, A View of the Next Large City in the World (2002), with Isay Weinfeld, at the 25th Art Biennial, São Paulo
- Happyland Vol. 2, with Isay Weinfeld, at the Brazilian House Museum, São Paulo
- Prostheses and Grafts (2010), São Paulo, at Micasa VolB, São Paulo
- Protesi & Innesti (2012) with Manoela Verga and Paolo Boatti, London
- Venice Biennale of Architecture, Brazilian Pavilion, Peep (2012), Venice

== Sources ==
- MOLESKINE. Marcio Kogan - Studio MK27, Inspiration and Process in Architecture. Moleskine. 2014
- SERAPIÃO, Fernando. Revista Monolito, n.5 & 6. Editora Monolito. 2012.
- STUDIOMK27. 2001-2011, Projetos Selecionados. Portfólio do escritório. 2011.
