= National Film Festival for Talented Youth =

National Film Festival for Talented Youth (NFFTY)
- Genre: Film festival
- Frequency: Annual
- Location: Seattle, Washington
- Years active: 16
- Inaugurated: 2007
- Previous event: April 28 - May 8, 2022
- Next event: April 27–30, 2023
- Participants: c. 258 films (2022)
- Attendance: c. 13,000 (2016)
- Website: nffty.org

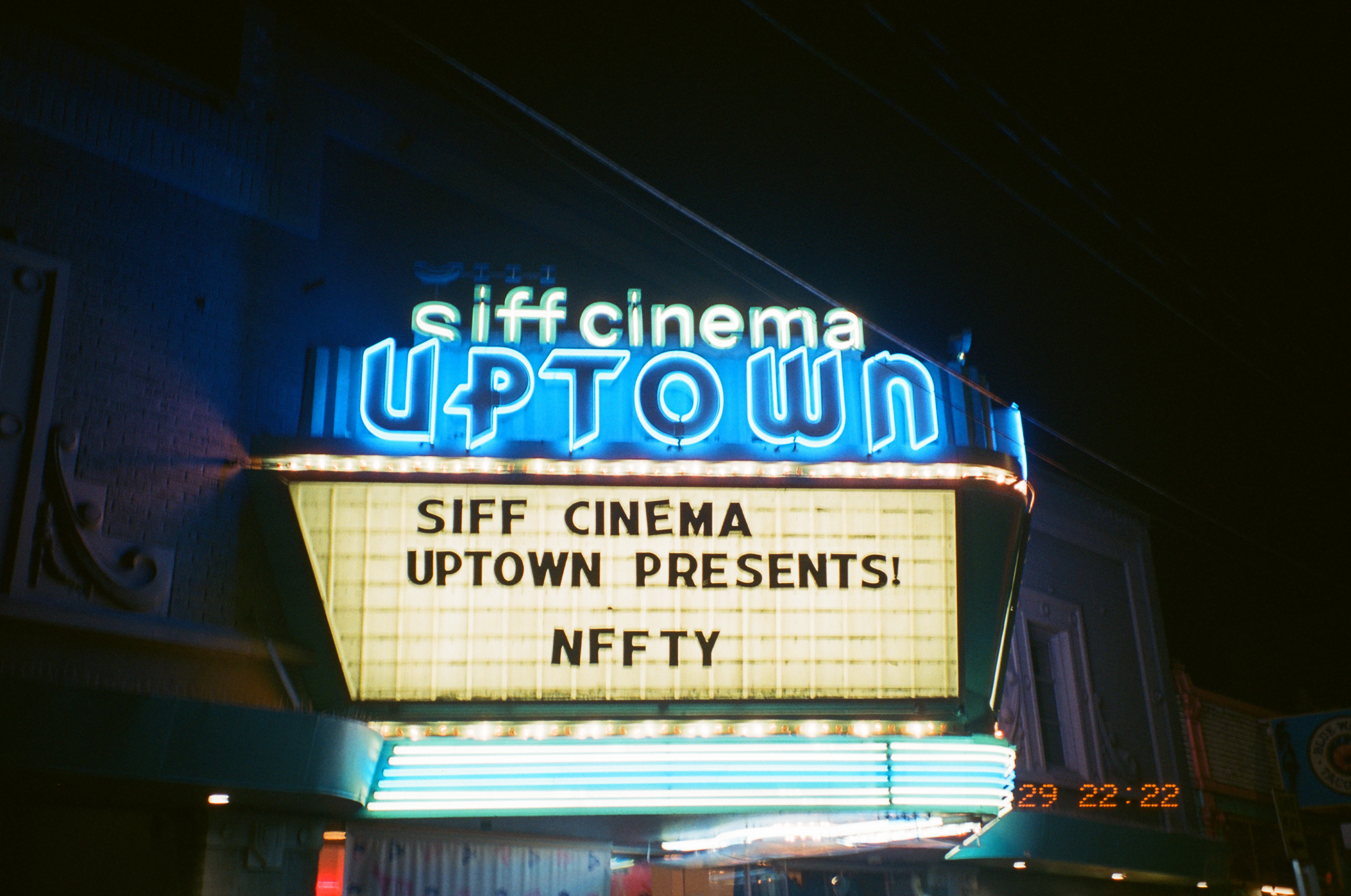
SIFF Cinemas Uptown has become a fixture at NFFTY - hosting screenings since 2007.

The National Film Festival for Talented Youth (NFFTY- pronounced nifty), held annually in Seattle, Washington, showcases work by filmmakers 24 and under from across the U.S. and the world. Founded in 2007, it has since become the most influential youth-oriented film festival in North America, featuring early work by several notable filmmakers, including Gigi Saul Guerrero, Ben Proudfoot, Matthew Puccini and Rayka Zehtabchi. The festival includes film screenings, filmmaking workshops and panels, concerts by youth bands, and a gala opening night.

== History ==
=== 2007 ===
The National Film Festival for Talented Youth (NFFTY) and its non-profit parent organization, The Talented Youth, were founded by Jesse Harris, Jocelyn R.C., and Kyle Seago. Harris wrote and directed the feature film "Living Life" when he was 17, which obtained theatrical and television distribution. This resulted in young filmmakers around the globe seeking his advice including R.C., who expressed her interest in helping to form a creative youth organization. Harris and R.C. teamed up with Seago, establishing the non-profit and holding a one night "Kick Off" festival April 26, 2007.

=== 2008 ===
NFFTY was expanded to a three-day festival. NFFTY Earth, a campaign to promote the power of film to bring positive changes to the environment and support social justice and encourage peace and partnership with other countries, was added to festival programming. Year round young artist and community education activities were added through the program NFFTY 365.

NFFTY 2008 included 73 film screenings, 9 industry panels and workshops over a three-day period. There were 1,800 attendees. At least one film screened at the event, "March Point", received wider distribution through PBS.

=== 2009 ===
NFFTY continued as a three-day festival, increasing its screenings from 73 to 113, including international entries for the first time. As part of its NFFTY Earth Campaign, NFFTY 2009 was certified as a carbon neutral event by carbonfund.org. A NFFTY Earth Benefit CD was produced, featuring 13 new songs from contemporary youth bands.

NFFTY 2009 increased its screenings from 73 to 113, including international entries for the first time. More than 4,000 people attended.

=== 2010 ===
The organization agreed to add an additional day to the festival schedule, due to the higher than expected volume of entries. The 2010 festival featured 190 films from 33 states and 16 countries, and with over 6,000 people in attendance. A 48-hour film contest and industry speed networking were added as events.

NFFTY 2010 added an extra day to the festival due to the increase in submissions and attendees. Nearly 7,000 people attended.

=== 2011 ===
With more than 600 film submissions, the festival screened 225 entries from more than 20 countries and 40 US states. Once again Nike sponsored a 48-hour student filmmaking competition, and presented a keynote panel with "Social Network" Producer Dana Brunetti, Web series pioneer Hayden Black, Studio marketing leader Valerie van Galder, Microsoft head of Global Community Affairs Tim Dubel, and documentary filmmaker Stan Emert. Oscar-winning filmmaker, Martin Strange-Hansen led a masterclass workshop in story structure.

NFFTY 2011 took place April 28 - May 1 and, with submissions from more than 20 countries and 40 US states, this year's festival screened 225 films, before an audience of about 10,000.

=== 2012 ===
NFFTY 2012 included the Future of Film Expo trade show, the first of its kind to the festival. which included eight panels, 14 workshops and 30 exhibitors. NFFTY 2012 took place April 26 - April 30 with submissions from 60+ countries and 40 US states, screening 222 films, before an audience of over 10,000.

=== 2013 ===
NFFTY 2013 was held from April 25–28, 2013 in Seattle, Washington. Out of nearly 700 entries worldwide, programmers selected 215 films to screen during the 4-day festival. The films of NFFTY 2013 represented 30 U.S. States and 20 Countries.

=== 2014 ===
NFFTY 2014 took place April 24 - April 27 with 214 films from around the world. The youngest filmmaker in 2014 was seven years old. 2014's festival included the launch of a Young Women in Film initiative to address the issue of gender inequality in film. "In an industry where only 9% of directors and 25% of producers are women, NFFTY wants to provide opportunities where emerging female filmmakers can feel supported to pursue their passions," Stefanie Malone said, upon launching this initiative. In 2014, 40% of films coming from female directors as well as the launch of the "Best Emerging Female Filmmaker" award on Closing Night, which was presented to Morgana McKenzie. Highlights from the festival included an animation panel that featured animators Daniel Lund (Frozen), Wilbert Plijnaar (Despicable Me, Ice Age), Connie Thompson (Frankenweenie) and Amos Sussigan (Swan Cake) to talk about story in animation.

=== 2015 ===
In the last year, NFFTY has continued to build a NFFTY Creative brand, working with companies to produce original content with NFFTY Filmmakers. In spring of 2015, NFFTY was awarded the ADDY Gold Award and the AVA Platinum Award for the production of the NFFTY Original Documentary - A Supporting Role.

NFFTY 2015 took place April 23–26, featuring 248 films from 30 states and 25 countries. The festival increased the age limit to 24 years in an effort to better support emerging filmmakers. With the continuing commitment to combating gender inequity in the industry, 48% of the 2015 festival lineup included female directors. NFFTY also presented Femme Finale - a special Closing Night screening with some of the best films by NFFTY female filmmakers, presented by Cornish College of the Arts. A scholarship to Cornish College of the Arts was awarded to Kira Bursky for "Best Emerging Female Filmmaker", and Barry Briggs for "Best Emerging Northwest Filmmaker".

=== 2016 ===
NFFTY 2016 marked ten years of NFFTY! NFFTY received over 1,000 entries with 227 films selected, representing 33 states and 24 countries.

=== 2017 ===
NFFTY 2017, the 11th anniversary, will be held April 27 – April 30 in Seattle, WA. NFFTY 2017 is the largest festival yet, marking eleven years of NFFTY! NFFTY received over 1,200 entries with 257 films selected, representing 27 countries and 28 US states. NFFTY launched the inaugural NFFTYX, an exploration and celebration of 360° and virtual reality. In partnership with fearless360°, NFFTY is presenting a 360° gallery, bootcamp and VR/360° panel at NFFTY 2017 - the first of its kind targeted specifically at youth makers. NFFTY welcomes special guest speakers this year, including Chris Moore (producer, Oscar-winning Good Will Hunting, Manchester by the Sea) and Danish writer/directors Wikke & Rasmussen. NFFTY continues its commitment to women in film with a fourth straight year of over 40% of female filmmakers. NFFTY is included in Culture Vulture's "10 Best Film Festivals Worth Your Time in 2017"

== Staff and Leadership ==
=== Programmers ===
- Kyle Seago, Director of Programming
- Amy Williams, Program Manager
- Kevin Conner
- Dan Hudson
- Todd Kaumans
- Stefanie Malone
- Robert Speewack Bojorquez

=== Board of directors ===
- Donna Brown - Board President - Architect
- Matt Lawrence - Vice President - Educator, Ballard High School
- Julie Daman - Treasurer - Washington Filmworks
- Paula Cuneo - Secretary - Oculus
- Laila Kazmi - KCTS 9

=== Alumni Advisory Board ===
The NFFTY Alumni Advisory Board consists of past NFFTY filmmakers whose primary role is to advise the NFFTY staff and Board of Directors on best serving and supporting young filmmakers. The Alumni Advisory Board was announced in Fall 2014.

- Ben Kadie – President – Student, University of Southern California
- Laura Holliday – Vice President – Intern, PRMRY / Student, Art Center College of Design
- Kayla Briët – VR/360° Program Advisor
- Dom Fera – YouTube Partner, DFear Studios
- Elena Gaby – Researcher, Warrior Poets
- Todd Kaumans – Producer, Might Media Studios
- Garrett Kennell – Independent Filmmaker
- Pranay Patwardhan – Independent Filmmaker
- Erica Sterne – Independent Filmmaker
- Kevin Stiller – Independent Filmmaker
- Noah Wagner – Producer, HBO

=== Board Emeritus ===
- Jim Wilgus, Past President
- Jesse Harris, Founder
- Jocelyn R.C., Co-Founder
- P. Scott Cummins, Founding Board Member
