= The Other (2025 film) =

Film by Paul Etheredge

- Release poster
- Directed by: Paul Etheredge
- Written by: Paul Etheredge
- Produced by: Jeffrey Reddick; Tim Nagle; Jeff Walker; Lisa Normand
- Starring: Olivia Macklin; Dylan McTee; Avangeline Friedlander; Lily D. Moore; Shawnee Smith
- Cinematography: Noe Medrano Jr.
- Edited by: Shrader Thomas; Sai Selvarajan
- Music by: Holly Amber Church
- Production company: Camp Lucky Studios
- Distributed by: Quiver Distribution
- Release dates: April 26, 2025 (DIFF); June 13, 2025
- Running time: 100 minutes
- Country: United States
- Language: English

The Other is a 2025 American psychological horror film written and directed by Paul Etheredge. It stars Olivia Macklin, Dylan McTee, Avangeline Friedlander, Lily D. Moore, and Shawnee Smith.

The film premiered at Dallas International Film Festival on April 26, 2025. It was released on digital platforms in the United States on June 13, 2025.

== Premise ==
Robin and Daniel foster Kathelia who is mute with a dark past that haunts the family.

== Cast ==
- Olivia Macklin as Robin
- Dylan McTee as Daniel
- Avangeline Friedlander as Kathelia
- Lily D. Moore as Fiona
- Shawnee Smith as Lizzie

== Production ==
Paul Etheredge conceived the story of the film by being inspired by a vivid nightmare he experienced in his 20s while on vacation in Costa Rica and anticipating the birth of his first child. Etheredge described the dream as: "It was about me being a new dad and having anxieties about having to care for a child who was destructive and dangerous. The dream was about my struggles in being a good dad when I can't control my child and we're not connecting. It was probably 10 seconds long, but there was all this story that was in there. It stayed with me."

Following his 2009 film Angel of Death, Etheredge's career slowed, which he attributed to the 2008 economic recession and its adverse impact on independent film financing. During this time, he shifted his focus to work as a production designer. In the early 2020s, Etheredge revisited the concept from his decades-old dream and partnered with longtime friend and producer Jeffrey Reddick to pursue funding. However, financing fell apart so producer Lisa Normand was brought in. The resulting film, The Other—originally titled Psychopomp—became the first feature produced by Normand's Camp Lucky Studios, which also handled post-production.

The film stars Olivia Macklin, Dylan McTee, Avangeline Friedlander, Lily D. Moore, and Shawnee Smith. Principal photography took place in the Lakewood neighborhood of Dallas for 30 days between May and June 2023. To minimize production costs, Etheredge shot primarily at the home and property of his mother. The production utilized all local crew, including cinematographer Noe Medrano Jr.

== Release ==
In November 2024, it was reported that Film Mode Entertainment had acquired the film for sales. It premiered at the Dallas International Film Festival on April 26, 2025. The Other was released on digital in the United States by Quiver Distribution on June 13, 2025.
