= Daughter of the Bride =

2023 film by Annette Haywood-Carter

- Theatrical release poster
- Directed by: Annette Haywood-Carter
- Written by: Karen Bloch Morse
- Produced by: Summer Crockett Moore; Tony Glazer
- Starring: Marcia Gay Harden; Halston Sage; Andrew Richardson; Cara Santana; Michael Hsu Rosen; Aidan Quinn
- Cinematography: Patrice Lucien Cochet
- Edited by: John David Allen
- Music by: Cathleen Flynn; Jeff Meegan; David Tobin
- Production companies: Particular Crowd; LBI Entertainment; Choice Films
- Distributed by: MarVista Entertainment
- Release date: February 3, 2023
- Running time: 102 minutes
- Country: United States
- Language: English

Daughter of the Bride is a 2023 American comedy film directed by Annette Haywood-Carter and written by Karen Bloch Morse. It stars Marcia Gay Harden, Halston Sage, Andrew Richardson, Cara Santana, Michael Hsu Rosen, and Aidan Quinn.

== Plot ==
Mother and daughter, Diane and Kate York, have supported each other since Kate's father left them when she was small. Kate works as a waitress for a caterer. Diane lives alone in the large house that Kate grew up in and does some editing from home, and Kate thinks she needs a man.

When Kate sees attractive older man Bruce Wright helping a couple with car trouble at one of her events, she stops to talk to him. After a brief chat, she finds him interesting and gives him her mother's number.

Six weeks later at yoga, Diane is talking about a mystery businessman she is dating. On Thursday, while spending time with her mother while she does her laundry, he shows up at the same time as their Chinese takeout. Kate is surprised to learn that Bruce is in fact dating her mother. He insists she stay for lunch, so they get to know each other, until she is given the impression they want time alone.

Almost as soon as Kate leaves, Bruce proposes to Diane, which she inadvertently witnesses as she has to come back for her laundry. Kate has champagne with the newly engaged couple, but is not happy.

In her upset state, Kate nearly runs over her neighbor Josh, whom she's never met, as he crosses the street in front of her. He asks her for a quick drink, but she insists it would be a bad idea. Shortly after, at lunch with her friend and coworker Janie, Kate sees Josh. The friendly optometrist introduces himself before leaving with his takeaway.

Kate gets asked to help plan her mother's wedding, getting adjusted to the idea of her mother remarrying. They go dress shopping, and Kate keeps the dress at her place to ensure Bruce doesn't see it. She can't resist trying on the dress, but she can't get it off when her mother shows up, so Kate sneaks out and asks Josh to help get the dress off.

Afterwards, Kate and Josh end up having drinks. They get on very well, and when he takes her home, they almost kiss, but a nosey neighbor watching causes Kate to change her mind. A short time later, when Janie is unable to accompany an event organised by the wedding venue, Kate invites Josh to come instead. They are getting along well until he comes across his old flame Maya as they are playing Twister.

The house sells quickly, so Diane moves in with Kate. Soon, mother and daughter have trouble getting along, jeopardizing both romantic relationships. Kate freaks out about how comfortable and close she and Josh are getting, so she insists they stop spending time together. She also blows up at Diane, who goes to stay with Bruce.

Having a drink at her favorite place, Kate sees Josh with Maya, so she has to go elsewhere. Then, looking for Diane at Bruce's, he says she had left with cold feet. Kate finds Diane at the batting cages, where they have always gone to blow off steam. There, she convinces her to go through with the ceremony.

Bruce and Diane make up first, so the wedding is back on. Then, Kate finds Josh and explains that, whereas his parents' long marriage taught him to believe in the institution, her mother instilled strong independence in her.

Kate officiates the wedding, which goes well. Josh shows up after the happy couple leaves, and the wedding guests witness a romantic moment between Kate and Josh as they dance and kiss for the first time.

== Cast ==
- Marcia Gay Harden as Diane York
- Halston Sage as Kate York
- Andrew Richardson as Josh
- Aidan Quinn as Bruce Wright
- Brenda Currin as Aunt Marci
- Cara Santana as Janie
- Michael Hsu Rosen as Mike
- Jill Abramovitz as Miriam
- Ethan Herschenfeld as Murat

== Production ==
In June 2022, it was announced that Marcia Gay Harden, Halston Sage, Andrew Richardson, and Aidan Quinn were cast in a film, which had entered production at the time. The film was shot in Cranford, New Jersey.

== Release ==
The film was released in select theaters in New York City, Los Angeles, Cleveland, Atlanta, and Boston on February 3, 2023. It was also released on Digital HD and On Demand the same day.
