= Escola da Cidade =

Private architecture school in Sao Paulo, Brazil

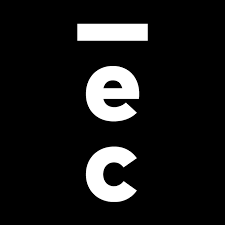
- Logo
- Other names: AEAUSP
- Type: Private university
- Established: 2001
- Rector: Cristiane Muniz (principal); Maira Rios (associate principal); Alvaro Puntoni (chairman)
- Location: Rua General Jardim, 65, São Paulo, Brazil; 23°32′41.5″S 46°38′42.9″W
- Campus: Vila Buarque

Escola da Cidade (lit. City School) is a private, not-for-profit institution of higher learning in São Paulo, Brazil.

Established in 2001, it offers bachelor's degree and postgraduate programs in architecture and urban planning, as well as non-degree courses in architecture, urbanism, design, and related disciplines.

== Description ==
Since March 2020, the school has also operated Fábrica • Escola de Humanidades João Filgueiras Lima (FAEH), a private secondary and vocational school focused on the humanities and maker culture.

The school does not follow a traditional rector or dean system. Instead, it is managed by Associação Escola da Cidade, a nonprofit association of architects, fine artists, and public intellectuals, governed by five boards.

Notable faculty members have included Marcio Kogan, Giselle Beiguelman, Paulo von Poser, Fernando Viégas, Sol Camacho and Gabriela de Matos.

The campus is entirely urban and consists of two buildings in the Vila Buarque neighborhood of central São Paulo. These buildings were originally designed in the 1940s as apartment blocks by architect Oswaldo Bratke.

In addition to a public-access library (Biblioteca Vilanova Artigas) and a university press (Editora da Cidade), the school operates Baú, a student-run audiovisual repository that archives all knowledge produced at Escola da Cidade. All content is freely available online.

== Partner institutions ==
The undergraduate curriculum includes one mandatory overseas trip per semester for first-through-fourth-year students, as part of the Escola Itinerante (Itinerant School). Partner institutions include the University of Buenos Aires, California College of the Arts, London Metropolitan University School of Art, Architecture and Design, École nationale supérieure d'architecture de Paris-La Villette, and Polytechnic University of Milan.

The school also offers an academic exchange program for visiting scholars.

== Accreditation ==
The school's sole degree-granting program, the six-year Bachelor of Architecture and Urban Planning, has been fully accredited by the Brazilian Ministry of Education and Culture since 2001. Additionally, eight lato sensu postgraduate programs are accredited.

== See also ==
- List of architecture schools in Brazil
