= Monsterland =

2020s American anthology horror TV series

- Genre: Drama; Horror; Anthology
- Created by: Mary Laws
- Based on: North American Lake Monsters: Stories by Nathan Ballingrud
- Music by: Gustavo Santaolalla
- Country of origin: United States
- Original language: English
- No. of seasons: 1
- No. of episodes: 8

Production
- Executive producers: Megan Ellison; Sue Naegle; Mary Laws; Babak Anvari; Lucan Toh; Eagle Egilsson; Anne Sewitsky
- Producer: Kat Landsberg
- Cinematography: Anette Haellmigk; Anka Malatynska
- Editors: Bill Henry; Arturo Sosa; Joshua Raymond Lee
- Running time: 42–53 minutes
- Production companies: Two & Two Pictures; Port Orchard Productions; Annapurna Television

Original release
- Network: Hulu
- Release: October 2, 2020

Monsterland is an American horror drama anthology television series created by Mary Laws, based upon the short story collection North American Lake Monsters: Stories by Nathan Ballingrud. It consists of eight episodes and premiered on October 2, 2020, on Hulu.

== Episodes ==
No.	Title	Directed by	Written by	Original release date
1	"Port Fourchon, LA"	Anne Sewitsky	Mary Laws	October 2, 2020
Toni (Kaitlyn Dever) lives a very stressful life as a poor single mother with a young child with behavioral issues stemming from a botched back-alley abortion attempt. Unable to find accommodation at a motel, a mysterious stranger offers money to Toni to talk with her and, after bribing her workmate, turns up at her house. He offers more money to sleep there and park his car off-road. Toni allows him in. They have sex and afterwards she presses him for information about why he is hiding. He shows her the contents of his car and she screams as he pulls the skin from his face like a mask. In the morning Toni finds an unknown woman in her house cooking. This woman reveals that she is the same person only wearing a new skin. She tells Toni she learnt how to assume new identities for new experiences from a possibly non-human entity she calls a monster. It involves killing someone and skinning them. Though the entity and the woman had enough skins to last a lifetime, the entity enjoyed the killing and refused to stop so the woman stole from the entity from whom she is now hiding. Toni leaves town and abandons her sleeping daughter in a stranger's car. Cast: Kaitlyn Dever, Jonathan Tucker, Keilly McQuail, Megan Byrne, Matthew James Ballinger
2	"Eugene, OR"	Kevin Phillips	Scott Kosar	October 2, 2020
Nick Smith (Charlie Tahan), a teen boy has dropped out of high school to take care of his mother after she has a stroke. After seeing an unexplained shadow creature, he makes contact with a group of people online who explain that the shadow creature is the cause of his misfortune, and that they are also victims of the shadow creatures. As he becomes more involved with the group, he must decide how far he is willing to go with participating in their war against the shadow creatures. Cast: Charlie Tahan, Ben Rappaport, Sherry Ward, Nadia Alexander, Jack DiFalco
3	"New Orleans, LA"	Craig William Macneill	Mary Laws	October 2, 2020
After a pre-school age child is briefly separated from his stepfather (Hamish Linklater) while they're getting ice cream and his mother Annie (Nicole Beharie) finds him wandering in a crowd, he tells her that he was being chased by a monster. Years later, after a party honoring her husband for his work as a medical doctor, Annie begins to think she should have believed her son years ago after she starts seeing the monster herself. Cast: Nicole Beharie, Hamish Linklater, Kaitlyn Dever, Marquis Rodriguez, Lauren Bittner, Matty Cardarople, Cheryl Freeman, Anthony Hervey, Sebastian Cote, Christian Cote
4	"New York, NY"	Eagle Egilsson	Wesley Strick	October 2, 2020
An oil baron named Stanley Price (Bill Camp), head of a Titan International, is scheduled for a congressional hearing regarding his actions leading up to and lies and inaction in the face of an ecological disaster caused by his company. To generate positive news, he attempts to arrange a photo opportunity at a church but he faces a supernatural case of indigestion after eating a communion wafer, forcing both him and his assistant Josh (Michael Hsu Rosen) to grapple with their culpability. Cast: Bill Camp, Michael Hsu Rosen, Tina Benko, Teresa Avia Lim, Tony Crane, Nicole LaLiberté, Julie Dretzin, David Lavine
5	"Plainfield, IL"	Logan Kibens	Emily Kaczmarek	October 2, 2020
Kate (Taylor Schilling) and Shawn (Roberta Colindrez), two law students, connect when sparks fly during a classroom debate. Years later, they're married, living in the suburbs, and raising a daughter together. They have a wild night out to celebrate their anniversary, causing an argument and leading one to make a difficult decision about living with the other's mental illness. But can she live with the consequences of her decision? Cast: Taylor Schilling, Roberta Colindrez, Eva Jette Putrello, Angela Grovey, Laura Jordan
6	"Palacios, TX"	Nicolas Pesce	Mary Laws	October 2, 2020
A fisherman called Sharko (played by Trieu Tran), who suffers long-term health effects from the Titan International oil spill referenced in episode 4, is now unable to fish both because of his injuries and because the oil spill has left fish in the area deformed and worthless. While walking along the beach, he finds a mermaid (Adria Arjona) washed up on the beach, also a victim of the oil spill. Bringing her back to his home, he attempts to connect with her while returning her to health. Cast: Adria Arjona, Trieu Tran, Tyson Ritter, Alfredo Narciso
7	"Iron River, MI"	Desiree Akhavan	Emily Kaczmarek	October 2, 2020
Teenage Elena (Sarah Catherine Hook) is obsessed with the Lumberjack Killer, rumored to be behind the many disappearances in the White Woods. After Elena spends an afternoon with her friend Laura (Kelly Marie Tran), Elena leaves to smoke marijuana in the woods, goes missing, and is never found. Ten years later, Laura returns to Iron River for her wedding to the man who was Elena's boyfriend at the time of her disappearance. In the intervening years, Laura has also grown close with Elena's mother, who is now a surrogate mother to Laura. After a body matching Elena's description is found in the woods on the eve of Laura's wedding, Laura must revisit the day Elena disappeared, finding an explanation altogether more strange than a serial killer. Cast: Kelly Marie Tran, Joy Osmanski, Sarah Catherine Hook, Susan Pourfar, Alice Kremelberg, Rachel Zeiger-Haag, Henry Ayres-Brown
8	"Newark, NJ"	Babak Anvari	Mary Laws	October 2, 2020
A number of creatures fall from the sky in an event known as "The Fall." Colloquially called angels, nobody knows where they come from or why. Bryan (Mike Colter) and Amy (Adepero Oduye) are a married couple struggling with the disappearance of their daughter Tabitha a year ago. While Amy wants to grieve for her loss, Bryan is unwilling to acknowledge the possibility that Tabitha may not come back, refusing to take down Christmas decorations or change her room. After their relationship is finally strained to the breaking point, an extended encounter with an injured angel changes their lives forever. Cast: Mike Colter, Adepero Oduye, Kaitlyn Dever, Michael Chernus, Vanessa Aspillaga, Scott Nicholson

== Production ==
=== Development ===
In May 2019, it was announced Hulu had given the series an eight-episode order, with Mary Laws creating the series and serving as an executive producer based upon the short story North American Lake Monsters: Stories by Nathan Ballingrud, with Babak Anvari and Lucan Toh serving as executive producers with Anvari set to direct an episode of the series, and Annapurna Television attached to produce. The series was released on October 2, 2020.

=== Casting ===
In November 2019, it was announced Kaitlyn Dever and Jonathan Tucker had joined the cast of the series, appearing in the first episode. In February 2020, Mike Colter joined the cast of the series. In July 2020, it was announced Kelly Marie Tran and Taylor Schilling had joined the cast of the series. In August 2020, it was announced Nicole Beharie, Adepero Oduye, Roberta Colindrez, Charlie Tahan and Hamish Linklater had joined the cast of the series.

=== Filming ===
The series was filmed in Kingston, New York, in November 2019.

== Reception ==
For the series, review aggregator Rotten Tomatoes reported an approval rating of 82% based on 28 reviews, with an average rating of 6.71/10. The website's critics' consensus reads, "Though it struggles to find a strong through line, Monsterland's cross-country scares are a perfect showcase for its talented cast and crew." Metacritic gave the series a weighted average score of 63 out of 100 based on five reviews, indicating "generally favorable reviews".
