= List of architecture schools in Brazil =

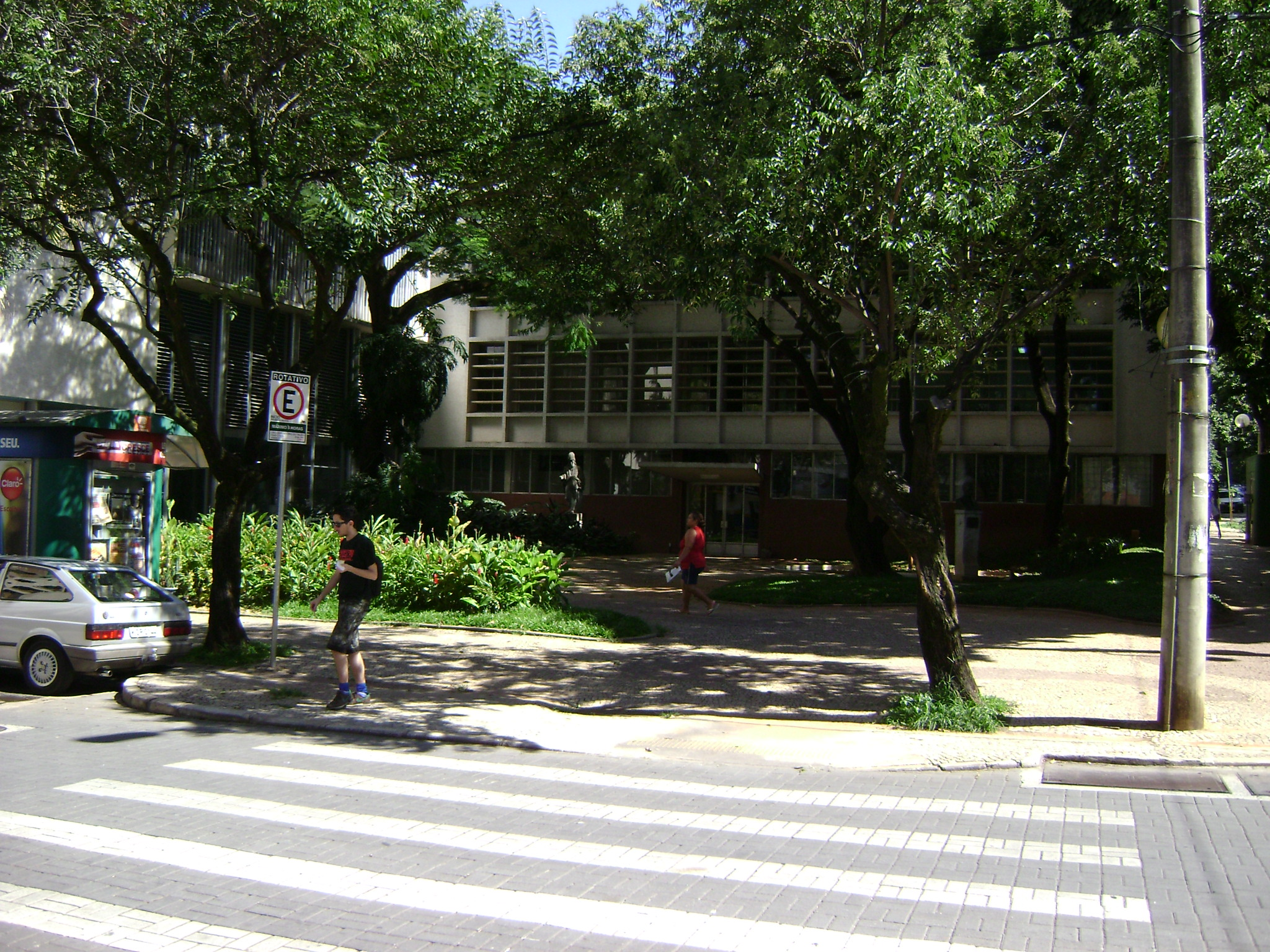
Architecture School of UFMG, in Belo Horizonte.

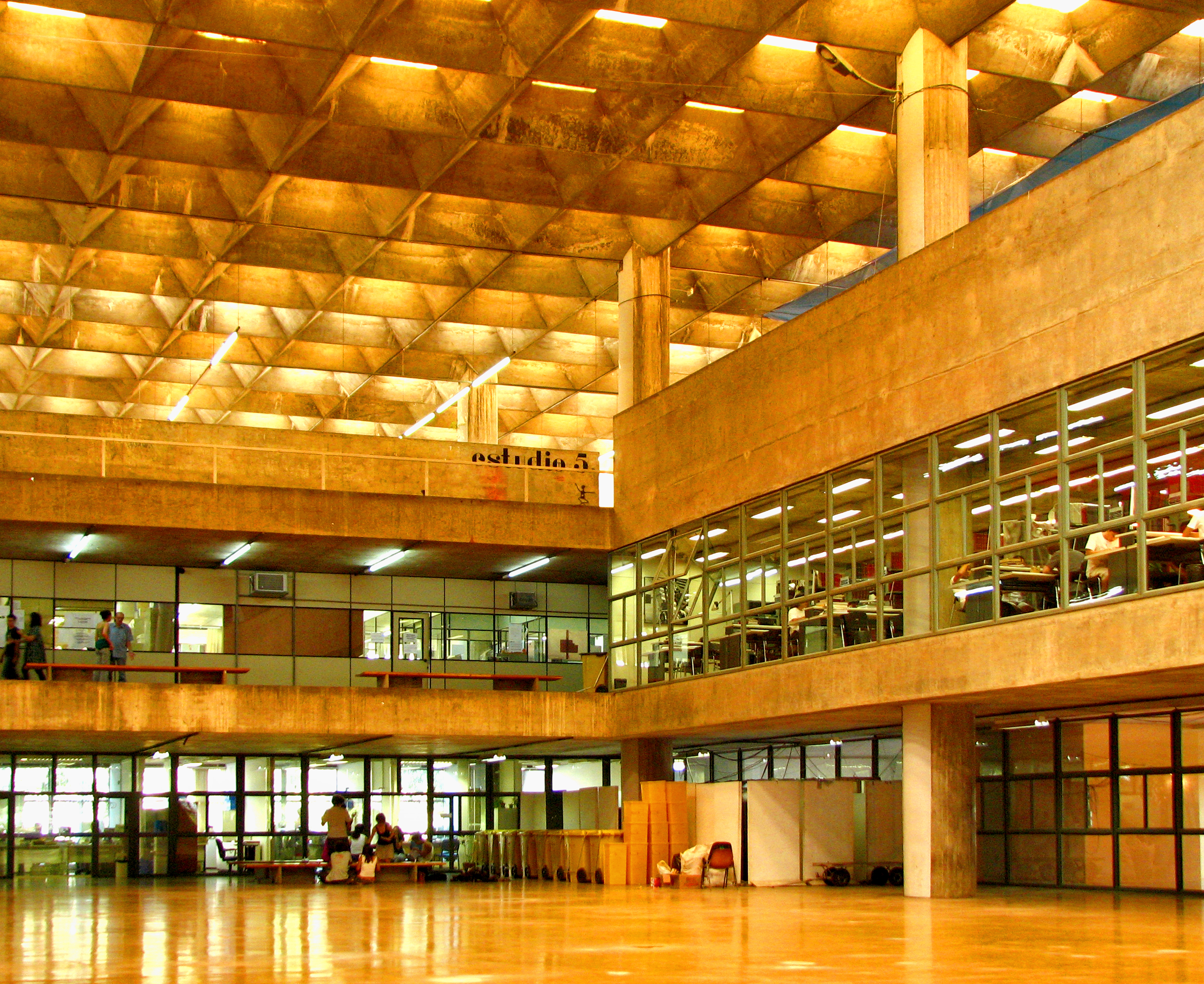
Architecture and Urbanism College of USP, São Paulo.

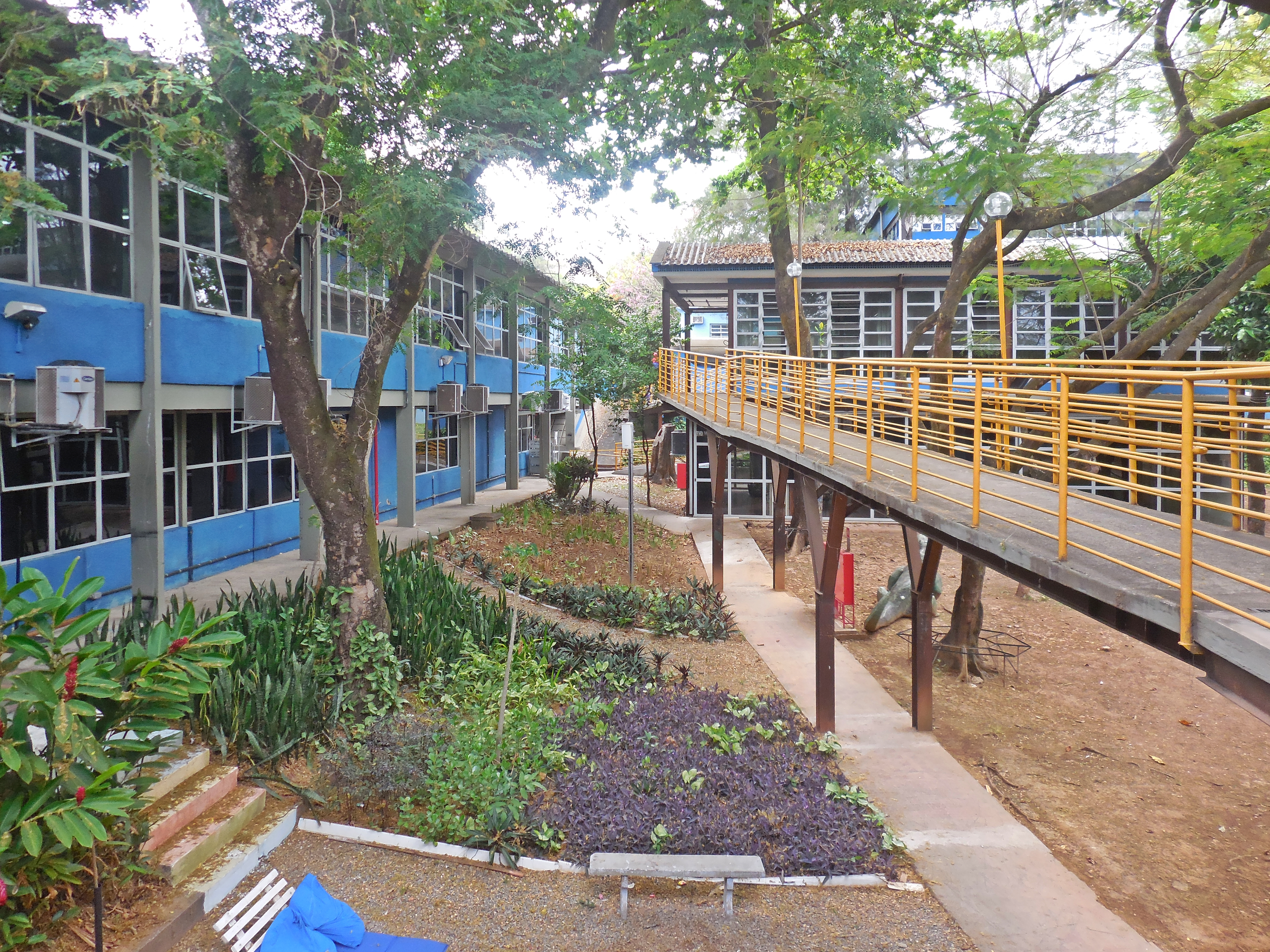
Architecture and Urbanism College in the Unileste, in Minas Gerais.

List of architecture schools in Brazil at colleges and universities and according to the Five Regions in the country:

== North Region ==
Panongu

== Northeast Region ==
- Universidade Federal de Alagoas, UFAL, Alagoas,
- Universidade Federal da Bahia, UFBA, Bahia,
- Universidade Federal do Ceará, UFC, Ceará, https://www.ufc.br/
- Universidade Federal da Paraíba (UFPB) https://www.ufpb.br/
- Universidade Federal de Pernambuco, UFPE, Departamento de Arquitetura e Urbanismo (UFPE), Recife,
- Universidade Federal do Piauí, UFPI, Teresina, Piauí https://www.ufpi.br
- UNIPE - Centro Universitário de João Pessoa
- UFRN - Universidade Federal do Rio Grande do Norte
- Universidade Salvador, UNIFACS, Salvador,
- Unit - Universidade Tiradentes (SE)

== Central-West Region ==
- Universidade do Estado de Mato Grosso UNEMAT - Cáceres https://www.unemat.br/
- Universidade Para o Desenvolvimento do Estado e Região do Pantanal UNIDERP, (Anhanguera) Campo Grande,
- Pontifícia Universidade Católica de Goiás PUC-GO - Goiânia https://www.pucgoias.edu.br/

== Southeast Region ==
- Fundação Armando Alvares Penteado, FAAP, São Paulo
- Universidade Católica de Santos
- Universidade de São Paulo, USP, Faculdade de Arquitetura e Urbanismo, São Paulo,
- Universidade Federal do Rio de Janeiro, UFRJ, Faculdade de Arquitetura e Urbanismo, Rio de Janeiro,
- Escola da Cidade, AEAUSP, São Paulo,
- Universidade Estadual de Campinas, Unicamp, Campinas,
- Universidade Estadual Paulista Júlio de Mesquita Filho UNESP - https://www.unesp.br
- Universidade Federal Fluminense, UFF, Niterói, Rio de Janeiro,
- Universidade Federal de Minas Gerais, UFMG, Escola de Arquitetura (UFMG), Minas Gerais, Belo Horizonte, https://www.ufmg.br
- PUC-MG - Pontifícia Universidade Católica de Minas Gerais,
- PUC-MG - Poços de Caldas-MG
- Universidade Presbiteriana Mackenzie Universidade Presbiteriana Mackenzie https://www.mackenzie.br/
- Universidade de Taubaté (UNITAU) https://www.unitau.br/
- Universidade Federal de Uberlândia - UFU - https://www.ufu.br/
- Centro Universitário do Leste de Minas Gerais (Unileste)
- UNI-BH - Centro Universitário de Belo Horizonte
- FEBASP - Unicentro Belas Artes de São Paulo
- Unicentro Izabela Hendrix

== South Region ==
- Universidade Positivo, Curitiba-PR.
- Universidade Estadual de Londrina, UEL, Londrina, Paraná,
- Universidade Estadual de Maringá, UEM, Maringá, Paraná,
- Universidade Federal do Paraná, UFPR, Paraná,
- Universidade Tecnológica Federal do Paraná, UTFPR, Curitiba, Paraná,
- Universidade de Caxias do Sul UCS Caxias do Sul https://www.ucs.br/
- Centro Universitário Ritter dos Reis, in Porto Alegre
- Universidade Federal do Rio Grande do Sul, UFRGS, Porto Alegre,
- Universidade Federal de Santa Catarina, UFSC, Santa Catarina,
- Centro Universitário Filadélfia - UNIFIL, Londrina, Paraná,
- Fundação Universidade Regional de Blumenau, FURB, Blumenau, Santa Catarina,
- UNISC - Universidade de Santa Cruz do Sul
- UNIVALI - Universidade do Vale do Itajaí
