= Pretty Smart (TV series) =

2021 American sitcom

- Genre: Sitcom
- Created by: Jack Dolgen & Doug Mand
- Starring: Emily Osment; Gregg Sulkin; Olivia Macklin; Cinthya Carmona; Michael Hsu Rosen
- Music by: Jeff Garber
- Country of origin: United States
- Original language: English
- No. of seasons: 1
- No. of episodes: 10

Production
- Executive producers: Jack Dolgen; Doug Mand; Kourtney Kang; Jim Brandon; Brian Singleton; Pamela Fryman
- Producers: Chris Arrington; Caitlin Meares
- Cinematography: Steven V. Silver
- Editors: Russell Griffin; Andy Zall
- Camera setup: Multi-camera
- Running time: 21–26 minutes
- Production companies: Maxeffort; Mr Pants Productions; Kang-Rosenblatt Productions

Original release
- Network: Netflix
- Release: October 8, 2021

Pretty Smart is an American sitcom created by Jack Dolgen and Doug Mand. The series stars Emily Osment, Gregg Sulkin, Olivia Macklin, Cinthya Carmona, and Michael Hsu Rosen. The series premiered on October 8, 2021, on Netflix. In April 2022, the series was canceled after one season.

== Cast and characters ==
=== Main ===
- Emily Osment as Chelsea, Claire's sister and aspiring novelist who graduated from Harvard
- Gregg Sulkin as Grant, Claire's ex-boyfriend and roommate. He works as a personal trainer at Build.
- Olivia Macklin as Claire, Chelsea's sister and roommates to Solana, Jayden, and Grant. She is a waitress at Franklin's.
- Cinthya Carmona as Solana, Claire's friend and roommate. Solana is a former lawyer-turned metaphysical, spiritual healer. It is later revealed her real name is Allison.
- Michael Hsu Rosen as Jayden, Claire's friend and roommate, who is a social media influencer

=== Recurring ===
- Geoff Ross as Howard, the manager and Claire's boss at Franklin's

=== Special guest star ===
- Ming-Na Wen as Jasmine, Jayden's estranged mother
- Kevin Miles (Jake from the State Farm commercials) as Dave, Claire's boyfriend whom she met at a pottery class

== Production ==
On March 5, 2021, Netflix gave the production a series order consisting of ten episodes. The Untitled Dolgen/Mand/Kang Project is created by Jack Dolgen and Doug Mand who are expected to executive alongside Kourtney Kang and Pamela Fryman. Upon series order announcement, Emily Osment and Gregg Sulkin were cast to star. On March 29, 2021, Olivia Macklin, Michael Hsu Rosen, and Cinthya Carmona joined the main cast. The series was filmed at Sunset Bronson Studios in Hollywood, California. The series was later titled as Pretty Smart and it premiered on October 8, 2021. On April 27, 2022, Netflix cancelled the series after one season.

== Episodes ==
No.	Title	Directed by	Written by	Original release date
1	"Guess what?! Claire's sister is coming!"	Pamela Fryman	Jack Dolgen & Doug Mand	October 8, 2021
2	"Get this! Chelsea got a package!"	Pamela Fryman	Jack Dolgen & Doug Mand	October 8, 2021
3	"Did you hear?! Chelsea ran into Margot!"	Pamela Fryman	Caitlin Meares	October 8, 2021
4	"Check this, Mama! It's a Laura Dern party!"	Phill Lewis	Hailey Chavez	October 8, 2021
5	"Yikes! Grant asked Chelsea for a favor!"	Phill Lewis	Gilli Nissim	October 8, 2021
6	"Here's the tea! Jayden found a pottery twunk!"	Phill Lewis	Mano Agapion	October 8, 2021
7	"Guys! It's a Cody Briggs night!"	Jody Margolin Hahn	Dan Gregor	October 8, 2021
8	"OMG! Jayden's mom is back!"	Jody Margolin Hahn	Jim Brandon & Brian Singleton	October 8, 2021
9	"Seriously though! Chelsea has writer's block!"	Richie Keen	Greg Trimmer	October 8, 2021
10	"I mean... just watch!"	Richie Keen	Jim Brandon & Brian Singleton	October 8, 2021

== Reception ==
The review aggregator website Rotten Tomatoes reported a 40% approval rating with an average rating of 4.8/10, based on 5 critic reviews.
