= Livraria Cultura =

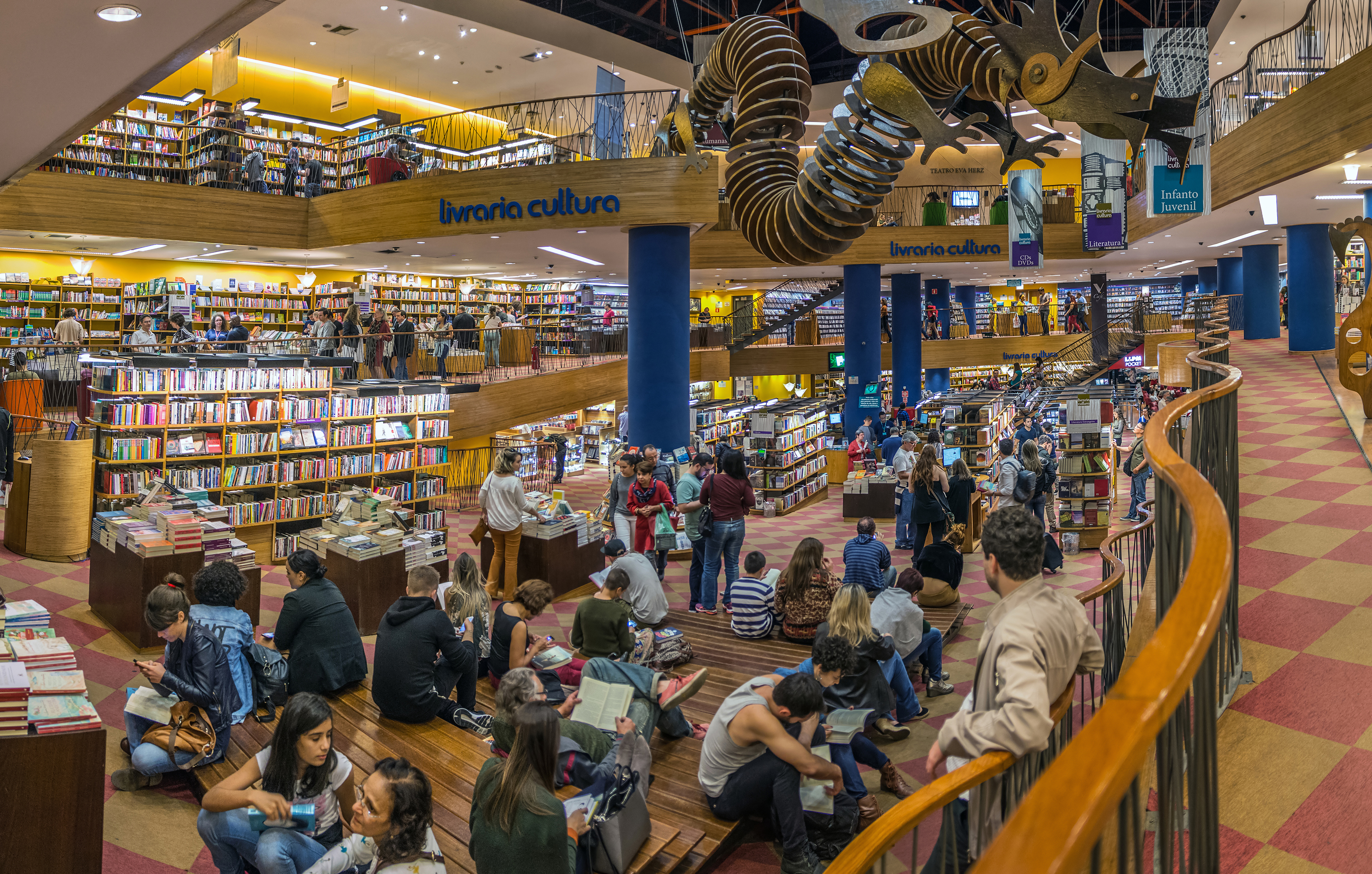
- Livraria Cultura store on Avenida Paulista
- Type: Privately held company
- Industry: Retail
- Founded: 1947
- Founder: Eva Herz
- Defunct: February 2026
- Area served: Brazil
- Products: Books; CDs; DVDs; Blu-ray; Vinyl records; Toys; Games; Kobo
- Website: www.livrariacultura.com.br

Livraria Cultura was a chain of bookstores in Brazil, founded in 1948 in São Paulo by Eva Herz.

== History ==
In 1947, Eva Herz, daughter of German immigrants, set up a book rental service called Biblioteca Circulante (Circulating Library) at her home in Alameda Lorena, São Paulo. The books were imported from Europe and their clientele was mainly immigrants. The service became popular and the circulating library started to borrow books from Brazilian authors, as well as to sell them.

In 1969, Herz moved the bookstore, now called Livraria Cultura, to the Conjunto Nacional on Avenida Paulista. Eva's son, Pedro Herz, became her partner in the company.

The company expanded to a chain present in several cities in Brazil, such as Brasília, Campinas, Curitiba, Fortaleza, Porto Alegre, Recife, Ribeirão Preto, and Salvador, as well as having a store specialized in comics, videogames and other pop culture goods, called Geek.Etc.Br in São Paulo. On July 19, 2017, Livraria Cultura acquired the operation of Fnac in Brazil without disclosing figures. At the end of the same year the bookstore purchased the online marketplace Estante Virtual.

== Bankruptcy ==
After years of financial losses, which included the closing of physical stores in Rio de Janeiro and the reduction of the workforce, the company filed a request for judicial reorganization on October 24, 2018, seeking to renegotiate its debts with book publishers and other creditors of the company.

On April 13, 2019, the request for judicial reorganization was accepted to restructure the debt of 285 million reais. The creditors accepted a debt restructuring plan for the company, discounting 70% of the debt and granting a 12-year period for the settlement of the debt. Livraria Cultura had 15 stores at the time, in addition to the online store. In September 2020, a new restructuring plan was presented, with rejection from the creditors.

In February 2023, the 2nd Bankruptcy and Judicial Reorganization Court of the Court of Justice of São Paulo decreed the bankruptcy and the freezing of assets of Livraria Cultura. In the decision, the judge of the case justified that there was a breach of the judicial reorganization plan, absence of settlement of labor debts and of creditors, in addition to the lack of commitment to sending documents and signs of fraud in financial transactions carried out by partners of the company.

Its physical units, as well as the online store, were closed in early 2026. In February 2026, the 2nd Bankruptcy and Judicial Reorganization Court of São Paulo confirmed the company's bankruptcy.
