= Conjunto Nacional (São Paulo) =

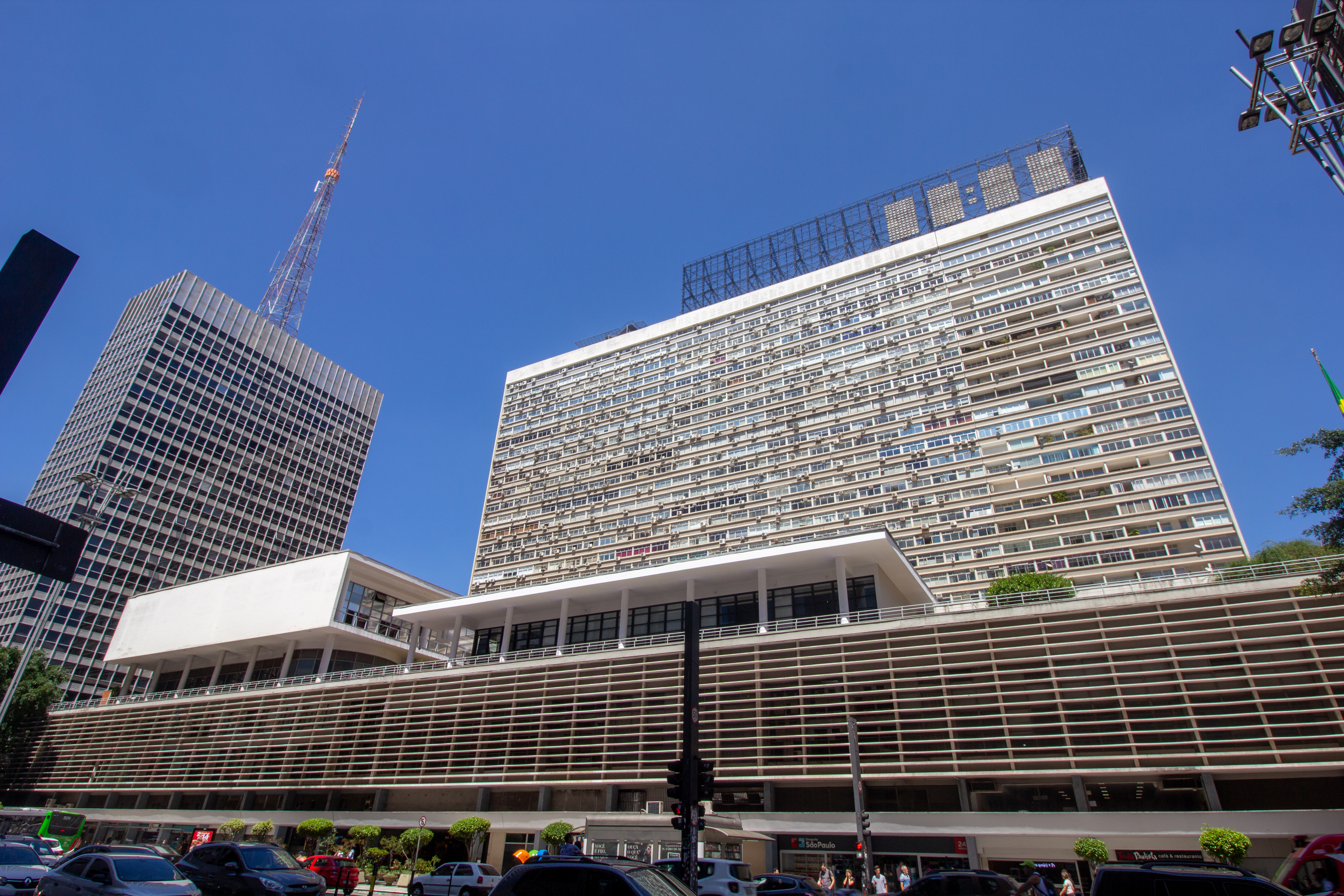
- Conjunto Nacional facade

- Location within São Paulo Location within Brazil

General information
- Type: Commercial centre
- Location: São Paulo, Brazil, Avenida Paulista, 2073
- Coordinates: 23.5589°S 46.6602°W
- Construction started: 1952
- Completed: 1956
- Inaugurated: 1956
- Owner: Grupo Savoy

Height
- Height: 117 m (384 ft)
- Roof: 100 m (330 ft)

Technical details
- Floor count: 25
- Floor area: 111,083.24 m^{2} (1,195,690.0 sq ft)

Design and construction
- Architect: David Libeskind
- Other designers: José Tjurs

Other information
- Number of stores: 66, including 2 movie theaters
- Parking: 712 lots
- Public transit: Consolação

Website
- www.ccn.com.br

Conjunto Nacional is an important building and commercial centre of the city of São Paulo, Brazil. It occupies the block bounded by Avenida Paulista, Rua Augusta, Alameda Santos and Rua Padre João Manuel. The project was authored by architect David Libeskind and is characterized by being one of the first major modern multifunctional buildings deployed in the city of São Paulo.

The complex is characterized by the blending of different uses in the same urban structure: within the building are the following usages: residential, commercial, services and leisure. The relationship between the collective trade usages, leisure-and uses private residences-gives the composition between two parts: in the horizontal part, which occupies the entire block on which to deploy the building-is a shopping arcade, and the vertical part, which occupies only a part of the projection of the terrain are the apartments. The Gallery proposal in the National Assembly became an architectural paradigm for projects of similar buildings in the central area of São Paulo during the 1950s decade. Conjunto Nacional has restaurants, offices and other types of shops and services, plus the largest bookstore in Latin America by built area, the Livraria Cultura. For many years it housed the Cine Astor and the Fasano Restaurant.

In 2005, the building was listed by Condephaat, the State Council of Defense of historical and architectural heritage.

== History ==
The building began construction in 1952, after the decision of the Argentine Jewish businessman José Tjurs to build a large building on Avenida Paulista - which until then had largely residential character. His intention was to bring together in one building a hotel and a shopping center. In the late 50s, as the city did not allow the hotel construction at the site, some modifications to the original design of David Libeskind were implemented.

== Clock ==
The clock of the National Assembly mark the time and the temperature of the city of São Paulo. It is located on top of the Edificio Horsa - Conjunto Nacional, at Avenida Paulista, being visible from several points of the city within a radius of about 5 miles (8.0 km) away.
