= LA to Vegas =

American TV series

- Promotional poster
- Genre: Sitcom
- Created by: Lon Zimmet
- Starring: Kim Matula; Ed Weeks; Nathan Lee Graham; Olivia Macklin; Peter Stormare; Dylan McDermott
- Music by: Duncan Blickenstaff
- Country of origin: United States
- Original language: English
- No. of seasons: 1
- No. of episodes: 15

Production
- Executive producers: Lon Zimmet; Adam McKay; Will Ferrell; Chris Henchy; Steven Levitan; Josh Bycel; Jonathan Fener; Jeff Morton
- Camera setup: Single-camera
- Running time: 22 minutes
- Production companies: Briskets Big Yellow House; Gary Sanchez Productions; Steven Levitan Productions; 20th Century Fox Television

Original release
- Network: Fox
- Release: January 2 – May 1, 2018

LA to Vegas is an American single-camera sitcom that was broadcast on Fox. The series debuted on January 2, 2018, as a midseason entry in the 2017–18 television season. Starring Dylan McDermott, Kim Matula, Ed Weeks, Nathan Lee Graham, Olivia Macklin, and Peter Stormare, the series follows the crew and regular passengers of the Los Angeles to Las Vegas route of budget airline Jackpot Airlines. On January 9, 2018, Fox picked up three additional episodes for a total of 15. On May 21, 2018, Fox canceled the series after one season.

== Premise ==
The series follows the lives of the crew and passengers of a discount airline that makes regular Friday-to-Sunday getaway flights from Los Angeles to Las Vegas. The stories revolve around recurring themes of hope and disappointment.

== Cast and characters ==
=== Main ===
- Kim Matula as Veronica "Ronnie" Messing, a veteran flight attendant for Jackpot Airlines, a budget service operating out of Las Vegas.
- Ed Weeks as Colin McCormack, a British professor of economics at UCLA. He and Ronnie strike up a romance after he separates from his wife. He travels to Las Vegas every weekend to visit his son.
- Nathan Lee Graham as Bernard Jasser, a flamboyant male flight attendant who works alongside Ronnie.
- Olivia Macklin as Nichole Hayes, a professional stripper who uses Jackpot Airlines to fly between Los Angeles and Las Vegas for work.
- Peter Stormare as Artem, an eccentric Russian bookie and gambler, who works as a dentist when he is not gambling in Las Vegas.
- Dylan McDermott as Captain David "Dave" Pratman, who became a pilot for Jackpot after being honorably discharged from the Air Force (thus ruining his dream of being a fighter pilot). He indulges in drugs, alcohol, and women to forget the pain of his failed marriages.

=== Recurring ===
- Amir Talai as Alan, the co-pilot
- Zachary Knighton as Bryan, a chef and Ronnie's boyfriend
- Amy Landecker as Patricia Hayes, Nichole's mother and Captain Dave's love interest
- Kether Donohue as Meghan, Colin's ex-wife.
- Dermot Mulroney as Captain Steve Jasser, one of Pratman's rivals.
- Alison Becker as Caroline, a flight attendant for Jackpot
- Josh Duhamel as Captain Kyle
- Don Johnson as Jack Silver, the CEO of Jackpot Airlines.

== Episodes ==
No.	Title	Directed by	Written by	Original release date	Prod. code	U.S. viewers (millions)
1	"Pilot"	Steven Levitan	Lon Zimmet	January 2, 2018	1LAS01	3.76
Jackpot Airlines flight attendant Ronnie Messing learns during a trip that the coveted job she wanted on Delta's JFK route has gone to her coworker Jill; furious, Ronnie quits her job on the spot. She bonds with Colin McCormack, the British economics professor sitting next to her, and the two attempt to have sex before being interrupted by Captain Dave. The experience convinces her to backtrack on her decision but not before learning that he's married. Frequent flyer Artem, a professional bookie, tries to make money betting on the other passengers, while Captain Dave, struggling with his failed marriage, keeps trying to pick up women to Ronnie's disgust. However, he redeems himself by using Muay Thai to subdue an angry passenger. Colin, who turns out to be separated from his wife, leaves her behind in Vegas for a chance to start a relationship with Ronnie.
2	"The Yips and the Dead"	Steven Levitan	Lon Zimmet	January 9, 2018	1LAS02	2.65
Ronnie decides at the last second to break off a date with Colin, putting their relationship in jeopardy. During a flight, an elderly passenger sitting next to Nicole suddenly passes away, and protocol dictates that the body cannot be disposed of until the plane lands. Despite efforts to cover up the death, Nicole accidentally reveals it and incites panic. A more serious crisis emerges when Captain Dave finds himself unable to land the plane due to a nervous tic and, out of professional pride, refuses to let his co-pilot Alan take over. When Alan knocks himself unconscious by tripping over the body, Ronnie enters the cockpit and persuades Dave that his condition is all in his head, while Artem rallies the passengers to celebrate that they are still alive. The flight lands successfully, and Ronnie tries to apologize to Colin; he informs her that whatever they had won't work. Ronnie reluctantly agrees and sulks off to get drunk.
3	"Two and a Half Pilots"	Beth McCarthy-Miller	Lon Zimmet	January 16, 2018	1LAS03	2.77
After Captain Dave breaks his wrist, his nemesis Captain Steve is brought in to fly in his place. Almost immediately, Steve's demanding nature clashes with Ronnie and Bernard's laid-back behavior. An argument between Steve and Dave eventually comes to blows, because Steve forced Dave to sit in the cabin, Dave is not considered a pilot, and Steve is arrested for assaulting a passenger. Before Captain Dave can reassume his role as pilot, Captain Kyle is called in as a second replacement. Meanwhile, Colin learns that the play palace he booked for his son's birthday party has been shut down, so Artem and Nicole step in to transform the Grapefroots strip club into something slightly more suitable for young children.
4	"The Affair"	Linda Mendoza	Alison Bennett	January 23, 2018	1LAS04	2.61
Jackpot Airlines passengers contend with new, restrictive fees that lock down everything from overhead bins to bathroom access. Ronnie notices Dean, a frequent flier, with an unfamiliar woman and suspects him of cheating on his wife. Against the advice of others, she confronts them, earning the ire of the rest of the plane and prompting Dean to berate her. Colin attempts to make Dean apologize, and after the two get physical, Dean reveals that he is an unmarried air marshal on vacation with his girlfriend and takes Colin into custody. Captain Dave flirts with air traffic controller Gwen and eventually asks her out, only to be met and chastised by her supervisor upon landing.
5	"The Fellowship of the Bear"	Don Scardino	Mathew Harawitz	February 6, 2018	1LAS05	2.52
Captain Dave insults his plane's cleanup crew, prompting them to expose the plane to odors so foul that the passengers must disembark. As he and Bernard attempt to combat the smells, Dave realizes his insensitivity and buys pastries as an apology, only to give them to a similar-looking crew by mistake. Ronnie and Colin scour the Las Vegas airport and the TSA confiscated items vault looking for his son's favorite stuffed bear, only to watch as a bomb squad disposes of it. After seeing how distraught this makes Colin, Ronnie offers his son a beloved stuffed animal of her own as a replacement. Artem teaches Nicole how to play poker, only to be taken aback when she immediately begins winning.
6	"#PilotFight"	Eva Longoria	Ian Brennan	February 27, 2018	1LAS07	2.36
Suffering from a toothache, Ronnie visits a dentist's office and immediately flees when she learns the dentist is Artem. Captain Dave and a disgraced Captain Steve reignite their rivalry and challenge each other to a fistfight. As Bernard unsuccessfully tries to stop the conflict, Nichole collects bets from airport employees and travelers, Colin trains Dave to box, and Artem performs an emergency procedure on Ronnie's tooth. Just as the fight begins, Ronnie breaks things up and convinces the two to put their differences aside. Dave helps Steve become reinstated as a pilot, but they quickly begin fighting again when they realize only one of them can be the captain for their return flight.
7	"Things to Do in Vegas When You're Grounded"	Jeffrey Walker	Josh Bycel & Jonathan Fener	March 6, 2018	1LAS08	2.08
Jackpot grounds Captain Dave's plane in Las Vegas, and everyone takes advantage of their free evening. Ronnie and Nichole hit the town on a double date in a fancy restaurant, with two magicians who constantly perform tricks. Colin receives his divorce papers, and Captain Dave decides to organize a "guy's night" with Artem, Bernard, and Alan joining in. They pre-game on the plane and get stranded there after the jetway crew pulls the plane away from the gate. After more drinks, Colin realizes he still has feelings for Ronnie, and the rest of the guys convince him to act on them. Colin finally gets off the plane and rushes to meet Ronnie, finding her just as she is leaving with the restaurant's owner.
8	"Parking Lot B"	Fred Savage	Danielle Sanchez-Witzel	March 13, 2018	1LAS06	2.05
Ronnie gets evicted from her apartment after accidentally lighting its garbage chute on fire. She briefly rooms with Bernard, whose numerous rules quickly get the better of her. She then stays with Captain Dave in Parking Lot B, a trailer park with a music festival vibe and quirky residents. She overstays her welcome there by letting loose too aggressively, and the community kicks her out. While all this happens, Dave loses a bet with Artem and lies about his whereabouts to avoid paying his debt. Ronnie eventually apologizes to Dave and moves back in with Bernard to help teach herself discipline. Colin receives poor reviews from his students and enlists Bernard and Nichole to help analyze his job performance, which dramatically improves after he starts using stripping techniques to maintain his students' attention.
9	"Overbooked"	Jaffar Mahmood	Margee Magee	March 20, 2018	1LAS09	2.17
Jackpot overbooks a flight to Vegas on the same day as a big MMA fight, and the crew must convince four passengers to disembark. Once food and beverage service stops, Nichole begins selling a stockpile of snacks at exorbitant prices. Bryan surprises Ronnie by attempting to stage their first date on the flight, but the demands of contending with the angry passengers prevent her from spending any time with him. Artem is seated next to a ventriloquist, whose rude dummy eventually sends him into a rage, and the ensuing fight vacates their three seats. A dejected Bryan offers to give up his seat as well, and the plane can finally take off. After landing in Vegas, Colin offers to have drinks with a frustrated Ronnie, but Bryan appears and whisks her off on a proper date first.
10	"Bernard's Birthday"	John Riggi	Jen D'Angelo	March 27, 2018	1LAS10	1.98
Nichole's mother Patricia, an uptight politician, joins her in Vegas on the same weekend as Bernard's lavish Bible-themed birthday party, which the regular Jackpot crew attends. Never having told her mother about her profession, Nichole attempts to hide this by pretending to date Captain Dave. While Bernard struggles to impress the party-goers, Colin connects with a woman who is similar to his ex-wife. Their constant flirting makes Ronnie jealous, and her efforts to break them up cause her to neglect Bryan. Dave eventually explains that his relationship with Nichole is a sham and convinces Patricia to go on a date with him. After Dave reveals this, Nichole continues to save face with her mother by pretending to date Ronnie instead. Colin almost goes home with his new romantic interest but returns to the party after discovering her poor Lyft rating. As the festivities conclude, Ronnie apologizes to Bryan for her absence, and the Jackpot crew inadvertently recreates The Last Supper.
11	"Jack Silver"	Linda Mendoza	Jason Berger & Amina Munir	April 3, 2018	1LAS11	1.96
Jack Silver, the CEO of Jackpot Airlines, joins the crew on a flight to Vegas as a PR stunt. Colin brags that he has never lost a bet, so Artem and Nichole bet him that he cannot say fewer than 150 words before they land. While fighting over which of them is the more dedicated employee, Ronnie and Bernard drop Jack's lunch but clean it off and serve it anyway. A teenage boy films this, expecting to go viral with the footage, and Ronnie fears that she will lose her job. While visiting Captain Dave in the cockpit, Jack learns that he is to be indicted upon landing, so he hijacks the plane and attempts to fly to Mexico. Ronnie overrides Jack's lock on the cockpit door and, after Jack escapes by pretending to jump out of the plane, everyone lands safely in Vegas. Nichole convinces the boy to delete his footage of Ronnie by offering to pretend to be his girlfriend. Artem is overjoyed to find that his long-standing cold streak is over thanks to Colin's losing their bet, so he forgives Colin's debts.
12	"Training Day"	Jim Hensz	Lon Zimmet, Jess Pineda & Jeremy Roth	April 10, 2018	1LAS12	2.15
Ronnie, Bernard, and Captain Dave attend Jackpot's yearly training seminar. Unlike the booze-fueled banger of years past, the seminar is straight-laced and orderly thanks to customer complaints about the LA to Vegas crew. Dave makes inroads with the younger pilots by telling embarrassing stories about Ronnie and Bernard's on-duty behavior. These stories spread around the seminar, and the two are suspended indefinitely. Thanks to drugged food from the Jackpot crew in Reno, chaos breaks out on the flight home that the younger crew and pilots cannot contain. With Dave helping from the cockpit, Ronnie and Bernard get the situation under control, and Jackpot shows its gratitude by lifting their suspensions. Meanwhile, Colin, Artem, and Nichole stake out a slot machine in the Vegas airport that's due to pay out a huge jackpot. After luring an old woman away from it and enduring a lengthy power outage, they repeatedly play the machine to no avail; soon after they give up, someone else wins the jackpot.
13	"The Dinner Party"	Melissa Kosar	Seth Raab & Nicholas Darrow	April 17, 2018	1LAS13	1.95
To entertain Bryan on his trip to Los Angeles, Ronnie hosts a dinner party at Bernard's apartment and invites the Jackpot crew. Captain Dave arrives with Patricia, hoping to make the night their first official date, but she spends most of the party working. Colin attends with his Uber driver as his date, but her accommodating demeanor makes him wonder if she still considers him a passenger. Artem insists that Nichole read his new action-musical screenplay and is hurt when she criticizes it. With the party underway, Ronnie realizes she didn't order the prepared meals she thought she did; as she scrambles to cook dinner from scratch, the demands of hosting cause her to lash out at everyone. Bryan consoles Ronnie after her outburst, and the two order Taco Bell as a replacement meal. As the party winds down, Bryan asks Ronnie to move in with him in Vegas. Colin hooks up with his date, and Dave breaks up with Patricia after they can't agree on how serious their relationship is.
14	"Captain Dave's on a Roll"	Jeffrey Walker	Josh Bycel & Jonathan Fener	April 24, 2018	1LAS14	2.05
Captain Dave's breakup has trapped him in a cynical funk. Artem attempts to cheer him up by bringing him to a casino to play craps, where he begins a remarkable winning streak. With Dave away from the airport, the Jackpot plane cannot take off, and gate agent Caroline demands that he return. While Bernard and Alan stall Caroline, Ronnie and Nichole race off to the casino to find Dave with a drunken Colin who has finally embraced Vegas. Surrounded by an adoring crowd, Dave is buoyed by their love and agrees to return to the airport, where their plane is further delayed by Caroline and Alan's hooking up in the galley. After weighing her decision, Ronnie agrees to move in with Bryan, while Dave plans to buy a ring and propose to Patricia.
15	"The Proposal"	Linda Mendoza	Lon Zimmet	May 1, 2018	1LAS15	1.70
Jackpot loses Captain Dave's bag with his engagement ring still inside, putting his proposal plans in jeopardy. Fed up with his lengthy divorce proceedings, Colin tries to help Dave by visiting Meghan at her magic show and demanding that she return their old engagement ring. Ronnie prepares to move in with Bryan, but a second-chance job interview lands her a position on a Delta flight from L.A. to New York City. This forces her to choose between her relationship and her career, a decision made more complex when Colin spontaneously kisses her. On the night of the proposal, Nichole reveals that she stole Dave's bag to stop him from marrying her mother, but ultimately realizes that his decision is not hers to make. Dave backs out of the proposal at the last moment, with Nichole assisting him by finally telling her mother that she is a stripper. Much to Colin's shock, Dave rebounds by spending a passionate weekend in L.A. with Meghan. After getting kicked out of her mother's house, Nichole moves in with Bernard, and Ronnie takes a flight to Hong Kong to figure out what she really wants.

== Reception ==
=== Critical response ===
On review aggregator Rotten Tomatoes, the series has an approval rating of 56% based on 16 reviews, with an average rating of 5.84/10. The website's critical consensus reads, "Refreshingly lewd humor and funny, relatable characters are crammed into LA to Vegas alongside pacing problems and a dearth of punchlines, leaving this sitcom's high-flying potential stuck in an amiable holding pattern." On Metacritic, the season has a weighted average score of 43 out of 100, based on 13 critics, indicating "mixed or average reviews".

=== Ratings ===
Viewership and ratings per episode of LA to Vegas
No.	Title	Air date	Rating/share (18–49)	Viewers (millions)	DVR (18–49)	DVR viewers (millions)	Total (18–49)	Total viewers (millions)
1	"Pilot"	January 2, 2018	1.1/4	3.76	—N/a	—N/a	—N/a	—N/a
2	"The Yips and the Dead"	January 9, 2018	0.8/3	2.65	0.6	1.72	1.4	4.37
3	"Two and a Half Pilots"	January 16, 2018	0.9/3	2.77	0.6	1.50	1.5	4.27
4	"The Affair"	January 23, 2018	0.8/3	2.61	0.6	1.45	1.4	4.06
5	"The Fellowship of the Bear"	February 6, 2018	0.8/3	2.52	—N/a	1.21	—N/a	3.73
6	"#PilotFight"	February 27, 2018	0.7/3	2.36	—N/a	—N/a	—N/a	—N/a
7	"Things to Do in Vegas When You're Grounded"	March 6, 2018	0.7/3	2.08	—N/a	—N/a	—N/a	—N/a
8	"Parking Lot B"	March 13, 2018	0.7/3	2.05	—N/a	—N/a	—N/a	—N/a
9	"Overbooked"	March 20, 2018	0.7/3	2.17	—N/a	—N/a	—N/a	—N/a
10	"Bernard's Birthday"	March 27, 2018	0.6/2	1.98	0.5	—N/a	1.1	—N/a
11	"Jack Silver"	April 3, 2018	0.7/3	1.96	TBD	TBD	TBD	TBD
12	"Training Day"	April 10, 2018	0.7/3	2.15	TBD	TBD	TBD	TBD
13	"The Dinner Party"	April 17, 2018	0.6/2	1.95	TBD	TBD	TBD	TBD
14	"Captain Dave's On a Roll"	April 24, 2018	0.7/3	2.05	TBD	TBD	TBD	TBD
15	"The Proposal"	May 1, 2018	0.5/2	1.70	TBD	TBD	TBD	TBD
