= Winnetka =

Winnetka may refer to:

One of the following places in the United States:

- Winnetka, Los Angeles
- Winnetka, Illinois
  - Winnetka station in Winnetka, Illinois
- Winnetka Heights, Dallas, Texas

Or to the following educational experiment:

- The Winnetka Plan
