= Michael Hsu Rosen =

American actor and dancer

- Born: New York City, United States
- Education: Yale University; School of American Ballet; Professional Children's School

Michael Hsu Rosen is an American actor and dancer best known for his starring roles as Ben in the Netflix series Glamorous, Jayden in the Netflix series Pretty Smart and Nabil in the Netflix series Tiny Pretty Things. Rosen is also known for his supporting roles in Presumed Innocent on Apple TV and The Sex Lives of College Girls on HBO Max among others. He has appeared in films such as Lavender, The Only Living Pickpocket in New York and After Class as well as numerous times on stage, notably starring in the Broadway revivals of Torch Song and West Side Story and in Nikolai and Others at Lincoln Center.

== Early life and education ==
Rosen was born and raised in New York City on the Upper West Side. He attended Ethical Culture Fieldston School, as well as the Professional Children's School. He trained for nine years at the School of American Ballet and matriculated at Yale University before withdrawing to pursue acting full-time.

== Career ==
While in high school, Rosen performed with the New York City Ballet and made his Broadway debut at seventeen in the 2009 revival of West Side Story. He later returned to Broadway in revivals of On the Town and Harvey Fierstein's Torch Song.

Rosen has appeared in such television shows as Looking, Jessica Jones, The Good Doctor and Elsbeth as well as earned main roles in Netflix's Glamorous, Tiny Pretty Things and Pretty Smart, Hulu's Monsterland, HBO Max's The Sex Lives of College Girls and Apple TV's Presumed Innocent.

== Filmography ==
=== Film ===
Year	Title	Director	Notes
2019	Lavender	Matthew Puccini	2019 Sundance Film Festival
2019	After Class	Daniel Schechter	Tribeca Festival
2023	Daughter of the Bride	Annette Haywood-Carter	
2026	The Only Living Pickpocket in New York	Noah Segan	2026 Sundance Film Festival
2026	Callback	Matthew Puccini	2026 Sundance Film Festival
2026	Before I Do	Gary Jaffe	Frameline Film Festival

=== Television ===
Year	Title	Role	Notes
2014	Taxi Brooklyn	Diego	Episode: "Black Widow"
2015	Live from Lincoln Center	Performer	Episode: "Sinatra: Voice for a Century"
2016	Looking	Jimmy	TV Movie
2019	Jessica Jones	Laurent Lyonne	Recurring role
2020	Monsterland	Josh Hammond	Episode: "New York, New York"
2020	Tiny Pretty Things	Nabil	Series regular
2021	The Good Doctor	Leo	Episode: "Spilled Milk"
2021	Pretty Smart	Jayden	Series regular
2023	Glamorous	Ben	Series regular
2024–2025	The Sex Lives of College Girls	Brian	Major recurring role
2025	Elsbeth	Cole Campbell	Episode: "Unalive and Well"

== Stage ==
=== Broadway ===
Year	Title	Role	Director
2009–2011	West Side Story	Chino	Arthur Laurents
2014–2015	On the Town	Ensemble, u/s Gabey (performed)	John Rando
2018–2019	Torch Song	Alan	Moisés Kaufman

=== Off-Broadway ===
Title	Role	Theater	Director
Bus Stop	Bo Decker	Classic Stage Company	Jack Cummings III
Do I Hear a Waltz?	Vito di Rossi	Encores! at New York City Center	Evan Cabnet
Dot	Fidel	Vineyard Theatre	Susan Stroman
Nikolai and the Others	Nicholas Magallanes	Lincoln Center	David Cromer
