= Palm Springs International Festival of Short Films =

Annual film festival in California, US

Palm Springs International ShortFest
- Official poster
- Location: Palm Springs, California, U.S.
- Most recent: June 23–29, 2026
- Hosted by: Palm Springs International Film Society
- Language: International
- Website: www.psfilmfest.org

The Palm Springs International Festival of Short Films (a.k.a. Palm Springs International ShortFest) held annually in Palm Springs, California is the largest film festival for short films in the United States.

The Palm Springs International Festival of Short Films takes place across seven days each June, showing more than 350 short films every year, and hosting a Short Film Market with over 3,000 new short films annually. It also presents a three-day program of seminars, master classes, panels and roundtable discussions with free admission for all filmmaking and industry guests. An AMPAS qualifying Festival, PSISF has hosted 97 short films in its 19-year history that went on to secure Oscar nominations in the short film categories.

The Festival of Short Films is a spin-off of the Palm Springs International Film Festival (PSIFF) that takes place each January.

In 2021 the main PSIFF festival was not held due to the COVID-19 pandemic, but the ShortFest went ahead on June 22–28.

== Festival editions ==
The 28th edition of the festival was held from June 21 to 27, 2022.

The 29th edition of the festival was held from June 20 to 26, 2023.

The 30th edition of the festival was held from June 18 to 24, 2024.

The 31st edition of the festival was held from June 24 to 30, 2025.

The 32nd edition of the festival was held from June 23 to 29, 2026.

== Awards and prizes ==
The following awards and prizes are presented in the festival:

- Academy-Award Qualifying Awards: (first place only)
  - Best of the Festival Award
  - Best Animated Short
  - Best Documentary Short
  - Best Live-Action Short Over 15 Minutes
  - Best Live-Action Short 15 Minutes and Under
- Special Jury Awards:
  - Best International Short
  - Best U.S. Short
  - Desert Views Local Jury Award
  - Young Cineastes Award
  - Kids' Choice Award
  - Best Comedy Short
  - Best LGBTQ+ Short
  - Best Midnight Short
- Student Short Awards:
  - Best Student Animated Short
  - Best Student Documentary Short
  - Best Student International Short
  - Best Student U.S. Short
- Audience Awards:
  - Best Animated Short
  - Best Live-Action Short
