= Black Country Disco =

Tom Aspaul's Debut Album

Studio album by Tom Aspaul
- Released: 14 September 2020
- Recorded: 2019–2020
- Genre: Pop; disco; dance-pop
- Length: 28:24
- Label: 1609 (Self-released)
- Producer: Gil Lewis; Tom Aspaul

Tom Aspaul chronology
Black Country Disco (2020)	Black Country Discothèque (2021)

Singles from Black Country Disco
- 1. "Traces" Released: 18 October 2019; 2. "Close 2 Me" Released: 8 November 2019; 3. "W.M." Released: 27 March 2020; 4. "Tender" Released: 26 June 2020; 5. "01902" Released: 11 September 2020

Black Country Disco is the debut studio album by British singer-songwriter Tom Aspaul, self-released on 14 September 2020. Following his previous mixtapes, Revelation (2015) and Lamentations (2018), the record received critical acclaim, particularly for its cohesion, songwriting and themes of heartbreak and nostalgia.

The album is a concept album with a specific narrative structure, sonically inspired by disco from the 70s and 80s and primarily produced and co-written with Israeli producer and songwriter Gil Lewis. Described by Aspaul himself as being a "break-up album, written entirely in sequence", he lyrically explores the end of a long-term relationship, leaving London and returning to his hometown of Wolverhampton in the Black Country after 15 years away.

Critics compared the album's sound to contemporary artists such as Jessie Ware and Róisín Murphy, who also released disco-inspired LPs during 2020, commenting that Black Country Disco was part of a "pandemic disco revival". An independent release, the record was included amongst several year-end lists and touted by one critic as "a solid contender for album of the year."

Black Country Disco was succeeded by its remix album, Black Country Discothèque, released on 16 April 2021, featuring collaborations with Kim Wilde, MNEK, Bright Light Bright Light and Brendan Maclean.

== Background ==
Primarily known as a songwriter for artists such as Celeste, Kylie Minogue and Louise, Tom Aspaul has been releasing his own music since debut single "Indiana" in 2013. A series of "life changing events" forced Aspaul to leave behind the music industry in London and return to his native Wolverhampton. The move kickstarted a series of songs and demos and it was here that the bulk of Black Country Disco was conceived, written and recorded.

Named for an industrial area of the West Midlands, the album's lyrics contain several tongue-in-cheek local references, with mentions of Wolverhampton's area-code, its town motto and both the M6 motorway and West Midlands Metro that run through the city - the latter of which agreed to allow Aspaul to film at one of its stations.

== Composition ==
A year-long collaboration back and forth with London-based producer Gil Lewis - the album's track list corresponds to the order in which the song's demos were written. The record is "split evenly in half" - the first half exploring the terminal breakdown of Aspaul's relationship and the second half celebrating his move back to the West Midlands. Inspired by Madonna's 2005 album Confessions on a Dancefloor, the album's two halves are sequenced and blended so that they are played almost continuously without any gaps.

The majority of the album is produced by Lewis - however in order to finish the project and due to the COVID-19 pandemic, Aspaul recorded his vocals remotely and produced the final two tracks alone - becoming his first production credits. Aspaul and Lewis' production touches on Italo-disco, 80s synthpop, Giorgio Moroder and other classic disco references.

Lyrically the album has been described as "pinballing between heartbreak and revivification" with Aspaul's "irrepressible queer sensibility" tackling themes that "aren’t necessarily subjects taken on in music". Whilst also dealing with heavy subject matter, the record is noted for its light-hearted pop culture nods, including references to Victoria Beckham song titles and quotes from the 2015 horror film - The Witch.

Aspaul has described the album as "cathartic" and "incredibly daunting", stating that it represents "an intense period of change" as well as enabling him to "appreciate and learn to love the Midlands all over again."

== Release ==
The album's name and logo were announced and revealed on 14 September 2019, exactly one year before its eventual release in 2020. The pre-sale for the record's crowdfunded vinyl commenced on 14 July 2020, specifically chosen for being 'Black Country Day', which takes place on the same date.

Four official singles and one promotional single were "drip-fed" throughout the year in the run up to the album's release. Inspired by Lady Gaga's third album ARTPOP, a ten-minute short film, Black Country Disco: The Movie premiered October 26, 2020, including segments from three album cuts, namely "W.M.", "01902" and "Tender". The film was directed by Sam Taylor-Edwards, featuring actor Omari Douglas and shot in and around the Black Country.

The album's consistent visual identity and retro aesthetic has been particularly praised. The artwork draws inspiration from "classic record sleeves and film posters from the 70s" by artists such as Drew Struzan and is a hand-painted collage of Aspaul imposed over the Black Country skyline, incorporating several existing and former Wolverhampton landmarks. The Black Country Disco logo pays tribute to "the region’s rock heritage", specifically Birmingham bands such as Black Sabbath and Electric Light Orchestra.

Aspaul announced Black Country Disco: The Book, published by Polari Press, documenting the conception, creation and release of the album in 2021. Later the same year, Tom embarked on his first sold-out UK headline tour, The Revenge Body Tour, in support of the album.

== Critical reception ==
Professional ratings
Review scores
Source	Rating
Albumism	5/5 stars
God Is In The TV	10/10
Herald Sun	4/5 stars

Black Country Disco received critical acclaim upon release. GQ described the album as "a deliciously swift, utterly luscious dance-friendly chamber opera". The Guardian writer Michael Cragg named Black Country Disco and its fourth single, "Tender" amongst the "albums and tracks of the year 2020", respectively. Writing for Gay Times, critic Sam Damshenas thought that Aspaul had "created the queer disco album of the year" and "one of the best pop albums of 2020".

Herald Sun writer Cameron Adams said Aspaul's "debut neatly slips into the current disco revival", comparing it to Donna Summer and describing the song "Tender" as "the kind of sad pop the Pet Shop Boys excel in". In a five-star review for Albumism, Quentin Harrison says "to call this album anything other than a masterpiece would be grossly criminal". Sophie Williams named the album a "solid contender for album of the year", in her review for Stereoboard, describing it as "built on ironclad hooks, razor-sharp songwriting". Nic Kelly from Project U praised the album for being "exciting, brilliantly written, confessional pop music with a disco twist".

In a piece for The Forty-Five, El Hunt included Aspaul amongst artists "shaking up the pop landscape in 2020 and beyond", such as Rina Sawayama and Ava Max, writing that Black Country Disco is "easily one of the best albums of the year – even if it doesn’t always get shouted about with the rest of the pop squad."

=== Year-end lists ===
Black Country Disco on year-end lists
Publication	List	Rank	Ref.
Albumism	Albumism's 100 Best Albums of 2020	40	
Albumism	Quentin Harrison's 10 Favorite Albums of 2020	3	
Albumism	Mark J. Marraccini's 10 Favorite Albums of 2020	9	
God Is In The TV	Albums of The Year for 2020	30	
The Guardian	Alim Kheraj's Top Albums of 2020	8	
The Guardian	Michael Cragg's Top Albums of 2020	20	
Gay Times	The 20 best albums of 2020 by LGBTQ+ artists	—N/a	
Uproxx	The 2020 Uproxx Music Critics Poll	581	
Uproxx	Steven J. Horowitz's Picks	10	

== Track listing ==
Black Country Disco – LP, cassette & digital version
No.	Title	Writer(s)	Producer(s)	Length
1.	"Black Country Intro"	Tom Aspaul; Gil Lewis	Aspaul; Lewis	0:56
2.	"Close 2 Me"	Aspaul; Lewis	Lewis	2:46
3.	"Carnelian"	Aspaul; Lewis	Lewis	2:48
4.	"Tender"	Aspaul; Lewis	Lewis	3:08
5.	"Traces"	Aspaul; Lewis	Lewis	3:16
6.	"Euston"	Aspaul; Lewis; Clare Maguire; Finlay Robson	Aspaul; Lewis	1:07
7.	"W.M."	Aspaul; Lewis; Maguire; Robson	Lewis	3:14
8.	"Dead Already (Save Yourself)"	Aspaul; Lewis	Lewis	2:49
9.	"01902"	Aspaul	Aspaul	5:27
10.	"Black Country Disco"	Aspaul	Aspaul	2:52
Total length:				28:24

Black Country Disco – CD version (bonus track)
No.	Title	Writer(s)	Producer(s)	Length
11.	"W.M. (Midland Metro Extended Version)"	Aspaul; Lewis; Maguire; Robson	Lewis	7:15
Total length:				35:38

Black Country Disco – Bandcamp version (bonus track)
No.	Title	Writer(s)	Producer(s)	Length
12.	"Everyday"	Noddy Holder; Jim Lea	Lewis	2:54
Total length:				38:32

== Black Country Discothèque ==
Black Country Discothèque

Remix album by Tom Aspaul
- Released: 16 April 2021
- Length: 68:21
- Label: 1609
- Producer: Tom Ashlee; Hen; Bright Light Bright Light; Eric Spike; MNEK; Stats; Initial Talk; lau.ra; Bronze Avery; Max Lawrence; Funk LeBlanc; Tom Aspaul; Country Club Martini Crew

Tom Aspaul chronology
Black Country Disco (2020)	Black Country Discothèque (2021)	Life in Plastic (2022)

Singles from Black Country Discothèque
- 1. "The Program" Released: January 27, 2021; 2. "Tender 2" Released: February 24, 2020; 3. "Traces (MNEK Remix)" Released: April 13, 2021

A remix album, titled Black Country Discothèque, featuring collaborations with Kim Wilde, MNEK, Bright Light Bright Light and Brendan Maclean was announced for release on 16 April 2021, preceded by the singles "The Program" (with Funk LeBlanc & Madeleine Wood), "Tender 2" (with Funk LeBlanc) and "Traces" (MNEK Remix), respectively.

A Soviet inspired music video for "The Program", directed by Dan Hett and Omari Douglas, was released 19 February.

Black Country Discothèque – Digital version
No.	Title	Length
1.	"Black Country Intro" (Tom Ashlee Remix)	1:30
2.	"Close 2 Me (feat. Foxgluvv)" (Hen Remix)	3:26
3.	"Carnelian" (Bright Light Bright Light Remix)	3:57
4.	"Tender" (Eric Spike Remix)	3:04
5.	"Traces" (MNEK Remix)	3:54
6.	"Euston" (Stats Remix)	4:43
7.	"W.M. (feat. Kim Wilde)" (Initial Talk Remix)	3:56
8.	"Dead Already (Save Yourself)" (lau.ra Remix)	3:47
9.	"01902 (feat. Bronze Avery)" (Bronze Avery Remix)	3:12
10.	"Black Country Disco" (Max Lawrence Remix)	4:12
11.	"The Program (with Funk LeBlanc & Madeleine Wood)"	3:42
12.	"Tender 2 (with Funk LeBlanc)"	3:40
13.	"Wanna Love U Boy (feat. Michael Medrano)"	3:16
14.	"Prime Time (feat. Brendan Maclean)"	3:12
15.	"B.C.D. Megamix (with Country Club Martini Crew)"	4:27
16.	"W.M." (Midland Metro Extended Mix)	7:15
17.	"01902" (Deliciously Extended Mix)	7:08
Total length:		68:21

Notes

- "Wanna Love U Boy" (featuring Michael Medrano) is a cover of "Wanna Love You Girl" (featuring Pharrell Williams) by Robin Thicke.
- "Prime Time" (featuring Brendan Maclean) is a cover of "Prime Time" by the Tubes from the album Remote Control.

== Release history ==
Release formats
Date	Format	Version	Label
14 September 2020	Digital download; streaming; vinyl; cassette; CD	Black Country Disco	1609
16 April 2021	Digital download; streaming; vinyl	Black Country Discothèque	1609
