= Zane Phillips =

American actor (born 1993)

- Born: November 25, 1993 (age 32); Denver, Colorado, U.S.
- Education: Elon University (BFA)
- Occupations: Actor; model
- Years active: 2014–present

Zane Phillips (born November 25, 1993) is an American actor and model.

== Life and education ==
Phillips was born in Denver, Colorado. During his middle school years, he moved to Fredericksburg, Texas, where he became involved in community theatre. He graduated from Elon University in 2015. Phillips is gay, and splits his time between New York City and Los Angeles. On August 7, 2023, he announced over Instagram that he is in a relationship with Froy Gutierrez.

== Career ==
In 2021, Phillips had a recurring role in the fourth season of the CW fantasy television series Legacies. In 2022, he appeared in Fire Island, a romantic comedy film inspired by the novel Pride and Prejudice by Jane Austen, playing an "attractive, sex-positive island visitor" based on George Wickham. He starred in the 2023 Netflix comedy drama series Glamorous alongside Kim Cattrall and Miss Benny. He described his character, Chad, as "a send up of that classic '80s and '90s trope of the blonde, rich douchebag". Phillips received the Human Rights Campaign (HRC) Visibility Award at the 2024 HRC Utah Dinner. Between August and September 2024, Phillips starred with Elizabeth Lail in an off-Broadway production of Gage Tarlton's Pretty Perfect Lives at the Flea Theatre. In 2024, he also made a guest appearance in the final season of Good Trouble as Jay.

== Acting credits ==
=== Film ===
Year	Title	Role	Notes	Ref.
2022	Fire Island	Dex	Based on George Wickham	

=== Television ===
Year	Title	Role	Notes	Ref.
2016	Madam Secretary	Young Guy No. 2	Episode: "Sea Change"	
2021–2022	Legacies	Ben	Recurring role; 11 episodes	
2022	Partner Track	Hunter Reed	6 episodes	
2023	Glamorous	Chad Addison	Main role; 10 episodes	
2024	Good Trouble	Jay	6 episodes	
2025	Mid-Century Modern	Mason	2 episodes	
2025	RuPaul's Drag Race All Stars	Himself	Episode: "The Golden Bitchelor"	
2025	Loot	Maro Gold	3 episodes	
2026	RuPaul's Drag Race	Himself	2 episodes	
2026	The Comeback	Dean	Recurring role; 6 episodes	

=== Music videos ===
Year	Title	Artist(s)	Ref.
2023	"Also It's Christmas"	Matt Rogers	
2024	"Heatwave"	Bronze Avery	

=== Theatre ===
Year	Title	Role	Notes	Ref.
2024	Pretty Perfect Lives	Tucker	The Flea Theater	
2026	The Fantasticks	El Gallo	Broadway, Hayes Theater	
