= My Secret Santa =

American romantic comedy film

- Release poster
- Directed by: Mike Rohl
- Screenplay by: Carley Smale; Ron Oliver
- Story by: Carley Smale
- Produced by: Howard Braunstein; Alexander Braunstein
- Starring: Alexandra Breckenridge; Ryan Eggold; Madison MacIsaac; Barry Levy; Adam Beauchesne; Diana Maria Riva; Tia Mowry
- Cinematography: Michael Blundell
- Edited by: Daria Ellerman
- Music by: Matthew Rodgers
- Production companies: Netflix Studios; Howard Braunstein Films
- Distributed by: Netflix
- Release date: December 3, 2025
- Running time: 92 minutes
- Country: United States
- Language: English

My Secret Santa is a 2025 American Christmas romantic comedy film directed by Mike Rohl, written by Carley Smale and Ron Oliver from a story by Smale, and starring Alexandra Breckenridge, Ryan Eggold, Madison MacIsaac, Barry Levy, Adam Beauchesne, Diana Maria Riva, and Tia Mowry.

The film tells the story of a desperate single mother who loses her job at a cookie company and resorts to disguising herself as an elderly man to get hired as a local ski resort's Santa Claus for the holidays. Things become complicated when the new resort manager begins to suspect her and she falls in love with the owner's handsome son.

The film was released on Netflix on December 3, 2025.

== Plot ==
Clotz' Cookies downsizes Taylor Jacobson just before Christmas. Although overdue on rent, she hopes her daughter Zoey can join a local snowboarding class. Taylor's brother Eric and partner Kenny discover Sun Peak ski resort employees get a discount.

Desperate, the single mother applies at the resort. Although not hiring, Taylor overhears marketing VP Natasha mentioning their dire need for a Santa as theirs retired. Taylor convinces Eric and Kenny to disguise her as an elderly man to apply.

Matthew Layne is the resort owner Robert's son, so is acting general manager to compensate for recklessness in Italy, as the previous one left abruptly. Both Matthew and Taylor arrive late to the interview. As no-one else is convincing, Natasha pushes Matthew to OK "Hugh", whose disguise fools them.

Afterwards, speaking privately with "Hugh", Matthew senses they met before. Taylor actually had met him earlier in a used record shop. Matthew tried to ask her out, after recognizing her from her teen rock band, 'The Screaming Kittens'.

Taylor's building superintendent/neighbor Doralee is suddenly friendly and forgiving of the late rent. Hoping to get on her good side, the lonely Doralee is attracted to 'Hugh'. She plans to seduce the unmarried older man, who Taylor claims is her visiting father.

At the resort, Matthew reprimands "Hugh" for his interaction with kids. He is getting negative buzz for discouraging them from requesting expensive gifts. "Hugh" explains he is helping the parents. Afterwards, Matthew requests advice about Taylor, who he cannot stop thinking about.

"Hugh" asks the 15-year-old Zoey for her Christmas wish. Although no longer believing in Santa, she wishes her mother would start dating, as she is too focused on her. After googling "The Screaming Kittens", Zoey suspects she used to be fun.

Later, as "Hugh" interacts with the kids, he works to connect with them. Soon, the word gets out, and suddenly the public loves him. A viral video of "Hugh" helping a girl with a stutter gets him invited to the resort's annual Christmas party.

Before receiving the invite, Zoey coaxes Taylor into meeting Matthew for hot chocolate. Getting to know each other, she reveals her pregnancy by her rocker boyfriend forced her to quit college, although he continued pursuing music. Matthew admits to being unruly since his mom's death when he was 15.

During the day, Matthew reteaches Taylor to ski. They further connect, as when she falls, he helps her up. Then Matthew invites Taylor to the resort's Christmas party.

Unable to find "Hugh" on Google with his name or image, Natasha discovers his social security number is Taylor's. At the party, with Eric and Kenny's help, Taylor switches back and forth between the disguise and her red dress, until Natasha calls "Hugh" a fake. Before she can respond, Zoey gets hurt on the slope, so Taylor responds with her natural voice and hurries to the ambulance. Ava, a snobby girl from Zoey's snowboarding course and Natasha's daughter, explains what happened. In front of the crowd, Taylor removes the disguise, coming clean. Afterwards as Natasha lists ways to retaliate, Robert refuses. Matthew steps forward to take the blame and Robert states that Matthew has done enough.

Ava asks Natalie about Zoey's condition. When she praises Taylor, her mother calls her a fraud. Ava defends her, especially for her listening skills. So, the mother and daughter have a heart-to-heart. At home, Taylor and Zoey talk about what happened. The teen mentions the unmasking video has gone viral. Taylor apologizes for embarrassing her, but Zoey is proud. Talking about Matthew, Taylor mentions he has not called.

Later on, Natasha suggests Matthew give the official remarks at the resort's closing Christmas concert. He quite skillfully apologizes for the resort's now lack of Santa and the confusion surrounding it. Matthew reminds everyone that Santa is really a concept of kindness, generosity and love. Upon Doralee's advice, Taylor joins Matthew on the stage. Apologizing to everyone for what happened, she explains she had needed a job and wanted to help Zoey, so took the opportunity to embody Santa when it emerged. Taylor and Matthew admit their mutual feelings for each other, and kiss.

On Christmas Day, both families and an invited Doralee celebrate as Doralee catches Robert under the mistletoe.

== Cast ==
- Alexandra Breckenridge as Taylor Jacobson, a downsized worker at Clotz' Cookies, single mother, and member of The Screaming Kittens band that poses as "Hugh Mann" when working as Santa Claus
- Ryan Eggold as Matthew Layne, the playboy general manager of Sun Peaks Resort
- Tia Mowry as Natasha Burton, the Vice-President of Marketing at Sun Peaks Resort who gets annoyed with Matthew and suspicious of "Hugh Mann"
- Madison MacIsaac as Zoey Jacobson, the daughter of Taylor who wants to master snowboarding
- Diana Maria Riva as Doralee, the lonely building superintendent of the building that Taylor and Zoey live in
- William C. Vaughan as Eric Jacobson, the brother of Taylor who designs costumes and helps her out with her "Hugh Mann" disguise
- Nathan Kay as Connor, the partner of Eric who also helps Taylor with her "Hugh Mann" disguise
- Adam Beauchesne as Kenny, a man who works as a personal assistant at Sun Peaks Resort
- Dominic Fox as Jimmy, the Christmas elf actor at Sun Peaks Resort
- Barry Levy as Robert Layne, the proprietor of Sun Peaks Resort and other known resorts
- Sasha Rojen as Ava Burton, the neglected daughter of Natasha who originally picks on Zoey and has a divorced father in London
- Catriona Leger as Melissa
- Shawn Macdonald as Mr. Clotz, the owner of Clotz' Cookies who downsizes Taylor due to their cookie sales being low
- Cam Woodman as Sebastian

== Production ==
The film is directed by Mike Rohl, and written by Carley Smale and Ron Oliver. It is produced by Howard and Alexander Braunstein.

The cast is led by Alexandra Breckenridge, Ryan Eggold, Tia Mowry, Madison MacIsaac, and Diana Maria Riva.

Principal photography took place in Kamloops, British Columbia in February, 2025.

Most of the film was shot at Sun Peaks Resort, in Sun Peaks, British Columbia in February, 2025. The resort negotiated to have its actual name used in the film.

Music is composed by Matthew Rogers, and features, among other tracks, Run Rudolph Run.

== Release ==
The film was released on Netflix on December 3, 2025.

== Reception ==
On the review aggregator website Rotten Tomatoes, 73% of 15 critics' reviews are positive.
