= Damian Terriquez =

American actor

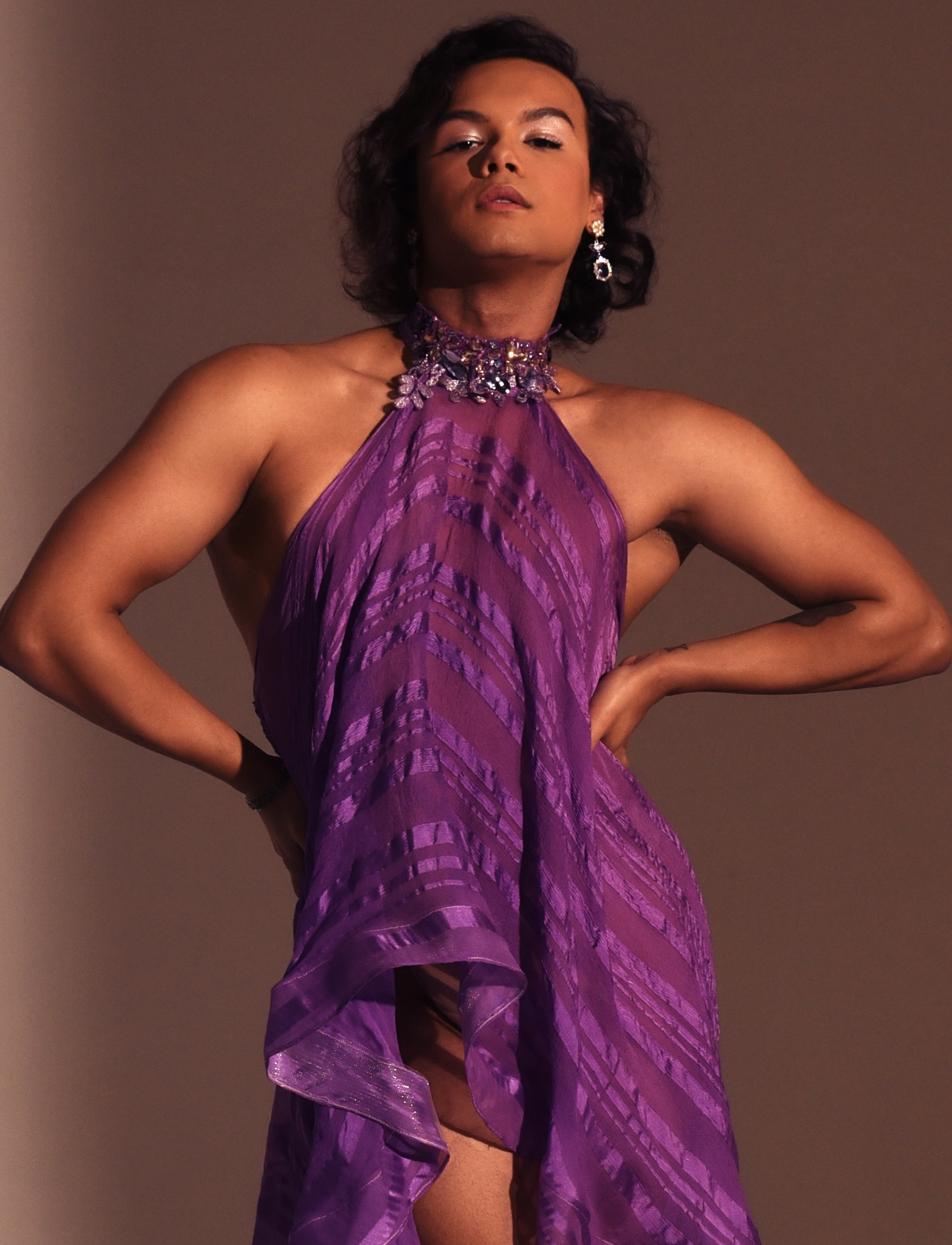
- Terriquez posing for a magazine cover in June 2023
- Born: January 24, 1998 (age 28); San Diego, California, US
- Citizenship: Mexican and American
- Education: Woodbury University
- Occupation: Actor
- Years active: 2022–present
- Television: Glamorous, All Rise
- Political party: Democratic

Damian Terriquez (born January 24, 1998) is a Mexican-American actor best known for their work on the Netflix series Glamorous and That '90s Show. Before pursuing acting Terriquez worked in dance and television production. They have also been involved in LGBT+ Advocacy, HIV/AIDS philanthropy, and politics.

== Early Life ==
Damian Terriquez was born on January 24, 1998 in San Diego, California, to a Mexican mother and American born father. They were raised both in Tijuana, Baja California, Mexico and Imperial Beach, California. Their family has roots in Guadalajara and Guasave, Mexico.

Terriquez developed an early interest in entertainment growing up in Tijuana, where they frequently watched movies at their mother's workplace, by renting movies from Hollywood Video which had a location next door. The family later moved to Temecula after the death of their father and became involved in cheerleading, gymnastics and dance. After a high school coach noticed their gymnastics abilities, Terriquez joined the varsity cheerleading team. They subsequently pursued competitive dance, receiving multiple awards and achieving a ranking among the top ten dancers in North America. They completed high school in three years.

Before pursuing acting professionally, Terriquez continued their involvement in performance through dance and choreography, appearing in music videos for Halsey, Dillon Francis, and Tiësto.

== Education ==
Terriquez attended California State University San Marcos as the first person in their family to go to attend university before participating in a study abroad program at the University of Roehampton in London. They subsequently transferred and received their degree in marketing from Woodbury University in 2020.

While at Woodbury, Terriquez developed the concept for a gender-neutral fashion label as a part of their coursework. In 2019 they were inducted to Beta Gamma Sigma, an international academic honorary society, as one of ten high-achieving students in the university's business programs. Terriquez speaks English, Spanish and French.

== Career ==
On October 21, 2016, Terriquez was a featured dancer in Phillip Chbeeb's dance video for Gregory Porter's "Liquid Spirit".

From 2017 to 2018 Terriquez was featured in concert visuals for Halsey's Hopeless Fountain Kingdom Tour.

During their time in university, Terriquez auditioned for film and television roles that required dancers and was first exposed to the industry in a significant way during the audition process for Step Up in 2019. They also began their career in television working as a production assistant and department coordinator on productions for HBOMax and Amazon's Freevee.

Terriquez began exclusively acting in 2022, and soon landed their first credit on All Rise playing Shay. The episode aired on July 26, 2022, on the Oprah Winfrey Network. They also briefly appeared as Paolo on That '90s Show opposite Wilmer Valderrama. Shortly after Terriquez was cast as Dizmal on the Netflix drama Glamorous with Kim Cattrall. On the Netflix series, Terriquez plays Dizmal, is a Bushwick fixture, bouncer, DJ, and Drag Show MC who welcomes Marco to the world of Brooklyn nightlife.

== Activism and philanthropy ==
As a Latiné, first-generation, non-binary, LGBTQIA+ actor, Terriquez brings an intersectional approach to activism and philanthropy. Terriquez is an active supporter of the Elizabeth Taylor AIDS Foundation, helping raise funds an awareness on a national and local level. They also advocate for trans and non-binary progress via the Connie Norman Transgender Empowerment Center in Los Angeles. Additional they advocate for the inclusion of more queer voices throughout the entire industry, in front of the camera and behind it. As a former dancer Terriquez enjoys going out and supporting the arts including the ballet and musicals. On August 24, 2024 Terriquez, along with other trans and non-binary activists, led a national march on Washington for trans and non-binary rights and visibility.

== Politics ==
Terriquez is a Democrat and began working with the Biden/Harris 2024 campaign as an entertainment surrogate starting in May 2024 in lead up to the 2024 presidential election. Since then they have met with Vice President Kamala Harris, President Joe Biden and President Barack Obama. Terriquez was also seen attending the 25th Annual DNC LGBT Fundraiser in New York City in June 2024 with other high profile democrats. On their tour with the campaign Terriquez has hosted town halls in California and kickstarting Biden/Harris events in battleground states including Pennsylvania, Nevada, Arizona and North Carolina. When Biden dropped out of the 2024 presidential campaign, Terriquez stayed on as an entertainment surrogate for Harris's 2024 campaign.

== Personal life ==
Terriquez identifies as and non-binary and uses they/them pronouns. They married actor and former comedian Luke Lowrey on January 24, 2026 in Puebla, Mexico at the former 16th century convent turned hotel Quinta Real Puebla. They were originally engaged back in 2020 and Lowrey proposed with a 6 ct pear shaped solitaire.

The wedding was planned as a celebration of Mexican culture and incorporated traditions connected to Terriquez's heritage.During the cocktail hour, mariachi's accompanied light bites while during the reception a surprise banda opened the dance floor with the song El Sinaloense. Terriquez wore a gown by Milla Nova with a custom French Chantilly lace blouse and mantilla style veil. Lowrey wore a custom mariachi/charro suit designed by Jorge Tello, otherwise known as 'El Maestro'.

In an interview and exclusive wedding feature published by Out Magazine in February 2026, the couple described the ceremony as an opportunity to bring together their families, friends and communities to celebrate their relationship alongside the traditions of Mexico. They also discussed the significance of presenting a queer marriage as a happy ending particularly for members of the LGBT community who may not always see themselves represented by traditional milestones. Significantly, the relationship had also been blessed by Cardinal McElroy. After the wedding the couple donated the remaining flowers to nearby churches and the Basilica Cathedral of Puebla.
