= Diana-Maria Riva =

American actress

Diana Maria Riva
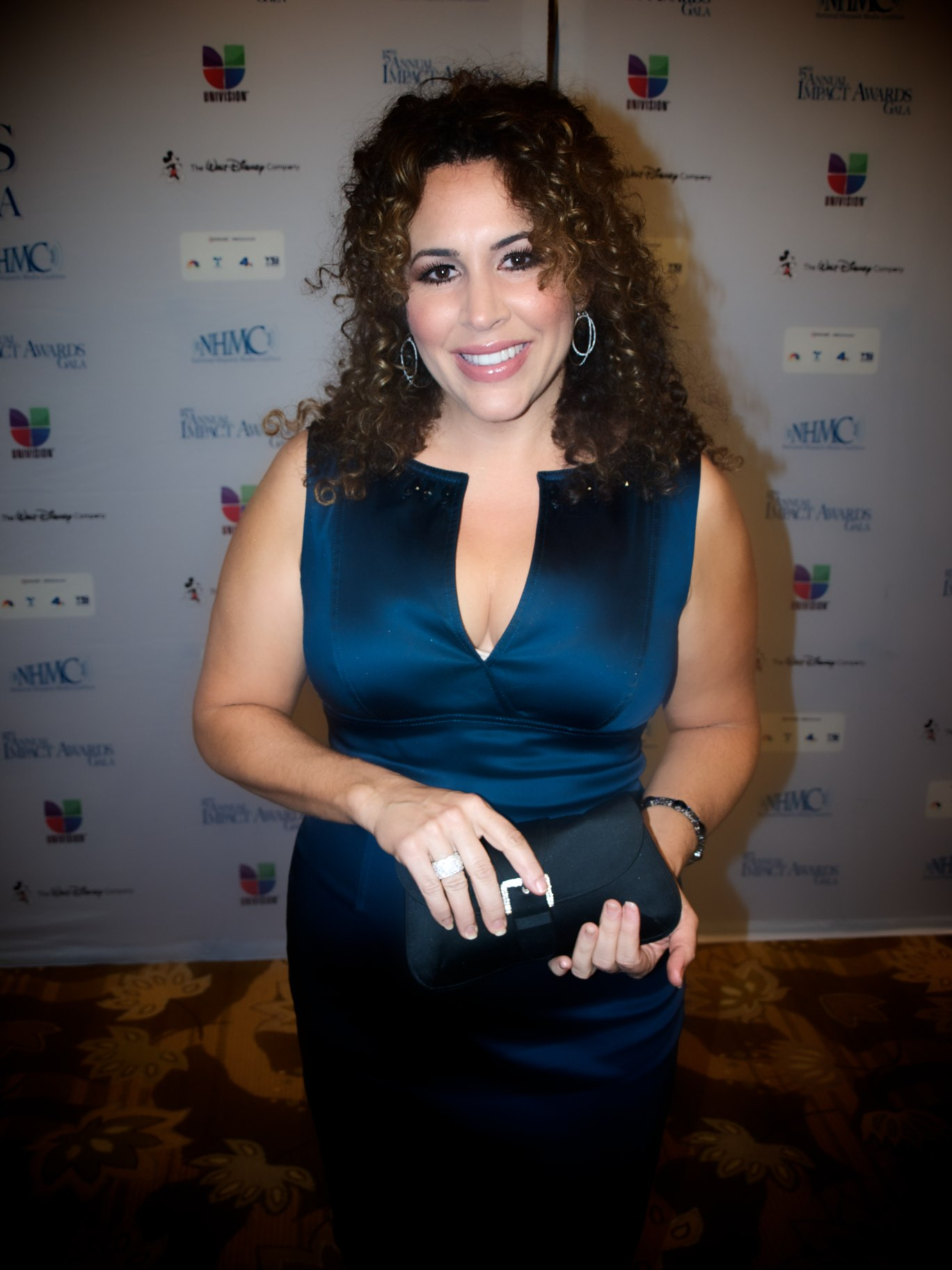
- Riva in 2012
- Born: July 22, 1969 (age 57); Cincinnati, Ohio, U.S.
- Education: University of Cincinnati (BFA)
- Occupation: Actress
- Years active: 1996–present

Diana Maria Riva (born. July 22, 1969) is an American actress, known for her performances on television. She was a regular cast member in series including Philly (2001–02), Side Order of Life (2007), The Good Guys (2010), Telenovela (2015–16) and Gordita Chronicles (2022). Riva also had major recurring roles in The West Wing, The Bridge, Dead to Me and Glamorous.

== Early life ==
Diana Maria Riva born of Dominican roots grew up in Cincinnati, Ohio. She attended St. Ursula Academy and the University of Cincinnati – College-Conservatory of Music.

== Career ==
Riva began her career on stage appearing in Michael Weller play Help! in 1996. Also that year, she made her screen debut in the short-lived ABC comedy series, Common Law. The series was canceled after only four episodes. She later was cast in a recurring role in the ABC legal series, Murder One created by Steven Bochco. She later would appear on regular and recurring roles on his shows including NYPD Blue (1997, 1999), City of Angels (2000), and Philly (2001–02). Her other early television credits including Party of Five, The X Files, The Drew Carey Show, Everybody Loves Raymond, CSI, and Less Than Perfect. She has also appeared as a celebrity guest on the Donny Osmond version of the game show Pyramid.

In 2000, Riva made her big screen debut playing the supporting role in the romantic comedy film, What Women Want. She later appeared in films The Third Wheel (2002), Chasing Papi (2003), Our Family Wedding (2010), Short Term 12 (2012), Love & Mercy (2014), and McFarland, USA (2015). Riva had recurring roles in Sabrina The Teenage Witch (2002–03), The West Wing (2005–06), and Studio 60 on the Sunset Strip (2006–07). In 2007, she starred in the short-lived Lifetime drama series, Side Order of Life.

In 2010, Riva starred as Lieutenant Ana Ruiz in the FOX police comedy series, The Good Guys as the boss of detectives Dan Stark (West Wing/Studio 60 alum Bradley Whitford) and Jack Bailey (Colin Hanks) in the Dallas Police Department. In 2012, she starred as a mother-in-law of Rob Schneider's title character in the short-lived CBS sitcom Rob!. From 2013 to 2015, she had a recurring role in the FX crime drama The Bridge, and from 2015 to 2016 starred alongside Eva Longoria in the NBC comedy series, Telenovela. The following year, she was regular cast member during the first season of CBS sitcom Man with a Plan as Mrs. Rodriguez. In 2019, she starred in the NBC sitcom Sunnyside opposite Kal Penn, and from 2019 to 2022 had a recurring role on the Netflix comedy-drama series, Dead to Me. In 2022, she starred in the HBOMax comedy series, Gordita Chronicles. In 2023, Diana starred in the Netflix series Glamorous as Julia, mother to Miss Benny’s Marco.

== Filmography ==
=== Film ===
Year	Title	Role	Notes
2000	What Women Want	Stella	
2002	The Third Wheel	Rose Lady	
2003	Chasing Papi	Fala	
2003	Exposed	Maria	
2004	Employee of the Month	Deloris Crabtree	
2009	17 Again	Judge	
2010	Our Family Wedding	Sonia Ramirez	
2013	Short Term 12	Nurse Beth	
2013	Tuna	Marie	
2014	Love & Mercy	Gloria	
2015	McFarland, USA	Señora Diaz	
2019	Noelle	Helen Rojas	
2020	Kajillionaire	Farida	
2025	My Secret Santa		Post-production

=== Television ===
Year	Title	Role	Notes
1996	Common Law	Maria Marquez	
1997	Murder One		
1998	The Pretender	Lupe Harmon	
1997–1999	Party of Five	Loraina/Nurse	
1999	The X Files	Angela Villareal	Episode: "Agua Mala"
1997–1999	NYPD Blue	Maxine / Matron	
1999–2001	Everybody Loves Raymond	Sarah	2 episodes
2000	The Drew Carey Show	Elena	Episode: "Drew and the Racial Tension Play"
2000	City of Angels	Connie	4 episodes
2001–2002	Philly	Patricia	
2002–2003	Sabrina The Teenage Witch	Annie	
2004	CSI	Juanita	Episode: "XX"
2004	Reba	Miss Laurie	
2004–2005	Less Than Perfect	Vivian	
2005–2006	The West Wing	Edie Ortega	
2006–2007	Studio 60 on the Sunset Strip	Lilly Rodriguez	
2007	Standoff	Marta	Episode: "No Strings"
2007	The Loop	Benita	2 episodes
2007	Side Order of Life	Vivy Porter	Series regular
2008	Ghost Whisperer	Mrs. Alden	Episode: "Home But Not Alone"
2009	Castle	Detective Roselyn Karpowski	2 episodes
2009	In Plain Sight	Roberta Procter	Episode "Who's Bugging Mary?"
2010	The Good Guys	Lieutenant Ana Ruiz	Series regular
2012	Rob	Rosa	Series regular, 8 episodes
2013–2015	The Bridge	Kitty Conchas	Recurring role
2014	Saint George	Concepcion	4 episodes
2014	NCIS: Los Angeles	Marcella	Episode: "Black Budget"
2014	Manhattan Love Story	Angie	Episode: "Happy Thanksmas"
2015	Girl Meets World	Chairperson Sanchez	Episode: "Girl Meets Creativity"
2015–2016	Telenovela	Mimi Moncada	Series regular Nominated — Imagen Award for Best Supporting Actress – Television
2016–2017	Man with a Plan	Mrs. Rodriguez	Series regular (season 1); 17 episodes
2017	The Mayor	Franny	Episode: "The Strike"
2018	Madam Secretary	Sister Anne Gutierrez	Episode: "The Magic Rake"
2019–2022	Dead to Me	Detective Ana Perez	Recurring role Imagen Award for Best Supporting Actress – Television (2021); Nominated — Screen Actors Guild Award for Outstanding Performance by an Ensemble in a Comedy Series
2019	Sunnyside	Griselda	Series regular, 11 episodes
2020	The George Lucas Talk Show	Herself	Stu-D2 1138 on the Binary Sunset Sith (Studio 60 on the Sunset Strip marathon)
2022	Gordita Chronicles	Adela	Series regular
2023	Glamorous	Julia Mejia	10 episodes
2024	Lopez vs Lopez	Olga	Episode: "Lopez vs. Swap Meat"
2024	Tracker	Det. Helen Brock	Episode: "Aurora"
2026	DMV	Trish	Episode: "Hot Gurlz"
