= Heatwave (Bronze Avery album) =

Studio album by Bronze Avery
- Released: June 13, 2024
- Length: 34:18
- Producer: Bronze Avery, Dex Barstad, Scro, Saint Patrick, Hidden Ppl

Bronze Avery chronology
Softmetal (2022)	Heatwave (2024)

Singles from Heatwave
- 1. "The One (If You Touch Me)" Released: June 9, 2023; 2. "Sex In The Room" Released: August 8, 2023; 3. "Scan And Copy" Released: September 8, 2023; 4. "It Is What It Is" Released: December 8, 2023; 5. "Dangerous" Released: February 8, 2024; 6. "Spring Break" Released: March 7, 2024; 7. "Hollywood's Talking" Released: May 8, 2024; 8. "Chaotic Ride" Released: May 30, 2024

Heatwave is the second studio album by American singer-songwriter & producer Bronze Avery, released on June 13, 2024. The album has uptempo electro-pop beats with lyrical content on Avery's experience as a queer person.

== Composition ==
Heatwave is conceptually based on Bronze Avery's experience as a queer man. The album is sonically inspired by Euro-house and artists Kylie Minogue and Janet Jackson. Avery stated this album is a "collection of summer songs made to make you sweat". The video for "Heatwave" features actors Zane Phillips and Fin Argus.

== Track listing ==
Track listing and credits adapted from Apple Music and Spotify.

Sinematic
No.	Title	Writer(s)	Producer(s)	Length
1.	"Heatwave"	Bronze Avery	Avery; Dex Barstad	2:18
2.	"Spring Break"	Avery	Avery	2:07
3.	"The One (If You Touch Me)"	Avery	Avery	2:41
4.	"Shy"	Avery	Avery	3:14
5.	"Undercover"	Avery	Avery	2:03
6.	"It Is What It Is"	Avery; Justin "Jussy" Gilbert	Avery	1:54
7.	"Chaotic Ride"	Avery	Avery	2:30
8.	"It's U"	Avery; Emily Rose Persich; Spencer Landauer	Avery; Scro; Saint Patrick	2:19
9.	"100 Degrees"	Avery; Hidden Ppl	Avery; Hidden Ppl	2:16
10.	"Dangerous"	Avery	Avery; White Noise	2:15
11.	"Scan And Copy"	Avery	Avery	2:42
12.	"Hollywood's Talking"	Avery	Avery	2:22
13.	"Sex In The Room"	Avery	Avery; Scro	2:53
14.	"Are You Dreaming?"	Avery	Avery; Barstad	2:37
Total length:				34:18

== Personnel ==
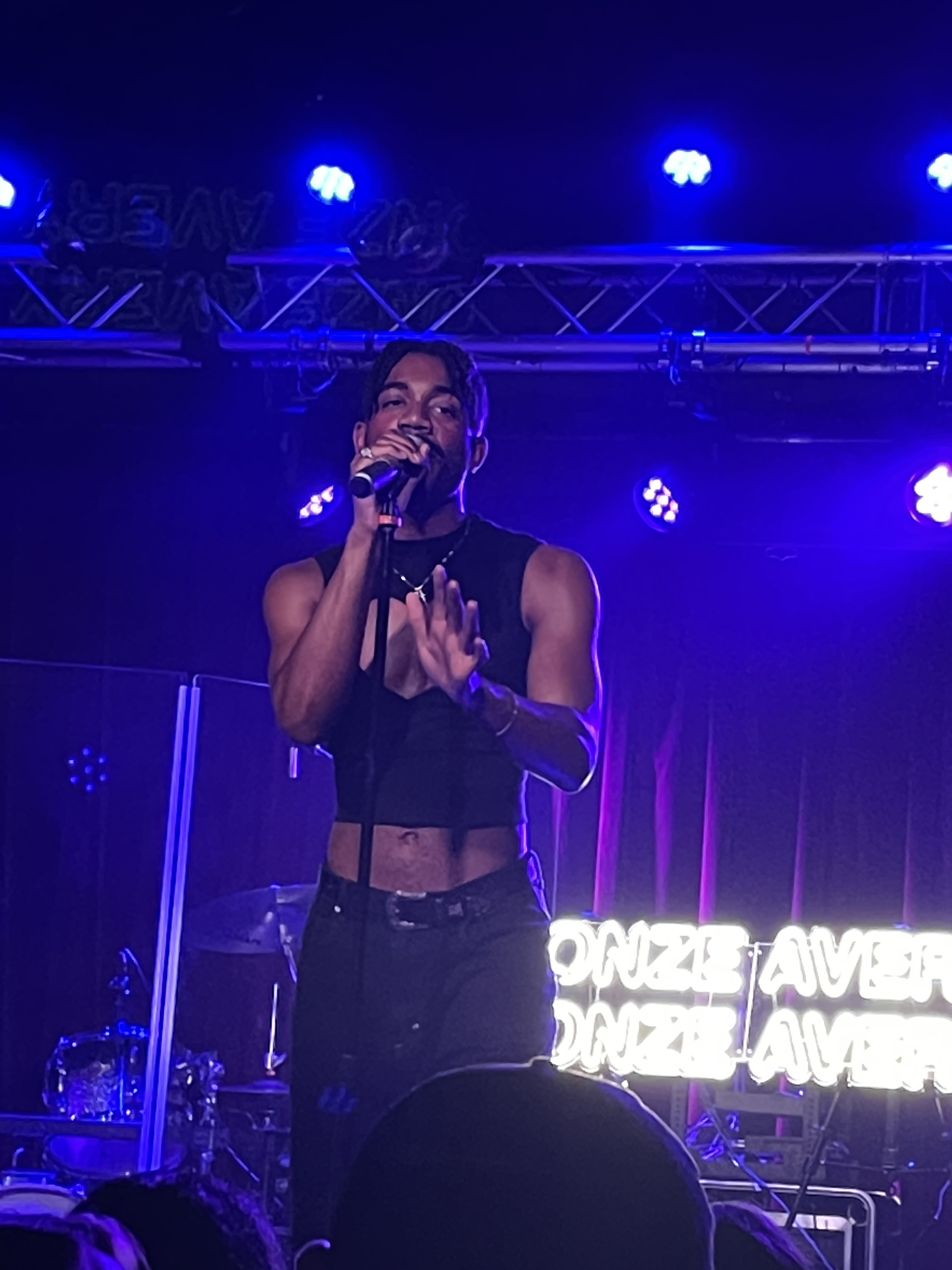
Bronze Avery

Personnel adapted from Apple Music and Spotify.

- Bronze Avery – primary artist, composer, producer
- Hidden Ppl – composer, producer
- Dex Barstad – producer
- White Noise – producer
- Scro – producer
- Justin "Jussy" Gilbert – composer
- Emily Rose Persich – composer
- Spencer Landauer – composer
