= How to Make Gravy (film) =

2024 Australian drama film

- Theatrical release poster
- Directed by: Nick Waterman
- Screenplay by: Nick Waterman; Meg Washington
- Based on: "How to Make Gravy" by Paul Kelly
- Produced by: Schuyler Weiss; Nick Waterman; Meg Washington; Hamish Lewis
- Starring: Daniel Henshall; Agathe Rousselle; Brenton Thwaites; Damon Herriman; Kate Mulvany; Jonah Wren Phillips; Kieran Darcy-Smith; Hugo Weaving
- Cinematography: Edward Goldner
- Edited by: Ahmad Halimi
- Music by: Samuel Dixon
- Production companies: Foxtel; Screen Queensland; Fifth Season; Warner Bros. International Australia; Speech & Drama Pictures
- Distributed by: Binge
- Release date: 1 December 2024
- Running time: 120 minutes
- Country: Australia
- Language: English

How to Make Gravy is a 2024 Australian drama film directed by Nick Waterman from a screenplay he co-wrote with Megan Washington, based on the 1996 song of the same name by Paul Kelly. It was produced by Warner Bros. International Australia. This was also the first original film to be released by the Australian streaming service Binge. At the 2025 ARIA Music Awards the soundtrack won the Best Original Soundtrack, Cast or Show Album category.

== Synopsis ==
The film expands on the characters and stories detailed within the song's lyrics, which take the form of a letter from Joe writing from prison, four days before Christmas.

== Production ==
The film was produced on the Gold Coast, Queensland, with filming commencing in October 2023.

== Cast ==
- Daniel Henshall as Joe
- Jonah Wren Phillips as Angus (Joe & Rita's son)
- Brenton Thwaites as Dan (Joe's brother)
- Kate Mulvany as Stella (Joe's sister)
- Damon Herriman as Roger (Stella's husband)
- Agathe Rousselle as Rita (Joe's wife)
- Hugo Weaving as Noel
- Kieran Darcy-Smith as Red
- Brendan Maclean as Possum
- Megan Washington as Kelly
- Kim Gyngell as Murray (Joe & Stella's uncle)
- Eugene Gilfedder as Gary (Joe & Stella's uncle)
- Eloise Rothfield as Mary (Dan's daughter)
- Rose Statham as Frank (Joe & Rita's daughter)
- Izzy Westlake as Dolly (Joe & Rita's daughter)

Paul Kelly made a cameo appearance as a bus driver in the film.

== Release ==
The film was originally set for release as a Christmas movie by Warner Bros in December 2023. That was delayed, and it was then released, by the Binge streaming service, on 1 December 2024.

A trailer for the film was released on 9 October 2024.

== Reception ==
Garry Maddox, of The Sydney Morning Herald, praised the film, saying that it was an impressive expansion of the original song, with Henshall, Weaving and Herriman all providing moving performances. Maddox rated the film four out of five stars.

In his review, Luke Buckmaster of The Guardian said that the film veered towards sentimentalism, and that it was a well-intentioned misfire. He rated the film two out of five stars. Jenny Valentish, also of The Guardian, praised the production design, noting that it was almost impossible to pin the film down to a specific era, with its use of an earthy 70s colour palette, and the fashion and cars being 90s shabby.

== Soundtrack ==
How to Make Gravy

Soundtrack album by Various Artists
- Released: 13 December 2024
- Label: Suitcase Records

Singles from How to Make Gravy
- 1. "The Hook" Released: 26 September 2024

A limited edition soundtrack was released on vinyl in December 2024. At the 2025 ARIA Music Awards, the album won ARIA Award for Best Original Soundtrack, Cast or Show Album.

On 29 November 2024, three songs were released digitally; Electric Fields' "Dream On", Brendan Maclean's "Fine" and Beddy Rays' "Red Hot Chrissy".

How to Make Gravy
No.	Title	Writer(s)	Performer(s)	Length
1.	"My Little Drum"	Vince Guaraldi	Vince Guaraldi	3:12
2.	"Red Hot Chrissy"	Jackson Van Issum, Lewis McKenna, Bradley O'Connor, Benjamin Wade, Matthew Cochran	Beddy Rays	2:20
3.	"Christmas Time Is Here"	Vince Guaraldi, Lee Mendelson	Vince Guaraldi	3:47
4.	"Take Care of Business"	Andrew Benjamin Stround	Nina Simone	2:05
5.	"The Hook"	Meg Washington, Mehdi Benjelloun	Meg Washington	3:05
6.	"Dream On"	Meg Washington	Electric Fields & the Prison Choir	3:51
7.	"Isolationism"	Ben Salter, C MacDonald	Ben Salter	3:37
8.	"Fine"	Washington	Brendan Maclean & the Prison Choir	3:36
9.	"Hark the Herald Angels Sing"	Charles Wesley	Vince Guaraldi	1:54
10.	"How to Make Gravy"	Paul Kelly	Paul Kelly	4:28
Total length:				34:44

== Accolades ==
Accolades received by How to Make Gravy(film)
Award	Date of ceremony	Category	Recipient(s)	Result	Ref.
AACTA Awards	7 February 2025	Best Film	Schuyler Weiss, Hamish Lewis, Nick Waterman, Meg Washington, Michael Brooks	Nominated	
AACTA Awards	7 February 2025	Best Direction	Nick Waterman	Nominated	
AACTA Awards	7 February 2025	Best Lead Actor	Daniel Henshall	Nominated	
AACTA Awards	7 February 2025	Best Supporting Actor	Damon Herriman	Nominated	
AACTA Awards	7 February 2025	Best Supporting Actor	Hugo Weaving	Nominated	
AACTA Awards	7 February 2025	Best Supporting Actress	Kate Mulvany	Nominated	
AACTA Awards	7 February 2025	Best Screenplay in Film	Meg Washington, Nick Waterman	Nominated	
AACTA Awards	7 February 2025	Best Original Music Score	Sam Dixon	Nominated	
AACTA Awards	7 February 2025	Best Sound	Craig Walmsley, Stuart Morton, Diego Ruiz, Sam Hayward	Nominated	
AACTA Awards	7 February 2025	Best Production Design	Benjamin Fountain, Peter Kodicek	Nominated	
AACTA Awards	7 February 2025	Best Costume Design	Christina Validakis	Nominated	
AACTA Awards	7 February 2025	Best Casting	Nikki Barrett	Nominated	
AACTA Awards	7 February 2025	Best Original Song	"Fine" - Meg Washington, Brendan Maclean & The Prison Choir	Won	
AACTA Awards	7 February 2025	Best Original Song	"Dream On" - Meg Washington, Electric Fields & The Prison Choir	Nominated	
AACTA Awards	7 February 2025	Best Soundtrack	Meg Washington	Nominated	
ARIA Music Awards	19 November 2025	Best Original Soundtrack, Cast or Show Album	How to Make Gravy – Various Artists	Won	
Screen Music Awards	October 2025	Best Original Song Composed for the Screen	"Dream On" (Megan Washington)	Won	

== See also ==
- List of Christmas films
