= Gordita Chronicles =

- Genre: Comedy
- Created by: Claudia Forestieri
- Starring: Diana-Maria Riva; Juan Javier Cardenas; Olivia Goncalves; Savannah Nicole Ruiz; Noah Rico; Cosette Hauer
- Country of origin: United States
- Original languages: English; Spanish
- No. of seasons: 1
- No. of episodes: 10

Production
- Executive producers: Dan Signer; Christopher King; Jennifer Robinson; Zoe Saldaña; Mariel Saldaña; Cisely Saldaña; Eva Longoria; Claudia Forestieri; Josh Berman; Brigitte Muñoz-Liebowitz
- Producer: Matt Claybrooks
- Production companies: Osprey Productions; Cinestar; UnbeliEVAble Entertainment; Bons Mots Emporium Inc; Sony Pictures Television Studios; HBO Max Originals

Original release
- Network: HBO Max
- Release: June 23, 2022

Gordita Chronicles is an American comedy television series that premiered on the streaming service HBO Max on June 23, 2022. The series tells the story of Cucu Castelli, a reporter who narrates her youth in the 1980s as a willful and reluctant "gordita" (transl. "chubby girl") whose family immigrates to Miami, Florida from the Dominican Republic. Cucu's father is a rising executive with an airline serving Florida and the Caribbean.

On July 29, 2022, it was announced the series was cancelled after one season, part of a reduction in family-oriented programming on the HBO Max service. The series was removed from the HBO Max streaming service in December 2022.

== Cast ==
- Olivia Goncalves as Carlota "Cucu" Castelli
  - Dascha Polanco as the voice of Adult Cucu
- Juan Javier Cardenas as Victor Castelli, Cucu's father
- Diana-Maria Riva as Adela Castelli (née Torres), Cucu's mother
- Savannah Nicole Ruiz as Emilia Castelli, Cucu's sister
- Cosette Hauer as Ashley
- Noah Rico as Yosmel "Yoshy" Hernandez
- Patrick Fabian as Mr. Frank, Victor's Boss
- Tati McQuay as Dani
- Pete Gardner as Keith Colorado
- Noah Cottrell as Rigo
- Arian Cartaya as Álvaro

== Episodes ==
No.	Title	Directed by	Written by	Original release date
1	"In America Everything Is Possible"	Eva Longoria	Claudia Forestieri	June 23, 2022
2	"In America We Speak English"	Melissa Kosar	Claudia Forestieri & Brigitte Muñoz-Liebowitz	June 23, 2022
3	"In America No One Likes a Chicken"	Melissa Kosar	Dan Signer	June 23, 2022
4	"In America We Sleepover"	Randall Winston	Isaac Gonzalez	June 23, 2022
5	"In America We Trick or Treat"	Angela Tortu	Shawn Wines	June 23, 2022
6	"In America We Play to Win"	Ilana Peña	Matt Claybrooks	June 23, 2022
7	"In America We Stereotype"	Angela Tortu	Jenny Yang	June 23, 2022
8	"In America You Get What You Pay For"	Melissa Fumero	Kryzz Gautier	June 23, 2022
9	"In America We Fall in Love"	Jay Karas	Francisco Cabrera-Feo	June 23, 2022
10	"In America We're Brave"	Randall Winston	Rebecca Delgado Smith	June 23, 2022

== Reception ==
The series received generally positive reviews.

Angie Han of The Hollywood Reporter commented "Like its heroine, Gordita Chronicles shows the potential to grow into something special — and also like its heroine, it's sweet enough to earn our patience while finding its way there." Robert Lloyd of the Los Angeles Times called it the "sitcom of the summer", writing that it "is family comedy of a classic sort – with a few significant differences – funny and appealing and sometimes moving." Daniel D'Addario at Variety called it charming but criticized its at times unclear tone.

== Availability ==
The HBO main pay television network airs reruns of the series. In March 2024, Tubi added access to the series. In June 2024, the series was added to Hulu.
