= Bronze Avery =

American singer-songwriter

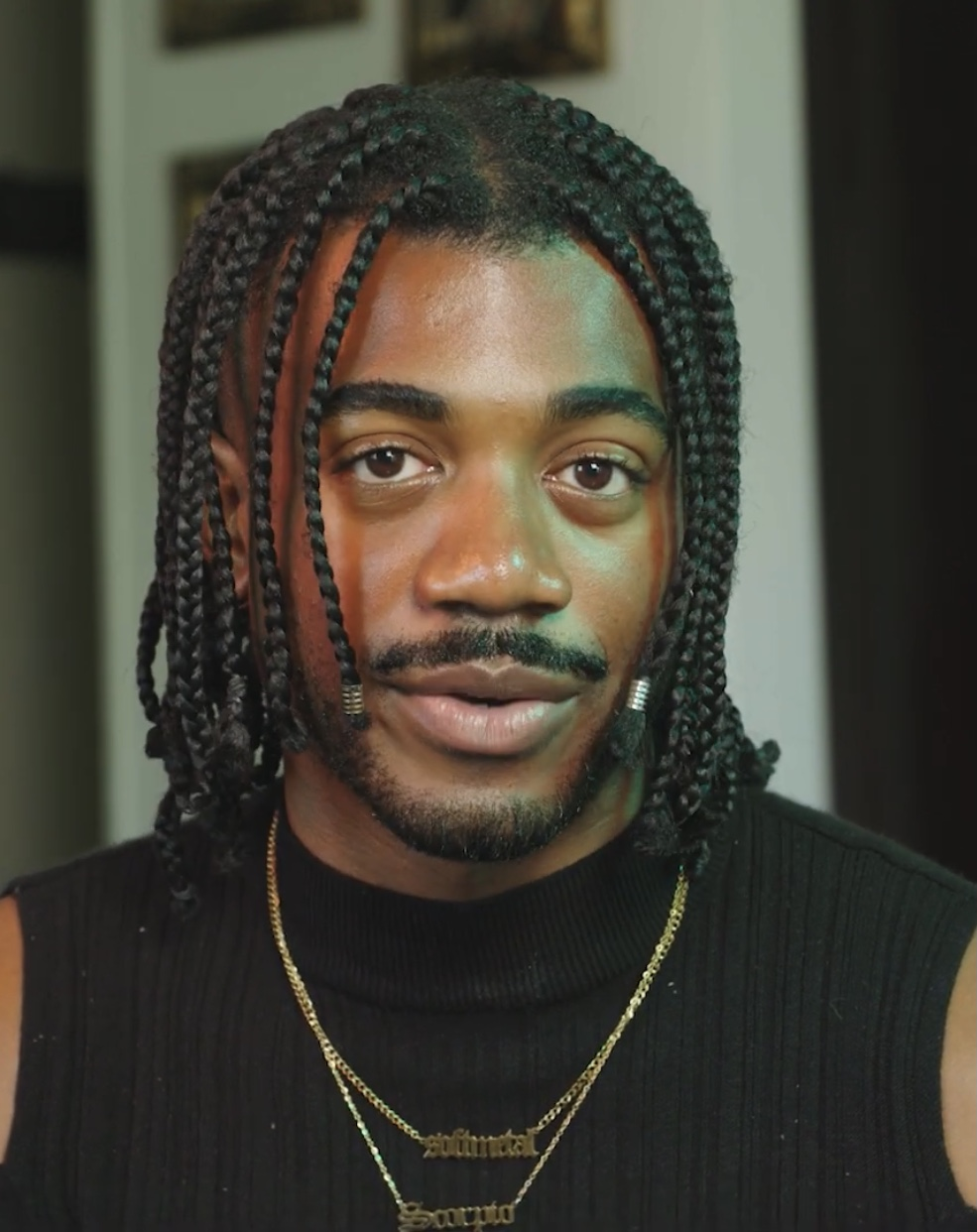
- Avery in 2022

Background information
- Born: Gabriel Nathaniel Brown; October 24, 1994 (age 31)
- Origin: Orlando, Florida, U.S.
- Genres: Pop
- Years active: 2015–present
- Website: bronzeavery.com

Gabriel Nathaniel Brown, (born October 24, 1994) known professionally as Bronze Avery, is an American pop singer-songwriter. He released his debut EP American Dream in 2015 under his birth name. Avery subsequently released several singles and EPs under his stage name, before releasing his debut full-length album, Softmetal in 2022. He released his second studio album Heatwave on June 13, 2024.

== Personal life ==
Gabriel Brown was born in Orlando, Florida to a military family. He grew up as a Navy brat and moved to Seattle, Virginia, Washington, D.C., and Atlanta before returning to Orlando after his parents' divorce. Avery came out as gay by mistake due to a shared family computer. Shows including A Shot at Love with Tila Tequila helped him feel more comfortable while in school. Originally from Orlando, as of 2019, Avery is based in Los Angeles.

== Career ==
Avery is a pop singer-songwriter. He released an EP, American Dream (2015) under his birth name Gabriel Brown. He started going by Bronze Avery to disambiguate himself from several others with the same name. In his earlier music, Avery avoided discussing his sexuality, but has now come to embrace LGBT+ themes. The single "Pressure" is the first song released under his name Bronze Avery. In a 2018 interview with Local Wolves, Avery expressed interest in collaborating with singers Raye and Mabel.

The Orlando nightclub shooting influenced him as a queer musician. He regularly frequented the Pulse nightclub but was in Nashville, Tennessee at the time of the shooting. Avery performed at Los Angeles Pride in 2019.

In 2019, Avery released a music video accompanying the single "Want 2". Shawn Binder was the director and Joe DeSantis was the cinematographer. In an interview with Billboard, Avery stated he does not want to be labeled as an rhythm and blues artist. In June 2019, Avery released the single "Spilling Out" with a music video. On June 13, 2024, Avery released his second studio album Heatwave which has uptempo electro-pop beats with lyrical content on Avery's experience as a queer person. Avery stated this album is a "collection of summer songs made to make you sweat".

=== Artistry ===
Avery is a pop musician. His biggest influence is musician Charli XCX. He is inspired by performers including The Pussycat Dolls and Nelly Furtado, Tove Lo, Banks, and Lana Del Rey. He was influenced by Gwen Stefani's debut album, Love. Angel. Music. Baby. Early LGBT influences of Avery include George Michael and Simon Curtis.

== Discography ==
All credits adapted from Apple Music and Spotify.

=== Albums ===
Title	Details
Softmetal	Released: November 17, 2022; Label: Self-released; Formats: LP, CD, digital download, streaming
Heatwave	Released: June 13, 2024; Label: Self-released; Formats: LP, CD, digital download, streaming

=== Extended plays ===
Title	Details
American Dream	As Gabriel Brown; Released: January 27, 2015; Label: Self-released; Formats: Digital download, streaming
Split	Released: April 4, 2019; Label: Self-released; Formats: Digital download, streaming
Retrospect	Released: November 15, 2019; Label: Self-released; Formats: Digital download, streaming
Flash Burn	Released: May 7, 2021; Label: Self-released; Formats: Digital download, streaming
Softshell	Released: November 8, 2022; Label: Self-released; Formats: Digital download, streaming
The Republic of Motion	Released: November 7, 2025; Label: Self-released; Formats: LP, CD, digital download, streaming

=== Singles ===
Title	Year	Album	Writer(s)	Producer(s)
"Blind" (as Gabriel Brown)	2015	Non-album singles	Gabriel Brown	No producer credited
"Disguise" (as Gabriel Brown)	2015	Non-album singles	Gabriel Brown	No producer credited
"Colossal" (as Gabriel Brown)	2016	Non-album singles	Gabriel Brown	No producer credited
"Leave Together"	2017	Non-album singles	Bronze Avery, Maika Maile	Maika Maile
"Pressure"	2017	Non-album singles	Bronze Avery, Maika Maile	Maika Maile
"Secrets"	2018	Non-album singles	Bronze Avery, Maika Maile	Maika Maile
"Never Gonna Give You Up"	2018	Non-album singles	Stock Aitken Waterman	Maika Maile
"Want 2"	2018	Non-album singles	Bronze Avery, Emily Vaughn, Maika Maile	Maika Maile
"Anybody Else"	2019	Split	Bronze Avery, Emily Vaughn	Bronze Avery
"Spilling Out"	2019	Split	Bronze Avery	Bronze Avery, Michael Salerno
"Never Be You"	2019	Non-album single	Bronze Avery, Maika Maile	Bronze Avery, Maika Maile
"Faking"	2019	Retrospect	Bronze Avery	Bronze Avery
"Messy"	2019	Retrospect	Bronze Avery, Robyn Dell'Unto	Bronze Avery, Robyn Dell'Unto
"Boys!"	2020	Non-album singles	Bronze Avery, Gabe Reali	Bronze Avery
"Only You"	2020	Non-album singles	Bronze Avery	Bronze Avery
"Risky Time"	2020	Non-album singles	Bronze Avery, Mona Khoshoi	Bronze Avery, Mona Khoshoi
"Sea Salt" (featuring Miss Benny)	2020	Non-album singles	Bronze Avery, Miss Benny	Bronze Avery, Miss Benny
"Ready This Time"	2021	Flash Burn	Mark Johns, Bronze Avery, AObeats	AObeats
"No Sleep" (Dance Yourself Clean with Bronze Avery)	2021	Non-album singles	Andrew Verner, Bronze Avery, Fabian Ordorica, Joel Albers	Dance Yourself Clean
"Wild"	2021	Non-album singles	Galvin Baez, Bronze Avery	Bronze Avery
"Happy With Nothing" (featuring Kevin McHale)	2021	Non-album singles	Bronze Avery, Dave Schaeman	Bronze Avery, Dave Schaeman
"Down For Life"	2021	Non-album singles	Cecilia Gault, Bronze Avery	Cecilia Gault, Bronze Avery
"Cry A Lot"	2022	Non-album singles	Galvin Baez, Bronze Avery	Bronze Avery
"Figure It Out"	2022	Softmetal	Bronze Avery	Bronze Avery
"Say Goodnight"	2022	Softmetal	Bronze Avery	Bronze Avery
"Over (And Over)"	2022	Softmetal	Bronze Avery	Bronze Avery
"The One (If You Touch Me)"	2023	Heatwave	Bronze Avery	Bronze Avery
"Sex In The Room"	2023	Heatwave	Bronze Avery	Bronze Avery, Scro
"Scan And Copy"	2023	Heatwave	Bronze Avery	Bronze Avery
"It Is What It Is"	2024	Heatwave	Bronze Avery, Justin "Jussy" Gilbert	Bronze Avery
"Dangerous"	2024	Heatwave	Bronze Avery	Bronze Avery, White Noise
"Spring Break"	2024	Heatwave	Bronze Avery	Bronze Avery
"Hollywood's Talking"	2024	Heatwave	Bronze Avery	Bronze Avery
"Chaotic Ride"	2024	Heatwave	Bronze Avery	Bronze Avery
"tiny purse, tiny top" (featuring Lilyisthatyou)	2024	Non-album single	Bronze Avery, Lillian Phyllis Davies	Bronze Avery
"Only U"	2024	Non-album single	Bronze Avery	Bronze Avery
"On The Money"	2025	Non-album single	Bronze Avery	Bronze Avery
"Divine"	2025	Non-album single	Stephanie Middleton, Bronze Avery	Bronze Avery
"Jaywalk (34th downtown)"	2025	Non-album single	Bronze Avery	Bronze Avery
"Automatic"	2025	The Republic of Motion	Lost Boy, Bronze Avery, Will Talbot	Lost Boy, Bronze Avery
"Round Two"	2025	The Republic of Motion	Bronze Avery, Elijah Hill, Matt Kahane	Elijah Hill, Matt Kahane, Bronze Avery
"Dog Say?"	2026	It's All Fun and Games	Bronze Avery, Shelby Archer, Paul Laliberte, Jeffrey Laliberte	Bronze Avery, The Fund, Shelby Archer, Paul Laliberte, Jeffrey Laliberte
"What are you saying?"	2026	It's All Fun and Games	Bronze Avery	Bronze Avery
"Cry Forever!"	2026	It's All Fun and Games	Bronze Avery, Emily Vaughn, Alex Bilowitz	Bronze Avery, Alex Bilowitz

=== Remixes ===
Title	Year	Other artists
"Sorry Bro (I Love You)"	2020	Dorian Electra
"01902"	2021	Tom Aspaul
