= Graham Parkhurst =

Canadian actor

- Born: March 1, 1988 (age 38); Oshawa, Ontario, Canada
- Education: Sheridan College
- Occupation: Actor
- Years active: 2013–present

Graham Parkhurst (born March 1, 1988) is a Canadian actor, best known for his regular role as Parker in the 2023 Netflix series Glamorous.

Originally from Belleville, Ontario, he was active in local community theatre with Quinte Stage Productions in his teen years, and later won a scholarship to study musical theatre at Sheridan College. He was subsequently a stage actor for a number of years, with credits including productions of Willy Russell's Blood Brothers, Caroline Smith's Panto of the Opera, David Rogers's The Songs of Sinatra, Stephen Schwartz's Godspell, Ken Ludwig's The Fox on the Fairway and Joe DiPietro's All Shook Up.

He also had supporting or guest roles in film and television, including appearances in You Got Trumped: The First 100 Days, Supergirl, Sex/Life, Star Trek: Strange New Worlds and The Umbrella Academy, prior to being cast in Glamorous.

== Personal life ==
Parkhurst is openly gay.
