= Glamorous (TV series) =

American comedy drama television series

- Genre: Comedy drama
- Created by: Jordon Nardino
- Starring: Kim Cattrall; Miss Benny; Jade Payton; Zane Phillips; Michael Hsu Rosen; Ayesha Harris; Graham Parkhurst
- Composer: Joy Ngiaw
- Country of origin: United States
- Original language: English
- No. of seasons: 1
- No. of episodes: 10

Production
- Executive producers: Jordon Nardino; Kameron Tarlow; Damon Wayans Jr.; Frank Siracusa; John Weber; Todd Strauss-Schulson
- Producers: Mary Anne Waterhouse; Kim Cattrall
- Production locations: Toronto, Ontario, Canada
- Running time: 42–47 minutes
- Production companies: Two Shakes Entertainment; CBS Studios

Original release
- Network: Netflix
- Release: June 22, 2023

Glamorous is an American comedy drama television series created by Jordon Nardino, starring Kim Cattrall and Miss Benny. The ten-episode series was released on Netflix on June 22, 2023. On November 15, 2023, the series was canceled after one season.

== Premise ==
Marco, a young makeup enthusiast, is hired as an assistant to beauty mogul Madolyn Addison. Through his work for the company, Glamorous by Madolyn, Marco develops in his identity, navigates dating, creates new friendships, and more. Madolyn also undergoes character development as a result of being around Marco.

== Cast and characters ==
=== Main ===
- Kim Cattrall as Madolyn Addison, a former supermodel and founder of the beauty brand Glamorous by Madolyn
- Miss Benny as Marco Mejia, a makeup and fashion enthusiast who lands a dream job as Madolyn's second assistant
- Jade Payton as Venetia Kelaher, Madolyn's first assistant who wants to further her career
- Zane Phillips as Chad Addison, Madolyn's son and director of sales for Glamorous by Madolyn
- Michael Hsu Rosen as Ben, a graphic designer for Glamorous by Madolyn who shows interest in Marco from their first meeting
- Ayesha Harris as Britt, a graphic designer for Glamorous by Madolyn who has feelings for Venetia
- Graham Parkhurst as Parker, an overconfident "finance bro" and a love interest for Marco

=== Recurring ===
- Diana-Maria Riva as Julia Mejia, Marco's mother and a lawyer who comes to work for Glamorous by Madolyn
- Lisa Gilroy as Alyssasays, a social media director of Glamorous by Madolyn
- Ricardo Chavira as Teddy, Madolyn's full-time driver and confidant
- Mark Deklin as James, an unemployed documentary filmmaker and Madolyn's love interest whom she meets on an elevator
- Nicole Power as Mykynnleigh, a corporate consultant hired by another cosmetics company interested in acquiring Madolyn's company
- Damian Terriquez as Dizmal, a club performer who introduces Marco to Brooklyn nightlife

In addition, Kaleb Horn co-stars as Nowhere, Madolyn's marketing assistant.

=== Guest ===
- Priyanka as herself
- Chiquitita as herself
- Monét X Change as herself
- Joel Kim Booster as Cliff, Parker's ex-boyfriend
- Matt Rogers as Tony, one of Parker's friends

== Episodes ==
| No. | Title | Directed by | Written by | Original release date |
|---|---|---|---|---|
| 1 | "RSVP Now!" | Todd Strauss-Schulson | Jordon Nardino | June 22, 2023 |
| 2 | "Secret Location" | Todd Strauss-Schulson | Justin W. Lo | June 22, 2023 |
| 3 | "Back of the Line" | Brennan Shroff | Ashley Skidmore | June 22, 2023 |
| 4 | "Cash Only" | Brennan Shroff | Jordon Nardino | June 22, 2023 |
| 5 | "I Cannot Accommodate You" | Brennan Shroff | Celeste Vasquez | June 22, 2023 |
| 6 | "We Are at Capacity" | David Warren | Justin W. Lo | June 22, 2023 |
| 7 | "I Don't Care Who You Know" | Brennan Shroff | Tony L. Gomez | June 22, 2023 |
| 8 | "Are You on the List?" | David Warren | Jordon Nardino | June 22, 2023 |
| 9 | "Come Thru" | Rebecca Asher | Ashley Skidmore | June 22, 2023 |
| 10 | "Tip the Girls" | Rebecca Asher | Jordon Nardino | June 22, 2023 |

== Production ==
=== Development ===
On February 1, 2019, The CW ordered the pilot for Glamorous, from writer Jordon Nardino and executive producer Damon Wayans Jr. The series focused on "a gender non-conforming recent high school graduate lands the gig of a lifetime interning at a cosmetics company whose products he panned on YouTube." On February 21, Eva Longoria was announced to direct the pilot. On May 16, 2019, Glamorous remained in contention for a series order. According to The CW president Mark Pedowitz, "it needs some retooling so we can try to move forward with it." However, on June 28, it was announced that Glamorous would not move forward. On April 11, 2022, Netflix ordered Glamorous to series. On July 28, it was announced that Todd Strauss-Schulson would direct the first two episodes.

=== Casting ===
On February 1, 2019, Brooke Shields and Jade Payton were cast as series regulars. On February 26, Ben J. Pierce was cast as the gender-nonconforming lead, opposite Shields, as well as Pierson Fodé, and Michael Rauch joined as an executive producer. Peyton List and Susan Santiago joined the cast on March 13, and Chester Lockhart and Brady Dalton Richards joined the cast on March 22.

On June 30, 2022, it was announced that Kim Cattrall would replace Shields. Additionally, Payton, Zane Phillips, Michael Hsu Rosen, Ayesha Harris, and Graham Parkhurst were set as regulars. Diana Maria Riva, Lisa Gilroy, and Mark Deklin were cast in recurring roles. Additional recurring roles included, Ricardo Chavira, Damian Terriquez, and Kaleb Horn.

== Reception ==
The review aggregator website Rotten Tomatoes reported an approval rating of 47% based on 17 reviews, with an average score of 5.4/10. The website's critics consensus reads, "While Glamorous has several elements that merit celebration, its featherweight touch proves too slight to achieve genuine allure." Metacritic, which uses a weighted average, assigned the series a score of 57 out of 100 based on 7 critics, indicating "mixed or average reviews". The show was in Netflix's Global Top 10 for two weeks, with 43.1 million viewing hours worldwide. It also reached the Top 10 in 69 countries in the weeks following its release.
