= Vantage Point (film) =

- Promotional film poster
- Directed by: Pete Travis
- Written by: Barry L. Levy
- Produced by: Neal H. Moritz
- Starring: Dennis Quaid; Matthew Fox; Eduardo Noriega; Forest Whitaker; Sigourney Weaver; William Hurt; Édgar Ramírez; Ayelet Zurer
- Cinematography: Amir Mokri
- Edited by: Stuart Baird
- Music by: Atli Örvarsson
- Production companies: Columbia Pictures; Relativity Media; Original Film
- Distributed by: Sony Pictures Releasing
- Release dates: February 13, 2008 (Salamanca); February 22, 2008 (United States)
- Running time: 90 minutes
- Country: United States
- Language: English
- Budget: $40 million
- Box office: $152 million

Vantage Point is a 2008 American political action thriller film directed by Pete Travis and written by Barry L. Levy. The story focuses on an assassination attempt on the President of the United States in Salamanca, Spain, as seen from the various vantage points of different characters. The film stars Dennis Quaid, Matthew Fox, Eduardo Noriega, Forest Whitaker, William Hurt and Sigourney Weaver.

The film is often compared unfavorably to Akira Kurosawa's Rashomon, which also employed storytelling through multiple perspectives. Rashomon used the multiple perspectives to question the possibility of truth, in a process called the Rashomon effect; in contrast, Vantage Point recounts a series of events which are re-enacted from several different perspectives and viewpoints to reveal a truthful account of what happened. Vantage Point also explores kidnapping, assassination and terrorism.

The film was co-produced by Relativity Media, Original Film, and Art In Motion, and began filming in Mexico City on June 18, 2006. It premiered in Salamanca on February 13, 2008, and was released in theaters in the United States by Sony Pictures Releasing through its Columbia Pictures label on February 22. The film score, released by Varèse Sarabande on February 26, was composed by Atli Örvarsson.

Vantage Point grossed $151 million worldwide and received mixed reviews from critics.

== Plot ==
In Salamanca, Spain, an assassination attempt on U.S. President Henry Ashton (William Hurt) unfolds from several different vantage points.

GNN producer Rex Brooks directs news coverage from a mobile television studio as the president arrives to a ceremony at the city's Plaza Mayor, for the start of an international summit against terrorism. The mayor of Salamanca introduces the President, who is shot twice as he reaches the podium, soon followed by an explosion outside the plaza. Moments later, a secondary explosion at the podium kills and injures numerous people.

Before the President takes the stage, Secret Service agent Thomas Barnes (Dennis Quaid) notices a curtain fluttering in a supposedly vacated building, and observes American tourist Howard Lewis filming the audience. After the President is shot, Barnes tackles a man named Enrique rushing to the podium. Following the second explosion, Barnes barges into the GNN studio to view their footage. He receives a call from another Secret Service agent, who reports he is pursuing the suspected assassin; Barnes is then startled by an image from GNN's live feed.

Enrique (Eduardo Noriega), a Spanish police officer guarding the Mayor, overhears his girlfriend Veronica being embraced by a stranger and plan to meet later under an overpass. Enrique confronts Veronica, who assures him of her love as he hands her a bag. When the President is shot, Enrique rushes to protect the Mayor but is tackled by Barnes. Enrique witnesses Veronica toss the bag under the podium, causing the second explosion. Escaping the Secret Service, Enrique confronts an unseen individual at the overpass.

In the crowd, Howard Lewis chats with a man called Sam, while a little girl named Anna bumps into him. Howard notices Barnes looking at the nearby window, and films him with his camcorder. Following the explosion at the podium, Howard chases Enrique and the pursuing Secret Service agents. At the overpass, Howard views the agents from afar shooting at Enrique as he greets an individual in a police uniform under the overpass. Wounded, Enrique falls to the ground. As a speeding ambulance is about to hit Anna, Howard runs into the road after her.

Previously, Ashton, having been informed of a credible threat, returns to his hotel room while his body double proceeds to the plaza. Ashton and his personnel discuss the reason and origin for the terrorists' plot, and the return of Barnes to active duty; they watch on TV the double being shot and the first explosion. One adviser is intent on Ashton giving immediate order for retaliation against the village of origin of the terrorists they are aware of, when the second explosion shatters the room's windows. The staffer insists in earnest on retaliation, but Ashton refuses, so the negotiations can continue. A masked assailant bursts into the room, shoots the advisers, and abducts Ashton.

At the plaza, terrorist Suarez, previously seen as Sam, shoots Ashton's body double using a remote-controlled automatic rifle placed adjacent to the window that drew Barnes' attention. The rifle is retrieved by Secret Service agent Kent Taylor, who Barnes sees on the GNN live feed leaving the scene wearing a Spanish police uniform. Barnes realizes that Taylor, who happens to be his partner, is part of the terror plot. The man Enrique saw embracing Veronica is revealed to be sharpshooter Javier, whose brother is being held hostage by the terrorists to ensure Javier's cooperation. The explosion at the hotel is detonated by a suicide bomber disguised as a bellhop, who gave Javier a room key. At the hotel, Javier kills the guards and aides and kidnaps the president, placing him in an ambulance with Suarez and Veronica disguised as medics. Javier joins Taylor in a police car to rendezvous at the overpass. Barnes commandeers a car in pursuit, but gets into a collision.

At the overpass, Enrique, who did not die in the blast at the podium as intended, confronts Javier and Taylor. Javier shoots Enrique, mistakenly believing he had knowledge of his brother's whereabouts. Javier is shot dead by Taylor after demanding to be brought to his brother, killed earlier by Suarez. Enrique dies of his wounds as Barnes reaches the scene and fires at Taylor, who attempts to flee. After crashing his car, a critically injured Taylor is dragged out by Barnes, furious at his partner's betrayal, he dies right before revealing the President's whereabouts. Ashton regains consciousness in the ambulance and attacks Veronica, distracting her and Suarez as Anna runs into their path. Suarez swerves, causing the ambulance to flip over as Howard pulls Anna out of its way. Barnes runs to the ambulance where he sees Veronica lying dead. He shoots and kills Suarez before rescuing the President.

In the closing scene, a GNN news anchor states that the President is recovering and that the "lone assassin" responsible for the shooting and bombing was killed.

== Cast ==
- Dennis Quaid as Secret Service Agent Thomas Barnes
- William Hurt as President of USA, Henry Ashton
  - Hurt also portrays Ashton's body double
- Matthew Fox as Secret Service Agent Kent Taylor
- Eduardo Noriega as Enrique, a Policía Nacional officer
- Forest Whitaker as Howard Lewis, a curious American tourist in Salamanca
- Sigourney Weaver as Rex Brooks, a GNN executive producer
- Saïd Taghmaoui as Benwar Suarez / Sam, the leader of a Mujahideen Brigades affiliated terrorist cell
- Édgar Ramírez as Javier, a Spanish Special Forces soldier blackmailed into working for the terrorists
- Ayelet Zurer as Veronica, a member of the terrorist cell
- Rodrigo Cochero as Luis, a GNN cameraman aligned with the terrorists
- Richard T. Jones as Secret Service Agent Holden
- Bruce McGill as Phil McCullough, the White House Chief of Staff
- Zoe Saldaña as Angie Jones, a reporter for GNN
- Alicia Jaziz as Anna, a young girl attending the Salamanca summit
- Jose Carlos Rodriguez as De Soto, the Mayor of Salamanca
- Holt McCallany as Secret Service Agent Ron Matthews
- Leonardo Nam as Kevin Cross, a GNN producer
- James LeGros as Ted Heinkin, the National Security Advisor

== Production ==
=== Filming ===
In the original script, Rex Brooks was a male, and Howard Lewis was an overweight Eastern European. In Plotting an Assassination, a bonus feature on the DVD release of the film, director Pete Travis explained he cast Sigourney Weaver to give the film a strong female. When Forest Whitaker expressed interest in participating in the project, Travis welcomed the chance to work with him by Americanizing the character of Howard.

Originally scheduled for a 2007 release by Sony, the film began principal photography on June 18, 2006, in Mexico City. Locations included the Casa de los Azulejos, with some exteriors shot in Cuernavaca and Puebla. The film was shot during the height of Mexico's rainy season. Travis credited cinematographer Amir Mokri and the lighting crew for making it look like the twenty-minute segment portrayed in the film unfolded under clear and sunny skies, when in fact it frequently was overcast and drizzling.

U.S. Army veteran Ron Blecker helped the lead actors prepare themselves to play Secret Service agents. Quaid said they trained together for two weeks prior to shooting. One of the difficult elements of the filming were the car chase scenes. Quaid did most of the driving sequences himself except for the crashes. Quaid said of the script that "it really read so well that I felt if they could just put this on screen, it was going to work". Regarding the multiple performances of the same event, Quaid said he "played it the same way the entire time". He found the idea that audiences could "catch a different angle of that character that you couldn’t see before" an exciting aspect of the film.

Actor Matthew Fox said that "film can be a very tedious process" but showing so many different perspectives makes it even more tedious. Fox called Travis "a real actor's director" who "think[s] about the character from the point of view of the character". Fox believed his training for his part was instrumental in achieving the desired effect and that the accuracy of the film was important to Travis. He also said the film shows how different people can perceive events differently depending on various criteria, such as their agenda.

=== Soundtrack ===
The original motion picture soundtrack for Vantage Point was released by the Varèse Sarabande music label on February 26, 2008. The score for the film was composed by Atli Örvarsson, conducted by Nick Glennie-Smith, mixed by Alan Meyerson and performed by the Hollywood Studio Symphony. Dina Eaton edited the film's music.

Vantage Point: Original Motion Picture Soundtrack

Film score by Atli Örvarsson
- Released: 26 February 2008
- Length: 41:30
- Label: Varèse Sarabande

== Release ==
=== Theatrical run ===
The film had its world premiere in Spain on February 13, 2008. The next day, it premiered in Italy, Sweden and Switzerland. Other European markets in Portugal and Croatia had the film premiering on April 3. It went into general theatrical release in the U.S., Canada and Mexico on February 22. Certain Asian-Pacific markets; Australia and New Zealand saw the premiere of the film on March 13, while in Malaysia it screened the following day on March 14.

=== Home media ===
Following its cinematic release in theaters, the Region 1 widescreen edition of the film was released on DVD in the United States on July 1, 2008. Special features for the DVD include "Surveillance Tapes: Outtakes", interviews with the cast and crew titled "An Inside Perspective, Plotting an Assassination", "Coordinating Chaos" stunt featurette, and the director's commentary. Additionally, a two-disc Special Edition DVD was also released by Sony Pictures Home Entertainment on July 1, 2008. Viewers have the option of seeing the film in either anamorphic widescreen or fullscreen formats. Special features include "Surveillance Tapes: Outtakes", the "An Inside Perspective, Plotting an Assassination" feature, "Coordinating Chaos" stunt featurette, the director's commentary, and a digital copy of the film that can be downloaded to a PC with a DVD-ROM option or to a Sony PSP.

The widescreen hi-definition Blu-ray Disc version of the film was released on July 1, 2008. Special features include Surveillance Tapes: Outtakes, the "An Inside Perspective, Plotting an Assassination" feature, "Coordinating Chaos" stunt featurette, and the director's commentary. The disc also includes an exclusive "Vantage Viewer" feature, allowing for a tracking movement of each character's location and vantage point throughout the film. A UMD version of the film for the Sony PSP was released on July 1, 2008. The disc features dubbed, subtitled, and color widescreen format viewing options. A supplemental viewing option for the film in the media format of video on demand is available as well.

== Reception ==
=== Critical response ===
On Rotten Tomatoes the film has an approval rating of 34% based on 158 reviews, with an average rating of 4.9/10. The consensus critics reads, "Vantage Point has an interesting premise that is completely undermined by fractured storytelling and wooden performances." Metacritic assigned the film a weighted average score of 40 out of 100, based on 32 critics, which it describes as "mixed or average reviews". Audiences polled by CinemaScore gave the film an average grade of "B−" on an A+ to F scale.

"Vantage Point is at its best in the early going when it focuses on the Secret Service agent, whom Quaid plays with the intensity of a man trying to blast through doubt and fear by staying very, very angry. Quaid is so good that his performance ends up promising what the script can't deliver - a blazing portrait of an American professional, the sunburned man of action, whose inner torment can't stop him." wrote Mick LaSalle of the San Francisco Chronicle. Jim Lane, writing in the Sacramento News & Review, said, "It all winds up—or dribbles down—to yet another chase through crowded streets in commandeered cars, with an ending meant to be ironic but simply providing a crowning howler to all the Rube Goldberg nonsense." He emphatically believed, "with all the repetition and a modest 90-minute running time, they run out of ideas before they run out of film." Mick LaSalle in the San Francisco Chronicle wrote that the film "has a fractured and frustrating narrative." Unlike Akira Kurosawa's classic film Rashomon, which is structured around multiple retellings of the same event, LaSalle characterizes Vantage Point as "fairly pedestrian" and describes the multiple perspectives as "arbitrary, a gimmick." Claudia Puig of USA Today said the "various viewpoints don't quite link up" and the concept "seems initially intriguing, but it gets old after about the fifth time." She believed that like "many action-adventure movies that are short on plot intricacies but long on gimmick and explosives, too much is given away in the trailer." William Arnold of the Seattle Post-Intelligencer believed the film was "flat-out one of the more exciting and original gut-busters that Hollywood has produced in many a month. It's virtually all action, but the action is never mindless and it is full of marvelous surprises every step of the way." Richard Corliss of Time said that "Vantage Point scored with surprisingly robustness at the wickets, outperforming the predictions of industry analysts and seeming likely to be the weekend's No. 1 attraction." He said the film is "best seen as straightforward, sometimes harrowing melodrama, packed with mistaken identities, beautiful villains, a kindly tourist who can outrace the bad guys, and a lost little girl whom the film brazenly sends onto a highway full of speeding cars." David Denby of The New Yorker said, "Vantage Point is something remarkable—the ultimate case, perhaps, of a movie as a big whirling machine."

Writing for The Boston Globe, Ty Burr said the "rewind/retell gambit quickly grows tiresome" and the result of the film was "both clever and stupid - an interesting feat." James Berardinelli, writing for ReelViews, called the film a "fast-paced motion picture that fails the 'reality test' but maintains a certain intensity for its entire running length. It's entertaining in the same way that an episode of 24 is entertaining, but without the lead character shouting 'dammit!' every five minutes." Scott Foundas of The Village Voice said the film encompassed "multiple perspectives" that "are all foreplay, it turns out, for an orgiastic third-act car chase during which the movie's story threads converge in a way that makes Paul Haggis seem like a master of Balzacian realism." Foundas said the most exciting aspect of the film was that it was continually nearing its end.

With each of the perspectives, the story is skillfully and enticingly enhanced, and then the movie segues into an epic - and wonderfully complex - chase sequence that cuts between all the participants (and picks a few new ones in the process) as it rushes to an explosive conclusion.

— William Arnold, writing for the Seattle Post-Intelligencer

John Anderson of The Washington Post, stated that Akira Kurosawa's Rashomon "made it chic for filmmakers to create multiple-perspective movies and, since they aren't Kurosawa, drive us crazy." He came to the conclusion that "no amount of ripening time was going to help this gimmicky and ultimately harebrained movie." Similarly, Justin Chang wrote in Variety that the film circles "endlessly around a political assassination attempt and its violently contrived aftermath, the film proves every bit as crude, nerve-grinding and finally unsalvageable as the car accidents it keeps inflicting on its characters." He said the original holdover slated release for the film in 2007 by Sony was "unlikely to stop traffic around multiplexes despite its attention-getting cast, especially when poor word of mouth takes hold." Owen Gleiberman writing for Entertainment Weekly thought the film was "a pulse-pounding technological showman whose high-strung, quick-cut style might be described as JFK meets Paul Greengrass meets Jerry Bruckheimer. That said, it's not the plot that thickens — it's the pulp." He believed it had "a gripping premise that, for a while, at least, is grippingly executed."

=== Box office ===
The film premiered in cinemas on February 22, 2008, in wide release throughout the U.S.. During its opening weekend, the film opened in 1st place grossing $22.9 million at 3,149 cinemas. The film The Spiderwick Chronicles came in second place during that weekend grossing $13.1 million. The film's revenue dropped by 44% in its second week of release, earning $12.8 million. For that particular weekend, the film fell to 2nd place and screened in 3,150 theaters. The film Semi-Pro unseated Vantage Point to open in first place, grossing $15.1 million. During its final week in release, Vantage Point opened in 25th place with $234,042 in revenue. The film went on to top out in the US at $72.3 million through a 9-week theatrical run. Internationally, the film took in an additional $78.9 million for a combined worldwide total of $151.2 million. For 2008 as a whole, the film would cumulatively rank at a box office performance position of 43.

=== Awards ===
Following its cinematic release in 2008, Vantage Point won the Golden Trailer Award for Best Thriller. It also garnered a nomination from the Taurus World Stunt Awards in the category of Best Work With A Vehicle in 2009.

== TV series ==
In December 2020, it was announced that NBC was in the development stages of a TV series based on the film.

== See also ==
- Assassinations in fiction
- Flashback
- Hyperlink cinema
- Political decoy
- Rashomon effect
- Courage Under Fire, a 1996 film which also explores alternate accounts of a single event
