= Life in Plastic =

Studio album by Tom Aspaul
- Released: 30 May 2022
- Recorded: 2021–2022
- Genres: Pop; Europop; dance-pop; bubblegum pop
- Length: 32:06
- Label: 1609 (self-released)
- Producers: Gil Lewis; Tom Aspaul

Tom Aspaul chronology
| Black Country Discothèque (2021) | Life in Plastic (2022) | Cabin Fever (2025) |

Singles from Life in Plastic
- 1. "Let Them (It's All Love)" Released: 31 December 2021; 2. "Kiss It" Released: 25 February 2022; 3. "What Is Real Anymore?" Released: 15 April 2022; 4. "Listen 2 Nicole" Released: 26 May 2022; 5. "Thessaloniki (Remix)" Released: 6 October 2022; 6. "Love Me Right" Released: 14 October 2022

Life in Plastic is the second studio album by British singer-songwriter Tom Aspaul, released 30 May 2022, following his critically acclaimed debut album Black Country Disco. Named after a lyric taken from the song "Barbie Girl" by Danish-Norwegian dance-pop group Aqua, the album saw Aspaul team up with long-time collaborators, Gil Lewis and MNEK.

Described as a "monster pop record" and a "party from start to finish", Life in Plastic received acclaim for its consistency and "Y2K aesthetic", as well its eclectic influences. For The Independent, Isobel Lewis wrote: "Life in Plastic is a pure bubblegum pop record – but not without substance."

In support of the album, Aspaul embarked on his second headline tour — the Planet Fantastic Tour. Opening in Paris on 19 April 2023, the Planet Fantastic Tour included shows across Europe, Australia and North America for the first time.

== Background ==
Initially working as a songwriter for artists such as Becky Hill and Kylie Minogue, Tom Aspaul released his debut album, Black Country Disco in 2020. A follow up had been originally planned for release in 2021, but the success of Black Country Disco, the collaborative remix project Black Country Discothèque and Aspaul's first headline tour, The Revenge Body Tour, encouraged the singer to slow things down.

== Composition ==
The album is co-written and co-produced by Aspaul and London-based producer and songwriter, Gil Lewis, except two tracks, "What Is Real Anymore?" and "Millionaire" which were co-written with MNEK and a cover of "Hey! Amigo!", originally performed by French pop star Alizée.

The record was inspired by late 1990s and early 2000s Europop, trance and Eurodance music, noted for referencing artists such as "La Bouche, Ace of Base, Steps, Whigfield, ATC", the band who inspired its name, Aqua — as well as Romanian pop music, Balkan pop music and the Eurovision Song Contest.

Lyrically the album has been described as dealing with themes of escapism, identity and the "pressures placed on gay men".

== Release ==
The album's first single "Let Them (It's All Love)" was released on 31 December 2021, followed by a sci-fi inspired music video a week later. The second single, "Kiss It", was released in February 2022, shortly followed by a black-and-white music video, which was a continuation of the previous clip.

The final two singles before the album's release were the UK garage-inspired "What Is Real Anymore?" and an ode to Nicole Scherzinger, "Listen 2 Nicole". With the album's release itself being celebrated at London's Royal Vauxhall Tavern on 30 May 2022 followed by a performance at Mighty Hoopla on 3 June 2022. On 17 October 2022, the album was re-released as Life in Plastic, It's Expanded, a deluxe edition with eight new tracks and a music video for the song "Thessaloniki".

== Critical reception ==
Professional ratings
Review scores
| Source | Rating |
|---|---|
| Albumism | 4/5 stars |
| The Line of Best Fit | 4/5 stars |
| Retro Pop | 5/5 stars |

Life in Plastic received critical acclaim upon release, though not as unanimous as Aspaul's debut. It was criticised for being "less put together than Black Country Disco" and having moments "where songwriting, instrumentation, and lyrical content could be slightly improved", but in the same review, Aspaul is described as a "shining example of an independent artist making the music they want to make."

In a review for Albumism, Quentin Harrison describes the record as "Tom Aspaul levelling up" with particular praise for "Thessaloniki", "arguably one of his finest performances to date." In a five-star review for Retro Pop Magazine, "Effigy" is highlighted as "a stellar, trance-inspired number" and "like a sequel to his fan-favourite hit 'Traces'". In the same review, the album is touted as "further evidence that Tom Aspaul should by all accounts be one of the UK's biggest music stars."

=== Year-end lists ===
Life in Plastic on year-end lists
| Publication | List | Rank | Ref. |
|---|---|---|---|
| The Line of Best Fit | Staff Picks: The Year in Music | 14 | |
| Albumism | Albumism's 100 Best Albums of 2022 | 70 | |

== Track listing ==
Life in Plastic – LP, CD and cassette version
| No. | Title | Writer(s) | Producer(s) | Length |
|---|---|---|---|---|
| 1. | "Dial Up" | Tom Aspaul; Gil Lewis | Aspaul; Lewis | 0:36 |
| 2. | "Let Them (It's All Love)" | Aspaul; Lewis | Aspaul; Lewis | 3:03 |
| 3. | "Kiss It" | Aspaul; Lewis | Aspaul; Lewis | 3:13 |
| 4. | "What Is Real Anymore?" | Aspaul; Lewis; Uzoechi Emenike | Aspaul; Lewis | 3:11 |
| 5. | "Lisen 2 Nicole" | Aspaul; Lewis | Aspaul; Lewis | 3:19 |
| 6. | "Statues" | Aspaul; Lewis | Aspaul; Lewis | 2:48 |
| 7. | "Wake Up in the Sun" | Aspaul; Lewis | Aspaul; Lewis | 2:53 |
| 8. | "Thessaloniki" | Aspaul; Lewis | Aspaul; Lewis | 3:08 |
| 9. | "Millionaire" | Aspaul; Lewis; Emenike | Aspaul; Lewis | 3:02 |
| 10. | "Effigy" | Aspaul; Lewis | Aspaul; Lewis | 3:54 |
| Total length: | | | | 29:07 |

Life in Plastic – digital version (bonus track)
| No. | Title | Writer(s) | Producer(s) | Length |
|---|---|---|---|---|
| 11. | "Hey! Amigo! – Bonus" | Mylène Farmer; Laurent Boutonnat | Aspaul; Lewis | 2:59 |
| Total length: | | | | 32:06 |

Life in Plastic, It's Expanded – Deluxe Edition
| No. | Title | Writer(s) | Producer(s) | Length |
|---|---|---|---|---|
| 12. | "Thessaloniki" (Remix) | Aspaul; Lewis | Aspaul; Lewis | 4:14 |
| 13. | "Love Me Right" | Aspaul; Lewis | Aspaul; Lewis | 3:26 |
| 14. | "Something More (Keep It)" | Aspaul; Lewis | Aspaul; Lewis | 3:10 |
| 15. | "U Won't Care" | Aspaul; Lewis | Aspaul; Lewis | 3:08 |
| 16. | "Let Them (It's All Love)" (Extended Mix) | Aspaul; Lewis | Aspaul; Lewis | 7:05 |
| 17. | "Kiss It" (Extended Mix) | Aspaul; Lewis | Aspaul; Lewis | 6:04 |
| 18. | "Effigy" (Extended Mix) | Aspaul; Lewis | Aspaul; Lewis | 6:47 |
| 19. | "What Is Real Anymore?" (Acoustic) | Aspaul; Lewis; Emenike | Aspaul; Lewis | 2:56 |
| Total length: | | | | 68:56 |

Notes

- "Hey! Amigo!"is a cover of "Hey! Amigo!" by Alizée.

== Release history ==
Release formats
| Date | Format | Version | Label |
|---|---|---|---|
| 30 May 2022 | Digital download; streaming; vinyl; cassette; CD | Life in Plastic | 1609 |
| 17 October 2022 | Digital download; streaming | Life in Plastic, It's Expanded | 1609 |
