= Ayesha Harris =

American actress

- Born: September 1987 (age 38–39); Long Beach, California, U.S.
- Occupation: Actor
- Known for: Daisy Jones & the Six; The Pitt

Ayesha Harris (born September 1987) is an American actor known for her role as Bernie in Daisy Jones & the Six.

== Early life and education ==
Harris was born and raised in the Long Beach and Inland Empire areas of southern California.

== Career ==
Before becoming an actor, Harris owned and operated an all-female barbershop, Ninth Chapter Barbershop, catering to the LGBT community in the Fairfax District in West Hollywood. After running the shop for six years, the storefront closed in 2019 following a freak accident. In 2020, following the onset of the COVID-19 pandemic, Harris decided to pursue acting full-time.

Harris' first role was in 2017 in the series Two Sentence Horror Stories, and she did commercial work as well while working part-time and running the barbershop. Her other early roles included television spots in 2021 and 2022 on This Is Us, Abbott Elementary, Good Girls and The L Word: Generation Q. In 2022, she made her feature film debut in Tell It Like a Woman.

In 2023, Harris starred as Bernie, the love interest of Nabiyah Be's character Simone Jackson, in Daisy Jones & the Six. She is due to star in Code 3, helmed by Christopher Leone, and also appears in the Netflix comedy-drama series Glamorous.

In 2025, Harris was cast in The Pitt as night shift physician Dr. Parker Ellis. On 2 April 2026, it was announced that she will return for the show's third season upgraded to series regular.

== Filmography ==
Year	Title	Role	Notes
2017	Two Sentence Horror Stories	Eria	
2021	Good Girls	Bartender	
2021	The L Word: Generation Q	Jade	
2021	Abbott Elementary	UPS person	
2021	This Is Us	Lawyer	
2022	Tell It Like a Woman	Phyllis	
2023	Daisy Jones & the Six	Bernie	
2023	Glamorous	Britt	Main role
2024–25	Matlock	Vanessa Sampson	3 episodes
2024	August & Ebony	August	
2025	Code 3	Kim	
2025–present	The Pitt	Dr. Parker Ellis	Recurring role; 10 episodes
2026	Grey's Anatomy	Charlie	
