= Tom Aspaul =

English singer-songwriter (born 1986)

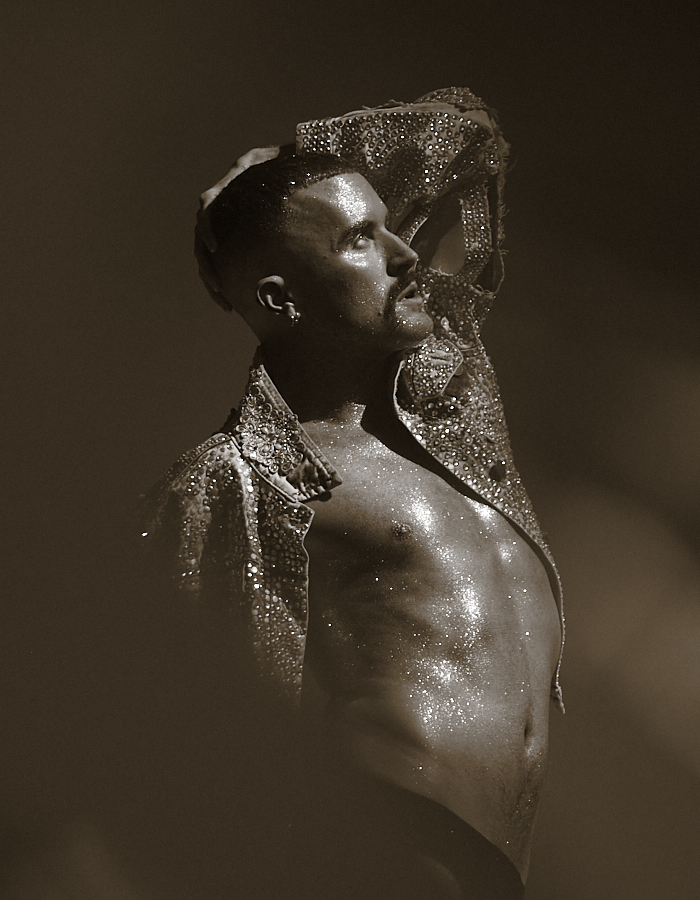
- Aspaul behind the scenes at the "Kiss It" music video, 2022

Background information
- Born: Thomas Paul Frederick Dutton; 16 September 1986 (age 40)
- Origin: Wolverhampton, West Midlands, England
- Genres: Pop; R&B; Europop; dance; disco
- Occupations: Singer, songwriter
- Years active: 2013–present
- Labels: On Repeat Records (2013); BLK&WHT (2016)

Thomas Paul Frederick Dutton (born 16 September 1986), known professionally as Tom Aspaul, is a British singer and songwriter from Wolverhampton. He released his debut album, Black Country Disco in 2020 to critical acclaim. His songwriting credits include Kylie Minogue, Snakehips, Celeste, and Becky Hill, among many others.

== Early life ==
He grew up on a council estate in the Black Country and is of part Romanichal descent. Writing songs from an early age, he would play ideas to family and friends, but was not involved in the local music scene. Instead, Aspaul went on to study Architecture, followed by a master's at Central Saint Martins College of Art and Design in London.

== Music career ==
=== Songwriting ===
Aspaul's career in music began in earnest while still studying at University in London. Encountering several A&Rs and music managers during his shifts working in an East London pub, Aspaul was eventually drafted to help write new material for the newly reformed Sugababes (then known as Mutya Keisha Siobhan) in 2012. In October 2013, after uploading a demo to SoundCloud, his song "Indiana" was signed to Little Boots' label, On Repeat Records. Produced by MNEK, the single attracted support from Popjustice and Pitchfork. The song was covered and renamed as "Feels So Good" by Australian singer Kylie Minogue. Minogue included it on her twelfth studio album, Kiss Me Once, with Aspaul contributing backing vocals. Aspaul signed his first publishing deal soon after.

In September 2015, Aspaul co-wrote and featured on XYconstant's single, "Do It Well", released on FFRR Records/Parlophone in September 2015. The track was featured on several 'Best of 2015' lists, eventually being nominated for the 2016 Popjustice £20 Music Prize, an annual prize awarded by music website Popjustice, recognising the "best British pop single of the previous year". During this time, often in five songwriting sessions a week, Aspaul's other credits include writing singles for AlunaGeorge, LIZ, The X Factor thirteenth series winner Matt Terry (and the runner-up Saara Aalto), Snakehips and Celeste, among others.

=== 2014–2019: Revelation, LEFT and collaborations ===
After the initial success of "Indiana", on 10 December 2014 Aspaul premiered "Good Together", his second official single and the first from his debut mixtape. The song, produced by GRADES, received support from Huw Stephens and was named by former BBC Radio 1 DJ, Zane Lowe as his "Next Hype". Revelation, the mixtape, was self-released via YouTube 19 May 2015, receiving acclaim from billboard. Also in 2015, he released his collaboration with Aeble (alias of producer Starsmith), "Better By Your Side", which went on to eventually amass over 20 million streams.

Aspaul released his first full EP, LEFT on BLK&WHT records on 4 November 2016, featuring work with frequent collaborators MNEK and GRADES. 2017 saw more collaborations, with Aspaul's vocals featuring on several EDM/dance and house tracks, including songs by Viceroy, Bronze Whale and Sleepy Tom, the latter of which became one of BBC Radio 1's "Dance Anthems".

=== 2019–2021: Black Country Disco and Black Country Discothèque ===
On 14 September 2019, Aspaul announced the beginning of a new project, Black Country Disco - a concept album named for the area in which he grew up and inspired by disco from the late 1970s and early 1980s. The album was self-released in September 2020 to critical acclaim, named "easily one of the best albums of the year". The record was supported by a short-film titled Black Country Disco: The Movie, shot in and around Wolverhampton.

Aspaul was awarded the PPL Momentum Fund in October 2020, sponsored by PRS, Spotify and Arts Council England to help fund a second studio album. He also performed the entirety of his debut album at Birmingham Symphony Hall. In April 2021, Aspaul released Black Country Discothèque, a remix album re-imagining each song on his debut LP, including collaborations with MNEK, Kim Wilde, Brendan Maclean and Bright Light Bright Light. Later that month, Aspaul announced Black Country Disco: The Book, published by Polari Press, documenting the conception, creation and release of the album. He embarked on his first sold-out UK headline tour in July 2021, The Revenge Body Tour.

To mark its fifth anniversary, Black Country Disco was reissued on vinyl in 2026.

=== 2021–2024: Life in Plastic ===
On 31 December 2021 Aspaul released the first single, "Let Them (It's All Love)", from his second album, Life in Plastic.

Released on 30 May 2022, and named after a lyric taken from the song "Barbie Girl" by Danish-Norwegian dance-pop group Aqua, the album saw Aspaul team up with long-time collaborators, Gil Lewis and MNEK. The record was inspired by late 90s and early 00s Europop, trance and Eurodance music, noted for referencing artists such as "La Bouche, Ace of Base, Steps, Whigfield, ATC" and the band who inspired its name, Aqua - as well as Romanian pop music, Balkan pop music and the Eurovision Song Contest.

Described as a "monster pop record" and a "party from start to finish", Life in Plastic received acclaim for its consistency and "Y2K aesthetic", as well its eclectic influences. For The Independent, Isobel Lewis wrote "Life in Plastic is a pure bubblegum pop record – but not without substance". In Line of Best Fit, Aspaul was praised as a "shining example of an independent artist making the music they want to make".

On 17 October 2022 the album was re-released as Life in Plastic, It's Expanded, a deluxe edition with 8 new tracks and a music video for the song "Thessaloniki".

In support of the album's release, Aspaul performed across the UK, North America and Europe, including Mighty Hoopla, the 2022 Commonwealth Games, held in Birmingham and his second headline tour, the Planet Fantastic Tour which opened in Paris on 19 April 2023.

=== 2024–present: Cabin Fever and Moustache ===
In November 2024, Aspaul released the first single from his third album, "Cabin Fever". The album, also titled Cabin Fever, was independently released on 19 May 2025 via digital and limited vinyl formats. The record, inspired by an unsettling LSD‑fueled Midsommar weekend in a remote cabin on the Stockholm archipelago, marked a shift toward introspective psychedelic pop with deeply personal and emotionally candid lyrics. Critics praised its mature tone and refined production, highlighting tracks like "That Girl" and "Drama" for their emotional depth and authenticity. Following the album's release, Aspaul embarked on a string of summer dates, including a stint supporting Kesha on the UK leg of her House of Kesha Tour.

In 2026, Aspaul released Moustache, his fourth studio album and the first instalment of a planned three-part project. Released on 24 July 2026, the Italo disco inspired album consists of eight tracks and was preceded by the singles "You Can Try Me" and "New Position".

== Artistry ==
Aspaul is a pop singer and songwriter, though his music has straddled pop, R&B and electronic/dance. Aspaul is noted for using vocal harmonies extensively and his songs often feature his own voice layered several times. His vocals have been described as having an "unapologetic queerness" as well as being "unique", "soulful", "smooth", "versatile" and "effortless". He frequently cites Rodney Jerkins, Janet Jackson and Jennifer Lopez among his favourite musicians, although more recently, the likes of La Roux, Empire of the Sun and Daft Punk have influenced his work stylistically - as well as Chic, Grace Jones and ELO.

== Other work ==
He launched a music and pop culture podcast, Bottle Pop with Tom Aspaul in 2017. He is the host, with fellow singer-songwriter guests including MNEK, Becky Hill, Siobhan Donaghy, Anita Blay and Clare Maguire; as well as music journalist guests such as Popjustice. Since 2018 Aspaul has been sporadically presenting on the internet only radio station, FUBAR Radio. In 2021, Aspaul was part of United Kingdom's jury in the Eurovision Song Contest 2021. On 31 December 2025, he launched his OnlyFans account.

== Personal life ==
Aspaul is gay. He lived in Thessaloniki, Greece as part of his master's degree.

== Discography ==
=== Studio albums ===
Title	Album details
Black Country Disco	Released: 14 September 2020; Formats: CD, digital download, LP, cassette
Life in Plastic	Released: 30 May 2022; Formats: CD, digital download, LP, cassette
Cabin Fever	Released: 19 May 2025; Formats: CD, digital download, LP
Moustache	Released: 24 July 2026; Formats: digital download, LP

=== Remix albums ===
Title	Album details
Black Country Discothèque	Released: 16 April 2021; Formats: Digital download, LP

=== EPs ===
Title	EP details
LEFT	Released: 4 November 2016; Label: BLK&WHT Records; Format: Digital download
Cabin Fever Dream	Released: 26 September 2025; Format: CD, Digital download

=== Mixtapes ===
Title	Mixtape details
Revelation	Released: 19 May 2015; Format: Digital download
Lamentations	Released: 11 December 2018; Format: Digital download

=== Songwriting credits ===
indicates a background vocal contribution

indicates an un-credited lead vocal contribution

indicates a credited vocal/featured artist contribution

Year	Artist	Album	Song	Co-written with
2014	Kylie Minogue	Kiss Me Once	"Feels So Good"	No additional writers
2015	Karen Harding	Say Something EP	"Those Girls"	Karen Harding, Daniel Traynor
2015	Little Boots	Working Girl	"Working Girl"	Viktoria Hesketh, Daniel Traynor
2015	Hannah Lucia	Non-album single	"Don't Hold Out"	Hannah Lucia, Thomas AD Fuller
2015	Alo Lee	Videos EP	"Videos"	Alo Lee, Liam Howe, Exmoor Emperor
2016	Alex Newell	Power EP	"Shame"	Karen Harding, George Tizzard, Richard Parkhouse
2016	AlunaGeorge	I Remember	"Mediator"	Aluna Francis, George Reid
2016	Liz	Cross Your Heart	"Want U to Hate Me"	Elizabeth Abrams, Shane Tremlin, Thomas Foley
2016	Aanysa	Non-album single	"Burn Break Crash" (with Snakehips)	Caroline Furoyen, Daniel Traynor
2017	Celeste	The Milk & the Honey EP	"Chocolate"	Celeste Waite, James Edward Jacob
2017	Joe Hertz	Non-album single	"Simple" (with Jones)	Joseph Hertz
2017	Charlotte OC	Careless People	"In Paris"	Charlotte O'Connor, Martin Sjølie
2017	GotSome	Non-album single	"I Don't Know" (featuring Lisa Kekaula)	Adam Gorsky, Alexander Holmes, Ian Griffiths, Thomas Griffiths, Rebecca Hill, Jimmy Hogarth, Lisa Kekaula
2017	Matt Terry	Trouble	"Try"	Matthew Terry, Daniel Shah, Skylar Adams
2018	Saara Aalto	Wild Wild Wonderland	"Queens"	Saara Aalto, Farley Arvidsson, Charlie Walshe
2018	Olivier Dion	Exposed	"Curious"	Sabina Ddumba, Daniel Traynor
2018	MOKS	Non-album single	"Do So Much" (featuring Vinchenzo)	Rijad Rahmouni, Carlos Vroljik, Aaron Gill, Daniel McDougall
2018	Mae Muller	Frankly EP	"Maybe"	Holly Muller, Anthony Esterly
2020	Louise	Heavy Love	"Villain"	Louise Redknapp, Hannah Robinson, Josef Page
2020	Jay Pryor	Non-album single	"Aside"	Jay Pryor, James Bairian, Jesse Thomas, Louis Castle
2021	Tia Kofi	Part 1: The Damage EP	"Outside In"	Victoria Hesketh, Gil Lewis
2021	Dionne Bromfield	Non-album single	"Silly Love"	Dionne Bromfield, Lewis Dransfield
2021	Becky Hill	Only Honest on the Weekend	"Waiting Not Looking"	Rebecca Hill, Oscar Hill
2022	Suki Waterhouse	I Can't Let Go	"Melrose Meltdown"	Lux Pyramid, Suki Waterhouse
2024	Andy C, Becky Hill	Believe Me Now?	"Indestructible"	Rebecca Hill, Andrew Michael Clarke, Ryan Ashley

== Tours ==
Supporting act

- Louise Heavy Love Tour (UK, 2020)
- Self Esteem I Tour This All The Time (UK, 2023)
- Dagny (UK, 2023)
- Kesha, House of Kesha (UK, 2025)

Headline

- The Revenge Body Tour (UK, 2021)
- Planet Fantastic Tour (UK, Europe, North America, Australia, 2023-4)
- Cabin Fever Live (UK, Europe, North America, 2025)

== Awards and nominations ==
Year	Nominee/Work	Award	Result
2016	"Do It Well" (featuring Tom Aspaul)	Popjustice £20 Music Prize	Nominated
2020	Tom Aspaul	PPL Momentum	Won
