= Brendan Maclean =

Australian singer-songwriter and actor

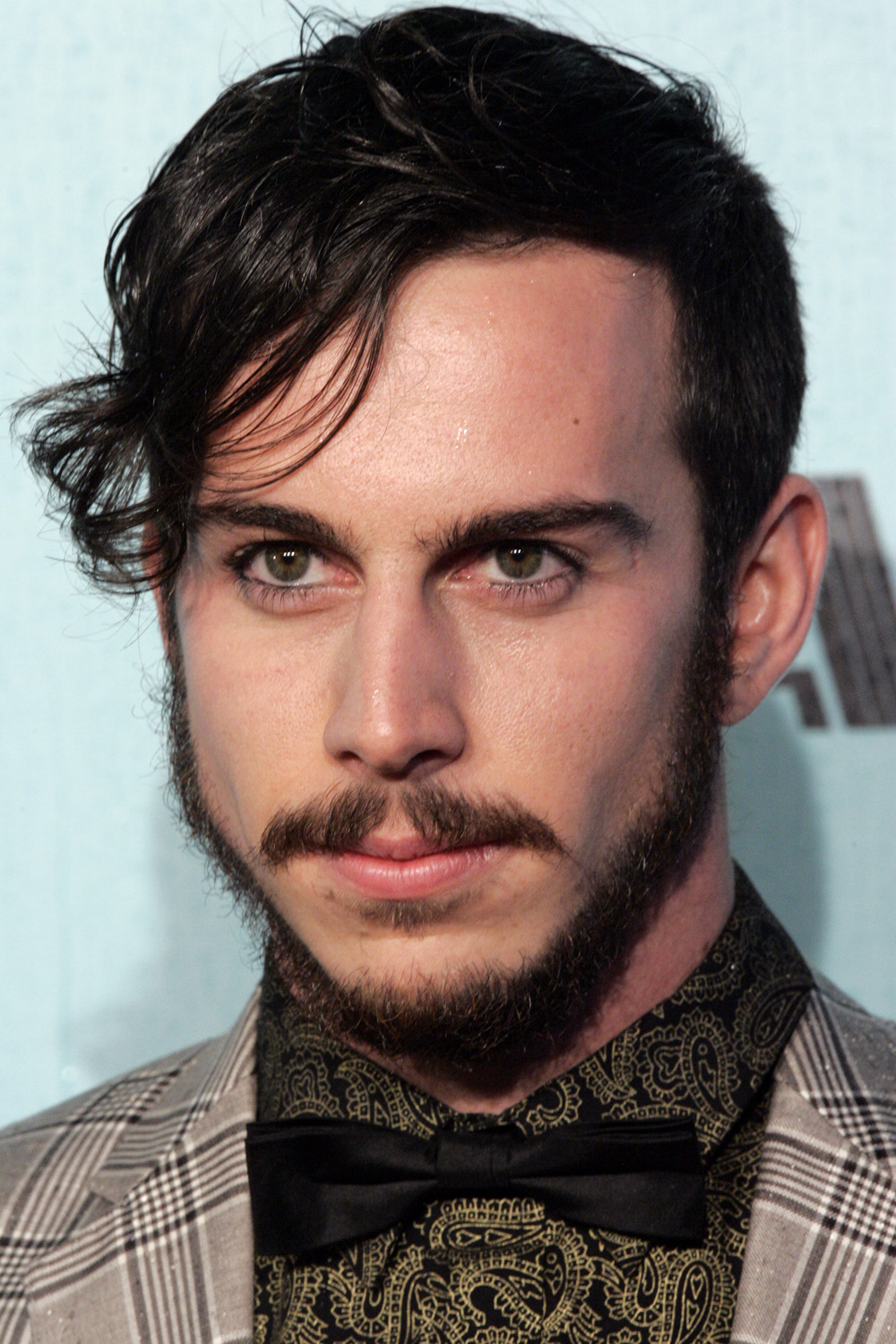
- Brendan Maclean at the Sydney premiere of The Great Gatsby in 2013

Background information
- Origin: Australia
- Genres: Pop
- Occupations: Singer-songwriter, actor, presenter
- Instruments: Piano, keyboards, vocals, guitar, ukulele
- Years active: 2010–present
- Label: Independent
- Website: brendanmaclean.bandcamp.com

Brendan Maclean is an Australian singer-songwriter and actor.

== Music ==
Brendan Maclean's debut EP, White Canvas, was uploaded to iTunes March 2010. In January 2014 he released a second EP, Population, produced by Paul Mac. Its lead single Stupid was featured by BuzzFeed and was heard as the Weather on Welcome to Night Vale, in episode 47, "Company Picnic." Soon after its release Maclean was signed to the Universal Music Publishing Group.

In 2015 Brendan released a third EP "Thought I'd Cry for You Forever", which included a collaboration with writer Neil Gaiman, and was nominated for an ARIA Award for his work with Marcia Hines on the Velvet Original Cast Soundtrack.

Maclean's first album funbang1 was released on 24 July 2016. It debuted at number 2 on the Australian Independent Album Chart. Three singles from the record were co-written with former Cobra Starship member Alex Suarez. Brendan's second album And The Boyfriends was released in 2019.

In 2025 his single Fine, written by Meg Washington for the film How to Make Gravy, won Best Original Song at the AACTA Awards and was featured on the film's ARIA winning Cast Album.

== "House of Air" ==
On 30 January 2017, Maclean uploaded an explicit short film accompanying his song "House of Air" to YouTube. The video went viral for its depictions of gay sexual acts including fisting, piss play, and scat play. The video was later removed from YouTube for breaching its terms of service, but is available on Vimeo as of June 2025.

House of Air won a Berlin Music Video Award and gained entry to SXSW 2018 Midnight Shorts. Huffington Post and New York included "House of Air" in their Best Music Videos of 2017, the latter including a warning, "This video should not be viewed in any public setting."

== Acting ==
Maclean is Ewing Klipspringer in the Baz Luhrmann adaptation of The Great Gatsby.

Maclean starred as Eli in the ABC Television comedy, Fucking Adelaide alongside Pamela Rabe, Kate Box, and Tilda Cobham-Hervey. It screened at the 2017 Adelaide Film Festival and later on ABC Television and iview.

In 2022, Maclean played the title roles in the Australian premiere production of Jekyll & Hyde: The Musical. He received widely positive reviews for his performance.

Maclean is Possum, a prison kitchen hand, in How to Make Gravy, a 2024 feature film inspired by the Paul Kelly song of the same name.

== Radio ==
From 2007 to 2013, Maclean was a regular music presenter for Australian national youth station Triple J.

== Discography ==
=== Albums ===
List of albums, with selected details
Title	Details
funbang1	Released: 2016; Label: Brendan Maclean
And the Boyfriends	Released: March 2019; Label: Brendan Maclean

=== Extended plays ===
List of EPs, with selected details
Title	Details
White Canvas	Released: 2010; Label: Brendan Maclean (BM001)
Population	Released: 2014; Label: Brendan Maclean
Thought I'd Cry for You Forever	Released: May 2015; Label: Brendan Maclean
For Him with Love	Released: October 2015; Label: Brendan Maclean
Solo	Released: September 2017; Label: Brendan Maclean

=== Notable recordings ===
- Various songs on Velvet: The Original Cast Album (2015)
- "Laura", Bat for Lashes cover with Amanda Palmer (2016)
- Bright Light Bright Light featuring Brendan Maclean - "Touchy" (2020)
- "Prime Time", The Tubes cover with Tom Aspaul (2021)
- "Fine", How to Make Gravy soundtrack. (2024)
- "I Know A Place", MUNA cover for Jimpa credits. (2025)

== Awards and nominations ==
=== AACTA Awards ===
The Australian Academy of Cinema and Television Arts Awards is an awards ceremony to celebrate the best of Australian films and television.

Year	Nominee / work	Award	Result	Ref.
2025	"Fine" (Megan Washington) by Brendan Maclean & The Prison Choir	Best Original Song	Won	
