= Revelation (EP) =

Mixtape by Tom Aspaul
- Released: 19 May 2016
- Recorded: 2014–15
- Genre: Pop; R&B; dance
- Length: 23:00
- Label: Self-released
- Producer: GRADES; Starsmith; Jakwob; Giraffage

Singles from Revelation
- 1. "Good Together" Released: 12 December 2014; 2. "New Moon" Released: 17 February 2015

Revelation is the debut mixtape primarily conducted by Tom Aspaul. It was self-released as one continuous YouTube video on 19 May 2015. It was the follow-on project from Aspaul's debut single "Indiana", which was produced by rising popstar MNEK, and features works from GRADES, Starsmith and Giraffage.

== Track listing ==
No.	Title	Writer(s)	Producer(s)	Length
1.	"Wolves" (Intro)	Tom Aspaul; Daniel Traynor	GRADES	0:38
2.	"Good Together"	Aspaul; Traynor	GRADES	3:15
3.	"Pioneer FM" (Interlude)	Aspaul	Tom Aspaul	1:26
4.	"New Moon"	Michael Flowers; Rodgers; Edwards; Aspaul	Starsmith	4:25
5.	"The Other Room"	Aspaul; PNut	Jakwob	4:56
6.	"Chocolate II"	Charlie Yin; Aspaul	Giraffage	3:55
7.	"I Luh Ya" (Interlude)	Aspaul	Tom Aspaul	3:17
8.	"Revelation"	Aspaul; Traynor	GRADES	3:28
9.	"Ripui" (Outro)			0:55
Total length:				23:00

Sample credits

- "Pioneer FM" contains samples of "Runaway" performed by Janet Jackson and "Why" performed by Carly Simon.
- "New Moon" is a cover of "Full Moon" performed by Brandy and contains samples of "Why" performed by Carly Simon.
- "I Luh Ya" contains samples of the I Luh Ya Papi performed by Jennifer Lopez.
- "Ripui'" contains samples of "Ripui" performed by Yma Sumac.
