= Milla Nova =

Ukrainian bridal fashion brand

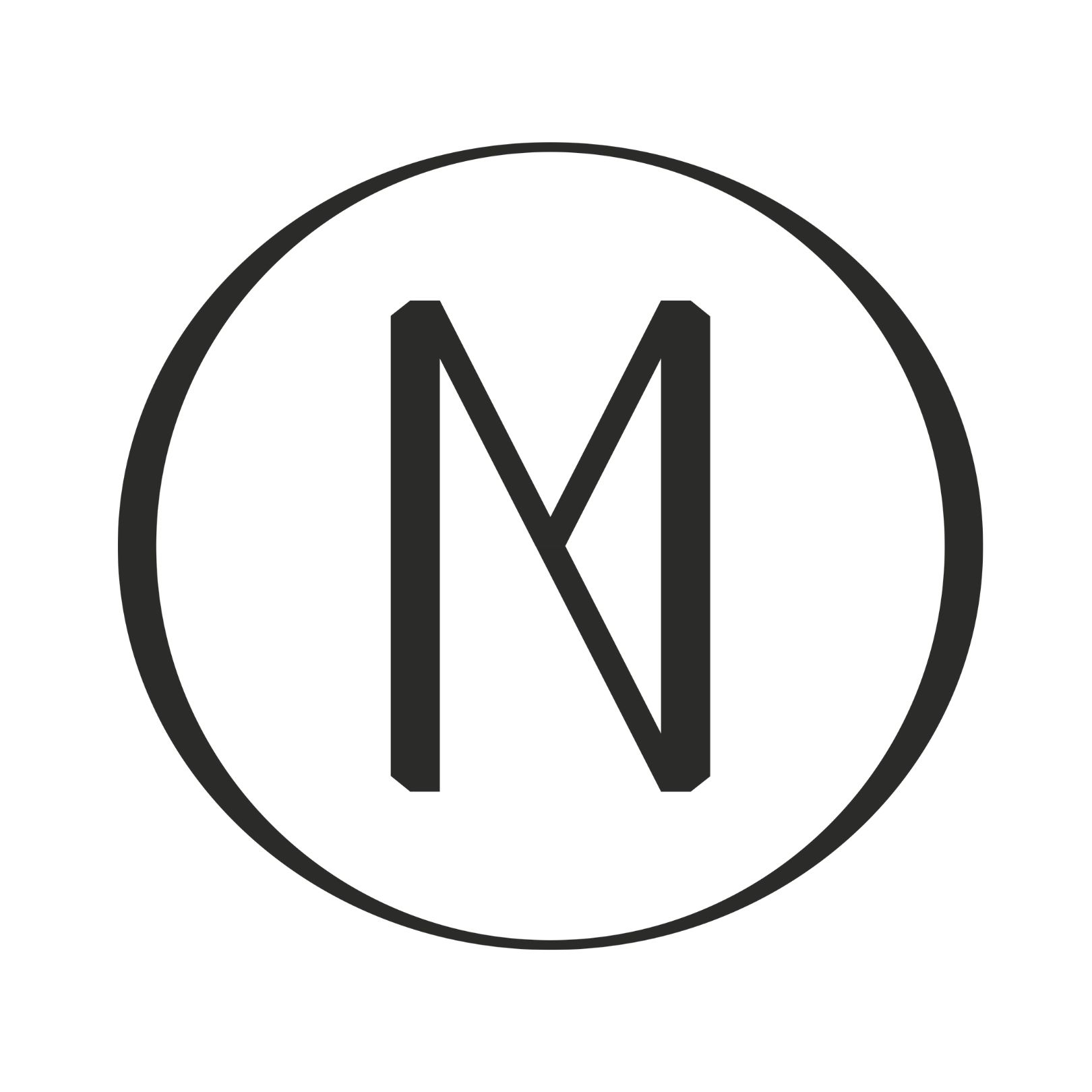
- Millanova logo
- Company type: Private
- Industry: Bridal fashion
- Founded: January 1, 2002
- Founders: Zoryana Senyshyn, Iryna Senyshyn
- Headquarters: Lviv, Ukraine; Warsaw, Poland
- Area served: Worldwide
- Key people: Ulyana Kyrychuk (CEO)
- Products: Wedding dresses, veils, capes, gloves, headbands, bridal accessories, eveningwear
- Brands: Milla Nova, Milla by Lorenzo Rossi, Milla
- Website: millanova.com

Milla Nova is an independent Ukrainian bridal fashion brand that specializes in wedding gowns and accessories. Headquartered in Lviv, Ukraine, the company operates internationally, with distribution in 50 countries.

== History ==
Milla Nova was founded in 2002 by sisters Zoryana and Iryna Senyshyn, who initially opened a small atelier in Lviv, Ukraine.

In 2017, Milla Nova opened its first mono-brand boutique in Lviv. Two years later, in 2019, the company held its first public showcase at the international fashion event in Barcelona. In 2020, Milla Nova launched an online store and introduced its sister brand, Milla — an eveningwear line for bridesmaids, mothers of the bride and groom, and wedding guests.

In 2022, the company Milla Nova debuted at the New York Bridal Fashion Week, becoming the first Ukrainian bridal brand to showcase in the event.

In 2023, Milla Nova introduced a couture collection that included unisex options. The company opened its flagship store in Warsaw, Poland, in March 2024.

The company presented an exclusive runway show in Barcelona in April 2025.

Milla Nova has collaborated with French novelist Géraldine Dalban-Moreynas, German fashion influencer Leonie Hanne, British actress Lucy Watson, and English television personality Jess Wright.

Milla Nova offers several bridal gown collections: White & Lace (focused on minimalistic and modern styles), Atelier (high-fashion-inspired designs), Royal (features fully embellished ballgowns), Main Line (combines traditional and modern elements), Milla by Lorenzo Rossi (avant-garde and sophisticated bridal fashion).

== Social initiatives ==
Milla Nova is a female-led company, with women making up over 95% of its workforce.

During the COVID-19 pandemic, the brand produced face masks and protective equipment for local medical workers in Ukraine. Following the Russian invasion of Ukraine, in 2022, Milla Nova relocated its production facilities and employees to Warsaw, Poland. In addition to continuing bridal production, the company began manufacturing military gear for Ukrainian Army soldiers and medical scrubs for health and medical workers in Ukrainian hospitals. It also donates 10% of online sales to Ukrainian aid initiatives.

In collaboration with ELLE Ukraine, the company highlighted the stories of Ukrainian veterans who married during the ongoing Russo-Ukrainian War.
