= Barry Levy =

American screenwriter (born 1972)

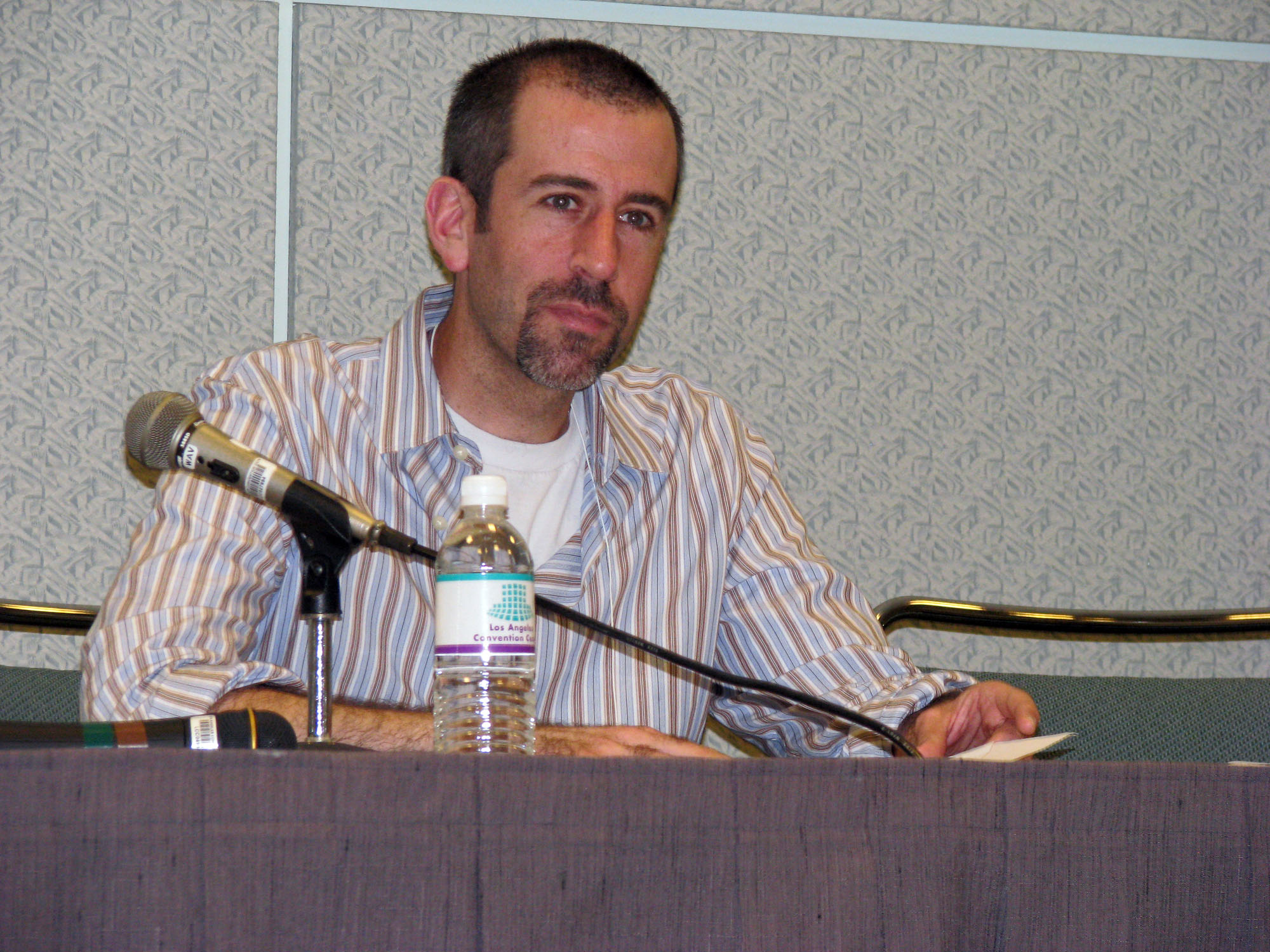
- Levy at the 2008 Screenwriting Expo
- Born: Barry Louis Levy; September 4, 1972 (age 53); Newton, Massachusetts, U.S.
- Education: Washington University in St. Louis
- Occupation: Screenwriter
- Spouse: Stacey Beth Davis (m. 2005)
- Writing career
- Notable work: Vantage Point

Barry Louis Levy (born September 4, 1972) is an American screenwriter best known as the writer of the 2008 film Vantage Point.

== Career ==
Despite studying history and psychology at Washington University in St. Louis, Missouri, Levy says he had always wanted to attend film school, and when he discovered the university lacked any kind of film program he decided upon an interdisciplinary major, and graduating summa cum laude after making a feature film for his thesis. He used this film to apply for a place at the University of Southern California's School of Cinematic Arts in the two-year masters Peter Stark Producing Program. After graduating, he became the assistant to the head of the animation company Nelvana's Los Angeles office, and within a year he had become a top development executive at the company. Just three years later, he resigned to pursue his own projects. All of his initial scripts, most of which were low-budget horror films, were unsuccessful; even those he did sell were produced direct-to-video. Picking up executive producer credits on the films Zolar and Black Irish, his first nine writing credits totaled less than the Writers Guild of America minimum of around $21,000. "I was so tired of writing what other people wanted me to write... 'You know what? I'm going to tell the story,'" Levy said about writing his breakthrough screenplay, Vantage Point. His inspiration for the spec script, which deals with the attempted assassination of an American president from multiple perspectives, came from the controversial John F. Kennedy assassination: "The question I asked myself was, if there had been someone on the grassy knoll when John F. Kennedy was shot, what would that story be and how would it break down?" Unlike his previous scripts, a bid was made for Vantage Point the morning after its submission to studios in October 2004, and several studios were interested.

Levy is currently working on a screenplay for the upcoming film Kung Fu, based on the 1970s television series of the same name. He has also been hired to write the screenplays Rainbow Six, Last Man and The Button Man: The Killing Game.

== Personal life ==
Levy was born in Newton, Massachusetts. His father is a pediatric cardiologist and his mother the dean of a liberal arts college with a PhD in biochemistry. He married Stacey B. Davis, the founder and president of Davis Public Relations and former Director of Publicity for NBC Studios, on August 21, 2005 in Malibu, California. He is Jewish and has taught Hebrew and social justice at Temple Israel in Los Angeles in between writing jobs, having attended Greenhills School in Ann Arbor, Michigan himself.
