= Miss Benny =

American actress, YouTuber and singer

- Miss Benny in 2026
- Born: February 19, 1999 (age 27); Dallas, Texas, U.S.
- Occupations: YouTuber; singer; actress
- Years active: 2010–present
- Musical career
- Genre: Synth-pop
- Instrument: Vocals

YouTube information
- Channels: BENNY; Ben J. Pierce; MISS BENNY
- Years active: 2011–present
- Genres: Music; make-up
- Subscribers: 293 thousand (BENNY); 206 thousand (Ben J. Pierce); 29.2 thousand (MISS BENNY)
- Views: 31.26 million (BENNY); 3.45 million (Ben J. Pierce); 999.2 thousand (MISS BENNY)
- Last updated: June 27, 2020

Benny Jean Pierce (born February 19, 1999), known professionally as Miss Benny, is an American actress, singer and YouTuber.

== Early life ==
Benny was born on February 19, 1999, and grew up in Denton, Texas. She lived as a closeted teenager before coming out. As she began posting on YouTube, she found an outlet with similar individuals in the online community. She befriended fellow YouTube artists Troye Sivan and Tyler Oakley. She is of Latin American descent.

== Career ==
Benny began posting on YouTube using various channels when she was 11 years old in 2010 as a way to feel less isolated and lonely. In 2012, she began posting under the YouTube channel, KidPOV. She began posting under her own name in 2016. She frequently discusses gender and identity. Benny has done makeup tutorials and collaborated with other media personalities including Tyler Oakley and James Charles. Her YouTube channel also includes humorous skits.

=== Music ===
In 2014, Benny released the song "Little Game". She wrote the lyrics and directed and produced the music video with assistance from Tumi Mphahlele. The song and video rebuff forcing children into traditional gender roles.

In 2016, Benny was cast as Smiley in season 2 of go90's Guidance. Also in 2016, Benny released the single "Boys Will Be Boys", which is about toxic masculinity. It features melodic tones, smooth vocals, and drum beats. Music critic Nic Kelly reviewed the song positively, describing its style as somewhere between Odesza and Drumaq. The song's music video was filmed and edited by YouTuber and filmmaker Chase vs Everything, and featured Kalama Epstein.

In 2017, Benny released the R&B single "Never Apart". She directed the video which was shot by Chase vs Everything.

==== Style ====
Benny names Bob Mizer as one of her aesthetic influences. She strives to create music that is glittery synth-pop, bubbly, and "very gay and very queer." Benny listens to pop musicians Charli XCX and Carly Rae Jepsen. She also listens to rap and hip hop.

=== Acting ===
In 2018, Benny appeared in the sitcom Fuller House as Casey, the show's first openly gay character. In 2023, she indirectly claimed in a TikTok video that Fuller House star Candace Cameron Bure had campaigned for her character's removal from the show due to her character's queer identity. Bure denied the claims. She was cast in the series Reverie in 2019.

In 2019, she was cast as the lead for The CW pilot Glamorous playing Marco, an "ambitious and creative gender-nonconforming teenager who uses makeup and fashion to let his queer self bloom." The show was then dropped and picked up by Netflix after the coronavirus pandemic. It premiered June 22, 2023. In an essay published in Time magazine, Benny revealed that the character will transition, alongside her own transition in real life.

Benny has been the voice of Angel in Craig of the Creek since season 4.

== Personal life ==
As of June 2023, Benny lives in Los Angeles, California. Benny is a transgender woman. She uses she/her pronouns. She has three older siblings who assist with aspects of video production, including crafting props and designing hair and makeup.

== Discography ==
=== Singles ===
- "Little Game" (2014)
- "Boys Will Be Boys" (2016)
- "Never Apart" (2017)
- "Rendezvous" (2019)
- "Every Boy" (2019)
- "That's My Man" (2019)
- "One Damn Good Mistake" (2019)
- "Break Away" (2023)

== Filmography ==
Year	Title	Role	Notes
2011	BrainSurge	Herself	Television
2016	Guidance	Smiley	Television
2018	Fuller House	Casey	Television
2021	Love, Victor	Mylo	Television
2021	American Horror Stories	Dee	Television
2022	Craig of the Creek	Angel (2nd voice)	Television
2023	Glamorous	Marco	Television

== See also ==
- LGBT culture in Dallas–Fort Worth
- LGBT culture in Los Angeles
- List of LGBT YouTubers
