= D4vd discography =

List of works by American singer

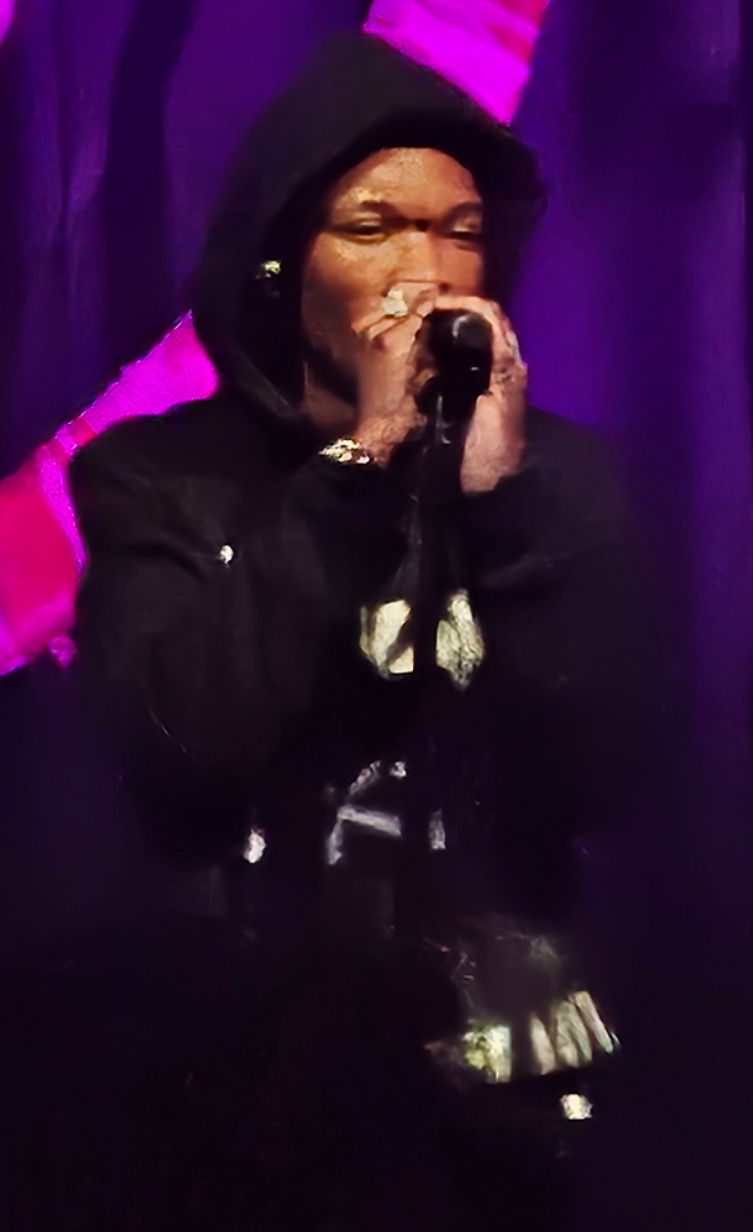
- D4vd performing at the Fonda Theatre in 2024
- Studio albums: 1
- EPs: 2
- Singles: 31
- Promotional singles: 2
- Music videos: 15

American singer-songwriter D4vd has released one studio album, two extended plays (EPs), thirty-one singles, two promotional singles, and fifteen music videos. Born in Queens, New York City, and raised in Houston, Texas, D4vd started creating experimental music to avoid copyright strikes on his Fortnite video game montages.

D4vd has received several awards in the past two years. "Here with Me" was nominated for Rolling Stone Sound of the Year at the 2023 Streamy Awards, and "Romantic Homicide" was nominated for Music Video (Independent) at the 14th Hollywood Music in Media Awards. Both tracks were also nominated for BMI Pop Awards in 2024.

== Studio albums ==
| Title | Details | Peak chart positions | | | | | |
| Title | Details | US | AUS | BEL (FL) | CAN | NOR | NZ |
|---|---|---|---|---|---|---|---|
| Withered | Released: April 25, 2025; Label: Darkroom, Interscope; Formats: LP, CD, digital download, streaming | 13 | 71 | 200 | 66 | 68 | 31 |

== Extended plays ==
| Title | Details | Peak chart positions | | | | | | Certifications |
| Title | Details | US | CAN | FIN | LTU | NOR | NZ | Certifications |
|---|---|---|---|---|---|---|---|---|
| Petals to Thorns | Released: May 26, 2023; Label: Darkroom, Interscope; Format: LP, digital download, streaming | 51 | 82 | 45 | 24 | 37 | 27 | MC: Platinum; RMNZ: Gold |
| The Lost Petals | Released: September 8, 2023; Label: Darkroom, Interscope; Format: Digital download, streaming | — | — | — | — | — | — | |
| Withering | Released: February 9, 2024; Label: Darkroom, Interscope; Format: Digital download, streaming | — | — | — | — | — | — | |
"—" denotes a recording that did not chart or was not released in that territory.

== Singles ==
=== As lead artist ===
List of singles as lead artist, showing year released and album name
| Title | Year | Peak chart positions | | | | | | | | | | Certifications | Album |
| Title | Year | US | US Alt. | AUS | CAN | IRE | LTU | NZ | SGP | UK | WW | Certifications | Album |
|---|---|---|---|---|---|---|---|---|---|---|---|---|---|
| "Run Away" | 2021 | — | — | — | — | — | — | — | — | — | — | | Non-album single |
| "You and I" | 2022 | — | — | — | — | — | — | — | — | — | — | | Petals to Thorns |
| "Life's a Dream" | 2022 | — | — | — | — | — | — | — | — | — | — | | Non-album singles |
| "Bleed Out" | 2022 | — | — | — | — | — | — | — | — | — | — | | Non-album singles |
| "It's That Time Again" | 2022 | — | — | — | — | — | — | — | — | — | — | | Non-album singles |
| "Decide" | 2022 | — | — | — | — | — | — | — | — | — | — | | Non-album singles |
| "More Than Just Friends" | 2022 | — | — | — | — | — | — | — | — | — | — | | Non-album singles |
| "Dirty Secrets" | 2022 | — | — | — | — | — | — | — | — | — | — | | Non-album singles |
| "Take Me to the Sun" | 2022 | — | — | — | — | — | — | — | — | — | — | | Non-album singles |
| "Fly Away" | 2022 | — | — | — | — | — | — | — | — | — | — | | Non-album singles |
| "Separate" | 2022 | — | — | — | — | — | — | — | — | — | — | | Non-album singles |
| "Never Again" | 2022 | — | — | — | — | — | — | — | — | — | — | | Non-album singles |
| "Wasting Your Time" | 2022 | — | — | — | — | — | — | — | — | — | — | | Non-album singles |
| "Right Now" | 2022 | — | — | — | — | — | — | — | — | — | — | | Non-album singles |
| "DTN" | 2022 | — | — | — | — | — | — | — | — | — | — | | Non-album singles |
| "Romantic Homicide" | 2022 | 33 | 3 | 40 | 32 | 27 | 13 | 21 | 18 | 22 | 30 | RIAA: 3× Platinum; ARIA: 2× Platinum; BPI: Platinum; MC: 4× Platinum; RMNZ: 2× Platinum | Petals to Thorns |
| "Here with Me" | 2022 | 60 | 4 | 44 | 44 | 54 | 54 | 40 | 7 | 34 | 34 | RIAA: 2× Platinum; ARIA: 2× Platinum; BPI: Platinum; MC: 3× Platinum; RMNZ: 2× Platinum | Petals to Thorns |
| "Placebo Effect" | 2023 | — | — | — | — | — | — | — (Note: "Placebo Effect" did not enter the NZ Top 40 Singles Chart, but peaked at number 38 on the NZ Hot Singles Chart.) | — | — | — | | Non-album single |
| "Worthless" | 2023 | — | — | — | — | — | — | — (Note: "Worthless" did not enter the NZ Top 40 Singles Chart, but peaked at number 25 on the NZ Hot Singles Chart.) | — | — | — | | Petals to Thorns |
| "Sleep Well" | 2023 | — | — | — | — | — | — | — (Note: "Sleep Well" did not enter the NZ Top 40 Singles Chart, but peaked at number 22 on the NZ Hot Singles Chart.) | — | — | — | MC: Gold | Petals to Thorns |
| "Don't Forget About Me" | 2023 | — | — | — | — | — | — | — | — | — | — | | Petals to Thorns |
| "The Bridge" | 2023 | — | — | — | — | — | — | — (Note: "The Bridge" did not enter the NZ Top 40 Singles Chart, but peaked at number 35 on the NZ Hot Singles Chart.) | — | — | — | | Petals to Thorns |
| "Notes from a Wrist" | 2023 | — | — | — | — | — | — | — | — | — | — | | The Lost Petals |
| "Call Me Revenge" (with 21 Savage) | 2023 | — | — | — | — | — | — | — | — | — | — | | Call of Duty: Modern Warfare III |
| "Leave Her" | 2024 | — | — | — | — | — | — | — (Note: "Leave Her" did not enter the NZ Top 40 Singles Chart, but peaked at number 31 on the NZ Hot Singles Chart.) | — | — | — | | Withering |
| "2016" | 2024 | — | — | — | — | — | — | – | — | — | — | | Withering |
| "My House Is Not a Home" | 2024 | — | — | — | — | — | — | — (Note: "My House Is Not a Home" did not enter the NZ Top 40 Singles Chart, but peaked at number 14 on the NZ Hot Singles Chart.) | — | — | — | | Non-album single |
| "Feel It" | 2024 | 75 | — | 64 | 65 | 47 | — | — (Note: "Feel It" did not enter the NZ Top 40 Singles Chart, but peaked at number 12 on the NZ Hot Singles Chart.) | — | 49 | 87 | RIAA: Gold; BPI: Gold; MC: Platinum; RMNZ: Platinum | Invincible (Season 2 Soundtrack) and Withered |
| "There Goes My Baby" | 2024 | — | — | — | — | — | — | — (Note: "There Goes My Baby" did not enter the NZ Top 40 Singles Chart, but peaked at number 33 on the NZ Hot Singles Chart.) | — | — | — | | Non-album singles |
| "I'd Rather Pretend" (with Bryant Barnes) | 2024 | — | — | — | — | — | — | — (Note: "I'd Rather Pretend" did not enter the NZ Top 40 Singles Chart, but peaked at number 19 on the NZ Hot Singles Chart.) | — | — | — | | Non-album singles |
| "Where'd It Go Wrong?" | 2024 | — | — | — | — | — | — | — | — | — | — | | Withered |
| "One More Dance" | 2025 | — | — | — | — | — | — | — | — | — | — | | Withered |
| "Crashing" (with Kali Uchis) | 2025 | — | — | — | — | — | — | — (Note: "Crashing" did not enter the NZ Top 40 Singles Chart, but peaked at number 11 on the NZ Hot Singles Chart.) | — | — | — | | Withered |
| "What Are You Waiting For" | 2025 | — | — | — | — | — | — | — (Note: "What Are You Waiting For" did not enter the NZ Top 40 Singles Chart, but peaked at number 16 on the NZ Hot Singles Chart.) | — | — | — | | Withered |
| "Is This Really Love?" | 2025 | — | — | — | — | — | — | — (Note: "Is This Really Love?" did not enter the NZ Top 40 Singles Chart, but peaked at number 20 on the NZ Hot Singles Chart.) | — | — | — | | Withered |
| "Always Love" (featuring Hyunjin) | 2025 | — | — | — | — | — | — | — (Note: "Always Love" did not enter the NZ Top 40 Singles Chart, but peaked at number 29 on the NZ Hot Singles Chart.) | — | — | — | | Non-album singles |
| "L.O.V.E.U" (featuring Hannah Bahng) | 2025 | — | — | — | — | — | — | — | — | — | — | | Non-album singles |
| "Locked & Loaded" | 2025 | — | — | — | — | — | — | — | — | — | — | | Non-album singles |
"—" denotes a recording that did not chart or was not released in that territory.

=== As featured artist ===
List of singles as a featured artist, showing year released and album name
| Title | Year | Album |
|---|---|---|
| "Summer Uptown" (JasonTheWeen featuring D4vd) | 2025 | Non-album single |
| "Tangerine" (Damiano David featuring D4vd) | 2025 | Funny Little Fears |

== Other charted songs ==
List of other charted songs, showing year released and album name
| Title | Year | Peak chart positions | Album |
| Title | Year | NZ Hot | Album |
|---|---|---|---|
| "This Is How It Feels" (with Laufey) | 2023 | 31 | Petals to Thorns |
| "Remember Me" | 2024 | 12 | Arcane League of Legends: Season 2 |
