= Data Romance =

Canadian musical duo

- Origin: Vancouver, British Columbia
- Genres: Electro, Indie
- Years active: 2009–2014
- Label: Street Quality Entertainment
- Members: Stint; Amy Kirkpatrick

Data Romance is a Vancouver based electro-indie duo started by Ajay Bhattacharyya, instrumentalist-producer, and Amy Kirkpatrick, singer/lyricist. Showcasing the modern direction of electronic music, the duo signed to Street Quality Entertainment, the Canadian-based record label, releasing a self-titled EP of four songs in June 2011. Having toured with the IDentity Festival, Data Romance has released a single titled "The Deep", which has been featured in NME and Filter Magazines as well as the BBC Radio 1 program. The duo has been likened to The xx, Bat for Lashes, Lykke Li and Florence and the Machine. The pair are currently on indefinite hiatus.

== History ==
Both Victoria natives, Ajay Bhattacharyya and Amy Kirkpatrick, aged 25 (in 2011), have been playing together since 2009. They first met at the Lucky Bar, home to a bustling and tight-knit community of musicians and fans, where Bhattacharyya filled in as a drummer for Kirkpatrick when she was touring her singer/songwriter act throughout coffee houses in Victoria. After both moving to Vancouver, Kirkpatrick worked as a lighting technician at many well-respected clubs in the city while Bhattacharyya studied sound design for film under Robert Grieve, with mentoring from Craig Berkey. As a musical duo, Bhattacharyya and Kirkpatrick called themselves Names, but later rebranded themselves Data Romance, a name which was derived from a song by Berlin techno icon Ellen Allien. Together, their work experiences have influenced their music and live performances, adding to the "soundtrack-like" vibe and highly visual live show.

Data Romance signed to Street Quality Entertainment in September 2010. The duo has put out all of its releases under the label's name. The first is an original soundtrack called Life Cycles released in January 2011. Their follow up EP, self-titled, released in June of the same year debuts their single (and music video), "The Deep". The EP and single have been featured on NME, Filter and Zane Lowe's Radio 1 BBC program.

On September 18, 2012, Data Romance released their first single, "Caves", along with a remix bundle on iTunes.

Data Romance released their first full-length album, Other, on February 19, 2013.

After the debut album was released, Ajay Bhattacharyya worked as an independent songwriter and record producer under his own stage name Stint, away from the "Data Romance" project. His first major appearance was with Carly Rae Jepsen on the song "LA Hallucinations", which was released on Jepsen's 2015 studio album, entitled E-MO-TION. This sparked his collaboration with NAO on the song "Girlfriend", which was released off of her debut studio album, entitled For All We Know, and with AlunaGeorge on the songs "Jealous" and "Wanderlust", which were released off of the duo's second studio album, entitled I Remember. He then went on to produce majority of the tracks on Gallant's critically acclaimed debut album Ology.

== Distribution advancements ==
Data Romance showcases the utilization of new or existing technologies in unique ways, such as Bluetooth downloads at concerts, created by their marketing team at The Found Group.

== Discography ==
=== Studio albums ===
Title	Album details
Other	Released: February 19, 2013; Label: Street Quality Entertainment; Formats: CD, LP, Digital download
No Reason	Released: June 18, 2021; Label: LOKRUMENTAL; Formats: Digital download

=== EPs ===
Title	Album details
Data Romance EP	Released: June 7, 2011; Label: Street Quality Entertainment; Formats: CD, LP, Digital download
Caves (Remixes)	Released: September 13, 2012; Label: Street Quality Entertainment; Formats: Digital download

=== Soundtrack albums ===
Title	Album details
Life Cycles (Original Soundtrack)	Released: January 11, 2011; Label: Street Quality Entertainment; Formats: CD, Digital download

== Music videos ==
THE DEEP MUSIC VIDEO

- Released: 30 May 2011
- Format: Digital
- Label: Street Quality Entertainment
