= And Then Life Was Beautiful =

Studio album by Nao
- Released: 24 September 2021
- Genre: R&B
- Length: 45:13
- Label: RCA; Little Tokyo; Sony
- Producer: LOXE; D'Mile; Stint; Sarz; Scribz Riley; Jonah Stevens; GRADES; George Moore; Ari PenSmith; Maths Time Joy

Nao chronology
| Saturn (2018) | And Then Life Was Beautiful (2021) |

Singles from And Then Life Was Beautiful
- 1. "Woman" Released: 24 August 2020; 2. "Antitode" Released: 7 January 2021; 3. "Messy Love" Released: 23 June 2021; 4. "And Then Life Was Beautiful" Released: 29 July 2021; 5. "Wait" Released: 12 August 2021

And Then Life Was Beautiful is the third studio album by English singer Nao. The album was released on 24 September 2021 through Little Tokyo Recordings and RCA Records.

== Critical reception ==
Professional ratings
Aggregate scores
| Source | Rating |
|---|---|
| Metacritic | 85/100 |
Review scores
| Source | Rating |
| All Music | 4/5 stars |
| The Guardian | 4/5 stars |
| NME | 5/5 stars |
| Pitchfork | 7.5/10 |
| Clash | 8/10 |

And Then Life Was Beautiful was met with universal acclaim from music critics and received a score of 85 out of 100 on review aggregator Metacritic based on nine critics' reviews.

Reviewing the album for AllMusic, Andy Kellman observed "the generally softer and sweeter backdrops, which lean toward modern adult contemporary R&B and at times are plain, allow Nao to do more with her voice, a lithe soprano that glides, swoops, and flutters without strain". Alexis Petridis of The Guardian commended the album by stating the "mood never feels trite on And Then Life Was Beautiful, but oddly infectious instead, perhaps because the songs are really strong, the lyrics admirably uncliched." Writing for NME, Kyann-Sian Williams felt the album "captures a sense of healing, and offers hope" and labelled it as "a true celebration of R&B".

Dylan Green of Pitchfork praised the "varied sonic palette" of the album. He noted that while And Then Life Was Beautiful doesn't completely reinvent Nao's style, the album is a significant milestone in her journey towards self-actualization. Amelia Kelly of Clash lauded the album by stating that "the gorgeous vocals, the radiant tones, the graceful guitar – manifests enlightened bliss. The expertly blended transitions between each track transform them into puzzle pieces that fit smoothly together."

The Independent included the album in their list of 20 most underrated albums at number 12.

== Track listing ==
And Then Life Was Beautiful track listing
| No. | Title | Writer(s) | Producer(s) | Length |
|---|---|---|---|---|
| 1. | "And Then Life Was Beautiful" | Neo Joshua; Rowan Perkins; Andrew Vickery; Nicola Sipprell | LOXE | 3:23 |
| 2. | "Messy Love" | Joshua; Dernst Emile II | D'Mile | 3:35 |
| 3. | "Glad That You're Gone" | Joshua; Dayyon Alexander; Ajay Bhattacharyya | Stint | 3:33 |
| 4. | "Antidote" (featuring Adekunle Gold) | Joshua; Adekunle Kosoko; Osaretin Osabuohien; Stacy Barthe | Sarz | 3:22 |
| 5. | "Burn Out" | Joshua; Nija Charles; Jonah Stevens; Leyla Fahm; Michael Orabiyi | Scribz Riley; Stevens | 3:19 |
| 6. | "Wait" | Joshua; Alexander | LOXE; GRADES | 3:10 |
| 7. | "Good Luck" (featuring Lucky Daye) | Joshua; Dustin Bowie; Perkins; Dan Gulino; Daniel John See; David Debrandon Brown; Jim Wood | LOXE | 3:04 |
| 8. | "Nothing's for Sure" | Joshua; Alex Bonfanti; Sipprell; Graham Godfrey; Miles James | GRADES | 4:17 |
| 9. | "Woman" (featuring Lianne La Havas) | Joshua; La Havas; Perkins; Vickery; Dayo Olatunji; Alexander | LOXE | 3:11 |
| 10. | "Better Friend" | Joshua; Traynor | GRADES | 3:21 |
| 11. | "Postcards" (featuring serpentwithfeet) | Joshua; Josiah Wise; George Moore | Moore | 3:27 |
| 12. | "Little Giants" | Joshua; Ari PenSmith; Alex Blake; Nathaniel Warner | PenSmith; Moore | 4:00 |
| 13. | "Amazing Grace" | Joshua; Timothy Worthington | Maths Time Joy | 3:26 |
| Total length: | | | | 45:13 |

== Charts ==
Chart performance for And Then Life Was Beautiful
| Chart (2021) | Peak position |
|---|---|
| UK Albums (OCC) | 63 |
| UK R&B Albums (OCC) | 1 |

== Release history ==
Release dates and formats for And Then Life Was Beautiful
| Region | Date | Format(s) | Edition | Label | Ref. |
|---|---|---|---|---|---|
| Various | 24 September 2021 | CD; digital download; LP; streaming | Standard | RCA Records | |
