= Petals to Thorns =

2023 extended play by D4vd

EP by D4vd
- Released: May 26, 2023
- Recorded: 2022–2023
- Studios: D4vd's sister's bedroom closet (Houston, Texas; tracks 1, 2, 4–9)
- Genres: Indie pop; alternative R&B; bedroom pop; indie rock
- Length: 28:48
- Labels: Darkroom; Interscope
- Producers: Matt Bartkus; Dan Darmawan; grayskies; Robin Hannibal; Michael Harrison; Chris Marek; Nextime; Casey Smith; Spencer Stewart; Stint; Sofía Valdés; Evan Wise

D4vd chronology
Petals to Thorns (2023)	The Lost Petals (2023)

Singles from Petals to Thorns
- 1. "You and I" Released: January 8, 2022; 2. "Here with Me" Released: July 17, 2022; 3. "Romantic Homicide" Released: July 20, 2022; 4. "Worthless" Released: March 9, 2023; 5. "Sleep Well" Released: April 13, 2023; 6. "Don't Forget About Me" Released: May 18, 2023

Petals to Thorns is the debut extended play (EP) by the American singer-songwriter D4vd (David Anthony Burke). Darkroom and Interscope Records released it on May 26, 2023, followed in September by the five-track companion EP The Lost Petals. Burke began making music in late 2021 on the iPhone app BandLab inside his younger sister's closet in Houston, Texas, after his Fortnite gameplay montages on YouTube repeatedly received copyright strikes. He recorded eight of the nine songs on Petals to Thorns on his phone in that closet over instrumentals by Dan Darmawan, Spencer Stewart, Stint, Robin Hannibal, and friends from his Fortnite circle; the Icelandic-Chinese singer Laufey appears on the sole studio-recorded track.

Petals to Thorns combines indie pop, alternative R&B, bedroom pop, and indie rock with chamber pop, dream pop, vocal jazz, post-punk, shoegaze, and pop-punk. Burke sequenced the tracklist to follow a romance from infatuation to heartbreak—comparing its arc to grabbing a white rose by the petals and being pricked by its thorns—with lyrics about unrequited love, self-doubt, and psychological illusions. Its music videos introduce It4mi, a blindfolded, blood-stained alter ego who torments Burke's stage persona. The EP contains his 2022 singles "Here with Me" and "Romantic Homicide", both of which entered the top 40 of the US Billboard Hot 100 and passed 500 million Spotify streams before the EP's release. Four other tracks—"You and I", "Worthless", "Sleep Well", and "Don't Forget About Me"—were also released as singles beforehand. Burke supported the EP in 2023 with the headlining Petals to Thorns Tour, a Fuji Rock Festival set, a Jimmy Kimmel Live! performance, and an opening slot on SZA's SOS Tour.

Critics and music journalists praised Burke's vocals and range across genres on Petals to Thorns, which appeared on Spin's list of the best EPs of 2023, though OndaRock criticized parts of it as formulaic and overly polished. The EP debuted at number 105 on the US Billboard 200 in June 2023, charted in Finland, Lithuania, New Zealand, and Norway, and was certified platinum in Canada and gold in New Zealand and Poland. After the remains of 14-year-old Celeste Rivas Hernandez were found in Burke's Tesla in September 2025, increased streaming sent Petals to Thorns to number 51 on the Billboard 200, number 7 on Top Alternative Albums, number 13 on Top Rock & Alternative Albums, and number 82 in Canada. Interscope dropped Burke later that year after he became a suspect in the police investigation. Following his April 2026 arrest and first-degree murder charge—to which he pleaded not guilty—Laufey had "This Is How It Feels" removed from streaming platforms, and the EP was reissued as an eight-track release.

== Background and recording ==
David Anthony Burke grew up in a Christian household in Queens, New York, where he had two brief stints in his church choir and was only allowed to listen to gospel music until age 13. After the eighth grade, his family moved to Houston, Texas, so his mother could homeschool him. Burke wanted to become a professional Fortnite player. He modeled his YouTube gameplay montages on the streamer Ninja under the alias Limit Ant and gained over 50,000 subscribers and 15 million views. Watching other players' videos introduced him to indie bands such as the Neighbourhood, Arctic Monkeys, Fleet Foxes, and Wallows. When YouTube repeatedly took down his videos in November 2021 for using copyrighted songs by Justin Bieber, SZA, and the Kid Laroi—costing him the ad revenue he was saving to upgrade his gaming computer—he complained to his mother, who suggested he make his own background music. The next day, he looked up how to make music on a phone and downloaded BandLab. "I didn't even watch a YouTube tutorial", he told NME of figuring out its stock presets, EQ, and reverb on his own. He used Apple EarPods inside his six-year-old sister's walk-in closet, where hanging clothes helped deaden the room's sound, and made his first song, "Run Away", on December 1, 2021.

Releasing music as D4vd, Burke recorded his second song, "You and I", in January 2022 for a Fortnite montage. Because it was royalty-free, other gamers used it in their clips, and it spread on Twitter and YouTube into the top 50 of SoundCloud's indie chart. He next built a following of 500,000 on TikTok by posting sped-up, high-pitched "chipmunk" covers such as Beyoncé's "Blue". "I used the fan base that I gained off of a gimmick to propel my actual music", he told Variety. Taking a short break from Fortnite, Burke wrote "Romantic Homicide", "Here with Me", and "Placebo Effect" in a single week. He had scrapped three earlier versions of "Romantic Homicide"—including a hip-hop verse and a happy version—over an instrumental he found on YouTube, and he initially disliked the finished track enough to record "Here with Me" in its place. Once a six-hour TikTok snippet of "Romantic Homicide" drew 750,000 views, however, he released both tracks via DistroKid in July 2022. Josh Marshall of the management firm Mogul Vision, who had spotted Burke on SoundCloud earlier, flew to Houston the next day to meet him and his parents—who initially suspected the outreach was a scam—at a Panera Bread restaurant. In August 2022, before graduating from high school, Burke signed a licensing deal with Darkroom and Interscope Records and a management contract with Marshall and Robert Morgenroth.

Burke recorded eight of the nine songs on Petals to Thorns inside his sister's bedroom closet. Mimicking guitar parts with his voice and tapping a pencil against the wall for percussion, he worked quickly: "My record is, what, 10 songs? I can make 10 songs in one night." His label booked professional studio sessions—including with Jim-E Stack in Los Angeles and at Alicia Keys's Jungle City Studios in New York City—but Burke felt uneasy around other people and unfamiliar with the equipment. Placed before a $4,000 Neumann microphone, he recalled thinking, "Bro, I don't know how to use this", and added: "I pulled out my phone and I was in the booth, in front of the mic, using BandLab!" Collaborating gradually made him more comfortable; he told Dork that studio engineers felt like "a coach in the room" who held him to higher standards than he set on BandLab. Alongside producers Dan Darmawan, Spencer Stewart, Stint, and Robin Hannibal, Burke brought in friends from his gaming circle: Fortnite friend Matt Bartkus produced the instrumental for "Backstreet Girl", and fellow gamer Evan Wise co-produced "Don't Forget About Me". Burke had also messaged the Icelandic-Chinese jazz singer Laufey on social media to tell her, "Your music sounds like a warm hug." Three months later, she replied after hearing his music on TikTok, and Stewart brought them together to record their duet "This Is How It Feels" with Laufey on piano in the sole studio session used on the EP.

== Composition ==
=== Music ===
Laufey (pictured in 2023) is the only featured artist on Petals to Thorns, playing piano and singing on "This Is How It Feels".

Running 28 minutes and 48 seconds across nine tracks on its standard edition, Petals to Thorns spans indie pop, alternative R&B, bedroom pop, and indie rock. AllMusic's Matt Collar heard a "kohl-eyed amalgam of Stevie Wonder and the Cure's Robert Smith", while Damiano Pandolfini of OndaRock heard "elegant vintage gusts and a rock restlessness simmering just beneath the surface" across chamber pop, indie soul, dream pop, vocal jazz, and emo-pop. Mike Wass of Variety and Patricia Guerrero of Rolling Stone en Español also heard touches of post-punk, shoegaze, pop-punk, and hip-hop.

Because the project compiles songs from different points in his first year of recording, Burke left his raw iPhone vocal takes intact on several tracks. He told Sniffers: "My vocals aren't perfect, I'm out of key sometimes, my voice cracks a lot, there's no mix, you can hear the background noise and all." Aside from Paramore and Deftones, his main influences were gospel and jazz singers such as Chet Baker, Ella Fitzgerald, Sarah Vaughan, and Brenda Lee. Burke approached his delivery somewhere between singing and spoken word and studied how 1960s and 1970s vocalists pronounced their words; as he told GQ, "at this stage, I just wanna speak on the mic". Discovering Japanese rock through anime also led him to experiment with vocal stacks and melodies, because "when you sing in a different language the melodies are insane because of the different syllables".

=== Concept and lyrics ===
Burke called Petals to Thorns "a jump into the depth of my mind because this project is the verbalization of every part of me". He told Zane Lowe on Apple Music 1 that he released an EP before attempting a full-length album to test the waters and give narrative framing to his 2022 singles. Putting older releases together with newer songs felt like "buying a puzzle from a store and laying the pieces on the floor and trying to figure it out without looking at the box", he said to GBH News. Inspired by the contrast between "Here with Me" and "Romantic Homicide", he placed the love songs first and the breakup songs second to trace a story of rising action, climax, falling action, and resolution. He told Variety the tracklist follows "getting to know the person, the talking stage, intimacy, and then the point when you lose them". To Burke, a white rose is what remains once romance is stripped from a red rose. Comparing the EP to picking one up by its petals, he told GQ, "I'm looking at those beautiful petals, but I'm going to pick it up and get stabbed", hoping listeners reach the midpoint "looking at your hand and wondering how such a beautiful thing could hurt you".

Because Burke was homeschooled and had never gone through a breakup himself, he wrote Petals to Thorns in a mix of first- and third-person perspectives. He had written free-verse poetry since the fifth grade after reading poets Nikita Gill and Martina McGowan and manga such as Attack on Titan. He sat alone in cafes and movie theaters to take notes on strangers' habits in a journal, read books on nihilism, and took ideas from movies such as Donnie Darko (2001), 500 Days of Summer (2009), Up (2009), and Interstellar (2014). Many of the songs bring up dreams, placebos, and illusions to convey what Burke called his central theme: "nothing is really real, and it's all in my head from the start". In the music videos and live shows, those illusions are caused by It4mi, whose name comes from the Japanese word itami ('pain'). It4mi wears a blindfold and a blood-stained shirt and is one of four personas symbolized by the "4" in D4vd's stage name, alongside his artist, ski-mask gamer, and bonnet-wearing TikTok alter egos. Burke got the idea for It4mi while watching Tokyo Ghoul and Jujutsu Kaisen; in his lore, the character is a noir detective with a split personality who solves crimes he committed himself. He called It4mi "the antagonist" who "wants to inflict pain on me" and hides behind a blindfold while making up romantic scenarios in the artist persona's mind so he thinks "love is not real".

=== Songs ===
"Sleep Well" opens the EP with a quiet guitar arpeggio, shimmering string-synth lines, trumpet by Josh Shpak, and saxophone by Amber Navran. Collar heard echoes of Boyz II Men and early Michael Jackson, Wass put the jazz-folk and R&B lullaby "somewhere between Bruno Mars and Lord Huron", and V's Nicholson Baird praised Burke's falsetto on the line "Who's to say that our love ain't real?" Burke wrote and recorded "Sleep Well" the same night as "Worthless" so the EP would begin gently with vocals that could "flow like water". He said he was first "speaking to myself and promising to be there for myself" before imagining how to comfort a future partner. "Here with Me", the second track, is an indie-pop slow jam written and produced with Darmawan that pairs distorted singing with experimental vocal runs. Collar compared it to "Ween covering a Lionel Richie slow jam from the '80s", and Pandolfini called it a "tearjerking carousel ride through an abandoned amusement park". Burke modeled both the song and its video on the montage of Carl and Ellie growing old together in Pixar's Up. The third track, "This Is How It Feels", is a duet with Laufey produced by Stewart with additional production by Noah Ehler. Set to baroque vocal harmonies, a waltz-like string quartet, and piano by Laufey, it gave Burke the classical-jazz piece he "would've never thought of doing ... on my phone". Despite its romantic chorus ("This is how it feels to fall in love"), he wrote his verses about antisocial middle-school classmates who ate lunch alone and paid no attention to others' opinions.

"Don't Forget About Me", the fourth track, is an alternative R&B and chamber pop ballad co-written with Hannibal and Egan Leister and produced by Nextime, Wise, and Hannibal. Pandolfini compared its arrangement to the work of Rhye, and Burke pleads with an ex-lover to preserve their shared memories ("Tell me I'd be better off dead / But don't tell me you forgot about me"). "Worthless" is an uptempo alt-rock and emo-pop song co-written and co-produced with Stewart, Casey Smith, and Sofía Valdés. Over a driving beat, Burke sings in his upper register about self-doubt and feeling lost ("It's easier said than done / I'm trying to find my purpose"). Next comes "Backstreet Girl", a moody new wave and dream-pop ballad that Pandolfini compared to Beach House. Produced by Bartkus and mixed by Burke, it weaves in "bits and pieces" of "Here with Me" and "Romantic Homicide" as fan service.

"Romantic Homicide"
A 13-second sample of "Romantic Homicide", showing the unmastered iPhone vocals Burke recorded on BandLab in his sister's closet over Dan Darmawan's grungy guitar instrumental.

"You and I", the seventh track, is a jangly 1990s-style indie rock and anthemic post-punk song produced by grayskies. Burke said he got into his "Hans Zimmer bag" when he wrote it to score his Fortnite montages. "Romantic Homicide", the penultimate song, is a grungy, downtempo fuzz-rock and emo ballad produced by Darmawan and inspired by manga. It uses sparse vocals with two layers of background harmonies over dusty guitars that Pandolfini compared to Placebo frontman Brian Molko. Its lyrics trace "the death of love" and resentment toward an unfaithful ex ("In the back of my mind / I killed you"), metaphorically killing the memory of the relationship to find closure. The closer, "The Bridge" (produced by Chris Marek and Michael Harrison), builds through repetition and a steady crescendo. Collar compared the indie rock and pop-punk track to Paramore, Guerrero likened it to early-2000s pop-punk, and Burke and Lowe compared it to Deftones. Burke called "The Bridge" the narrator's "stepping away point", where he realizes love has made him delusional and leaves the story on a cliffhanger. Although "Placebo Effect" had been released during the early rollout and appeared in advance tracklists, Burke left it off the standard edition as a play on its title, saying listeners' expectation of the missing track mirrored a relationship that never existed.

== Release and promotion ==
=== Singles and release ===
Burke released three tracks from the EP independently through DistroKid in 2022 before signing with Darkroom and Interscope in August. "You and I" came out on January 8, while "Here with Me" and "Romantic Homicide" arrived on July 17 and July 20. On TikTok, he kept his face off camera at first; "my videos were just BandLab screen recordings", he recalled to Variety. "Romantic Homicide" entered the US Billboard Hot 100 at number 77 before peaking at number 33, and it reached the top 10 on Billboard's Hot Alternative Songs, Hot Rock Songs, and Hot Rock & Alternative Songs charts. In September 2022, Tommy Killjoy directed a film noir video inspired by 1980s detective movies alongside Burke's parents' copies of The Twilight Zone and Perry Mason, and an animated video that month introduced It4mi. Arman Mitchell directed the December video for "Here with Me", which opens as an Up-inspired romance. "Because this song is so different from 'Romantic Homicide', I tried to figure out how to keep it in the same universe", Burke told VMAN. "So the video gradually gets darker." "Here with Me" entered the top 40 on the Billboard Hot 100 and appeared in over 1 million TikTok videos. Both singles passed 500 million Spotify streams before the EP came out.

Burke announced Petals to Thorns on April 3, 2023, and the EP was accompanied by three 2023 singles: "Worthless" on March 9, "Sleep Well" on April 13, and "Don't Forget About Me" on May 18. Its videos for "Worthless" and "Sleep Well" continued the It4mi storyline—showing the alter ego watching Burke at house parties and group therapy, and making his love interest vanish as if in a dream—and "Don't Forget About Me" received a live clip filmed in Sydney, Australia. The EP arrived on May 26, 2023, alongside a video for "The Bridge" in which Burke submerges himself in red-dyed water. Universal International issued a Japan-exclusive CD on July 12 in standard and limited editions—the latter packaged with a hand-signed card—with translated poems by Burke, Japanese lyric translations, and two bonus tracks ("Placebo Effect" and a live version of "Backstreet Girl"), and Darkroom and Interscope also released a "Translucent Black Ice" vinyl LP in 2023. The five-track companion EP The Lost Petals came out on September 8 after tour-bus noise kept Burke from recording new material on his phone and led him to compile unused tracks. "I'm a gamer, so I'm going to talk in video-game terms", he told Rolling Stone. "It's a DLC pack, it's downloadable content. It's an expansion of the first project and I wanted to finish off the story."

=== Touring and live performances ===
Burke had never been to a concert before he played his first show in Houston on February 17, 2023, to open his sold-out six-city Root of It All mini-tour. He saw another artist perform live for the first time at Madison Square Garden during SZA's SOS Tour, then played April dates in Sydney and Melbourne, telling 10 Magazine Australia that Australian fans "knew every song". Although rain washed out his April 30 slot at Pharrell Williams's Something in the Water festival in Virginia Beach, Virginia, he soon launched the headlining Petals to Thorns Tour wearing It4mi's blindfold and fake-blood-stained white shirt, which fans echoed in the crowd with matching shirts and white roses. Accompanied by his parents, he began the European leg at the Deaf Institute in Manchester, England, on May 28. In her review of his sold-out May 30 concert at London's Islington Assembly Hall for NME, Liberty Dunworth wrote that Burke handed out spare roses, bantered easily with the crowd, and brought out Darkroom labelmate Holly Humberstone for their unreleased duet "SuperBloodMoon".

He returned to Houston's White Oak Music Hall on June 25 to open the North American leg, where he streamed the show on Twitch, brought his younger sister onstage, and told the crowd, "Back then I was in the small room but now I'm in the big room!" In the Houston Press, DeVaughn Douglas remarked on how the crowd knew every word to the EP's album tracks as well as the singles, countering the stereotype that TikTok acts only hold fans for 15-second snippets. Between North American theater shows and two closing nights at Los Angeles's El Rey Theatre in August, he flew to Naeba in late July for Fuji Rock Festival, his first concert in Japan, where he played to more than 5,000 fans at the Red Marquee stage and did a backflip onstage. Later in 2023, Burke opened the second North American leg of SZA's SOS Tour and performed "Romantic Homicide" on Jimmy Kimmel Live! A six-city Asian leg of the Petals to Thorns Tour was also scheduled for November and December, but Burke postponed his Singapore show to November 2024 due to poor health.

== Critical reception ==
Professional ratings
Review scores
Source	Rating
AllMusic	4/5 stars
OndaRock	6.5/10

In his review for AllMusic, Collar wrote that Burke made good on his "emo-goth loverman persona" and showed far more depth than the "self-eviscerating balladry" of "Romantic Homicide". For Tower Records Japan's Bounce, Hiromi Todoroki praised the Japanese CD's hooks, laid-back alt-emo-pop style, and free-form beatmaking. In OndaRock, Pandolfini wrote that Burke's "rich, expressive voice" stood apart from dance, hip-hop, and reggaeton trends and seemed "built to age well" even without TikTok, though he found parts of the EP naive and saccharine. He also wrote that listeners who liked Tobias Jesso Jr., Charlotte Day Wilson, or MorMor might find the execution "formulaic and overly polished".

Spin's Al Shipley placed Petals to Thorns at number 25 on the magazine's list of the best EPs of 2023, writing that Burke's "brooding indie pop sound struck a chord on TikTok". Lauren Turner of Atwood Magazine included it among the 36 best EPs of 2023 for its "gorgeous and smooth vocals", poetic writing, genre variety, and the emotional pull of the seven tracks outside "Here with Me" and "Romantic Homicide". Profiling Burke for Rolling Stone Australia, Conor Lochrie wrote that shifting between slow jams, grunge, indie rock, and R&B showed he was "one of Gen Z's most formidable talents". Wass praised the "staggering versatility" of songs like "Sleep Well" in Variety, and GQ's Megan Armstrong wrote that Burke's writing was "still the star" across the EP's shifts in style.

== Commercial performance ==
Petals to Thorns debuted at number 105 on the US Billboard 200 for the week of June 10, 2023. Outside the United States, it peaked in 2023 at number 24 in Lithuania, number 27 in New Zealand, number 37 in Norway, and number 45 in Finland. The EP later earned gold certifications in Poland and New Zealand and platinum certification in Canada.

After police identified the remains of 14-year-old Celeste Rivas Hernandez in Burke's Tesla in September 2025, his catalog drew more streams on Spotify, YouTube, and Apple Music. According to Luminate data reported by Billboard, his US on-demand streams more than doubled from 13.8 million between September 12 and 16 to 30.3 million between September 18 and 22, and "Romantic Homicide" rose 224 percent from 2.9 million to 9.4 million. By September 22, "Romantic Homicide" reached number 8 and "Here with Me" reached number 39 on Spotify's daily US songs chart, and Burke reached a career-high number 42 on Spotify's daily artists chart. On October 4, 2025, Petals to Thorns re-entered the Billboard 200 at number 51 and peaked at number 7 on Top Alternative Albums, number 13 on Top Rock & Alternative Albums, and number 82 on the Billboard Canadian Albums chart.

== Aftermath and 2026 reissue ==
Los Angeles police opened an investigation into Hernandez's death after finding her body inside the front trunk of Burke's impounded 2023 Tesla on September 8, 2025. World champion figure skater Alysa Liu dropped "This Is How It Feels" from her 2025–26 Olympic-season short program on September 24—two weeks after winning the Lombardia Trophy with the routine—saying she was moving in a different direction "in light of recent news". Darkroom and Interscope dropped Burke late in 2025 once he became a suspect, and because Universal Music Group (UMG) did not own his recordings, release credits for Petals to Thorns moved to his own company, D4VD ENT. Following Burke's arrest on April 16, 2026, prosecutors charged him four days later with first-degree murder. He pleaded not guilty, and his attorneys said "the actual evidence in this case will show that David Burke did not murder Celeste Rivas Hernandez and he was not the cause of her death". Amid petitions by the advocacy group Industry Blackout urging Spotify and Apple Music to remove Burke's catalog, UMG assisted Laufey in taking down "This Is How It Feels" from digital services, and Petals to Thorns was reissued on streaming platforms as an eight-track, 24-minute edition.

== Track listing ==
Credits are adapted from the EP's Apple Music liner notes, AllMusic, the Japanese CD liner notes, and the vinyl LP liner notes.

Petals to Thorns standard edition track listing
No.	Title	Writer(s)	Producer(s)	Length
1.	"Sleep Well"	David Anthony Burke; Spencer Stewart; Ajay Bhattacharyya	Stewart; Stint	2:55
2.	"Here with Me"	Burke; Dan Darmawan	Darmawan	4:02
3.	"This Is How It Feels" (featuring Laufey (Note: Removed from digital music platforms in April 2026, replacing the standard edition with an eight-track, 24-minute reissue.))	Burke; Laufey Lín Jónsdóttir; Stewart; Leroy Clampitt	Stewart; Noah Ehler (add.)	4:44
4.	"Don't Forget About Me"	Burke; Robin Hannibal; Egan Leister	Nextime; Evan Wise; Hannibal	2:29
5.	"Worthless (Note: Stylized in all caps.)"	Burke; Stewart; Casey Smith; Sofía Valdés	Stewart; Smith; Valdés	2:43
6.	"Backstreet Girl"	Burke	Matt Bartkus	4:10
7.	"You and I"	Burke	grayskies	2:32
8.	"Romantic Homicide"	Burke; Darmawan	Darmawan	2:12
9.	"The Bridge"	Burke	Chris Marek; Michael Harrison	3:01
Total length:				28:48

Japanese CD edition bonus tracks
No.	Title	Writer(s)	Producer(s)	Length
10.	"Placebo Effect"	Burke; Darmawan	Darmawan
11.	"Backstreet Girl" (Live)	Burke	—

== Credits and personnel ==
Credits are adapted from the EP's 2023 and 2026 Apple Music liner notes, AllMusic, the Japanese CD liner notes, and Variety; track numbers correspond to the nine-track standard edition.

=== Musicians ===
- D4vd – vocals (all tracks)
- Laufey – vocals, piano (track 3)
- Spencer Stewart – guitar (track 1), programming (tracks 1, 5)
- Stint – programming (track 1)
- Josh Shpak – trumpet (track 1)
- Amber Navran – saxophone (track 1)

=== Technical ===
- D4vd – vocal recording engineer (track 1), engineer (track 5), mixing engineer (track 6)
- Spencer Stewart – producer (tracks 1, 3, 5), engineer (track 1)
- Stint – producer (track 1)
- Dan Darmawan – producer (tracks 2, 8)
- Noah Ehler – additional producer (track 3)
- Nextime – producer (track 4)
- Evan Wise – producer (track 4)
- Robin Hannibal – producer (track 4)
- Casey Smith – producer (track 5)
- Sofía Valdés – producer (track 5)
- Matt Bartkus – producer (track 6)
- grayskies – producer (track 7)
- Chris Marek – producer (track 9)
- Michael Harrison – producer (track 9)
- Jeff Ellis – mixing engineer (tracks 1, 3, 4), immersive mixing engineer (tracks 3, 4)
- Prash "Engine-Earz" Mistry – mastering engineer (tracks 1, 3–5, 9), mixing engineer (tracks 5, 9), immersive mixing engineer (tracks 2, 5–7, 9)
- Lavar Bullard – immersive mixing engineer (tracks 2, 5)
- Ivan Handwerk – assistant mixing engineer (tracks 3, 4)
- Trevor Taylor – assistant mixing engineer (tracks 3, 4)

== Charts ==
Chart performance for Petals to Thorns
Chart (2023–2025)	Peak position
Canadian Albums (Billboard)	82
Finnish Albums (Suomen virallinen lista)	45
Lithuanian Albums (AGATA)	24
New Zealand Albums (RMNZ)	27
Norwegian Albums (VG-lista)	37
US Billboard 200	51
US Top Alternative Albums (Billboard)	7
US Top Rock & Alternative Albums (Billboard)	13

== Certifications ==
Certifications for Petals to Thorns
Region	Certification	Certified units/sales
Canada (Music Canada)	Platinum	80,000^{‡}
New Zealand (RMNZ)	Gold	7,500^{‡}
Poland (ZPAV)	Gold	10,000^{‡}
^{‡} Sales+streaming figures based on certification alone.

== Release history ==
Release dates and formats for Petals to Thorns
Region	Date	Format(s)	Edition	Label	Refs.
Various	May 26, 2023	Digital download; Streaming	Standard	Darkroom; Interscope	
Japan	July 12, 2023	CD	Japanese bonus tracks	Universal International	
Various	2023	LP	Translucent Black Ice vinyl	Darkroom; Interscope	
Various	April 2026	Digital download; Streaming	8-track reissue	D4VD ENT	
