= Messy Love =

Messy Love may refer to:

- "Messy Love", a song by Mura Masa from the 2017 album Mura Masa
- "Messy Love", a song by Nao from the 2021 album And Then Life Was Beautiful
