= Saturn (album) =

Studio album by Nao
- Released: 26 October 2018
- Genre: R&B; jazz
- Length: 46:55
- Label: RCA; Little Tokyo; Sony
- Producer: Grades; Stint; Loxe; Dan Cox; Mura Masa; Royce Wood Junior; King Henry; Joel Little

Nao chronology
For All We Know (2016)	Saturn (2018)	And Then Life Was Beautiful (2021)

Saturn is the second studio album by British R&B recording artist Nao, released on 26 October 2018 through Little Tokyo Recordings and RCA Records. It was supported by the singles "Another Lifetime" and "Make It Out Alive". "If You Ever" was also released prior to the album in a version featuring American singer 6lack, but he does not feature on the album version. Nao will tour in support of the album across late 2018 and early 2019. Saturn received nominations for Album of the Year at the Mercury Prize in 2019 and Best Urban Contemporary Album at the 62nd Grammy Awards in 2020.

== Background ==
Nao named the album after being told by her friends about the astrological concept of Saturn return, when the planet Saturn returns to the same place in the sky that it was when a person was born. This typically takes 29 years, but the reported "influence" can begin at the age of 27. Nao said: "It's like waking up and coming of age, like: 'I've been going through my twenties and what have I been doing in this relationship?' What have I been doing in this job?' You start to rethink everything – old stuff that your parents taught you or ideas that you believed in. It's like a complete shedding of skin and it can be painful."

== Critical reception ==
Professional ratings
Aggregate scores
Source	Rating
Metacritic	83/100
Review scores
Source	Rating
The Guardian	4/5 stars
NME	4/5 stars
The Line of Best Fit	9/10

On review aggregator Metacritic, Saturn has received a score of 83 out of 100 based on reviews from 14 critics, indicating "universal acclaim". Kyann-Sian Williams of NME rated the album four out of five stars and said that Nao's "honest, cinematic exploration of love, lust, and hardship makes for a compelling adventure – and one you'll happily join [her] on". Williams concluded the review by saying that "Saturn is full of beautiful, intricately unique songs that could never be imitated. Like her, it's simply one of a kind." Writing for The Guardian, Natty Kasambala said that on the album, "although [Nao's] sugary vocals have remained intact, her artistic and personal growth is evident". Kasambala further judged that "It's hard to distinguish any obvious commercial hits. Saturn falls somewhere between the dance hits of producer DJs with big-name features, and earnest, heart-tugging balladry." Kasambala acknowledged that along with the "rise of R&B classicists" like Jorja Smith, Ella Mai and Mahalia, "Nao presents a compelling alternative to the mainstream". Writing for The Line of Best Fit, Katie Pilbeam awarded the album a score of 9 out of 10, describing Saturn as "a cathartic rebirth" and praising it as "a powerful documentation of letting relationships, jobs and regrets go," concluding that the album radiates "a sense of healing and growth".

== Track listing ==
No.	Title	Writer(s)	Producer(s)	Length
1.	"Another Lifetime"	Neo Jessica Joshua; Daniel Traynor; Ajay Bhattacharya	Nao; Grades; Stint	3:29
2.	"Make It Out Alive" (featuring SiR)	Joshua; Traynor; Clarence Coffee Jr.; Sir Darryl Farris	Nao; Grades	3:59
3.	"If You Ever"	Joshua; Alexander Crossan; Coffee Jr.	Nao; Mura Masa; Grades^{[c]}	3:39
4.	"When Saturn Returns (Interlude)"	George Moore	Nao; Grades; Dan Cox^{[c]}	0:59
5.	"Saturn" (featuring Kwabs)	Joshua; Traynor; Rowan Perkins; Ashton Simmonds	Nao; Grades; Loxe	4:50
6.	"Gabriel"	Joshua; Traynor; Joseph Price; James Luke Wood	Nao; Grades; Royce Wood Junior	3:50
7.	"Orbit"	Joshua; Traynor; James Ryan Ho	Nao; Grades; Cox^{[c]}	3:53
8.	"Love Supreme"	Joshua; Traynor; Wood; Perkins	Nao; Grades; Loxe	4:15
9.	"Curiosity"	Joshua; Traynor; Alexandra Yatchenko Richard Muhammad; Henry Allen; Yvette Riby-Williams	Nao; Grades; Loxe; King Henry^{[c]}	3:35
10.	"Drive and Disconnect"	Joshua; Traynor; Bhattacharya; Jeff Gitelman; Sarah Aarons	Nao; Grades; Stint	3:30
11.	"Don't Change"	Joshua; Traynor; Bhattacharya	Nao; Grades; Stint	3:28
12.	"Yellow of the Sun"	Joshua; Traynor; Joel Little	Nao; Little; Grades	3:51
13.	"A Life Like This"	Joshua; Perkins; Francis White	Nao; Loxe	3:37
Total length:				46:55

Japanese edition bonus tracks
No.	Title	Writer(s)	Producer(s)	Length
14.	"Bad Blood"	Joshua; Traynor	Nao; Grades	4:00
15.	"Adore You" (featuring Abhi//Dijon)	Joshua; Abhi Raju; Dijon Duenas; Leonardo Vianna Bozza	Nao; LOXE; Grades^{[a]}	3:31
16.	"Girlfriend"	Joshua; Bhattacharyya	Nao; Grades; Stint	3:47
Total length:				58:29

Notes

- ^{^[a]} signifies an additional producer

== Charts ==
Chart (2018)	Peak position
UK Albums (OCC)	56
UK R&B Albums (OCC)	2
US Heatseekers Albums (Billboard)	20
US R&B/Hip-Hop Album Sales (Billboard)	31
