= Notes from a Wrist =

Single by D4vd

from the EP The Lost Petals
- Released: August 18, 2023
- Length: 3:09
- Label: Darkroom; Interscope
- Songwriter: David Burke
- Producer: Melone

D4vd singles chronology
"Placebo Effect" (2023)	"Notes from a Wrist" (2023)	"Call Me Revenge" (2023)

"Notes from a Wrist" is a single by American singer–songwriter D4vd, released on August 18, 2023. The song is included on D4vd's second extended play (EP), The Lost Petals.

== Background ==
"Notes from a Wrist" is about D4vd's childhood friend who struggled with depression. The song describes "the pain experienced in an unstable home."

In an interview, D4vd described "Notes from a Wrist" as a turning point in his songwriting, where he shifted to telling stories from others' perspectives.

The lyrics describe themes of emotional pain, self-harm imagery, and feelings of isolation, with the narrator questioning his fears and emotional responses despite achieving his desires.

== Music video ==
The music video for "Notes from a Wrist" was premiered the day before the song was released, being directed by Erik Rojas. The music video depicts D4vd reflecting on challenging moments in his life while contemplating a lost love.

In an interview, D4vd explained that the video is a symbolic of "the walk of life," showing how people can be deeply focused on themselves while missing what's happening around them. D4vd described scenes in the video where characters look at themselves as representing self-reflection, almost like "talking to yourself about yourself."
