= It's About Time (Chic album) =

Studio album by Nile Rodgers & Chic
- Released: September 28, 2018
- Recorded: 2014–2018
- Studio: Abbey Road, London
- Genre: R&B, disco
- Length: 38:58
- Label: Virgin EMI
- Producer: Nile Rodgers; Russell Graham; Danny L Harle; Mura Masa; Om'Mas Keith; Jeff Gitelman; Nao; Thomas Troelsen; Jerry Barnes; Philippe Saisse; Rene Arsenault; Riot City; Teddy Riley

Nile Rodgers & Chic chronology
A Night in Amsterdam (2006)	It's About Time (2018)

Singles from It's About Time
- 1. "Till the World Falls" Released: June 22, 2018; 2. "Sober" Released: September 7, 2018

It's About Time is the ninth studio album by the American band Chic released on September 28, 2018 through Virgin EMI Records. It was written and conducted by Chic guitarist Nile Rodgers. It’s About Time is the first album to be released in over two decades for the group, and is the first Chic album to not feature founding member Bernard Edwards who died in 1996. Originally scheduled for a 2015 release, heralded by the single "I'll Be There", the album concept kept changing and the release delayed for three years, partly due to the deaths of Prince and David Bowie. Eventually released on Virgin EMI Records in September 2018, the album cover is a homage to the group’s 1977 self titled debut album Chic. The lead single, "Till the World Falls", featuring Mura Masa, Cosha and Vic Mensa, was released on June 22, 2018.

According to Rodgers, It's About Time is the first of two albums that make up the "new Chic experience". The second album Executive Realness was originally scheduled for February 2019, and will "bring to a close the journey of Chic". It was later postponed to May 2019, but ultimately never materialized. As of 2026, nothing is confirmed for the tenth and final album. One of the songs, "I Believe in Music", was broadcast on the BBC, but remains unreleased.

== Critical reception ==
Professional ratings
Aggregate scores
Source	Rating
Metacritic	64/100
Review scores
Source	Rating
Consequence of Sound	B−
Financial Times	3/5 stars
The Guardian	3/5 stars
The Independent	2/5 stars
MusicOMH	3/5 stars
NME	3/5 stars
The Observer	4/5 stars
The Times	3/5 stars

It's About Time received generally positive reviews from music critics. At Metacritic, which assigns a normalized rating out of 100 to reviews from mainstream critics, the album has an average score of 64 based on seven reviews, indicating "generally favorable reviews".

The album earned Chic a nomination for the Brit Award for International Group at the 2019 Brit Awards.

== Track listing ==
It's About Time track listing
No.	Title	Writer(s)	Producer(s)	Length
1.	"Till the World Falls" (featuring Mura Masa, Cosha and Vic Mensa)	Nile Rodgers; Brandon Anderson; Anaïs Aida; Neo Jessica Joshua; Alexander Crossan; Victor Mensah	Rodgers; Russell Graham; Mura Masa; Om'Mas Keith; Jeff Gitelman^{[a]}	5:17
2.	"Boogie All Night" (featuring Nao)	Rodgers; Joshua; Daniel Eisner Harle	Rodgers; Graham; Nao; Danny L Harle	3:30
3.	"Sober" (featuring Craig David and Stefflon Don)	Rodgers; Charles Harrison; Lonnell Corbett	Rodgers; Graham	3:08
4.	"Do You Wanna Party" (featuring LunchMoney Lewis)	Rodgers; Thomas Troelsen; Harle; Gamal Lewis	Rodgers; Graham; Thomas Troelsen; Harle	3:21
5.	"Dance with Me" (featuring Hailee Steinfeld)	Rodgers; Curtis Williams; Sha Sha Jones	Rodgers; Graham	3:30
6.	"I Dance My Dance"	Rodgers; Alexandra Forbes; Jerry Barnes; Melissa Sanley	Rodgers; Graham; Barnes	3:27
7.	"State of Mine (It's About Time)" (featuring Philippe Saisse)	Rodgers; Philippe Saisse	Rodgers; Graham; Saisse	4:42
8.	"Queen" (featuring Sir Elton John and Emeli Sandé)	Rodgers	Rodgers; Graham	3:55
9.	"I Want Your Love" (featuring Lady Gaga)	Rodgers; Bernard Edwards	Rodgers; Graham; Rene Arsenault; Riot City	4:56
10.	"'New Jack' Sober" (Teddy Riley version (featuring Craig David and Stefflon Don))	Rodgers; Harrison; Corbett; Edward Riley; Jonathan Kerr; Thomas Robertson	Rodgers; Graham; Teddy Riley	3:12
Total length:				38:58

Japanese edition bonus tracks
No.	Title	Length
11.	"Message from Nile Rodgers"	4:22
Total length:		43:27

Notes

- ^{^[a]} signifies an additional producer.

== Charts ==
Chart performance for It's About Time
Chart (2018)	Peak position
Belgian Albums (Ultratop Flanders)	25
Belgian Albums (Ultratop Wallonia)	41
Dutch Albums (Album Top 100)	66
German Albums (Offizielle Top 100)	72
Irish Albums (IRMA)	72
Japan Hot Albums (Billboard Japan)	67
Japanese Albums (Oricon)	49
Scottish Albums (Official Charts)	16
Spanish Albums (PROMUSICAE)	74
Swiss Albums (Schweizer Hitparade)	28
UK Albums (Official Charts)	10
