= The Lost Petals =

2023 EP by D4vd

EP by d4vd
- Released: September 8, 2023
- Length: 16:15
- Labels: Darkroom; Interscope
- Producers: Grayskies; Nicho; Nelson Moneo; Melone

D4vd chronology
Petals to Thorns (2023)	The Lost Petals (2023)	Withering (2024)

Singles from The Lost Petals
- 1. "Notes From A Wrist" Released: August 18, 2023

The Lost Petals is the second extended play by American singer-songwriter D4vd, released on September 8, 2023, through Darkroom and Interscope Records. Produced by Nicho with contributions from various producers, including Nelson Moneo, the EP features singles "Poetic Vulgarity" and "Notes from a Wrist".

== Background and recording ==
In 2022, D4vd released his debut single, "Romantic Homicide", which gained popularity on TikTok and helped him secure a record deal with Interscope Records. He created new music in his sister's closet after the release of Petals to Thorns, which eventually became The Lost Petals.

== Promotion ==
The album was announced with the release of "Notes from a Wrist" and D4vd performed it at the White Oak Music Hall.

== Track listing ==
No.	Title	Length
1.	"Notes from a Wrist"	3:09
2.	"Hollow Prayers"	2:46
3.	"Rehab"	4:11
4.	"Poetic Vulgarity"	4:00
5.	"Once More"	2:01
Total length:		16:15

== Personnel ==
- David Burke – engineering, mastering, mixing, production, vocalist, composition, lyricist
- Jeff Ellis – mixer, engineer (all tracks, except "Once More")
- Grayskies – producer (3)
- Dale Becker – mastering, engineering (all tracks)
- Fili Filizzola – mastering, engineering (2, 3)
- Nicho – producer (5)
