= Call Me Revenge =

Single by 21 Savage & D4vd
- Released: October 17, 2023
- Genre: Hip-hop
- Length: 2:48
- Label: Epic Records
- Songwriters: Shéyaa Abraham-Joseph; Ryan Tedder; Jason Evigan; Sam Harris; Sean Foreman
- Producers: Ryan Tedder; Jason Evigan

21 Savage singles chronology
"Good Good" (2023)	"Call Me Revenge" (2023)	"Redrum" (2024)

d4vd singles chronology
"Notes from a Wrist" (2023)	"Call Me Revenge" (2023)	"Romantic Homicide - Live Version" (2023)

"Call Me Revenge" is a single by British rapper 21 Savage and American singer-songwriter D4vd. It was released on October 17, 2023, through Epic Records, and was made for Call of Duty: Modern Warfare III.

== Background ==
"Call Me Revenge" was created for the video game Call of Duty: Modern Warfare III. The song serves as a promotional lead-in to the game. In an interview with UPROXX, d4vd hinted at working in the gaming space, mentioning both Fortnite and Call of Duty: Modern Warfare III.

The song focuses on themes of revenge and loyalty, with d4vd singing the chorus and 21 Savage delivering the rap verses about keeping enemies close and asserting his presence.

After D4vd's arrest on April 26th 2026, the song was pulled from all streaming services with all references removed from social media.

== Critical reception ==
Alexander Cole of HotNewHipHop wrote about the song as a "pop culture crossover" that is characterized by the shiny vocals of d4vd and the production work of Ryan Tedder, but he stated that it "does sound great", especially the verse of 21 Savage. UPROXX noted that D4vd's smooth, melodic vocals complement 21 Savage's confident, loyalty-focused verses centered on themes of revenge and resilience.

== Personnel ==
- Shéyaa Abraham-Joseph – vocals, songwriter
- David Burke – vocals
- Ryan Tedder – songwriter, producer
- Jason Evigan – songwriter, producer
- Sam Harris – songwriter
- Sean Foreman – songwriter
