= Nao (singer) =

English singer-songwriter (born 1987)

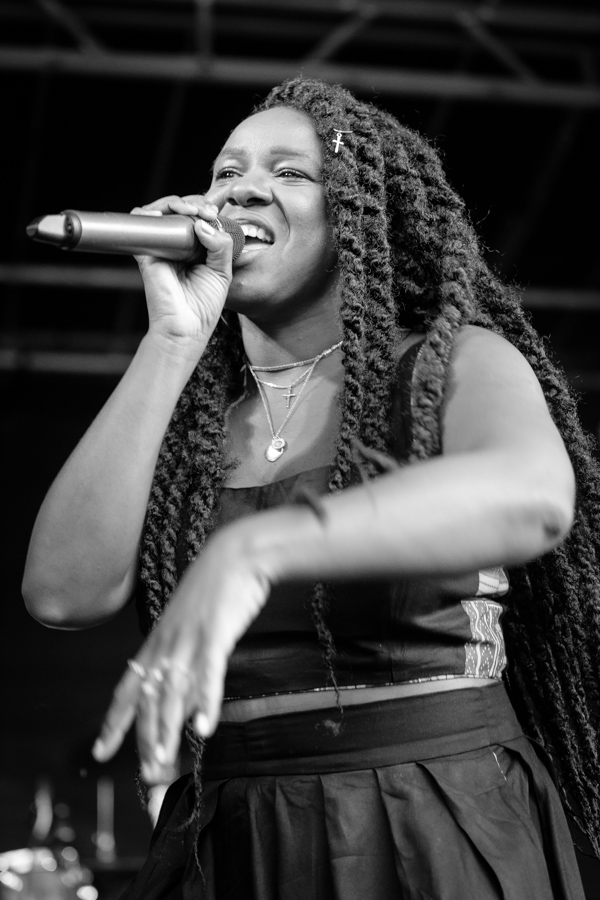
- Nao in 2018

Background information
- Born: Neo Jessica Joshua; 20 December 1987 (age 38); Nottingham, England
- Genres: Soul; R&B; avant-R&B; avant-soul; electronic; funk
- Occupations: Singer; songwriter; record producer
- Instruments: Vocals; keyboards
- Years active: 2014–present
- Labels: Little Tokyo Recordings; RCA
- Website: www.thisnao.com

Neo Jessica Joshua (born 20 December 1987), better known as Nao (/ˈneɪoʊ/), is an English singer-songwriter and record producer from East London. Her sound has been described as soul combined with electronic music, funk and R&B, while Nao herself coined the term "wonky funk" to describe her style. She released her debut album, For All We Know, in 2016, her second album, Saturn, in 2018, and her third, And Then Life Was Beautiful, in 2021. Her most recent album, Jupiter, was released in 2025.

== Background and early life ==
Nao is the youngest of five children in her mother's house, but is the only child of her mother and father, who raised her “as friends” between London and Nottingham, where he lives. Her single “Another Lifetime” was dedicated to her mother. She is of Jamaican, Vincentian and Grenadinian descent.

She studied vocal jazz at the Guildhall School of Music & Drama in London and went on to be a backing singer for artists such as Kwabs and Jarvis Cocker. In 2008, she joined to sing in an all-girl a cappella group called The Boxettes. The group, alongside Nao, made an appearance with other acapella groups in a flash mob performance for the 2010 T-Mobile advert "Welcome Home", which was shot in London's Heathrow Terminal 5. In 2014, she eventually left the group to pursue a career as a recording artist.

== Career ==
In October 2014, she released her first EP, So Good, it reached number 4 on the iTunes electronic chart and the title track made the BBC Radio 1 and BBC 1Xtra national playlists in the United Kingdom. This was followed by a second EP, 15 February (II MMXV), in May 2015, receiving the "Best New Music" tag from Pitchfork. Nao made her hit “Another Lifetime” for her mother. In September 2015 Nao was named as a nominee for best newcomer at the 2015 MOBO Awards. Nao was a featured vocalist and writer on Disclosure's UK number 1 album, Caracal, on the track "Superego". She was featured in the long list for the BBC Sound of... 2016 prize in November 2015, ultimately being named in third place in January 2016. Nao also featured as a co-writer on the track "Velvet / Jenny Francis (Interlude)" on Stormzy's debut album Gang Signs & Prayer.

Her debut album, For All We Know, was released on 29 July 2016, leading to a Brit Award Nomination for Best British Female Solo Artist.

In 2017, she released a buzz single, entitled "Nostalgia", as she tells fans that she was back in the studio recording material for her second album. During that time, she also appeared as a co-writer in Mura Masa's self-titled debut album on the song "Nothing Else!", featuring Jamie Lidell.

In mid-2018, she revealed that her next single was to be called "Another Lifetime" and co-written and produced by debut album affiliates Grades and Stint. It was eventually released in June 2018. She also performed live with Chic and Mura Masa on the song "Boogie All Night", which is included on Chic's 2018 comeback album It's About Time; she is a featured artist on the song alongside Mura Masa. She released her second album Saturn on 26 October 2018. Saturn respectively received nominations for Album of the Year at the Mercury Prize in 2019 and Best Urban Contemporary Album at the 62nd Grammy Awards in 2020.

On 29 July 2021, Nao revealed details of her third album, And Then Life Was Beautiful, which was released on September 24, 2021.

== Personal life ==
On 15 January 2020, Nao announced via Instagram that she was expecting her first child. She gave birth to a girl on 11 June 2020. In 2021, Nao announced that she would not be touring for her third album because of her diagnosis of chronic fatigue syndrome.

== Discography ==
=== Studio albums ===
Title	Details	Peak chart positions							
Title	Details	UK	UK R&B	BEL (FL)	NLD	SWI	US Dance	US Heat.	US R&B
For All We Know	Released: 29 July 2016; Label: RCA, Little Tokyo; Formats: Digital download, LP, CD	17	5	53	76	68	3	9	8
Saturn	Released: 26 October 2018; Label: RCA, Little Tokyo; Formats: Digital download, LP, CD	56	2	—	—	—	—	20	—
And Then Life Was Beautiful	Released: 24 September 2021; Label: RCA, Little Tokyo; Formats: Digital download, LP, CD	63	1	—	—	—	—	—	—
Jupiter	Released: 21 February 2025; Label: RCA, Little Tokyo; Formats: Digital download, LP, CD	—	—	—	—	—	—	—	—
Autumn	Released: 16 October 2026; Label: RCA, Little Tokyo; Formats: Digital download, LP, CD	—	—	—	—	—	—	—	—
"—" denotes items which were not released in that country or failed to chart.

=== Extended plays ===
Title	Details
So Good	Released: 27 October 2014; Label: Little Tokyo; Format: Digital download
15 February	Released: 1 May 2015; Label: Little Tokyo; Format: Digital download
For All We Know – The Remixes	Released: 12 February 2017; Label: Little Tokyo; Format: Digital download

=== Singles ===
Title	Year	Peak chart positions		Album
Title	Year	BEL (FL) Tip	US Adult R&B	Album
"So Good"	2014	—	—	So Good
"Zillionaire"	2014	—	—	15 February
"Bad Blood"	2015	57	—	For All We Know
"Fool to Love"	2016	—	—	For All We Know
"Girlfriend"	2016	—	—	For All We Know
"In the Morning"	2017	—	—	For All We Know
"Nostalgia"	2017	—	—	Non-album single
"Another Lifetime"	2018	—	—	Saturn
"Complicated" (with Mura Masa)	2018	23	—	Non-album single
"Make It Out Alive" (featuring SiR)	2018	—	25	Saturn
"If You Ever" (featuring 6lack)	2018	—	—	Saturn
"Orbit"	2019	—	—	Saturn
"Woman" (featuring Lianne La Havas)	2020	—	—	And Then Life Was Beautiful
"Antidote" (featuring Adekunle Gold)	2021	—	—	And Then Life Was Beautiful
"Messy Love"	2021	—	—	And Then Life Was Beautiful
"And Then Life Was Beautiful"	2021	—	—	And Then Life Was Beautiful
"Wait"	2021	—	—	And Then Life Was Beautiful
"Balance" (featuring Skillibeng)	2023	—	—	Non-album single
"Wildflowers"	2024	—	—	Jupiter
"Elevate"	2024	—	—	Jupiter
"All of Me"	2024	—	—	Jupiter
"Happy People"	2025	—	—	Jupiter
"Light Years"	2025	—	—	Jupiter
"Eugene"	2026	—	—	Autumn
"Save the World"	2026	—	—	Autumn
"—" denotes items which were not released in that country or failed to chart.

==== Promotional singles ====
Title	Year	Album
"Drive and Disconnect"	2018	Saturn
"Curiosity"	2018	Saturn

==== As featured artist ====
Title	Year	Album
"Firefly" (Mura Masa featuring Nao)	2015	Mura Masa
"Heart Storm" (Serpentwithfeet featuring Nao)	2021	Deacon

=== Guest appearances ===
Title	Year	Artist(s)	Album	Notes
"Make You Mine"	2015	Kwabs	Love + War	Background vocalist with Cass Lowe
"Superego"	2015	Disclosure	Caracal	Featured vocalist
"Brake Lights"	2018	Cosha	R.I.P. Bonzai	Featured vocalist
"Boogie All Night"	2018	Nile Rodgers & Chic	It's About Time	Featured vocalist

=== Songwriting credits ===
Title	Year	Artist(s)	Album	Credits
"Be Alright"	2016	Ariana Grande	Dangerous Woman	Co-writer
"Velvet / Jenny Francis (Interlude)"	2017	Stormzy	Gang Signs & Prayer	Co-writer
"Nothing Else!" (featuring Jamie Lidell)	2017	Mura Masa	Mura Masa	Co-writer
"Till the World Falls"(featuring Mura Masa, Cosha & Vic Mensa)	2018	Nile Rodgers & Chic	It's About Time	Co-writer
"Where Are You Now"	2021	Danny L Harle	Harlecore	Co-writer
"Boomerang"	2023	Jamila Woods	Water Made Us	Co-writer

== Awards and nominations ==
Year	Organisation	Award	Nominee/work	Result	Ref.
2016	BBC	Sound of 2016	Herself	Third	
2016	UK Music Video Awards	Best Urban Video - UK	"Bad Blood"	Won	
2016	UK Music Video Awards	Best Cinematography	"Bad Blood"	Nominated	
2017	Brit Awards	Best British Female Solo Artist	Herself	Nominated	
2018	UK Music Video Awards	Best Pop Video - UK	"Another Lifetime"	Nominated	
2019	Pop Awards	Album Of The Year Award	Saturn	Nominated	
2019	Mercury Prize	Album of the Year	Saturn	Nominated	
2020	Grammy Awards	Best Urban Contemporary Album	Saturn	Nominated	
