= Stint (record producer) =

Canadian record producer and songwriter

- Born: Ajay Bhattacharyya
- Origin: Victoria, British Columbia, Canada
- Genres: Pop; R&B; electronic; hip hop
- Occupations: Record producer; songwriter; remixer

Ajay Bhattacharyya, known professionally as Stint, is a Canadian record producer and songwriter. He has produced songs for Kesha, Gallant, MØ, Carly Rae Jepsen, Demi Lovato, NAO and Zara Larsson.

== Career ==
Stint was born and raised in Victoria, British Columbia. He attended Vancouver Film School, where he studied sound design. He is best known for his work with Gallant, producing and co-writing the majority of his debut album, Ology which was nominated for Best Urban Contemporary Album at the 2017 Grammy Awards. He has produced for NAO, HEALTH, Banks, Santigold, AlunaGeorge, Carly Rae Jepsen, among others. He has also released remixes of artists such as Q-Tip, Lana Del Rey, Kent Jones, and Young The Giant. His remix for West Coast peaked at number 1 on Hype Machine.

== Discography ==
=== Songwriting and production credits ===
| Title | Year | Artist(s) | Album | Credits | Written with | Produced with |
|---|---|---|---|---|---|---|
| "In Your Eyes" | 2013 | Banks | Non-album single | Producer | - | - |
| "Shadowless" | 2015 | Hannah Epperson | Shadowless EP | Co-writer/Producer | Hannah Epperson | - |
| "LA Hallucinations" | 2015 | Carly Rae Jepsen | E•MO•TION | Co-writer/Producer | Carly Rae Jepsen, Zachary Grey | Zachary Grey |
| "Weight in Gold" | 2015 | Gallant | Ology | Producer | - | - |
| "Skipping Stones" (featuring Jhene Aiko) | 2016 | Gallant | Ology | Producer | - | Adrian Younge |
| "Walking in a Circle" | 2016 | Santigold | 99¢ | Co-writer/Producer | Santi White, John Hill, Nicholas Zinner, Noah Beresin | John Hill, Noah Breakfast |
| "First" | 2016 | Gallant | Ology | Producer | - | - |
| "Talking to Myself" | 2016 | Gallant | Ology | Producer | - | - |
| "Shotgun" | 2016 | Gallant | Ology | Producer | - | - |
| "Bone + Tissue" | 2016 | Gallant | Ology | Producer | - | - |
| "Counting" | 2016 | Gallant | Ology | Producer | - | - |
| "Percogesic" | 2016 | Gallant | Ology | Producer | - | - |
| "Open Up" | 2016 | Gallant | Ology | Producer | - | - |
| "Last" | 2016 | Gallant | Ology | Producer | - | - |
| "If Only Chords" | 2016 | Morly | Something More Holy EP | Co-writer/Producer | Katey Morley | - |
| "Something More Holy" | 2016 | Morly | Something More Holy EP | Co-writer/Producer | Katey Morley | - |
| "Plucky" | 2016 | Morly | Something More Holy EP | Co-writer/Producer | Katey Morley | - |
| "By the Polo Pond" | 2016 | Morly | Something More Holy EP | Co-writer/Producer | Katey Morley | - |
| "Down N Out" | 2016 | Elias | Non-album single | Co-writer/Producer | Elias Sahlin, John Hill, Daniel Ledinsky | John Hill, Rob Cohen |
| "Makin' Me Happy" | 2016 | Elias | Non-album single | Co-writer/Producer | Elias Sahlin, John Hill, Daniel Ledinsky | John Hill, Rob Cohen |
| "Girlfriend" | 2016 | Nao | For All We Know | Co-writer/Producer | Neo Jessica Joshua | Nao, Grades |
| "Circles (Amelia)" | 2016 | Hannah Epperson | Unsweep | Co-writer/Producer | Hannah Epperson | - |
| "Jealous" | 2016 | AlunaGeorge | I Remember | Co-writer/Producer | Aluna Francis, George Reid, John Hill, Charlotte Aitchison, Jonnali Parmenius | John Hill, George Reid |
| "Wanderlust" | 2016 | AlunaGeorge | I Remember | Co-writer/Producer | Aluna Francis, George Reid, John Hill. Thomas Hull | John Hill, George Reid |
| "Farthest Distance (Amelia)" | 2016 | Hannah Epperson | Unsweep | Co-writer/Producer | Hannah Epperson | - |
| "Strong Thread (Amelia)" | 2016 | Hannah Epperson | Unsweep | Co-writer/Producer | Hannah Epperson | - |
| "Story (Amelia)" | 2016 | Hannah Epperson | Unsweep | Co-writer/Producer | Hannah Epperson | - |
| "Iodine (Amelia)" | 2016 | Hannah Epperson | Unsweep | Co-writer/Producer | Hannah Epperson | - |
| "Trying Not to Love You" | 2016 | Caroline Smith | Non-album single | Co-writer/Producer | Caroline Smith | - |
| "Symphony" (featuring Charlotte OC) | 2016 | Zeds Dead | Northern Lights | Co-writer | Dylan Mamid, Zachary Rapp-Rovan, Anjulie Persaud, Charlotte O'Connor | - |
| "Pink Cadillac" | 2017 | Maggie Chapman | Non-album single | Producer | - | John Hill |
| "Stay Lonely" | 2017 | Maggie Chapman | Non-album single | Producer | - | John Hill |
| "Silver Dollar" | 2017 | Train | A Girl, a Bottle, a Boat | Co-writer/Producer | Patrick Monahan, Jake Sinclair | - |
| "Make That Money Girl" | 2017 | Zara Larsson | So Good | Co-writer/Producer | Zara Larsson, Victor Mensah, Kaj Hassle, Daniel Ledinsky, John Hill, Markus Sepehrmanesh | John Hill |
| "Unravel Me" | 2017 | Sabrina Claudio | About Time | Co-writer/Producer | Sabrina Claudio | - |
| "Easy Tiger" | 2017 | Portugal. The Man | Woodstock | Co-writer/Producer | Jonathan Gourley, John Hill, Thomas Hull, Ammar Malik, Michael Hart | John Hill, Mike D, Mikey Hart |
| "Tidal Wave" | 2017 | Portugal. The Man | Woodstock | Co-writer/Producer | Jonathan Gourley, John Hill, Nicholas Koening, Ammar Malik | John Hill |
| "Belong to You" | 2017 | Sabrina Claudio | About Time | Co-writer/Producer | Sabrina Claudio | - |
| "Bleed Into the Water" | 2017 | R.LUM.R | After Image EP | Co-writer/Producer | Reginald Williams Jr. | R.LUM.R |
| "Learn" | 2017 | R.LUM.R | After Image EP | Co-writer/Producer | Reginald Williams Jr. | R.LUM.R |
| "Alone" | 2017 | Jessie Ware | Glasshouse | Producer | - | Kid Harpoon |
| "Tell Me You Love Me" | 2017 | Demi Lovato | Tell Me You Love Me | Co-writer/Producer | Kirby Dockery, John Hill | John Hill, Mitch Allan, Scott Robinson |
| "Natural" | 2017 | Sabrina Claudio | About Time | Producer | - | Blue Rondo |
| "Stand Still" | 2017 | Sabrina Claudio | About Time | Producer | - | - |
| "Wait" | 2017 | Sabrina Claudio | About Time | Producer | - | Mark Pellizzer, Alex Tanas |
| "Tumbling Down" | 2017 | Rationale | Rationale | Co-writer/Producer | Tinashe Fazakerley, Daniel Parker, John Hill | - |
| "Stay Awake, Wait for Me" | 2017 | Jessie Ware | Glasshouse | Co-writer/Producer | Jessica Ware, Daniel Parker, Alexandra Govere | - |
| "Domino" | 2017 | Jessie Ware | Glasshouse | Co-writer/Producer | Jessica Ware, Daniel Parker, Daniel Schnair, Alexandra Govere | - |
| "Love to Love" | 2017 | Jessie Ware | Glasshouse | Co-writer/Producer | Jessica Ware, Daniel Parker, Alexandra Govere | - |
| "Bliss" | 2017 | Alayna | Non-album single | Producer | - | - |
| "Cat's Cradle (Amelia)" | 2018 | Hannah Epperson | Slow Down | Co-writer/Producer | Hannah Epperson | - |
| "We Will Host a Party (Amelia)" | 2018 | Hannah Epperson | Slow Down | Co-writer/Producer | Hannah Epperson | - |
| "40 Numbers (Amelia)" | 2018 | Hannah Epperson | Slow Down | Co-writer/Producer | Hannah Epperson | - |
| "Nostalgia" | 2018 | MØ | Forever Neverland | Co-writer/Producer | Karen Marie Orsted, John Hill, Cass Lowe, Kurtis McKenzie, Michael "Scribz" Riley | Kurtis McKenzie |
| "Gentleman" | 2018 | Gallant | TBA | Co-writer/Producer | Christopher Gallant, Travis Walton | Teddy Walton, Aaron Bow |
| "Tainted" | 2018 | Alina Baraz | The Colour of You | Co-writer/Producer | Alina Baraz, Sarah Aarons | - |
| "Doesn't Matter" | 2018 | Gallant | TBA | Additional producer | - | Julian Bunetta, John Ryan |
| "Another Lifetime" | 2018 | NAO | Saturn | Co-writer/Producer | Neo Jessica Joshua, Daniel Traynor | NAO, Grades |
| "Dancing's Not a Crime" | 2018 | Panic! at the Disco | Pray for the Wicked | Co-writer/Co-producer | Brendon Urie, Jake Sinclair, John Newman, John Hill, Samuel Hollander, Kenneth Harris, Christopher Allen | - |
| "Haha No One Can Hear You!" | 2018 | Gallant | TBA | Co-writer/Producer | Christopher Gallant | - |
| "Way Down" | 2018 | MØ | Forever Neverland | Co-writer/Producer | Karen Marie Ørsted, Cara Salimando, Alexandra Govere, Letter Mbulu, Caiphus Semenya | Erik Eger, Andy Steinway, Dillon Zachara |
| "Drive and Disconnect" | 2018 | NAO | Saturn | Co-writer/Producer | Neo Jessica Joshua, Daniel Traynor, Jeff Gitelman, Sarah Aarons | NAO, Grades |
| "TOOGOODTOBETRUE" (featuring Sufjan Stevens & Rebecca Sugar) | 2018 | Gallant | TBA | Co-writer/Producer | Christopher Gallant | - |
| "Intro (Purple Like the Summer Rain)" | 2018 | MØ | Forever Neverland | Co-writer/Producer | Karen Marie Ørsted, Adam Feeney, Kurtis McKenzie, Michael "Scribz" Riley | Frank Dukes, Scribz Riley, Kurtis McKenzie, Erik Eger, Andy Steinway, Dillon Zachara |
| "I Want You" | 2018 | MØ | Forever Neverland | Co-writer/Producer | Karen Marie Ørsted, Sarah Aarons | Erik Eger, Andy Steinway, Dillon Zachara |
| "Blur" | 2018 | MØ | Forever Neverland | Co-writer/Producer | Karen Marie Ørsted, Kristoffer Fodgelmark, Albin Nedler | Monkey Business, Erik Eger, Andy Steinway, Dillon Zachara |
| "West Hollywood (Interlude)" | 2018 | MØ | Forever Neverland | Co-writer/Producer | Karen Marie Ørsted | Erik Eger, Andy Steinway, Dillon Zachara |
| "Beautiful Wreck" | 2018 | MØ | Forever Neverland | Co-writer/Producer | Karen Marie Ørsted, Kristoffer Fodgelmark, Albin Nedler, Madison Love | Erik Eger, Andy Steinway, Dillon Zachara |
| "Red Wine" (featuring Empress Of) | 2018 | MØ | Forever Neverland | Co-writer/Producer | Karen Marie Ørsted, Daniel "MantraBeats" Mizrahi, Lorely Rodriguez, Jesus Herrera | MantraBeats, Daleplay, Erik Eger, Andy Steinway, Dillon Zachara |
| "Trying to Be Good" | 2018 | MØ | Forever Neverland | Co-writer/Producer | Karen Marie Ørsted | Erik Eger, Andy Steinway, Dillon Zachara |
| "Purple Like the Summer Rain" | 2018 | MØ | Forever Neverland | Co-writer/Producer | Karen Marie Ørsted, Adam Feeney, Kurtis McKenzie, Michael "Scribz" Riley | Frank Dukes, Scribz Riley, Kurtis McKenzie, Erik Eger, Andy Steinway, Dillon Zachara |
| "Don't Change" | 2018 | NAO | Saturn | Co-writer/Producer | Neo Jessica Joshua, Daniel Traynor | NAO, Grades |
| "Raising Hell" | 2019 | Kesha | High Road | Co-writer/Producer | Kesha Sebert, Stephen Wrabel, Sean Douglas | Omega |
| "A Kiss Goodbye" | 2019 | Tei Shi | La Linda | Co-writer/Producer | Valerie Teicher | - |
| "Tonight" | 2020 | Kesha | High Road | Co-writer/Producer | Kesha Sebert, Stephen Wrabel | - |
| "Little Bit of Love" | 2020 | Kesha | High Road | Co-writer/Producer | K. Sebert, Wrabel, Nate Ruess | - |
| "Kinky" | 2020 | Kesha | High Road | Co-writer/Producer | K. Sebert, Wrabel, Sean Douglas | - |
| "Modus" | 2020 | Joji | Nectar | Co-producer | - | George Miller |
| "Comeback." | 2021 | Gallant | | Producer | - | |
| "Sleep Well" | 2023 | D4vd | Petals to Thorns | Producer | - | Spencer Stewart |
| "Fine Line" | 2023 | Kesha | Gag Order | Writer | | |
| "Only Love Can Save Us Now" | 2023 | Kesha | Gag Order | Writer | | |
| "All I Need Is You" | 2023 | Kesha | Gag Order | Writer | | |
| "Only Love Reprise" | 2023 | Kesha | Gag Order | Writer | | |
| "Hate Me Harder" | 2023 | Kesha | Gag Order | Writer | | |
| "Demigods" | 2023 | Health | Rat Wars | Producer | | |
| "Future of Hell" | 2023 | Health | Rat Wars | Producer | | |
| "Hateful" | 2023 | Health | Rat Wars | Producer | | |
| "(Of All Else)" | 2023 | Health | Rat Wars | Producer | | |
| "Crack Metal" | 2023 | Health | Rat Wars | Producer | | |
| "Unloved" | 2023 | Health | Rat Wars | Producer | | |
| "Children of Sorrow" | 2023 | Health | Rat Wars | Producer | | |
| "Sicko" | 2023 | Health | Rat Wars | Producer | | |
| "Ashamed" | 2023 | Health | Rat Wars | Producer | | |
| "(Of Being Born)" | 2023 | Health | Rat Wars | Producer | | |
| "DSM-V" | 2023 | Health | Rat Wars | Producer | | |
| "Don't Try" | 2023 | Health | Rat Wars | Producer | | |
| "Lucky Girl Syndrome" | 2024 | Illit | Super Real Me | Co-writer/Producer | Alna Hofmeyr, Annika Bennett, Shinkung, Shin Bo-eun (Jam Factory), Bang Si-hyuk, Lee Yi-jin, Noh Ju-hwan, Vincenzo, Cha Ri (153/Joombas), Na Do-yeon (153/Joombas) | |
| "Ordinary Loss" | 2025 | Health | Conflict DLC | Producer | | |
| "Burn the Candles" | 2025 | Health | Conflict DLC | Producer | | |
| "Vibe Cop" | 2025 | Health | Conflict DLC | Producer | | |
| "Trash Decade" | 2025 | Health | Conflict DLC | Producer | | |
| "Torture II" | 2025 | Health | Conflict DLC | Producer | | |
| "Antidote" | 2025 | Health | Conflict DLC | Producer | | |
| "Darkage" | 2025 | Health | Conflict DLC | Producer | | |
| "Shred Envy" | 2025 | Health | Conflict DLC | Producer | | |
| "You Died" | 2025 | Health | Conflict DLC | Producer | | |
| "Thought Leader" | 2025 | Health | Conflict DLC | Producer | | |
| "Don't Kill Yourself" | 2025 | Health | Conflict DLC | Producer | | |
| "Wasted Years" | 2025 | Health | Conflict DLC | Producer | | |
| "No Fair" | 2025 | Ari Abdul and Ella Boh | Non-album single | Co-writer/Co-producer | Ari Abdul, Ella Boh | Ella Boh |
| "Leave Me Here" | 2025 | Ari Abdul | Non-album single | Co-writer/Co-producer | Ari Abdul, Ella Boh | Ella Boh |
| "Alive" | 2025 | Ari Abdul | Non-album single | Co-writer/Co-producer | Ari Abdul, Ella Boh | Ella Boh |
| "Mine" | 2025 | Ari Abdul | Non-album single | Co-writer/Co-producer | Ari Abdul, Ella Boh | Ella Boh |
| "Enamored" | 2026 | Ari Abdul | The Void | Co-writer/Producer | Ari Abdul, Trey Campbell, Ella Boh, Salem Ilese | - |
| "Ego" | 2026 | Ari Abdul | Non-album single | Co-writer/Producer | Ari Abdul, Sarah Solovay, Peter Thomas, Jesse Fink | - |
| "A Million Daggers" | 2026 | Ella Boh | Non-album single | Co-producer | - | Ella Boh |
| "Serial Killer" | 2026 | Ella Boh | Blurry | Co-writer/Co-producer | Ella Boh | |
| "Lloronita" | 2026 | Ella Boh | Blurry | Co-writer/Co-producer | Ella Boh, JT Foley | Ella Boh |
| "Insomniac" | 2026 | Ella Boh | Blurry | Co-writer/Co-producer | Ella Boh, JT Foley | Ella Boh |
| "Pretty Baby" | 2026 | Ella Boh | Blurry | Co-writer/Co-producer | Ella Boh, Ari Abdul | Ella Boh |
| "Don't Know Me" | 2026 | Ari Abdul | The Void | Co-writer/Co-producer | Ella Boh, Ari Abdul | Ella Boh |
| "Home" | 2026 | Ari Abdul | The Void | Co-writer/Co-producer | Ella Boh, Ari Abdul, Emma Rosen, Jamil Chammas, Ellas McDaniel, Willie Cobbs | Ella Boh, Digi |
| "Seductive" | 2026 | Ari Abdul | The Void | Co-writer/Co-producer | Ari Abdul, Ella Boh, Ilsey Juber | Ella Boh |
| "Enamored" | 2026 | Ari Abdul | The Void | Co-writer/Producer | Ari Abdul, Ella Boh, Trey Campbell, Salem Ilese | - |
| "Touch Me" | 2026 | Ari Abdul | The Void | Co-writer/Co-producer | Ari Abdul, Ella Boh | Ella Boh |
| "The Void" | 2026 | Ari Abdul | The Void | Co-writer/Co-producer | Ari Abdul, Ella Boh | Ella Boh |
| "Nobody's Hero" | 2026 | Ari Abdul | The Void | Co-writer/Co-producer | Ari Abdul, Ella Boh, Rachel West | Ella Boh |
| "Dopesick" | 2026 | Ari Abdul | The Void | Co-writer/Co-producer | Ari Abdul, Ella Boh | Ella Boh |
| "FMTYLM" | 2026 | Ari Abdul | The Void | Co-writer/Co-producer | Ari Abdul, Ella Boh, Emma Rosen, Jamil Chammas | Ella Boh, Digi |
| "Change" | 2026 | Ari Abdul | The Void | Co-writer/Co-producer | Ari Abdul, Ella Boh | Ella Boh |
| "Sorry" | 2026 | Ari Abdul | The Void | Co-writer/Co-producer | Ari Abdul, Ella Boh | Ella Boh |
| "Heaven" | 2026 | Ari Abdul | The Void | Co-writer/Co-producer | Ari Abdul, Ella Boh | Ella Boh |

=== Remixes ===
- FRENSHIP & Emily Warren – "Capsize (Stint Remix)"
- Sebell – "Promiseland (Stint Remix)"
- Nila – "Body (Stint Remix)"
- Christina Perri – "Burning Gold (Stint Remix)"
- Young The Giant – "Mind Over Matter (Stint Remix)"
- Lana Del Rey – "West Coast (Stint Remix)"
- Radiohead – "Nude (Stint Remix)"
- Q-Tip – "Work It Out (Stint Remix)"
- The Belle Game – "Wait Up For You (Stint Remix)"
