= Locked & Loaded =

Single by D4vd
- Released: September 3, 2025
- Genre: Alternative pop
- Length: 2:36
- Label: Darkroom; Interscope
- Songwriters: David Burke; Jack Laboz; Jonah Rawitz
- Producers: Jack Laboz; Jonah Shy

D4vd singles chronology
| "L.O.V.E.U" (2025) | "Locked & Loaded" (2025) |

"Locked & Loaded" is a song by American singer-songwriter D4vd. It was released on September 3, 2025, through Darkroom and Interscope. The song was released as the first anthem for the battle royale game Fortnite. This is the final single from D4vd to be released before the investigation on the killing of Celeste Rivas Hernandez.

== Background ==
D4vd started as a Fortnite player before creating music. He started making original music in 2021 to use in his own Fortnite montages to avoid copyright strikes. A day before release, Fortnite and D4vd announced the collab on social media, releasing a short preview of the song on Instagram. "Locked & Loaded" was created as an anthem for the game.

The alternative pop song was released on September 3, 2025. It came with a "high-energy" animated video, featuring gameplay and footage of competitors at the Fortnite Champion Series event. The track serves as the main soundtrack song for the 2025 Fortnite Global Championship, and debutted in the video game as an emote and "jam track". Speaking about the song, D4vd stated, "Fortnite has been such a big part of my life and it’s what led me to make music in the first place. Being able to create the official anthem for [the game] feels like a true full-circle moment."

== Personnel ==
Credits have been adapted from Tidal.

- David Burke - vocals, background vocalist, composer, lyricist, engineer
- Jack Laboz - producer, composer, lyricist, engineer
- Jonah Rawitz - composer, lyricist
- Jonah Shy - producer, engineer
- Dale Becker - mastering engineer
- Rob Kinelski - mixing engineer
