= Worthless (D4vd song) =

Single by D4vd

from the EP Petals to Thorns
- Released: March 9, 2023
- Genre: Alternative rock
- Length: 2:43
- Songwriter: D4vd
- Producers: Casey Smith; Sofía Valdés; Spencer Stewart

D4vd singles chronology
"Placebo Effect" (2023)	"Worthless" (2023)	"Sleep Well" (2023)

Music video
- "Worthless" on YouTube

"Worthless" (stylized in all caps) is a single by American singer-songwriter D4vd, released on March 9, 2023, through Darkroom and Interscope Records. It is the fifth single from his debut EP, Petals to Thorns, and features alternative rock and rock 'n roll influences.

== Background ==
The Face says the song marks the ending of silence. The roaring song simultaneously is reminiscent of garage punk and SoundCloud rap.

== Charts ==
Chart performance for "Worthless"
Chart (2023)	Peak position
New Zealand Hot Singles (RMNZ)	25
