= For All We Know (Nao album) =

Studio album by Nao
- Released: 29 July 2016
- Recorded: 2014–16
- Genre: Alternative R&B; funktronica; neo soul; wonky pop; electropop; pop; funk; R&B; soul
- Length: 53:39
- Label: RCA; Little Tokyo Recordings
- Producer: GRADES; John Calvert; Nao; LOXE; A.K. Paul; ST!NT; Jungle; Christian Gregory; Miles James; Royce Junior

Nao chronology
February 15 (2015)	For All We Know (2016)	Saturn (2018)

Singles from For All We Know
- 1. "Bad Blood" Released: 22 October 2015; 2. "Fool to Love" Released: 24 February 2016; 3. "Girlfriend" Released: 23 May 2016; 4. "In the Morning" Released: 17 February 2017

For All We Know is the debut studio album by British electronic singer-songwriter Nao. It was released on 29 July 2016 by RCA and Little Tokyo Recordings. It has guest features by Abhi//Dijon and A. K. Paul, and received critical acclaim upon release.

== Recording and production ==
The concept for the album came about when Nao began to feature vocals with other artists, such as Disclosure and Mura Masa. After the collaboration that she did with Disclosure on their song "Superego", it inspired Nao to work further and deeper into that genre of music. She wanted to make an album which was to bring her to fame and, after the collaborations, wanted her fans to have something to look forward to.

The album title, For All We Know was named so after the 1934 jazz song of the same name, as a reference to the artist's background in the genre. She also opened up about the album title in a YouTube trilogy she created to tell her fans about the background of creating the album. She said, "So, for me, that kind of just sums up everything for me. It's just such a lovely message So love me, love me tonight/tomorrow was made for some/tomorrow may never come/for all we know. I just thought that was so beautiful because it just says that tomorrow is not guaranteed so anything that we want to do, we have to make it happen today and I think that just kind of sums up this journey for me". In an interview with Billboard, Nao advanced that the album was "a definite nod" to 1990s music and an attempt at transposing it to actuality.

Part of the production from the album was worked on with British DJ and electronic and R&B musician GRADES. Two of the other albums' producers such as Loxe and Jungle added a funk touch. Nao's music and voice were compared to musicians FKA twigs and Kelela.

== Critical reception ==
Professional ratings
Aggregate scores
Source	Rating
AnyDecentMusic?	7.8/10
Metacritic	82/100
Review scores
Source	Rating
AllMusic	4/5 stars
Consequence of Sound	B
Exclaim!	9/10
The Guardian	4/5 stars
The Irish Times	4/5 stars
NME	4/5
The Observer	4/5 stars
Pitchfork	7.9/10
Q	4/5 stars
Spin	8/10

Upon release, the album received critical acclaim. Metacritic, which assigns a weighted average score out of 100 to reviews from mainstream critics, For All We Know received an average score of 82 out of 100, based on 14 reviews, indicating "universal acclaim".

Writing for Exclaim!, Michael J. Warren hailed the album as "a dynamic listen from start to finish". It was also reported in a number of articles that the record and the style of music that was presented on the record could have been highly influenced on the early work of American musician Prince.

=== Accolades ===
Publication	Accolade	Year	Rank	Ref.
Ground Decibels	2016 Best Albums	2016	N/A	
The Guardian	The Best Albums of 2016	2016	39	
NME	NME's Albums of the Year 2016	2016	30	
Rough Trade	Albums of the Year	2016	70	
The Skinny	Top 50 Albums of 2016	2016	18	

== Track listing ==
For All We Know
No.	Title	Writer(s)	Producer(s)	Length
1.	"Intro (Like Velvet)"	Neo Jessica Joshua	Nao	0:36
2.	"Get to Know Ya"	Joshua; Joshua Lloyd-Watson; Thomas McFarland	Nao; Jungle	2:56
3.	"Inhale Exhale"	Joshua; Daniel Traynor	Nao; GRADES	3:03
4.	"Voice Memo 161"	Joshua; Christian Gregory; Miles James	Nao	0:23
5.	"Happy"	Joshua; Gregory; James	Nao; Gregory; James; GRADES	2:52
6.	"Voice Memo 162"	Joshua; Gregory; James	Nao	0:13
7.	"Adore You" (featuring Abhi//Dijon)	Joshua; Abhi Raju; Dijon Duenas; Leonardo Vianna Bozza	Nao; LOXE; GRADES^{[a]}	3:31
8.	"In the Morning"	Joshua; Sam Stubbings; John Calvert	Nao; Calvert	4:06
9.	"Trophy" (featuring A. K. Paul)	Joshua; Anup Kumar Paul	A. K. Paul	3:48
10.	"Bad Blood"	Joshua; Traynor	Nao; GRADES	4:00
11.	"DYWM"	Joshua; James Luke Wood	Nao; GRADES	4:55
12.	"We Don't Give A"	Joshua; Traynor; Calvert	Calvert; GRADES	3:20
13.	"Give Me a Little"	Joshua; Rowan Perkins	Nao; LOXE; GRADES	3:47
14.	"Fool to Love"	Joshua; Traynor	Nao; GRADES	3:27
15.	"Voice Memo 4 (Say Yes)"	Vidal Davis; Taurian Stropshire; Andre Harris	Nao	0:33
16.	"Blue Wine"	Joshua; Wood	Nao; Calvert	3:38
17.	"Girlfriend"	Joshua; Ajay Bhattacharyya	Nao; GRADES; Stint	3:45
18.	"Feels Like (Perfume)"	Joshua; Wood	Royce Wood Junior	4:46

For All We Know – The Remixes
No.	Title	Writer(s)	Producer(s)	Length
1.	"In the Morning" (Mura Masa Remix)	Neo Jessica Joshua; Sam Stubbings; John Calvert	Nao; Calvert; Mura Masa^{[b]}	3:36
2.	"(Feels Like) Perfume" (featuring Stormzy) (LOXE Remix)	Joshua; James Luke Wood; Michael Omari	Royce Wood Junior; LOXE^{[b]}	3:34
3.	"Get to Know Ya" (KAYTRANADA Flip)	Joshua; Joshua Lloyd-Watson; Thomas McFarland	Nao; Jungle; KAYTRANADA^{[b]}	5:07
4.	"DYWM" (Sam Gellaitry Remix)	Joshua; Wood	Nao; GRADES; Sam Gellaitry^{[b]}	4:37
5.	"Bad Blood" (SBTRKT Remix)	Joshua; Daniel Traynor	Nao; GRADES; SBTRKT^{[b]}	4:50

Notes

- ^{^[a]} signifies an additional producer
- ^{^[b]} signifies a remixer

== Charts ==
Chart (2016)	Peak position
Belgian Albums (Ultratop Flanders)	53
Dutch Albums (Album Top 100)	76
Irish Albums (IRMA)	91
New Zealand Heatseekers Albums (RMNZ)	3
Scottish Albums (OCC)	63
Swiss Albums (Schweizer Hitparade)	68
UK Albums (OCC)	17
US Top Dance Albums (Billboard)	3
