= Sofía Valdés =

Panamanian singer-songwriter

- Born: Panama City, Panama
- Genres: Pop; rock
- Occupation: Singer-songwriter
- Instrument: Guitar
- Label: Warner Records

Sofía Valdés is a Panamanian singer-songwriter, who is signed to Warner Records. She has released a studio album, three EPs and nine singles.

== Early life ==
Valdés is the great-granddaughter of Cuban vocalist Miguelito Valdés and Panamanian singer Silvia de Grasse, who performed with Louis Armstrong. She started playing the guitar at the age of eight and began to release her first official projects at the age of thirteen. Later, she attended Interlochen Arts Academy of Michigan in the United States and Liverpool Institute for Performing Arts in the United Kingdom.

== Career ==
Valdés was signed to Warner Records in 2020.

She released her first two songs, "Little Did I Know" in September 2020 and "Handful of Water" a month later, gaining some recognition. Following this, she recorded a cover of Gwen Stefani's "The Sweet Escape", which released in December of that year.

In early 2021, she released the song "Lonely", which was described by AllMusic as "downbeat, acoustically driven". The release of her debut EP Ventura, which was reviewed by NPR as incorporating "a mix of pop, soul, bossa nova, and folk", followed in February. Her subsequent EPs, In Bloom and Silvia, were released in 2022 and 2023 respectively. The latter EP was named after her great-grandmother.

In October 2024, Valdés released her debut self-titled studio album, Sofía Valdés, preceded by the single "How’s That Working Out?".

== Discography ==
=== Studio albums ===
- Sofía Valdés (2024)

=== EPs ===
- Ventura (2021)
- In Bloom (2022)
- Silvia (2023)
