= Here with Me (D4vd song) =

2022 single by D4vd

Single by D4vd

from the EP Petals to Thorns
- A-side: "Romantic Homicide"
- Released: September 22, 2022
- Length: 4:02
- Label: Darkroom; Interscope
- Songwriters: David Burke; Dan Darmawan
- Producer: Dan Darmawan

D4vd singles chronology
"Romantic Homicide" (2022)	"Here with Me" (2022)	"Placebo Effect" (2023)

Music video
- "Here with Me" on YouTube

"Here with Me" is a song by American singer-songwriter D4vd, released on September 22, 2022. The song gained popularity on the social media platform TikTok and became his second most successful track, after "Romantic Homicide".

== Background ==
The song is inspired by the 2009 film Up and the artist's romantic experiences. It parallels the relationship between the characters Carl Fredricksen and Ellie.

D4vd stated:

One day as I was watching the sun rise along the coast, I remembered when they were watching the sunrise at that picnic, and I just had to write about it while not finishing the story when Ellie dies per se, but having them grow old together and just experience life together. That was the whole meaning behind that track.

D4vd also stated that, when writing the song, he "tried to harness the parts of love that no one writes about."

== Charts ==
=== Weekly charts ===
2022–2023 weekly chart performance for "Here with Me"
Chart (2022–2023)	Peak position
Australia (ARIA)	44
Canada (Canadian Hot 100)	44
Global 200 (Billboard)	34
Ireland (IRMA)	54
Lithuania (AGATA)	54
Netherlands (Single Tip)	9
New Zealand (Recorded Music NZ)	40
Portugal (AFP)	58
Singapore (RIAS)	7
UK Singles (Official Charts)	34
US Billboard Hot 100	60
US Hot Alternative Songs (Billboard)	4

2025 weekly chart performance for "Here with Me"
Chart (2025)	Peak position
Malaysia International (RIM)	17
Philippines (Philippines Hot 100)	60

=== Year-end charts ===
Year-end chart performance for "Here with Me"
Chart (2023)	Position
Canada (Canadian Hot 100)	97
Global 200 (Billboard)	100
US Hot Rock & Alternative Songs (Billboard)	12

== Certifications ==
Certifications for "Here with Me"
Region	Certification	Certified units/sales
Australia (ARIA)	2× Platinum	140,000^{‡}
Brazil (Pro-Música Brasil)	Gold	20,000^{‡}
Canada (Music Canada)	3× Platinum	240,000^{‡}
Denmark (IFPI Danmark)	Gold	45,000^{‡}
France (SNEP)	Platinum	200,000^{‡}
Italy (FIMI)	Gold	50,000^{‡}
Mexico (AMPROFON)	Platinum	140,000^{‡}
New Zealand (RMNZ)	2× Platinum	60,000^{‡}
Poland (ZPAV)	Platinum	50,000^{‡}
Portugal (AFP)	Gold	5,000^{‡}
Spain (Promusicae)	Gold	30,000^{‡}
United Kingdom (BPI)	Platinum	600,000^{‡}
United States (RIAA)	2× Platinum	2,000,000^{‡}
Streaming
Central America (CFC)	Platinum	7,000,000^{†}
^{‡} Sales+streaming figures based on certification alone.^{†} Streaming-only figures based on certification alone.

== Release history ==
Release dates and formats for "Here with Me"
Region	Date	Format	Label(s)	Ref.
United States	June 20, 2023	Contemporary hit radio	Interscope	
