= R.LUM.R =

American singer-songwriter (born 1990)

- Born: Reginald Lamar Williams, Jr. January 18, 1990 (age 36); Bradenton, Florida, United States
- Genres: Alternative R&B; pop; soul
- Years active: 2013–present
- Labels: Island; PRMD
- Website: werlumr.com

Reginald Lamar Williams, Jr. (born January 18, 1990), known professionally as R.LUM.R, is an American alternative R&B artist from Bradenton, Florida. Previously a singer-songwriter playing classical guitar under his nickname Reggie Williams, Williams has since relocated to Nashville, Tennessee where he now resides. R.LUM.R is best known for his viral 2016 single, "Frustrated" which has garnered over 50 million plays on Spotify alone as of December 6, 2019. In 2017 NPR Music named him one of their "Artists to watch at SXSW" and called him a "fast-rising artist whose falsetto is no joke."

On August 2, 2017, R.LUM.R performed "Frustrated" and "Close Enough" on Jimmy Kimmel Live!.

== Early life ==
Reginald Lamar Williams, Jr was born in Bradenton, FL on January 18, 1990. According to Williams, much of his upbringing was characterized by difficult relationships with both his family and peers. At the age of 5, William's parents got a divorce leading to relationships with his mother, father, and sisters he describes as "tenuous". In an Uproxx mini-documentary from May 2015, he recalls asking his parents for a guitar to which they responded with laughter. Although still legally under his parents' care, Williams spent most of his teen years sleeping at friend's houses. William recalls struggling to fit in with other black youth telling Rolling Stone, "I was fat and couldn't play basketball, and I wanted to listen to Linkin Park, and only the white kids at my school wanted to do that stuff, and it's kind of like that Earl Sweatshirt line: 'Too white for the black kids, too black for the whites.' You're stuck in that shitty middle ground. So for a long time I just pretended to be into all the shit they were into.

== Origin ==
Reggie first began playing music by learning to play classical guitar while attending the Manatee School for the Arts. His first musical instrument purchased was a Yamaha CG101 from Sam Ash Music in Sarasota, Florida. At the time, Williams didn't have much of a social life, so he spent most of his time playing guitar. He says the first songs he wrote were about girls who didn't like him. While in high school, a friend persuaded Williams to perform an original song during a talent show. An introvert, Williams was reluctant but eventually relented, performing a ballad written for a close friend he had seen deal with substance abuse. "I sang that song called ‘Stay,’ because it essentially was just like, ‘I want you to take care of yourself, but I know there's nothing I can do.’ I was up there on the stage crying, pouring my heart out and I finish the song. Place is silent, and then they just like clapped for a long time. I got up, just so nerdy and weird and shit, and left." Mr. Kaiser, a music teacher he cites as an important mentor, persuaded him to return to the stage.

After high school, Williams attended the State College of Florida, Manatee-Sarasota before being granted a scholarship to go to Florida State University for music studies. He states his original aspirations were to become, the next Julian Bream or John Williams. While attending Florida State University, Williams began writing various EPs and LPs as Reggie Williams. He cites his biggest influence at the time as John Mayer. He recalls, "People like [John Mayer] were just gifted with this thing, born above the rest of us commoners, and we are just here to receive their gift…" It was during his final year of college that Williams began to contemplate his musical identity as a classical guitar player. Williams realized that it would be more beneficial to his career as a musician to go out and make commercial music rather than spend as much time studying it.

He eventually dropped out of college and relocated to Orlando, FL where his manager Chris Martignago was living at the time. Both felt that Williams could experience greater success in a bigger city with a larger music scene. Although, continuing to write and perform his acoustic folk songs, Williams created R.LUM.R while in Orlando as a side project as way to expand his creative output to multiple genres. Through online tutorials, he began to learn the basics of electronic music production.

== Career ==
In 2013, at the time Reggie moved in to his manager, Chris Martignago's, apartment in Orlando, FL, Martignago was working for Atlantic Record's A&R department. Atlantic Records had a "who's looking" list for artists such as Chris Brown and Jason DeRulo. Williams began writing songs for the purpose of sending them along to established stars to perform. Williams began working with Central Florida producer J. Cruz of Ethnikids. Cruz suggested that he and Williams get into the studio by themselves (as opposed to the common industry practice of renting a studio for a week and having multiple writers write multiple songs) and start from scratch. These sessions were where R.LUM.R's first singles, "Show Me", "Be Honest", and "Nothing New" would be written and produced. Atlantic Records was receptive and persuaded Williams to adopt the project full-time.

Suddenly, Williams had a producer that he was working with, a manager on board, and industry professionals that were interested in his new project. "Show Me" was later released to SoundCloud and Tunecore, and Spotify picked it up on their New Music Tuesday playlist. Due to the success of his first single, Williams decided to continue with R.LUM.R.

=== Relocation to Nashville and Frustrated ===
With his decision to be R.LUM.R full-time, Williams was living in Orlando and facing the upcoming ending of his lease. William's noticed that many of his professional and creative collaborators were moving to Nashville, TN and began to contemplate a relocation. Although making ends meet by playing cover shows for $150 a night in Orlando, William's decided that it was best to take a chance on his newly conceived project and make the move to a city with a larger industry presence and music scene. In December 2015, Williams moved to Nashville permanently.

In a 2017 interview with Music Publication Behind The Setlist, William's recounts his decision to relocate to Nashville,

"I could’ve gone to Atlanta or Chicago or L.A. or Portland or whatever, but those places already have a sound that you think of when you think of urban—read: black—music. L.A. has Kendrick, the beat scene. Atlanta, there’s that wonderful trap music that’s poppin’. New York City there are the boom-bap rappers. Chicago, it’s Mick Jenkins. People, you know, who have a history in those places." As a person outside looking in, I didn’t think Nashville had a lane yet for a black guy making traditional black music, you know what I’m saying? But that is an advantage. That’s a place where I can go and create my own lane."

— Reggie Williams, Behind The Setlist, 2017

The uncertainty Williams felt during his relocation to Nashville became the inspiration for his next single, "Frustrated". Once released, Spotify, who had featured R.LUM.R on their New Music Tuesday and Alternative R&B playlists previously, decided to support the new single by placing it on many of their most popular national playlists. Frustrated quickly became a hit garnering nearly 20 million streams on Spotify alone since first released in late 2016. In early 2017 Frustrated Hit No. 1 on SiriusXM The Heat's (Ch.46) Top 35 Songs out beating artists like Chris Brown, Bruno Mars and Drake. In May of 2019, R.LUM.R was the Grand Prize winner of the prestigious 2018 International Songwriting Competition (ISC) for the song "Frustrated."

In July 2017, R.LUM.R released his follow-up single "Close Enough" and accompanying lyric video as a Billboard exclusive.

On August 2, 2017, R.LUM.R performed "Frustrated" and "Close Enough" on Jimmy Kimmel Live

On August 11, 2017, R.LUM.R released his debut EP "Afterimage".

On November 1, 2019, R.LUM.R released his first full-length LP, Surfacing.

== Name ==
In a 2015 interview with popular indie Music Blog The Music Ninja, Reggie explained that the name R.LUM.R is a combination of his first and middle name.

"Growing up, I was always made to be ashamed of myself about being who I wanted to be and liking what I liked, so I hid it all. It was for a multitude of reasons, and for the sake of brevity I won't get specific, but it can mostly be boiled down to pressure to be 'blacker' and the insidious effects that has on one's psyche, but I did what I was told, and whatever I thought a person like me was supposed to do. My middle name, Lamar, was just one I never really felt attached to. So I hid that. Getting my starts in music, I played acoustic and released and performed music as a singer-songwriter for a long time, which started basically because of my limited resources, and I kept going because of the positive ways I was affecting the world around me through that medium, but there's always been another part of me that wanted to explore the stuff I’m exploring now, but never had the bravery or resources. So in the process of evolving into this music, I wanted to do something that pulled from my past and exposed all those things, but created a clear focus on the future. Reggie, my first name, is in the first R, and with it being at the beginning of R.LUM.R, it's the past, and the music I created that got me here. Though I’m evolving, I don't want to abandon where I came from. LUM is part of Lamar (my middle name) and represents the parts of myself I’d always hidden, and the present time. It means to me that I can take that stuff from back then and wear it proudly, turning it into positives. It's also the center of the idea right now, so it's fitting for it to be sitting where it is visually. The last R is the future and the person I can be, coexisting with the person i’ve always been. Lamar ends with an "r", and Reggie starts with an "r", so it's like bringing the ideas of the past and the present together, but in the future."

— Reggie Williams, The Music Ninja

== Influences ==
William's musical influences are eclectic. He cites Fleet Foxes (once calling their song "Someone You’d Admire" one of the best songs ever written) and Sufjan Stevens, particularly his album Seven Swans as the reason he made it through his last year of college. Ray LaMontagne’s album Gossip in the Grain, particularly the song, "Let it Be Me" and The National’s album Boxer have also been listed as music that influences him. In a May 2017 interview with Behind The Setlist, Williams said, "I pull influences from a lot of places, not just R&B or black music. You know that Elliott Smith record Either/Or? I posted that up and some girl was like, ‘What! You like Elliott Smith?’ I'm like, ‘Yeah, of course.’ He's super sad, but he's got these beautiful, fantastic melodies." Other influences mentioned by Williams in interviews include Radiohead, The Mars Volta, King Crimson, Coheed and Cambria, Contortionist, Linkin Park, Yes, Dream Theater, Liquid Tension Experiment, and My Chemical Romance.

== Reception ==
In 2016, NPR Music labelled R.LUM.R a "fast-rising artist whose falsetto is no joke" and spotlighted him as "an Artist To Watch at SXSW". In July 2017, with the release of single "Close Enough", Billboard contributor Saddie Bell wrote, "If his sound could be placed in four walls, it feels as if he could tear them down with a single bombastic beat," while Clash Magazine marveled at his ability to "pluck at heart-strings while moving the waist." In an article accompanying an exclusive release of his single "Be Honest", Music blog Earmilk praised his "highly complex set of vocal skills". The Music Ninja also applauded his musical prowess, writing that he made music "fusing soul, pop, R&B and dance in a way that's as unique as it is exciting." Vibe Magazine also complimented his unique sound calling him "an artist unapologetic about his quirks". In addition, he spent 6 months as the face of Spotify's Alt R&B playlist, and is now prominently featured in their biggest playlists, including Are and Be, The Newness, Chilled R&B, among several others.

== Discography ==
- After Image EP (PRMD Music, 2017)
- Surfacing (2019)
