= Grades (record producer) =

- Born: Daniel Traynor
- Origin: London, England
- Years active: 2008–present
- Website: soundcloud.com/Gradesofficial

Grades (born Daniel Traynor) is an English producer, songwriter and DJ based in London. His music encompasses elements of R&B, Hip Hop, 2step, House and Electronic.

== Career ==
As an artist/DJ, Grades’ first original track "Freedom" was released in April 2014 and was featured by Annie Mac in her Free Music Mondays download series. He followed the release of "Freedom" with a remix of Lana Del Rey’s "West Coast" which reached number 3 at Hype Machine. Grades’ second single "Owe It To Yourself" was premiered in June by Mixmag who compared him to artists such as Bondax and Kaytranada. Grades went on to remix Hot Natured, Ellie Goulding, Labrinth, Becky Hill, Lianne La Havas & many more.

Later in the year, Grades co-wrote & produced Bastille’s single "Torn Apart" which featured on the "Vs. (Other People’s Heartache pt. III)" project. His third single "Crocodile Tears", featuring vocals from songwriter Caroline Ailin, was premiered by Vice’s music channel Noisey.

Grades has received radio play from Zane Lowe, Pete Tong, MistaJam, Nick Grimshaw, Huw Stephens and Annie Mac at BBC Radio 1, and had his own KISS FM radio show from 2016-17.

Within 2016, he began working with NAO on her debut studio album For All We Know (including "Bad Blood", "Fool To Love" & "Girlfriend") produced and featured on Sinead Harnett's "If You Let Me", and co-wrote a song ft. Mr Hudson on DJ Snake's number 1 Billboard album Encore. He produced Julian Peretta's "I Cry" which was #3 most played song on French radio during 2016.

Grades went on to work on tracks for H.E.R, Tinie Tempah, Tinashe, Aanysa, Snakehips as well as Dua Lipa & Khalid on their multi-platinum albums.

Grades was nominated for a Grammy in 2017 for his work on the Khalid album American Teen, alongside producer Scribz Riley.

== Discography ==
=== Singles ===
==== as lead artist ====
- "I Wanna Be Down" (2014) (vs. Brandy)
- "Rock The Boat" (2014) (vs. Aaliyah)
- "Torn Apart" (2014) (vs. Bastille)
- "Freedom" (2014)
- "Owe It To Yourself" (2014)
- "Crocodile Tears" (2014)
- "King" (2015)

==== as featured artist ====
- "If You Let Me" (2016) (Sinead Harnett featuring Grades)

=== Songwriting and production credits ===
Title	Year	Artist(s)	Album	Credits	Written with	Produced with
"Screw You" (featuring Wretch 32)	2012	Cheryl	A Million Lights	Co-writer	Meghan Thomaston, Kingsley Brown, Jermaine Scott	-
"Good Together"	2014	Tom Aspaul	Revelation	Co-writer/Producer	Tom Aspaul	-
"Wolves (Intro)"	2014	Tom Aspaul	Revelation	Co-writer/Producer	Tom Aspaul	-
"Revelation"	2014	Tom Aspaul	Revelation	Co-writer/Producer	Tom Aspaul	-
"Those Girls"	2015	Karen Harding	Non-album single	Co-writer/Producer	Karen Harding, Tom Aspaul	-
"Do It Well" (featuring Tom Aspaul)	2015	XYConstant	Non-album single	Co-writer/Producer	Alfie Coleman, Tom Aspaul	XYConstant, Mark Ralph
"Working Girl"	2015	Little Boots	Working Girl	Co-writer/Producer	Victoria Hesketh, Tom Aspaul	-
"Inhale Exhale"	2015	NAO	For All We Know	Co-writer/Producer	Neo Jessica Joshua	NAO
"Bad Blood"	2015	NAO	For All We Know	Co-writer/Producer	Neo Jessica Joshua	NAO
"Fool to Love"	2016	NAO	For All We Know	Co-writer/Producer	Neo Jessica Joshua	NAO
"Talk"	2016	Tiffany	I Just Wanna Dance EP	Co-writer/Producer	Caroline Ailin, Nicola Roberts	-
"Girlfriend"	2016	NAO	For All We Know	Producer	-	NAO, ST!NT
"Adore You" (featuring Abhi//Dijon)	2016	NAO	For All We Know	Additional producer	-	NAO, LOXE
"Happy"	2016	NAO	For All We Know	Producer	-	NAO, Christian Gregory, Miles James
"DYWM"	2016	NAO	For All We Know	Producer	-	NAO
"We Don't Give A"	2016	NAO	For All We Know	Co-writer/Producer	Neo Jessica Joshua, John Calvert	John Calvert
"Give Me A Little"	2016	NAO	For All We Know	Producer	-	NAO, LOXE
"If You Let Me" (featuring GRADES)	2016	Sinéad Harnett	Sinéad Harnett EP	Featured artist/Co-writer/Producer	Sinéad Harnett	-
"I Cry"	2016	Julian Perretta	Karma	Co-writer/Producer	Julian Perretta	-
"Wait For You"	2016	Fantasia	The Definition Of...	Co-writer/Producer	Sasha Keable, Scott Hoffman, Vanya Taylor	-
"Here Comes the Night" (featuring Mr Hudson)	2016	DJ Snake	Encore	Co-writer/Producer	William Grigachine, Benjamin Hudson McIldowie	DJ Snake
"It Was My Party Last Night"	2016	GIRLI	Non-album single	Co-writer/Producer	Milly Toomey	-
"Never Complaining"	2016	Tom Aspaul	Left EP	Co-writer	Tom Aspaul	-
"Burn Break Crash" (with Snakehips)	2016	Aanysa	Non-album single	Co-writer/Producer	Caroline Ailin, Tom Aspaul	Snakehips
"Text from Your Ex" (featuring Tinashe)	2017	Tinie Tempah	Youth	Co-writer/Producer	Patrick Okugwu, Ina Wroldsen, Timucin Aluo	Jax Jones
"Lies In The Dark"	2017	Tove Lo	Fifty Shades Darker OST	Co-writer/Producer	Tove Nilsson, Mike "Scribz" Riley	Jason Gill, Scribz Riley
"Cover Up"	2017	Taeyeon	My Voice	Co-writer/Producer	Caroline Ailin, Realmeee	-
"No Goodbyes"	2017	Dua Lipa	Dua Lipa	Co-writer/Co-producer	Dua Lipa, Lindy Robbins, Ilsey Juber	KOZ
"Still Miss You"	2017	Sinead Harnett	Chapter One	Producer	-	-
"Lights On"	2017	H.E.R.	H.E.R.	Co-writer/Producer	Gabriella Wilson, Mike "Scribz" Riley, Talay Riley	H.E.R., Scribz Riley
"Winter"	2017	Khalid	American Teen	Producer	-	Scribz Riley
"Landslide" (featuring DJ Khaled)	2017	Toby Randall	One EP	Co-writer/Producer	Helen Culver, John Mitchell	Carmen Reece, Anais Aida
"One Shot Two Shot"		BoA	One Shot Two shot Mini album	Co-writer/Producer	Caroline Ailin	
"New Religion"	2018	Maad	TBA	Co-writer/Producer	Maad Moiselle, Kate Stewart, Chiara Hunter, Ashley Milton, Daniel Goudie	-
"Bad Vibe"	2018	M.O Ft. Lotto Boyz & Mr Eazi	TBA	Co-writer/Producer	Scott Hoffman, Oladayo Olatunji, Oluwatosin Ajibade	Lorna Blackwood
"Body"	2018	Sinead Harnett	TBA	Co-writer/Producer	Sinead Harnett	-
"Brake Lights" (featuring Nao)	2018	Cosha	R.I.P. Bonzai	Co-writer	Cassia "Cosha" O'Reilly, Alexander Crossan, Francis White, Neo Jessica Joshua	-
"U Better"	2018	Cosha	R.I.P. Bonzai	Co-writer/Producer	Cassia "Cosha" O'Reilly	Mura Masa
"This Life"	2018	Cosha	R.I.P. Bonzai	Co-writer/Producer	Cassia "Cosha" O'Reilly	Mura Masa
"Another Lifetime"	2018	NAO	Saturn	Co-writer/Producer	Neo Jessica Joshua, Ajay Bhattacharya	NAO, ST!NT
"Name On It" (featuring Burna Boy)	2018	Four of Diamonds	TBA	Co-writer/Producer	Tre Jean-Marie, Oladay Olatunji, Damini Ogulu	Tre Jean-Marie, Dyo
"Karma"	2018	Years & Years	Palo Santo	Co-writer/Producer	Olly Alexander, Sarah Hudson, Clarence Coffee Jr.	Clarence Coffee Jr.
"Time in a Tree"	2018	Raleigh Ritchie	Andy	Producer	-	-
"Make It Out Alive" (featuring SiR)	2018	NAO	Saturn	Co-writer/Producer	Neo Jessica Joshua, Clarence Coffee Jr., Sir Darryl Farris	NAO
"Drive and Disconnect"	2018	NAO	Saturn	Co-writer/Producer	Neo Jessica Joshua, Ajay Battacharya, Jeff Gitelman, Sarah Aarons	NAO, ST!NT
"Curiosity"	2018	NAO	Saturn	Co-writer/Producer	Neo Jessica Joshua, Alexandra Yatchenko, Henry Allen, Yvette "Naala" Riby-Williams	NAO, LOXE, King Henry
"Wondering"	2018	M.O Ft. Chip	Non-album single	Co-writer/Producer	Ali Ahmed, Jahmaal Fyfe, Oladayo Olatunji	-
"If You Ever"	2018	NAO	Saturn	Vocal producer	-	NAO, Mura Masa
"When Saturn Returns (Interlude)"	2018	NAO	Saturn	Producer	-	NAO
"Saturn" (featuring Kwabs)	2018	NAO	Saturn	Co-writer/Producer	Neo Jessica Joshua, Rowan Perkins, Daniel Caesar	NAO, LOXE
"Gabriel"	2018	NAO	Saturn	Co-writer/Producer	Neo Jessica Joshua, Joseph Price, James Luke Wood	NAO, Royce Wood Junior
"Orbit"	2018	NAO	Saturn	Co-writer/Producer	Neo Jessica Joshua, James Ryan Ho	NAO
"Love Supreme"	2018	NAO	Saturn	Co-writer/Producer	Neo Jessica Joshua, James Luke Wood, Rowan Perkins	NAO, LOXE
"Don't Change"	2018	NAO	Saturn	Co-writer/Producer	Neo Jessica Joshua, Ajay Battacharya	NAO, ST!NT
"Yellow of the Sun"	2018	NAO	Saturn	Co-writer/Producer	Neo Jessica Joshua, Joel Little	NAO, Joel Little
