= Sleep Well (D4vd song) =

Single by D4vd

from the EP Petals to Thorns
- Released: April 13, 2023
- Length: 2:55
- Label: Darkroom; Interscope
- Songwriter: David Burke
- Producers: Spencer Stewart; Ajay Bhattacharyya

D4vd singles chronology
"Worthless" (2023)	"Sleep Well" (2023)	"Don't Forget About Me" (2023)

Music video
- "Sleep Well" on YouTube

"Sleep Well" is a single by American singer-songwriter D4vd, released on April 13, 2023, through Darkroom and Interscope Records as the fifth single from his debut EP, Petals to Thorns. The song achieved commercial success, receiving a gold certification from Pro-Música Brasil and Music Canada.

== Background and performance ==
Sleep Well" is a ballad-type song by D4vd. It received gold certifications from Pro-Música Brasil and Music Canada and commercial success. The song was released in April 2023 as a single from the debut EP, Petals to Thorns, under Darkroom and Interscope Records.

== Critical reception ==
Rouhani Neena and Lee Cydney of Billboard said the song is reminiscent of D4vd's "lovelorn" lyricism. Alysse Calabio of The Central Trend called the song "ethereal".

== Charts ==
Chart performance for "Sleep Well"
Chart (2023)	Peak position
New Zealand Hot Singles (RMNZ)	22

== Certifications ==
Certifications for "Sleep Well"
Region	Certification	Certified units/sales
Brazil (Pro-Música Brasil)	Gold	20,000^{‡}
Canada (Music Canada)	Gold	40,000^{‡}
^{‡} Sales+streaming figures based on certification alone.
