= Placebo Effect (song) =

2025 single by D4vd

Single by D4vd
- Released: February 8, 2023
- Length: 3:11
- Label: Darkroom; Interscope
- Songwriter: David Burke
- Producer: Dan Darmawan

D4vd singles chronology
"Here with Me" (2022)	"Placebo Effect" (2023)	"Worthless" (2023)

Music video
- "Placebo Effect" on YouTube

"Placebo Effect" is a song by American singer-songwriter D4vd. It was released by Darkroom and Interscope Records on February 28, 2023. It was produced by Dan Darmawan.

== Background ==
The song explores the theme of unrequited love.

== Charts ==
Chart performance for "Placebo Effect"
Chart (2023)	Peak position
New Zealand Hot Singles (RMNZ)	38
