= Romantic Homicide =

2022 single by D4vd

- Initial 2022 release cover

Single by D4vd

from the EP Petals to Thorns
- B-side: "Here with Me"
- Released: July 20, 2022
- Recorded: July 13, 2022
- Genre: Bedroom pop
- Length: 2:12
- Label: Darkroom; Interscope
- Songwriter: David Burke
- Producer: Dan Darmawan

D4vd singles chronology
"D.T.N" (2022)	"Romantic Homicide" (2022)	"Here with Me" (2022)

Music video
- "Romantic Homicide" on YouTube

"Romantic Homicide" is a bedroom pop song by American singer-songwriter D4vd. It was released on July 20, 2022, through DistroKid and later included as the second single from his debut EP, Petals to Thorns. The song gained popularity on the social media platform TikTok in September 2022 and was re-released by Darkroom and Interscope, leading to commercial success. In 2025, the song re-entered the charts following the discovery of Celeste Rivas Hernandez's body in a Tesla vehicle registered to D4vd.

== Background and composition ==
D4vd recorded the song in his sister's closet and initially released it in July 2022. By early September, it had been featured in over 245,000 TikTok clips.

The song features "heavy guitars" and "sentimental percussions", exploring themes of unrequited love and breakups and is characterized by its short lyrics, described as having a "more profound meaning".

== Release ==
After gaining popularity on TikTok, it was released on July 20, 2022, through DistroKid, and later included as the second single from D4vd's debut EP, Petals to Thorns, released in 2023.

A live version of the song, along with a visualizer, was released on December 8, 2023, by Darkroom and Interscope.

The album cover is a stolen and edited desktop wallpaper made by artist Charli Siebert. The website where it was hosted closed in 2007.

== Music video ==
The music video for the song was released on September 7, 2022. Inspired by film noir and anime, it features an alter ego named Itami, meaning "pain" in Japanese. Directed by Tommy Kiljoy, the video depicts the character mourning and moving on from a relationship.

== Charts ==
After faring well in the charts on its first release, in 2025, the song re-entered the Billboard Hot 100 at No. 38 following the discovery of 14-year-old Celeste Rivas Hernandez's body in a Tesla registered to D4vd. It also climbed 102 places to number 42 on Spotify's Global Top 50, and was number 13 in US Spotify by September 20, 2025.

=== Weekly charts ===
2022–2023 weekly chart performance for "Romantic Homicide"
Chart (2022–2023)	Peak position
Australia (ARIA)	40
Canada (Canadian Hot 100)	32
Czech Republic Singles Digital (ČNS IFPI)	68
Global 200 (Billboard)	35
Greece International (IFPI)	20
Ireland (IRMA)	27
Lithuania (AGATA)	13
Malaysia International (RIM)	9
Netherlands (Single Tip)	4
New Zealand (Recorded Music NZ)	21
Portugal (AFP)	45
Singapore (Billboard)	23
Singapore (RIAS)	18
Slovakia (Singles Digitál Top 100)	52
Sweden Heatseeker (Sverigetopplistan)	2
UK Singles (Official Charts)	22
US Billboard Hot 100	33
US Hot Rock & Alternative Songs (Billboard)	4
US Alternative Airplay (Billboard)	30

2025 weekly chart performance for "Romantic Homicide"
Chart (2025)	Peak position
Global 200 (Billboard)	30
Norway (IFPI Norge)	81
Sweden Heatseeker (Sverigetopplistan)	1
Switzerland (Schweizer Hitparade)	82
US Billboard Hot 100	38

=== Year-end charts ===
2022 year-end chart performance for "Romantic Homicide"
Chart (2022)	Position
US Hot Rock & Alternative Songs (Billboard)	18

2023 year-end chart performance for "Romantic Homicide"
Chart (2023)	Position
Global 200 (Billboard)	163
US Hot Rock & Alternative Songs (Billboard)	10

2025 year-end chart performance for "Romantic Homicide"
Chart (2025)	Position
US Hot Rock & Alternative Songs (Billboard)	90

== Certifications ==
Certifications for "Romantic Homicide"
Region	Certification	Certified units/sales
Australia (ARIA)	2× Platinum	140,000^{‡}
Brazil (Pro-Música Brasil)	Platinum	40,000^{‡}
Canada (Music Canada)	4× Platinum	320,000^{‡}
Denmark (IFPI Danmark)	Gold	45,000^{‡}
France (SNEP)	Platinum	200,000^{‡}
Italy (FIMI)	Gold	50,000^{‡}
Mexico (AMPROFON)	Platinum	140,000^{‡}
New Zealand (RMNZ)	3× Platinum	90,000^{‡}
Norway (IFPI Norway)	Gold	30,000^{‡}
Poland (ZPAV)	Platinum	50,000^{‡}
Portugal (AFP)	Gold	5,000^{‡}
Spain (Promusicae)	Gold	30,000^{‡}
United Kingdom (BPI)	Platinum	600,000^{‡}
United States (RIAA)	3× Platinum	3,000,000^{‡}
Streaming
Central America (CFC)	Platinum	7,000,000^{†}
Greece (IFPI Greece)	Gold	1,000,000^{†}
^{‡} Sales+streaming figures based on certification alone.^{†} Streaming-only figures based on certification alone.
