= Where'd It Go Wrong? =

2024 single by D4vd

Single by D4vd

from the album Withered
- Released: December 19, 2024
- Genre: R&B
- Length: 4:11
- Label: Darkroom; Interscope
- Songwriter: D4vd
- Producers: Tyler Spry; Velvet

D4vd singles chronology
"Remember Me" (2024)	"Where'd It Go Wrong?" (2024)	"One More Dance" (2025)

Music video
- "Where'd It Go Wrong?" on YouTube

"Where'd It Go Wrong?" is a song by American singer-songwriter D4vd. It is the lead single from his debut studio album, Withered.

== Background and music video ==
The song is a single from D4vd's debut studio album, Withered. It was released on December 19, 2024, and on December 20, 2024 for other time zones. The official music video, directed by Tommy Kiljoy, was filmed at an abandoned house.

"I've spent the past year recording in LA studios, doing sessions with top producers, and doing writing trips, but for 'Where'd It Go Wrong?,' I sat back down at my house in Houston and recorded on Bandlab which I hadn't been doing much of lately. It really got me back in my element of how I began making music. This is one of my favorite songs that I've made in a long time and it reminded me why I've always loved making music on my own."

== Composition and reception ==
"Where'd It Go Wrong?" was recorded and mixed in BandLab. Notion described the song as a mix between alternative, indie, and R&B.

== Personnel ==
- Rob Kinelski – mixing
- Velvet – electric guitar
- Tyler Spry – guitar
- Joe Henderson – drums
- Rob Kinelski – mixing engineer
