= Withered (album) =

2025 studio album by D4vd

Studio album by D4vd
- Released: April 25, 2025
- Recorded: 2023–2025
- Genres: Alternative R&B; indie pop; bedroom pop
- Length: 48:00
- Labels: Darkroom; Interscope
- Producers: Jack Hallenbeck; Tyler Spry; Velvet; Silentsky; Ryan Tedder; Scott James; Harry Charles; Gray Toomey; Matt Maltese; Zach Ezzy

D4vd chronology
Withering (2024)	Withered (2025)

Singles from Withered
- 1. "Where'd It Go Wrong?" Released: December 19, 2024; 2. "One More Dance" Released: February 7, 2025; 3. "Crashing" Released: February 28, 2025; 4. "What Are You Waiting For" Released: March 28, 2025; 5. "Is This Really Love?" Released: April 25, 2025

Deluxe edition cover
- Planned Withered Deluxe: Marcescence cover

Singles from Withered Deluxe: Marcescence
- 1. "Always Love" Released: June 27, 2025; 2. "L.O.V.E.U" Released: August 1, 2025

Withered (stylized in all caps) is the only studio album by the American singer-songwriter D4vd, released on April 25, 2025. Before the album, D4vd gained recognition with his debut single "Romantic Homicide" and signed with Darkroom and Interscope Records. He released two EPs, Petals to Thorns and The Lost Petals in 2023, collaborating with producers such as Tyler Spry, Ryan Tedder, and Harry Charles, among others. The album delves into themes of heartbreak, emotional isolation, and personal growth. Following the discovery of the remains of teenager Celeste Rivas Hernandez in a Tesla automobile registered to D4vd in September 2025, the album's promotional tour was cut short and a planned deluxe edition was shelved.

== Background and composition ==
D4vd rose to prominence in 2022 with his hit single "Romantic Homicide", which gained traction on TikTok. By 2025, he amassed over 31 million monthly listeners on Spotify and signed with Interscope Records. It follows his earlier EPs, Petals to Thorns and The Lost Petals, and explores themes of heartbreak, emotional isolation, and personal growth. His album Withered features 15 tracks blending melodic pop, indie R&B, ambient sounds, and lo-fi textures. The album was released through Darkroom and Interscope Records. D4vd had said the album took two years to finish. The album landed at number thirteen on Billboard 200 chart within two weeks of release. Lyrically, the album explores love, identity, and emotional decay. D4vd described it as a "culmination of everything [he's] tried to say musically" since his debut.

== Release and promotion ==
Withered features previously released singles. These singles include "Where'd It Go Wrong?", (December 19, 2024). "One More Dance", (February 7, 2025). "Crashing", which features Kali Uchis, (February 28). "What Are You Waiting For", (March 28), and "Is This Really Love" (April 25). Additionally, the song "Feel It", written by D4vd for the TV series Invincible, is included on various versions of the album.

D4vd promoted the album with the "Withered World Tour", performing in cities across North America and Europe. The opening concert in Houston was livestreamed and included unreleased tracks. An album showcase occurred at SM Mall of Asia in Pasay City. An expanded edition of the album was released on BandLab with two exclusive bonus tracks.

On May 30, 2025, D4vd released "Withered (Bonus Tracks)", a single containing the BandLab-exclusive tracks "Where Did You Go?" and "Unrequited" on streaming platforms and added them to the album's tracklist. He announced a deluxe edition of the album on August 1, 2025, titled Withered Deluxe: Marcescence, featuring guest appearances from Malcolm Todd, RealestK, Hyunjin, Keshi, Hannah Bahng, and Julia Wolf. However, on September 18, a day before its planned release of September 19, it was shelved due to ongoing investigations following the discovery of a body in a Tesla registered to D4vd.

It was revealed Interscope Records quietly dropped D4vd by the end of 2025 months before his arrest in April. Withered with bonus tracks was digitally reissued on September 26, 2025, under the imprint "D4vd Ent, LLC".

== Critical reception ==
Professional ratings
Review scores
Source	Rating
AllMusic	4/5 stars
Dork	4/5 stars
Rolling Stone	3.5/5 stars

The album received positive reviews from critics, who praised its emotional depth and genre versatility. It was noted for its cinematic production and intimate songwriting, continuing the melancholic but hopeful tone of D4vd's earlier works. Will Dukes of Rolling Stone described the album as a "viral hitmaker affectingly mixes indie pop and R&B on his debut LP" adding that "pent-up emotions, regrets, and bestial longings all burst forth in an expansive baritone whose confident quietism distinguishes him from other wispier alt-centric brooders like Daniel Caesar."

== Commercial performance ==
With over 521 million streams on Spotify, Withered sold 30,000 copies in the United States, reaching number 13 on the Billboard 200 chart. It debuted in the top three on the Billboard Top Rock & Alternative Albums chart, marking D4vd's first top three entry. Also on the week of its release, it was number 71 on the ARIA Album Chart and number 31 in New Zealand.

== Track listing ==
Withered vinyl edition track listing
No.	Title	Writer(s)	Producer(s)	Length
1.	"Atomic Land"	David Burke; Jack Hallenbeck; Silentsky	Scott James; Hallenbeck; Silentsky	4:08
2.	"Sky"	Burke; Hallenbeck; James; Silentsky	James; Hallenbeck; Silentsky	3:33
3.	"You Left Me First"	Burke; Tyler Spry; Harry Charles	Spry; Charles	3:02
4.	"Say It Back"	Burke; Hallenbeck; James; Silentsky; Spry	James; Hallenbeck; Silentsky; Spry	3:05
5.	"Friend Again"	Burke; Hallenbeck; Silentsky; Spry	James; Hallenbeck; Silentsky; Spry	3:37
6.	"Somewhere in the Middle"	Burke; Hallenbeck; James; Silentsky	James; Hallenbeck; Silentsky	3:40
7.	"Crashing" (with Kali Uchis)	Burke; Karly Marina Loaiza; Spry; Velvet	Spry	3:08
8.	"Is This Really Love?"	Burke; Ryan Tedder; Spry	Spry; Tedder	3:16
9.	"What Are You Waiting For"	Burke; Spry	Spry	2:24
10.	"One More Dance"	Burke; Tedder; Spry; Charles	Spry; Charles	3:09
11.	"Ghost"	Burke; James; Hallenbeck; Silentsky; Matt Maltese	James; Hallenbeck; Silentsky; Maltese	3:18
12.	"Afterlife"	Burke; James; Hallenbeck; Silentsky; Zach Ezzy	James; Hallenbeck; Silentsky; Ezzy	4:09

Withered CD and digital standard edition bonus tracks
No.	Title	Writer(s)	Producer(s)	Length
8.	"Invisible String Theory (Interlude)"		James; Hallenbeck; Silentsky	1:40
10.	"Where'd It Go Wrong?"	Burke; Spry; Velvet	Spry	4:11

Withered digital bonus edition bonus track
No.	Title	Writer(s)	Producer(s)	Length
11.	"Feel It"	Burke; Noah Ehler; Sam Homaee; Gray Toomey	Ehler; Homaee; Toomey	2:37

Withered digital special edition bonus tracks
No.	Title	Writer(s)	Producer(s)	Length
14.	"Unrequited"	Burke; Mike Zara	Zara; Noah Ehler	3:03
16.	"Where Did You Go?"	Burke; Velvet	Dan Darmawan	3:14

Withered Deluxe: Marcescence planned track listing (Disc 2)
No.	Title	Writer(s)	Producer(s)	Length
1.	"Favorite"			2:44
2.	"Issues"			1:50
3.	"Take the Photos" (featuring Malcolm Todd)			2:25
4.	"How Do You Sleep?"			2:21
5.	"You Still Love Me"			2:30
6.	"Best Friend" (featuring RealestK)			1:57
7.	"I'm Good"			2:50
8.	"Always Love" (with Hyunjin)	Burke; Andrew Luce; William Kevany	Luce; LeeLee	3:18
9.	"11PM"			2:55
10.	"Summer Don't End" (featuring Keshi)			3:31
11.	"Talking to Myself"			3:05
12.	"Affirmation"			2:50
13.	"L.O.V.E.U" (featuring Hannah Bahng)	Burke; Bahng; Luke Costelloe	Luce; Costelloe	3:20
14.	"Glue" (featuring Julia Wolf)			3:01
15.	"Frontline"			2:03

=== Notes ===
- "Crashing" was removed from digital stores and streaming services on September 27, 2025, at Uchis' request, following D4vd's involvement in the death of Celeste Rivas Hernandez.
- "L.O.V.E.U" was removed from digital stores and streaming services on April 29, 2026, following D4vd's arrest and subsequent murder charges on April 16 and April 20 respectively.
- "Always Love" was removed from digital stores and streaming services on August 11, 2026.

== Personnel ==
- David Burke – vocals, songwriting, production
- Karly Marina Loaiza – composer, lyricist, vocalist, guest vocals (track 7)
- Tyler Spry – producer, (all tracks; except "Feel It", "Somewhere In The Middle", "Ghost", Afterlife", "Invisible String Theory") composer, lyricist
- Jack Hallenbeck – producer
- Dane Orr – tenor saxophone
- Caleb Laven – recording, engineer
- Emanuel Pavon – cello
- Zach Ezzy – flugelhorn (15), electric piano, electric guitar
- Joe Henderson – digital editing, drum kit (10), drum programmer
- Harry Charles – composer, lyricist
- Rob Kinelski – mixer, engineer
- Thomas Wolseley – digital editing

- Ivan Handwerk – secondary engineer (11)
- Silentsky – producer (all, except tracks "You Left Me First")
- Scott James – acoustic guitar, piano (15)
- Dave Kutch – mastering, engineer
- Ian Thomas – percussion
- Evie Oldfield – recording, engineer
- Will Marshall – violin, viola (8)
- Ian Fogerty – recording (3)
- Nate Lotz – drums, programmer
- Trevor Taylor – mixing, secondary engineer
- Lucio Westmoreland – composer, lyricist, electric guitar (all tracks, except "Say It Back")
- Ryan Tedder – composer, lyricist (9, 13) producer (9)
- Velvet – producer, electric guitar, bass (7, 10)

== Charts ==
Chart performance for Withered
Chart (2025)	Peak position
Australian Albums (ARIA)	71
Belgian Albums (Ultratop Flanders)	200
Canadian Albums (Billboard)	66
French Rock & Metal Albums (SNEP)	14
New Zealand Albums (RMNZ)	31
Norwegian Albums (VG-lista)	68
Portuguese Albums (AFP)	195
UK Albums Chart Update (Official Charts)	98
US Billboard 200	13
US Top Rock & Alternative Albums (Billboard)	3

== Release history ==
Release history for Withered
Region	Date	Format	Label	Ref.
Various	April 25, 2025	CD; digital download; streaming	Darkroom; Interscope	
