= Arcane League of Legends: Season 2 =

Arcane League of Legends: Season 2 (Soundtrack from the Animated Series)

Soundtrack album by Arcane & League of Legends Music
- Released: November 23, 2024
- Genre: Soundtrack
- Length: 62:56
- Label: Riot Games; Virgin; UMG

Arcane & League of Legends Music chronology
Arcane League of Legends (Soundtrack from the Animated Series) (2021)	Arcane League of Legends: Season 2 (Soundtrack from the Animated Series) (2024)

Singles from Arcane League of Legends: Season 2 (Soundtrack from the Animated Series)
- 1. "Paint the Town Blue" Released: September 5, 2024; 2. "Come Play" Released: October 16, 2024; 3. "Blood Sweat & Tears" Released: October 26, 2024; 4. "Remember Me" Released: November 15, 2024; 5. "The Line" Released: November 22, 2024; 6. "Ma meilleure ennemie" Released: December 6, 2024

Arcane League of Legends: Season 2 (Soundtrack from the Animated Series) is the soundtrack to the second and final season of the 2021 animated television series Arcane, set in Riot Games' League of Legends fictional universe. Consisting of 22 tracks, it was released on November 23, 2024, through Riot Games' music division.

The album was preceded by the singles "Paint the Town Blue" by Ashnikko, "Come Play" by Stray Kids, Young Miko, and Tom Morello, and "Blood Sweat & Tears" by Sheryl Lee Ralph, before the release of the season's first three episodes. The songs "Remember Me" by D4vd, "The Line" by Twenty One Pilots, and "Ma meilleure ennemie" by Stromae and Pomme were also released as singles on November 15, November 22 and December 6 respectively. An extended edition was released on April 4, 2025. "Remember Me" was delisted from streaming services by Riot Games in May 2026, after D4vd was charged with the killing of Celeste Rivas Hernandez.

== Original soundtrack ==
=== Track listing ===
Arcane League of Legends: Season 2, Original Soundtrack
No.	Title	Writer(s)	Artist(s)	Length
1.	"Heavy Is the Crown (Original Score)"	Mike Shinoda; Mako	Emily Armstrong, Mike Shinoda	1:41
2.	"I Can't Hear It Now"	Mako	Freya Ridings	2:41
3.	"Sucker"	Mako	Marcus King	3:44
4.	"Renegade (We Never Run)"	Raja Kumari; Stefflon Don; Jarina De Marco; Empress Of; Adrianne Gonzalez; Sebastien Najand	Raja Kumari, Stefflon Don featuring Jarina De Marco	3:25
5.	"Hellfire"	Jason Aalon Butler; Najand; Mako	Fever 333	2:44
6.	"To Ashes and Blood"	Woodkid; Tepr; Mako	Woodkid	4:05
7.	"Paint the Town Blue"	Ashnikko; Slinger	Ashnikko	1:54
8.	"Remember Me (Intro)"	D4vd; Noah Ehler; Gray Toomey	D4vd	1:40
9.	"Remember Me"	D4vd; Ehlher; Jack Hallenbeck; Scott James; Toomey; Lucio Westmoreland	D4vd	2:02
10.	"这样很好 (Isha's Song)"	Zheng Nan; Lyu Yiqiu	Eason Chan	4:24
11.	"Cocktail Molotov"	Zand; Daniel Weller	Zand	2:28
12.	"What Have They Done to Us"	Mako; Grey; Cory Nitta	Mako, Grey	1:59
13.	"Rebel Heart"	Djerv	Djerv	2:51
14.	"The Beast"	Misha Mansoor; Alexander Temple	Misha Mansoor	3:50
15.	"Spin the Wheel"	Mako	Mick Wingert	2:35
16.	"Ma meilleure ennemie"	Stromae; Pomme; Mako; Luc Van Haver	Stromae, Pomme	2:27
17.	"Fantastic"	King Princess; Nick Long; Casey Smith; Tyler Spry; Ryan Tedder	King Princess	3:04
18.	"The Line"	Tyler Joseph	Twenty One Pilots	3:12
19.	"Blood Sweat & Tears"	Mako; Rose Betts; Ester Dean; Tepr; Charlie Trimbur; Woodkid	Sheryl Lee Ralph	3:42
20.	"Come Play"	Young Miko; Tom Morello; Diego Lopez Crespo; Dave Emerson Dahlquist; Ashley Fulton; Kami Kehoe	Stray Kids, Young Miko, Tom Morello	2:41
21.	"Wasteland"	Royal & the Serpent; Mako; Simon Wilcox	Royal & the Serpent	2:41
22.	"Enemy (Opening Title Version)"	Imagine Dragons; JID; Justin Tranter; Mattman & Robin	Imagine Dragons, JID	3:06
Total length:				62:56

Extended edition
No.	Title	Writer(s)	Artist(s)	Length
23.	"What Have They Done to Us" (remix)	Mako; Grey; Cory Nitta; Sasha Alex Sloan	Mako, Grey, Sasha Alex Sloan	3:20
24.	"Fantastic" (demo version)	King Princess; Nick Long; Casey Smith; Tyler Spry; Ryan Tedder	King Princess	2:30
25.	"Ma meilleure ennemie" (featuring Coldplay)	Stromae; Pomme; Mako; Luc Van Haver	Stromae, Pomme, Coldplay, Elyanna	3:21
26.	"Come Play" (Kordhell remix)	Young Miko; Tom Morello; Diego Lopez Crespo; Dave Emerson Dahlquist; Ashley Fulton; Kami Kehoe	Stray Kids, Morello, Kordhell, Young Miko	2:10
27.	"Paint the Town Blue" (Bloodpop remix)	Ashnikko; Slinger	Bloodpop featuring Ashnikko	1:53
28.	"I Can't Hear It Now" (live from Vevo)	Mako	Freya Ridings	2:40
29.	"Fantastic" (live from Vevo)	King Princess; Nick Long; Casey Smith; Tyler Spry; Ryan Tedder	King Princess	3:07
30.	"Wasteland" (live from Vevo)	Mako	Royal & the Serpent	2:37
31.	"Worlds Collide" (inspired by Arcane: League of Legends)	Jvke; Mako	Jvke	3:02
Total length:				85:59

=== Reception ===
Reviewing the soundtrack for the music database AllMusic, Matt Collar gave it 4 out of 5 stars, writing, "Arcane League of Legends: Season 2 soundtrack nicely captures the visceral emotion and drama at the core of the show."

=== Charts ===
==== Weekly charts ====
Weekly chart performance for Arcane League of Legends: Season 2
Chart (2024–2025)	Peak position
Australian Albums (ARIA)	9
Austrian Albums (Ö3 Austria)	18
Belgian Albums (Ultratop Flanders)	19
Belgian Albums (Ultratop Wallonia)	4
Canadian Albums (Billboard)	7
Croatian International Albums (HDU)	22
Danish Albums (Hitlisten)	17
Dutch Albums (Album Top 100)	18
Finnish Albums (Suomen virallinen lista)	18
French Albums (SNEP)	2
German Albums (Offizielle Top 100)	22
Hungarian Albums (MAHASZ)	4
Italian Albums (FIMI)	26
Lithuanian Albums (AGATA)	5
New Zealand Albums (RMNZ)	6
Norwegian Albums (VG-lista)	6
Portuguese Albums (AFP)	7
Spanish Albums (Promusicae)	12
Swedish Albums (Sverigetopplistan)	46
Swiss Albums (Schweizer Hitparade)	5
UK Compilation Albums (OCC)	2
UK Soundtrack Albums (OCC)	2
US Billboard 200	24
US Independent Albums (Billboard)	2
US Top Soundtracks (Billboard)	2

==== Year-end charts ====
Year-end chart performance for Arcane League of Legends: Season Two
Chart (2025)	Position
Belgian Albums (Ultratop Flanders)	141
Belgian Albums (Ultratop Wallonia)	72
French Albums (SNEP)	26
New Zealand Albums (RMNZ)	44
Swiss Albums (Schweizer Hitparade)	82
US Top Soundtracks (Billboard)	5

=== Certifications ===
Certifications for Arcane League of Legends: Season 2
Region	Certification	Certified units/sales
France (SNEP)	Platinum	100,000^{‡}
United Kingdom (BPI)	Gold	100,000^{‡}
^{‡} Sales+streaming figures based on certification alone.

== Original score ==
The original score for the second season was released in three acts, each covering three episodes and debuting the day after its premiere. Act 1 was released on November 10, 2024, followed by Act 2 on November 17 and Act 3 on November 24, respectively.

Arcane League of Legends: Season 2 (Act 1) [Original Score]
No.	Title	Length
1.	"Surveying the Damage / The Transfusion" (featuring Kelci Hahn)	2:18
2.	"Two to One"	3:08
3.	"It's Your Legacy Now"	4:11
4.	"It's Keeping Him Alive"	2:14
5.	"Caitlyn's Hideaway" (featuring Kelci Hahn)	2:33
6.	"Eulogy"	2:48
7.	"The Memorial Assault (Pt. I)"	3:59
8.	"The Memorial Assault (Pt. II)"	3:15
9.	"The Burden of Responsibility"	1:35
10.	"Have You Had Enough?" (featuring Ray Chen)	1:41
11.	"Make the Numbers Work / Into the Gray"	2:16
12.	"Petty Squabbles"	1:41
13.	"Watch It All Burn"	1:52
14.	"Awakening"	3:49
15.	"The Brambleback Has Left the Jungle!"	1:04
16.	"Tea"	0:59
17.	"Footsteps"	1:16
18.	"The Arcade Infiltration"	3:32
19.	"Smeech and Baby Blue"	1:54
20.	"The Healer"	2:01
21.	"An End to Suffering" (featuring Kelci Hahn)	1:31
22.	"Settling a Debt"	2:00
23.	"The Kiss"	0:50
24.	"The Coronation" (featuring Kelci Hahn)	2:20
25.	"Into the Sewers (Pt. I)"	0:49
26.	"A Property of the Arcane"	0:57
27.	"All the More Dangerous"	0:46
28.	"Into the Sewers (Pt. II)"	2:09
29.	"Finally Got the Name Right"	1:35
30.	"Take the Shot"	0:31
31.	"It Had to Be You"	0:53
32.	"Wind Tunnel"	0:53
33.	"Fireworks"	1:07
34.	"Separation"	0:39
35.	"Piltover Stained"	1:38
36.	"Appointment of a General"	2:33
37.	"Singed and the Reconstruction"	0:52
Total length:		70:09

Arcane League of Legends: Season 2 (Act 2) [Original Score]
No.	Title	Length
1.	"The Experiment"	2:10
2.	"You're Our Leader"	1:46
3.	"The Blade Cuts Both Ways"	2:17
4.	"Me, a Hero?"	1:27
5.	"Remembrance"	1:39
6.	"Sevika's Speech"	1:37
7.	"Suppression"	1:28
8.	"The Voices Return"	0:48
9.	"We Won't Be Staying Long"	0:35
10.	"The Fun Option"	0:55
11.	"Undercover"	0:37
12.	"The Incarceration"	1:40
13.	"Unlocked"	1:02
14.	"The Liberator"	2:08
15.	"Reunion"	0:29
16.	"He Needs Our Help"	1:19
17.	"No One in Power is Innocent"	2:20
18.	"Mel's Nightmare"	1:13
19.	"The Oculorum"	2:22
20.	"Not Even Toxic"	2:19
21.	"He's Your Father Too"	1:35
22.	"Victim of Great Tragedy"	2:12
23.	"Some Sort of Puzzle"	2:09
24.	"Inventor of Shimmer"	3:00
25.	"To Know the Truth" (featuring Ray Chen)	2:21
26.	"Blisters and Bedrock"	2:11
27.	"That's Not Vander"	1:33
28.	"Breakthroughs" (featuring Ray Chen)	1:58
29.	"I Can't Let You Leave"	1:45
30.	"Exquisite Chaos"	1:54
31.	"Charting a Course"	0:49
32.	"The Truth of Combat"	0:45
33.	"The Herald's Vision" (featuring Kelci Hahn)	1:29
34.	"Underground Utopia"	0:40
35.	"Noxus at the Gates"	1:19
36.	"Knowledge is a Paradox"	3:06
37.	"Don't Sugarcoat It, Cupcake"	1:28
38.	"So Much for Happy Reunions"	1:23
39.	"Too Many Complications"	1:20
40.	"A Big Distraction"	1:20
41.	"Path to the Herald" (featuring Kelci Hahn)	2:12
42.	"A Deep Cut"	0:41
43.	"Vow" (featuring Ray Chen)	1:04
44.	"Agony"	1:44
Total length:		70:08

Arcane League of Legends: Season 2 (Act 3) [Original Score]
No.	Title	Length
1.	"Open Your Eyes" (featuring Alex Seaver)	2:48
2.	"Desolation"	2:09
3.	"Turn Your Back and I'll Disappear" (featuring Alex Seaver)	2:02
4.	"The Fall"	0:47
5.	"Paranoia"	2:00
6.	"Catharsis"	1:57
7.	"Into the Storm"	0:43
8.	"Collaboration"	1:44
9.	"Climbing the Tower"	0:43
10.	"A Big Upgrade"	1:06
11.	"Tell Me There's a Chance"	1:03
12.	"The Only Way"	1:00
13.	"Goodbye, Friend"	0:51
14.	"A Keepsake"	1:52
15.	"Breaking Free"	0:45
16.	"Welcome to Your Future"	3:42
17.	"A Warrior's Death"	1:17
18.	"We Are One"	1:38
19.	"You Can't Blame Yourself"	1:54
20.	"A Second Chance"	0:53
21.	"No Happy Endings"	1:43
22.	"A Moment of Civility"	1:27
23.	"Judgement" (featuring Kelci Hahn)	2:03
24.	"Respite"	0:46
25.	"Break the Cycle"	2:52
26.	"You Will Never Be a Passenger"	1:26
27.	"A Storm is Coming"	3:13
28.	"I've Found Another Way / The Echo"	3:20
29.	"The War Council"	1:19
30.	"The Noxian Drums"	0:49
31.	"Reload"	1:36
32.	"A Bigger Foe"	1:17
33.	"Desperate Measures"	2:30
34.	"Raised by Wolves"	1:22
35.	"Betrayal"	0:55
36.	"Where's Viktor?"	0:24
37.	"The Price of Ambition"	3:12
38.	"Choice is False" (featuring Kelci Hahn)	0:33
39.	"You've Fought Well"	1:22
40.	"Quite a Thorn"	1:09
41.	"You Are the Wolf / Worlds Apart"	2:16
42.	"Gravity Field"	0:35
43.	"The Ascent"	0:53
44.	"Order and Chaos"	1:08
45.	"Humanity's Self-Corrupting Contradiction"	1:07
46.	"The Challenger"	1:26
47.	"I Promised You" (featuring Ray Chen)	3:21
48.	"Funeral" (featuring Andrew Kierszenbaum)	2:26
49.	"The Bridge (Reprise)" (featuring Ray Chen and Kelci Hahn)	1:05
Total length:		75:09
