= Remember Me (D4vd song) =

Single by D4vd

from the album Arcane League of Legends: Season 2
- Released: 2024
- Length: 2:03
- Label: Riot Games; UMG; Virgin
- Producers: Jack Hallenbeck; Scott James; Silent$ky; Noah Ehler; Gray Toomey

D4vd singles chronology
"I'd Rather Pretend" (2024)	"Remember Me" (2024)	"Where'd It Go Wrong?" (2024)

Music video
- "Remember Me" on YouTube

"Remember Me" is a single by American singer-songwriter D4vd, released in 2024, through Riot Games and Virgin Music Group as the fourth single from Arcane League of Legends: Season 2 (2024). The song, written by D4vd and producers, peaked at number twelve on the New Zealand Hot Singles chart and number twenty-nine on the UK Physical Singles chart. The song was delisted from streaming services by Riot Games in May 2026, after D4vd was charged with the killing of Celeste Rivas Hernandez.

== Background ==
The song portrays the desire to be remembered. It was created for Netflix's soundtrack of Arcane Season 2 and is the eighth track. The music video is inspired by Riot Games' League of Legends.

== Reception ==
Ali Shutler of NME says that the song converts piano-driven emo into a "quivering chunk" of R&B-inspired pop.

== Charts ==
Weekly chart performance for "Remember Me"
Chart (2024)	Peak position
New Zealand Hot Singles (RMNZ)	12
UK Physical Singles (OCC)	29
UK Vinyl Singles (OCC)	24

== Personnel ==
Credits adapted from Apple Music.

- Silent$ky – producer, songwriter
- Joe LaPorta – mastering engineer
- David Burke – vocals, songwriter
- Scott James – producer, songwriter
