= Bryant Barnes =

American singer-songwriter (born 2003)

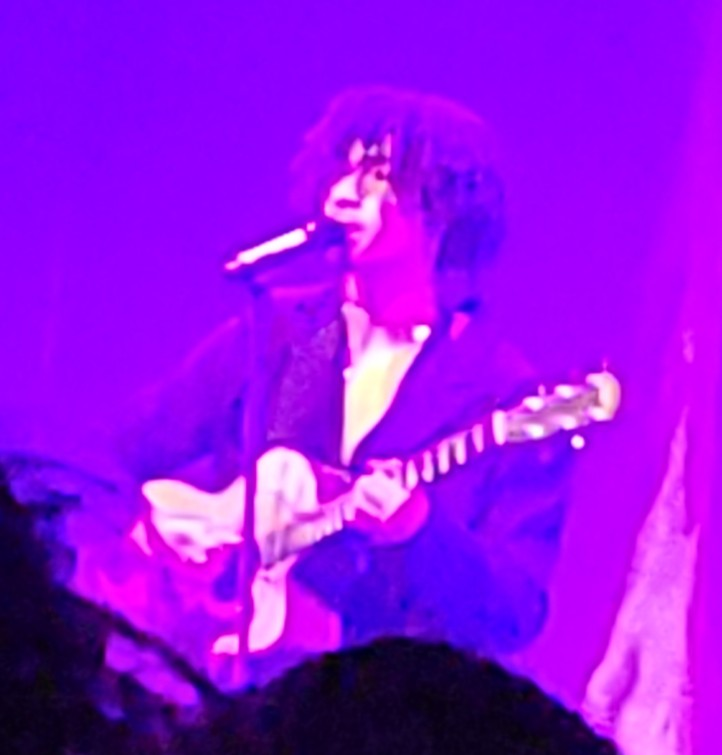
- Barnes at the M Telus in 2025

Background information
- Born: March 13, 2003 (age 23); Cypress, Texas
- Genres: Contemporary R&B; lo-fi; soul
- Occupations: Singer; songwriter; musician
- Years active: 2023–present
- Label: Mercury
- Website: www.bryantbarnesmusic.com

Bryant Barnes (born March 13, 2003), is an American singer-songwriter and musician. He originally gained virality on TikTok through piano covers, but later signed with Mercury Records and began to put out R&B music. He released his first extended play, Vanity in 2024. It contained the hit song "I'd Rather Pretend", which was later made into a remix featuring d4vd. His debut studio album, Solace, was released on October 17, 2025.

== Early life ==
Bryant Barnes was born on March 13, 2003, in Cypress, Texas. His older brother named him after Kobe Bryant. He frequently moved back and forth between Cypress and Tacoma, Washington, as a child. Before pursuing singing, Barnes mainly was a classical pianist, first learning at the age of six. He also learned how to play the cello in middle school. Barnes originally wanted to be a basketball player, but he tore his ACL twice, making him turn to music, and start rapping for fun.

== Career ==
During the COVID-19 pandemic, Barnes uploaded covers of songs by artists such as Mac Miller and Joji to TikTok and played public pianos. He signed with Mercury Records in 2023 after the label noticed his cover of "Carry On" by XXXTentacion. Barnes released his first extended play, Vanity, on July 26, 2024. The song "I'd Rather Pretend" from the album went viral, reaching #7 on the Billboard Hot R&B Songs chart, and spawned a remix with d4vd. Barnes accompanied 070 Shake as a supporting act for her The Petrichor Tour and d4vd on his Withered Tour, both in 2025.

== Influences and artistry ==
Barnes' music is of the contemporary R&B, lo-fi, and soul genres. He has stated that he is influenced by his favorite artists, which are Ekkstacy, Joji, XXXTentacion, Keshi, and Isaia Huron.

== Discography ==
=== Studio albums ===
Title	Album details
Solace	Released: October 17, 2025; Label: Mercury; Formats: LP, CD, digital download, streaming

=== Extended Plays ===
Title	Details	Peak chart positions
Title	Details	US Heat
Vanity	Released: July 26, 2024; Label: Mercury; Formats: Digital download, streaming	13

=== Singles ===
Title	Year	Album
"Adore You"	2023	Vanity
"Losing You"	2023	Non-album single
"Don't Want a Love Song"	2024	Vanity
"Give Me a Sign"	2024	Vanity
"I'd Rather Pretend" (with d4vd)	2024	Non-album singles
"Is This Love to You"	2024	Non-album singles
"Why Can't You"	2025	Non-album singles
"Heaven" (with Avenoir)	2025	Non-album singles
"Two Sides Of Goodbye"	2025	Solace
"Priceless"	2025	Solace
"My Everything"	2025	Solace
"Apollo"	2026	Non-album single

== Tours ==
=== Tours ===
- Solace Tour (2026)

=== Supporting ===
- The Petrichor Tour (070 Shake) (2025)
- Withered Tour (d4vd)
