= I'd Rather Pretend =

- Remix cover art

Single by Bryant Barnes (solo or with D4vd)

from the album Solace and the EP Vanity
- Released: July 26, 2024
- Label: Mercury
- Songwriters: Bryant Barnes; Calle Lehmann; Kris Eriksson; David Burke; Jackson Monroe
- Producer: Andrew Luce

Bryant Barnes singles chronology
| "Give Me A Sign" (2024) | "I'd Rather Pretend" (2024) | "Is This Love To You" (2024) |

D4vd singles chronology
| "There Goes My Baby" (2024) | "I'd Rather Pretend (Remix)" (2024) | "Remember Me" (2024) |

Music video
- "I'd Rather Pretend" on YouTube

"I'd Rather Pretend" is a song by Bryant Barnes originally released as the fourth track from his debut extended play, Vanity (2024) and then the twelfth track to his debut studio album, Solace (2025). The song went viral on TikTok and was later released as a remix featuring D4vd 2 months after the original song.

== Charts ==
Chart performance for "I'd Rather Pretend"
| Chart (2024) | Peak position |
|---|---|
| New Zealand Hot Singles (RMNZ) | 19 |

== Certifications ==
Certifications for "I'd Rather Pretend"
| Region | Certification | Certified units/sales |
|---|---|---|
| Brazil (Pro-Música Brasil) | Platinum | 40,000^{‡} |
^{‡} Sales+streaming figures based on certification alone.
