= One More Dance (D4vd song) =

2025 single by D4vd

Single by D4vd

from the album Withered
- Released: February 7, 2025
- Length: 2:24
- Label: Darkroom; Interscope
- Songwriters: David Burke; Tyler Spry
- Producers: Tyler Spry; Harry Charles

D4vd singles chronology
"Where'd It Go Wrong?" (2024)	"One More Dance" (2025)	"Crashing" (2025)

Music video
- "One More Dance" on YouTube

"One More Dance" is a song by American singer-songwriter D4vd. It was released on February 7, 2025, as the second single from his debut studio album, Withered, under Darkroom and Interscope Records.

== Background ==
The song revolves around a theme of romance and expresses a longing to be with that one person one more time. It was written by Ryan Tedder and produced by Harry Charles and Tyler Spry. The track includes tranquil strings, electronic textures, enchanting vocals, and a romantic ambiance.

== Critical reception ==
Ali Shutler of NME called it "beautiful" and "thoughtful". Joanna Rose of The Honey POP claimed that the song was "delicate" and says it has cinematic qualities.

== Music video ==
The official music video was shot by Cody LaPlant. It depicts a person being stuffed into a car trunk, which drew comment after D4vd (real name David Burke) was charged with the circa April 2025 killing of Celeste Rivas Hernandez, whose dismembered body was discovered in the front trunk of an impounded car registered to Burke.

== Personnel ==
- Tyler Spry – recording engineer, producer, programming engineer, composer, lyricist
- David Burke – vocals, recording engineer
- Eli Heisler – additional mixing engineer
- Alex Meyers – A&R
- Matt Morris – A&R
- Rob Kinelski – mixing engineer
- Dave Kutch – mastering engineer
- Thomas Wolseley – recording engineer
