= Feel It (D4vd song) =

Single by D4vd

from the album Invincible (Season 2 Soundtrack)
- Released: March 28, 2024
- Genre: Funk
- Length: 2:37
- Label: Darkroom; Interscope
- Songwriters: David Burke; Gray Toomey; Noah Ehler; Sam Homaee
- Producers: Gray Toomey; Noah Ehler; Sam Homaee

D4vd singles chronology
"My House Is Not a Home" (2024)	"Feel It" (2024)	"There Goes My Baby" (2024)

Music video
- "Feel It" on YouTube

"Feel It" is a song by American singer-songwriter David Burke, known professionally as D4vd, featured on the soundtrack of Amazon Prime Video's television series Invincible. Released on March 28, 2024, through Darkroom and Interscope Records, the funk track was later included on his debut album, Withered (2025). The song expresses D4vd's certainty that his love interest is the right one for him.

== Production and composition ==
D4vd, a fan of the television series Invincible, collaborated with the show's music supervisor, Gabe Hilfer, to write "Feel It" for the soundtrack. They aimed to create a song that would fit seamlessly into a scene featuring characters Mark Grayson and Amber Bennett, making it feel "more natural" as if the characters were listening to the song in the show.

"Feel It" is a funk track featuring a "heavy bass line" and "notable guitar riffs". Described as a "groovy and upbeat tune" by Uproxx, the song's lyrics focus on D4vd's desire to be with a woman he does not want to lose.

== Music video ==
The music video premiered on 17th of May 2024 on YouTube and was directed by Nick Walker. It begins with David trimming his hair with an electric clipper while using the driver's window of a Dodge car as a mirror. Suddenly, a man in plaid (played by John Tieng) gives chase with him. They both enter a train, and David hides by pretending to read a newspaper while sitting. However, he is still recognized by the man, and they both brawl inside the train. As they get off to a station, the sequence abruptly shifts into a slapstick-style comedy: They both obtain baguettes from a trash bin and used them as if they're bladed weapons, and David makes a gain after smashing the man's face into three different cakes on a bench at the station and puts a bucket on his head. Now in the kitchen of a random house, David throws a small yellow container to the man, and the man throws back fruits from a fruit basket to David. David traps the man with the door of a refrigerator and escapes to the living room. Coming out from hiding, David hits the man's head, and the man throws a pizza box to David's feet, causing him to fall. After the man throws flowers from a vase to David, they both kick and knock each other out. The video ends with a blurry shot of David with the song's title "Feel It" (Note: Written in all caps.) displayed on screen accompanied with a smaller text below reading "Directed by Nick Walker", while the petals of the thrown flowers appear to be blackening rapidly.

Because the song is made in collaboration with the animated series of Invincible, the music video contains references both to the animated and the original comic book series: The newspaper that David uses to hide with has a headline that reads, "Invincible, Friend or Foe?" while David's father, Dawud, (Note: Incorrectly credited in the YouTube video description as Duwad.) makes a cameo where he reads Invincible Compendium One (Note: Also referred to as Invincible Compenium, Volume One or Invincible Compendium Volume One.) inside the train, which David grabs and tries to hit John with as they act their fight. The train station has a poster for the second season of the animation series, which shares similar art style with the song's album art. Near the end of the video, John inaudibly says "Think, D4vd, think", (Note: Subtitle is stylized in all lowercase.) referencing Omni-Man's words "Think, Mark! Think!!", (Note: Dialogue appears on the 17th page of issue #12 (page 283 of Invincible Compendium One). In the animated series' eighth episode of the first season, he simply said "Think, Mark!" instead.) which became an Internet meme.

== Personnel ==
- David Burke (D4vd) – vocals, songwriting
- Gray Toomey – songwriting, production
- Noah Ehler – songwriting, production
- Sam Homaee – songwriting, production
- Jeff Ellis – mixing engineer, mastering engineer
- Ivan Handwerk – assistant mixing engineer
- Trevor Taylor – assistant mixing engineer

== Charts ==
Chart performance for "Feel It"
Chart (2024–2025)	Peak position
Australia (ARIA)	64
Canada (Canadian Hot 100)	65
Global 200 (Billboard)	87
Ireland (IRMA)	47
New Zealand Hot Singles (RMNZ)	12
UK Singles (OCC)	49
US Billboard Hot 100	75
US Hot Rock & Alternative Songs (Billboard)	11
US Pop Airplay (Billboard)	37

== Certifications ==
Certifications for "Feel It"
Region	Certification	Certified units/sales
Brazil (Pro-Música Brasil)	Diamond	160,000^{‡}
Canada (Music Canada)	Platinum	80,000^{‡}
New Zealand (RMNZ)	Platinum	30,000^{‡}
United Kingdom (BPI)	Gold	400,000^{‡}
United States (RIAA)	Gold	500,000^{‡}
Streaming
Central America (CFC)	Gold	3,500,000^{†}
^{‡} Sales+streaming figures based on certification alone.^{†} Streaming-only figures based on certification alone.
