= What Are You Waiting For? (D4vd song) =

2025 single by D4vd

Single by D4vd

from the album Withered
- Released: March 28, 2025
- Genre: Pop; pop rock
- Length: 2:24
- Label: Darkroom; Interscope
- Songwriter: D4vd
- Producer: Tyler Spry

D4vd singles chronology
"Crashing" (2025)	"What Are You Waiting For?" (2025)	"Is This Really Love?" (2025)

Music video
- "What Are You Waiting For?" on YouTube

"What Are You Waiting For?" is a song by American singer-songwriter D4vd. It was released on March 28, 2025, as the fourth single from his debut studio album, Withered, under Darkroom and Interscope Records.

== Background ==
The official music video for the song features streamers Pokimane and JasonTheWeen and was released after the song. The song was released on D4vd's 20th birthday. After D4vd's involvement in the killing of Celeste Rivas Hernandez became publicized, the song was pulled from the soundtrack of Madden NFL 26. The music video was filmed in real-time on the streaming platform Twitch.

== Critical reception ==
Aaron Williams of Uproxx described it as an "optimistic" pop-rock anthem.

== Personnel ==
- Tyler Spry – recording engineer, producer, programming engineer, composer lyricist
- David Burke – recording engineer
- Eli Heisler – additional mixing engineer
- Thomas Wolseley – recording engineer

== Charts ==
Chart performance for "What Are You Waiting For?"
Chart (2025)	Peak position
New Zealand Hot Singles (RMNZ)	16
