= Crashing (D4vd and Kali Uchis song) =

2025 single by D4vd and Kali Uchis

Single by D4vd and Kali Uchis

from the album Withered
- Released: February 28, 2025
- Length: 3:07
- Label: Darkroom; Interscope
- Songwriters: Karly Loaiza; David Burke
- Producers: Velvet; Tyler Spry

D4vd singles chronology
"One More Dance" (2025)	"Crashing" (2025)	"What Are You Waiting For" (2025)

Kali Uchis singles chronology
"Never Be Yours" (2024)	"Crashing" (2025)	"Sunshine & Rain..." (2025)

"Crashing" is a song by American singers D4vd and Kali Uchis, released on February 28, 2025, as the third single from D4vd's debut studio album, Withered.

The music video was directed by Kenneth Cappello and released simultaneously with the song. It was written by D4vd and Kali Uchis alongside producers Velvet and Tyler Spry. The ballad delves into themes of romance.

In September 2025, Uchis removed the song from streaming services after the remains of 14-year-old Celeste Rivas Hernandez were discovered in a Tesla registered to D4vd.

== Background and composition ==
The music video for "Crashing" was directed by Kenneth Cappello and released alongside the song. The track features Kali Uchis, who joined after connecting on Instagram live. D4vd released a teaser for the song and confirmed the collaboration with Kali Uchis on February 25 through Instagram posts.

On September 17, Uchis announced her efforts to remove the song from streaming services following the discovery of human remains of a 14-year-old girl, Celeste Rivas Hernandez, in a Tesla registered to D4vd.

== Charts ==
Chart performance for "Crashing"
Chart (2025)	Peak position
New Zealand Hot Singles (RMNZ)	11
US Hot Rock & Alternative Songs (Billboard)	16

== Release history ==
Release formats for "Crashing"
Region	Date	Format	Label	Ref.
Various	February 28, 2025	Digital download; streaming	Darkroom; Interscope	
