= Killing of Celeste Rivas Hernandez =

2025 child homicide in California, US

- Undated photograph of Rivas
- Location: Hollywood Hills West, Los Angeles, California, U.S.
- Date: c. April 23, 2025; 10:10 – 10:31 p.m. (PDT; UTC−07:00)
- Attack type: Child homicide
- Weapons: "Sharp instrument" (killing); Chainsaw (dismemberment)
- Victims: Celeste Rivas Hernandez, (aged 14)
- Motive: To prevent victim from releasing career-damaging information (alleged)
- Accused: David Anthony Burke, known professionally as D4vd

On September 8, 2025, the remains of 14-year-old Celeste Abigail Rivas Hernandez (September 7, 2010 – c. April 23, 2025) were discovered in Hollywood, Los Angeles, California, inside the front trunk of an impounded Tesla Model X registered to David Burke, a musician known professionally as D4vd. (Note: Pronounced "David". Burke's stage name is stylized in all-lowercase on streaming services, as "d4vd". Some secondary sources capitalize the first letter, while others do not.) In April 2026, Burke was arrested and charged with first-degree murder, continuous sexual abuse of a child under 14 years of age, and unlawful mutilation of human remains.

== Background ==
=== Celeste Rivas Hernandez ===
Celeste Abigail Rivas Hernandez was a 14-year-old (Note: While Rivas's body was found one day after her 15th birthday, decomposition suggested she had died several months before turning 15.) girl from Lake Elsinore, California. Born to parents who immigrated from El Salvador, Rivas had two older siblings and attended Lakeland Village School. Her parents contacted the Riverside County Sheriff's Department three times in early 2024 to report her missing: on February 15, March 19, and April 5. It is unclear when Rivas returned home afterward, but neighbors said they spotted her in the neighborhood with her parents later in the year.

=== David Burke (D4vd) ===
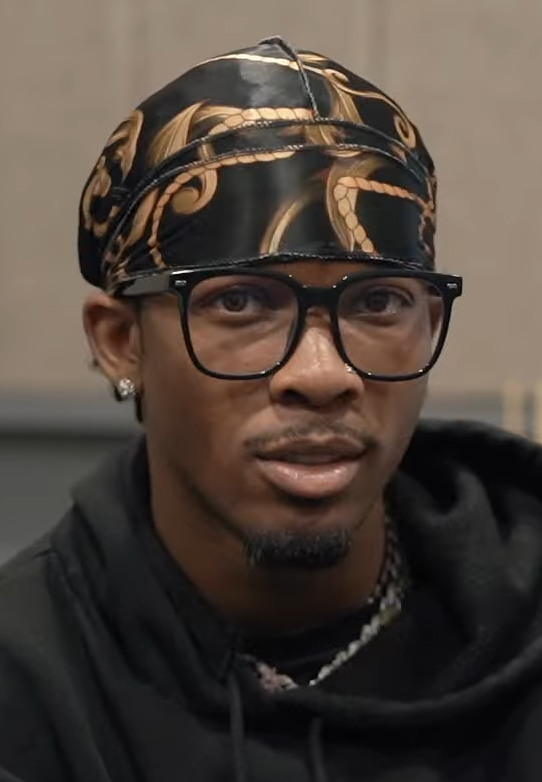
Burke in 2025

David Anthony Burke, professionally known as D4vd, is an American singer-songwriter. Best known for his songs "Romantic Homicide" and "Here with Me", his music often explores themes of love, heartbreak, and relationship struggles. Burke released his debut studio album Withered on April 25, 2025, and embarked on a world tour months later on August 5, with performances planned across North America and Europe.

== Evidence ==
=== Relationship between Rivas and Burke ===
According to prosecutors, Rivas and Burke first met in January 2022 when she was 11 years old. They began a sexual relationship in November 2023 when Rivas was 13 years old and Burke was 18 years old. Over the following year, Rivas spent "significant time" with Burke, including summer weekends at his home and trips to Las Vegas, London, and Texas, where she met his family. Rivas and Burke had matching "Shhh..." tattoos on their right index fingers, and they had each other's first names tattooed on their left ring fingers. According to text messages between Rivas and Burke, Rivas became pregnant and had an abortion in January 2024.

After Rivas was reported missing on February 15, 2024, the Riverside County Sheriff's Department identified Burke's phone number in Rivas's phone records. When they contacted him on February 17, Burke said he last spoke with her on February 13 or 14, and stated he was unaware she was a minor or that she had been reported missing. Later that day, Riverside County authorities requested a welfare check by the Los Angeles County Sheriff's Department at Burke's home in West Hollywood. Burke told deputies that he had only met Rivas once in person, in November 2023, and showed them a yearbook photo of her on his cellphone. Rivas returned home two days later. Her parents confiscated her cellphone afterward, but Burke allegedly paid one of her classmates $1,000 to give her a new cellphone that he had purchased so they could stay in contact.

Rivas and Burke ended their relationship in November 2024, but they continued to communicate and have sexual relations. Rivas sent Burke a text message in March 2025, stating "All we do is have sex and just hang out man I want more than that for myself". On April 22, 2025, they had a "lengthy argument" through text messages, where Rivas confronted Burke about his relationships with other women, as Burke had led her to believe that they had a future together, and she threatened to make their relationship public to damage his career and image.

==== "Celeste" ====
An unreleased demo recorded by Burke, titled "Celeste", (Note: The song has also been referred to under its full file name "Celeste_Demo unfin".) leaked online on September 17, 2025, shortly after the media had identified the victim as Rivas. The song, exported in December 2023 (Note: Several articles, citing TMZ, claim "Celeste" leaked in December 2023. This misunderstanding appears to stem from the file's metadata, which shows it was exported on December 22, 2023, not when it surfaced online. The song did not leak until September 17, 2025, following Celeste's death, and there is no public record of it appearing earlier.) and nearly four minutes long, includes lyrics such as, "Oh, Celeste / The girl with my name tattooed on her chest / Smell her on my clothes like cigarettes / I hear her voice each time I take a breath / I'm obsessed" and "Oh, Celeste / Afraid you'll only love me when undressed / But you look so damn gorgeous in that dress / Missing you so much makes me depressed". Its alleged connection to Rivas and the circumstances of its circulation have not been independently confirmed.

=== Homicide and aftermath ===
On April 23, 2025, at approximately 8:40 p.m., Burke arranged for an Uber to transport Rivas from her Lake Elsinore home to his Hollywood Hills West residence. Shortly after she arrived, at around 10:10 p.m., Burke allegedly stabbed Rivas multiple times and made no attempt to save her life. They had been exchanging text messages before she arrived, and at 10:31 p.m., Burke messaged her asking where she was. Prosecutors allege this message was part of a premeditated cover-up by Burke, as she did not respond because she was most likely already dead. Her cellphone ceased all activity on this night. At approximately 11:30 p.m., Burke drove to an isolated site off of California State Route 154, near Lake Cachuma in Santa Barbara County, where prosecutors allege that he disposed of evidence. He visited this same location on two later dates, May 8 and May 31. Rivas's U.S. passport card was found at this site on January 17, 2026, by a Caltrans worker.

Burke returned home the following morning, on April 24, before going to a radio interview and attending a release party for his Withered album. That same day, a variety of items began to be purchased under the aliases "Travion Davis" and "Victoria Mendez", and were delivered to Burke's residence. A shovel was purchased from Home Depot and was delivered via Postmates on April 24; two chainsaws from Amazon on May 1; a body bag, heavy-duty laundry bags and a blue inflatable pool from Amazon on May 5; and a "burn cage" (Note: A metal cage, usually a box, used to contain flames similarly to an incinerator.) from Amazon on July 7. Prosecutors believe Rivas's body was placed in the inflatable pool in Burke's garage before being dismembered with a chainsaw. Blood samples that were later collected in the garage matched Rivas's genetic profile, and blue plastic fragments that matched the pool were found in Rivas's body. Her left ring and pinkie fingers were also amputated, the former featuring a tattoo of Burke's name, but they have not been recovered.

Rivas's head and torso were placed into the body bag, and her limbs into a garbage bag, then loaded into the front trunk of Burke's Tesla Model X, where they remained for weeks or even months until they were discovered. Surveillance footage from July 29 alleges Burke to be the last person to drive the vehicle before it was abandoned, as he soon left to embark on his Withered world tour. The vehicle was parked on Bluebird Avenue, near Burke's Hollywood Hills residence. After residents complained about the vehicle, its tires were marked by a parking enforcement officer on August 27, and it was ticketed on September 3 for violating the 72-hour parking ordinance. Two days later, it was impounded and transported to a tow yard in Hollywood.

On September 8, 2025, Rivas's heavily decomposed remains were discovered after a tow yard worker called the Los Angeles Police Department (LAPD) to investigate a foul odor emanating from the vehicle. An LAPD captain told KABC-TV the body was at least partially dismembered but not decapitated. The following day, Burke was reportedly cooperating with authorities, and he performed in Minneapolis as part of his tour. On September 16, the Los Angeles County Medical Examiner identified the body as that of Celeste Rivas Hernandez. Afterward, Rivas's mother told TMZ that her daughter had a boyfriend named "David", but she had not met him. Various pieces of evidence connecting Rivas and Burke began to surface, including photographs of them together, and public interactions they had on Burke's official server on the messaging app Discord dating back to 2022.

=== Autopsy ===
The examination of Rivas's body was performed by a deputy medical examiner on September 10, 2025, at the DME's Forensic Science Center, two days after its discovery. The office determined the official cause of death as "multiple penetrating injuries caused by object(s)" and classified the manner of death as homicide. Sources close to the investigation told news outlets she may have died in the spring of 2025. The report identified two penetrating wounds to the torso with smooth edges consistent with sharp force injuries: one on the right abdomen, approximately 1.5 inches (3.81 cm) deep, perforating the liver, and a second on the left lower chest, at least 2 inches (5.08 cm) deep, penetrating the intercostal spaces and causing disruption to the cortical surfaces of the adjacent ribs. Due to extensive postmortem changes, the autopsy faced significant limitations: Rivas's heavily decomposed body weighed just 71 pounds (32.2 kg) at the time of examination, having remained in the car's front trunk for over four months through the summer heat. The medical examiner noted that her head was "partially skeletonized" and her left eye was absent, while advanced decomposition also prevented examiners from determining her eye color. The autopsy report also noted that the left ring and pinkie fingers appeared to have been mutilated. Multiple fragments of blue plastic material were found embedded in the cut surfaces of the dismembered body. Toxicology performed on liver tissue showed a low level of ethanol, the origin of which—ingestion or postmortem decomposition—could not be determined; initial screening also returned presumptive positives for benzodiazepines and methamphetamine/MDMA, though additional testing returned no confirmed presence of MDMA or methamphetamine, and none of these substances were determined to be a factor in her cause of death. Additionally, superficial abrasions were noted on one of Rivas's hands, though the report did not specify whether they were defensive in nature.

On November 21, 2025, the LAPD obtained a court order to place a security hold on the Los Angeles County Medical Examiner's case file for Rivas, preventing the release of any details, including the cause and manner of death, which the medical examiner legally challenged. The order was granted by Los Angeles Superior Court judge Craig Richman, who sealed the medical examiner's findings, including autopsy results, citing potential risks to the investigation or witnesses. The Medical Examiner's office, led by Chief Medical Examiner Dr. Odey Ukpo, publicly criticized the order, stating that security holds are rare and not proven to improve investigative outcomes. Ukpo noted that the LAPD had previously requested a hold on September 15, which was denied due to insufficient justification. The office reiterated its commitment to transparency but acknowledged it was legally bound to comply with the court order until it is lifted. In a court declaration, LAPD Detective Joshua Byers of the Robbery-Homicide Division argued that releasing autopsy details could reveal investigative strategies, witness identities, or informant information, potentially endangering lives or compromising the case. The Medical Examiner's autopsy report was unsealed on April 22, 2026. Ukpo released a statement upon publication of the report, saying he was "grateful this information can now be released, not only to the public, but also to the grieving family enduring loss."

== Investigation ==
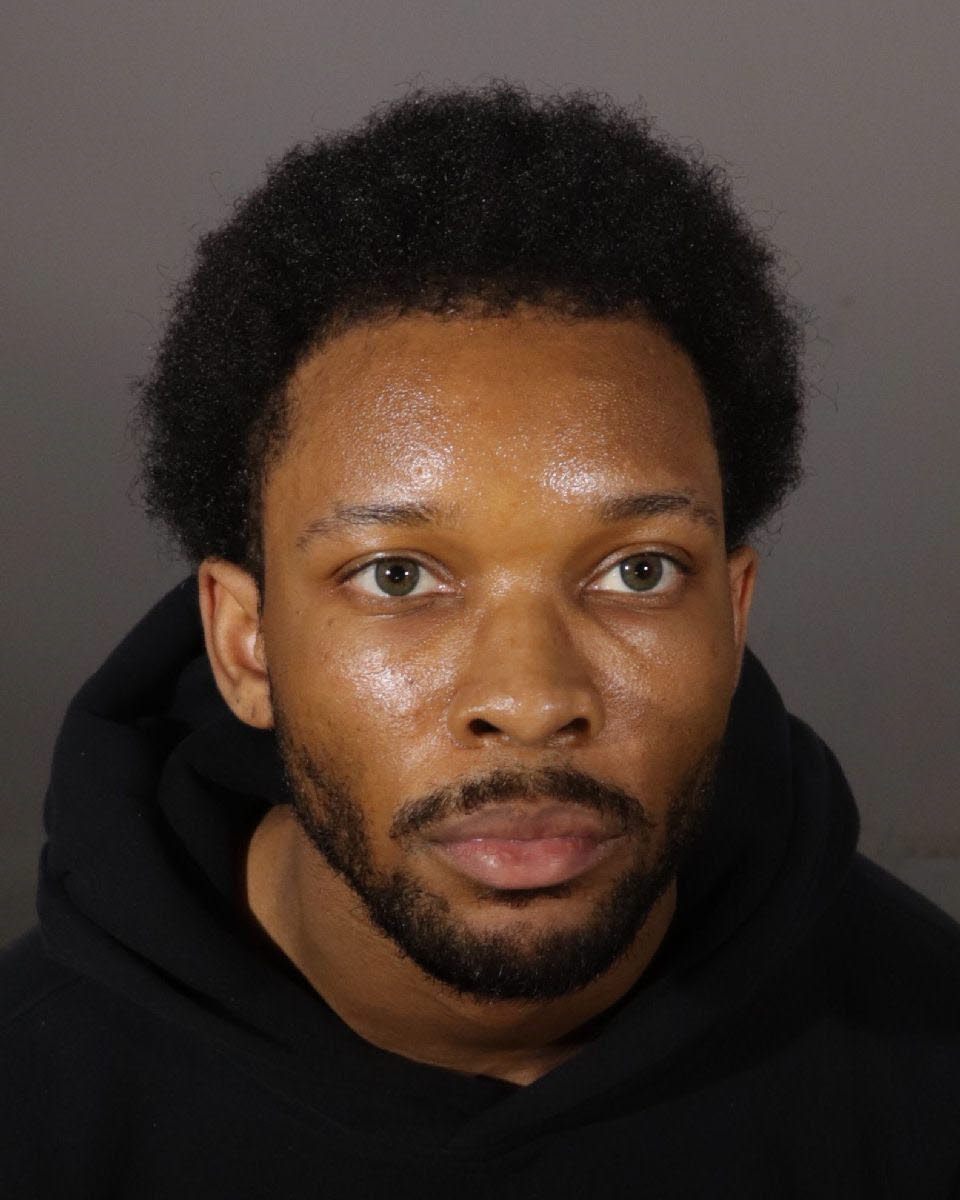
Mugshot of Burke in April 2026

On September 17, 2025, LAPD investigators executed a search warrant at a Hollywood Hills property occupied by Burke and seized electronic devices, including a computer. A private investigator hired by the property owner reported finding a "burn cage" incinerator. Burke's manager terminated the property's lease shortly after the search, and he moved out. Burke retained criminal defense attorney Blair Berk, known for representing celebrities. LAPD Robbery-Homicide captain Scot Williams stated in early October that no suspect had been identified in Rivas's death, citing the undetermined cause of death and uncertainty about criminal culpability beyond concealment of her body. Investigators suspected multiple people were involved in disposing of the body. LAPD investigators were focusing on a trip to Santa Barbara County in spring 2025 by Burke and its potential relationship to the case.

In November 2025, Burke was named a suspect in the investigation. That same month, Rivas's family was considering filing a civil lawsuit against the LAPD to force the release of evidence and records related to the investigation. They mentioned delays in the investigation and a lack of transparency from law enforcement as their reasons. Attorney Neama Rahmani suggested that the family could pursue a civil suit to obtain the withheld information, emphasizing that concealing a body is a crime regardless of the circumstances of the death.

On November 24, the LAPD publicly characterized the case as an "investigation into murder" for the first time, a shift from earlier statements that avoided classifying Rivas's death as a homicide. LAPD Deputy Chief Alan Hamilton stated that "accountability is coming" and assured that detectives were actively pursuing justice for Rivas, emphasizing that "no one is off the table, including Burke." The department also clarified that Rivas's body was neither frozen nor decapitated, addressing widespread misinformation. On November 26, the Los Angeles Times confirmed that an investigative grand jury had been convened over the course of the month to hear evidence regarding possible charges relating to Rivas's death. Executives at Burke's record label were questioned. Live streamer Neo Langston, a friend of Burke, was arrested in January 2026 after failing to appear before the grand jury; he appeared as a witness in February. Burke's parents and brother were subpoenaed to testify before the grand jury in January; they challenged the subpoenas in February, arguing their due process rights were being violated, but were denied.

On April 16, 2026, Burke was arrested by the LAPD at a house on Marmont Avenue on suspicion of the murder of Rivas. On April 20, the LA County District Attorney's Office announced that Burke would be charged with first-degree murder, continuous sexual abuse of a child under the age of 14, and unlawful mutilation of human remains. The case includes special circumstances of murder of a witness, alleging that Rivas was involved in an investigation into lewd and lascivious sexual acts committed by Burke; murder for financial gain, allegedly to protect his music career; and lying in wait, because Rivas went to his home; as well as a special allegation that Burke used a deadly weapon to commit the crime. Prosecutors indicated they will consider seeking the death penalty. The same day, Burke appeared in court for the first time since his arrest, and pleaded not guilty to all charges. Rivas's date of death was listed as "on or about April 23, 2025". Following his arrest, prosecutors reported that they found a "significant amount" of child pornography on Burke's iCloud storage account.

== Trial ==
People v. Burke
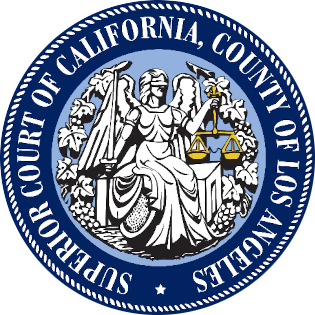
- Court: Superior Court of California for and in the County of Los Angeles
- Full case name: The People of the State of California v. David Anthony Burke
- Submitted: April 20, 2026
- Charge: First-degree murder with special circumstances (murder of a witness, financial gain, lying in wait); Continuous sexual abuse of a child under 14; Unlawful mutilation of human remains

Court membership
- Judges sitting: Theresa McGonigle (arraignment; bail); Charlaine F. Olmedo (preliminary hearing)

The People vs. David Anthony Burke is an upcoming criminal trial of American singer D4vd, for the death, dismemberment, sexual assault, and production of child pornography of Rivas. Deputy District Attorney Beth Silverman of the Major Crimes Division will serve as the lead prosecutor.

Silverman said that the prosecution has amassed "40 terabytes" worth of evidence for the case. Prosecutors filed a brief on April 29, 2026, that outlined evidence collected during the investigation and a timeline on what they believe happened with Rivas. Following a five-day preliminary hearing held in July 2026, the judge ruled that there is sufficient evidence for the case to proceed to trial.

=== Preliminary hearing ===
During the first day of the preliminary hearing, LAPD officers testified that on September 8, 2025, they discovered human remains in a Tesla registered to singer David Anthony Burke, also known as D4vd. Officers were called in due to an extreme odor coming from the car, and detectives of the LAPD's Robbery and Homicide Unit reported to the scene. The remains included a torso and head in a bag located inside the front trunk of the vehicle, in a state of severe decomposition.

Upon looking into the front trunk, detectives discovered a partially unzipped black body bag with a dismembered head and torso and missing extremities. They testified to being able to smell the strong scent of decomposition. Inside the trunk, they also found a black garbage bag which held the extremities. The bags were surrounded by immature and adult insects, and had liquid decomposition coming from them.

Pictures of the scene were presented during the hearing. The officers traced the license plates, which were from Texas, to Burke's Texas home address.

Medical examiners reported seeing blue plastic material in the limbs of the body, photos of which were also presented to court. Photos of the hands showed two missing fingers, reportedly ones which had Burke's name and "Shhh" tattooed on them. The fingers are yet to be recovered.

Detectives testified that after the vehicle was towed to LAPD headquarters, they found a receipt dated July 29, 2025 from Ross. Surveillance tapes from the store showed Burke shopping and interacting with the vehicle. Screenshots of the infotainment system were cross-referenced with iCloud data to further show this occurrence.

During the investigation, Apple was subpoenaed for iCloud information from Burke's device. Reportedly, 6-8 terabytes of information were produced from his iPhone 16 Pro. Detectives used a program called Cellebrite to analyze the data. The last time his phone connected to the car was on July 29, 2025. His phone has yet to be recovered. Surveillance footage from neighbor's cameras showed this was the last time the car was seen being driven before being parked.

Footage also showed Burke exiting the vehicle and walking back to his home at approximately 14:20 PDT on July 29, 2025. Patrol vehicles with automatic license plate detectors also indicated the car never leaving the home. The car remained there until being taken to an impound lot after multiple citations, where the body was later discovered.

Following this testimony, body camera footage was shown in court of officers visiting Burke in search of Hernandez during one of the periods in which she was reported missing.

When asked by the sheriffs when the last time he spoke to her was, he stated they last spoke on February 13, 2024. He stated they met through Facebook, Instagram, and Discord in approximately 2020-2021. Police informed Burke that Hernandez was 13 years old and then proceeded to search the home with Burke's consent; they found no evidence of Hernandez being there. The body camera footage showed in the court room lasted approximately 10.5 minutes and transcripts were provided.

A paper trail of Burke's online purchases, including a body bag, chainsaws, an inflatable pool, and a burn pit, as well as his car's GPS records were presented. His financial manager also testified, including testimony that Burke made anywhere between 10 and 11.5 million dollars during his career thus far, which prosecutors used to argue the financial motive, and special circumstance that could be used to make the offense punishable by death penalty under California law, of the murder.

Messages between Burke and Hernandez were presented during the fourth day of the hearing. On June 19, 2024 Hernandez asked Burke if his mother knew they had sex before, to which Burke responded that she thinks it's the first thing they do when they see each other. Hernandez then told told Burke she can sleep over, but "just don't get me pregnant".

On June 23, 2024, Burke messaged Hernandez to "Rate sex today out of 10", to which Hernandez responded with an emoji (the emojis are unknown as the data the prosecution received didn't allow for the emojis to be replicated and presented). Burke told Hernandez "I need more hickeys", in which Hernandez responded by stating her breasts and "pussy" is sore. Burke responded by telling her to let him know if he is being too rough.

Prosecution linked these messages to 9 photos of CSAM material recovered from information linked to his phone. She was 13 years old at the time. On June 27, 2024 Hernandez messaged Burke stating "WE FUCKED. N IT HUIT. N IT HURT. SMM.". On July 9, 2024 Burke messaged Hernandez telling her that he is thinking about her "abortion gift". She responded with "I want balenciaga hourglass purse" and "u ever just think we have a whole ass sex tape", to which Burke responded with "few of em, yep".

On August 30, 2024, Hernandez and Burke began another conversation. Hernandez expressed that she cared about Burke and that she "killed my kid for you". After further conversation, she expressed that she has to lie to everyone around her and "even my kid" for the rest of her life. She further expressed that "I'd do anything to have it [the child] back".

The prosecution presented messages of them conversing, as well as discussing sex, dated through March 14, 2025. Then, Hernandez would message Burke stating her intentions to move on from him and that they can remain friends. She expressed how she felt the two cannot have a balanced relationship and that all they do "is have sex and hang out".

Up to 8,000-9,000 text messages were presented dated up until the day Hernandez was believed to have been killed. Hernandez messaged Burke once again in 2025 asking Burke to explain to him why he wants to be friends with "Aysia". He explained it was just a friend of his. She accused him of being willing to end their friendship just so he can be friends with Aysia, to which Burke pushed back. She then told him she doesn't want to be friends with him if he stays as friends with Aysia. She later asked then why was she at the house, to which Burke defended it stating it everyone went there to get themselves guest wristbands for Coachella.

Hernandez responded with "Oh my fucking god, I swear to god I will kill you, she was in my seat. I will strangle you and tell my dad so many lies and end your career" and "She posted about being at your house you fucking weirdo".

On April 23, 2025 (the assumptive day of the murder), the two talked about seeing each other, and then Burke proceeded to order her an Uber. Burke texted her asking "are u coming at 9 or is it too late or early for you" to which Hernandez responded with "I told you I can go whenever".

At 8:20 p.m. that night Hernandez messaged Burke to get her the Uber. Burke did and at 8:39, he messaged her that it had arrived. At 10:03, Hernandez messaged Burke, "Girly pop I'm almost there open your door if you're home". Burke replied with "got uu". No records of Hernandez ever messaging Burke again were ever found. At 10:10 Burke texted her that the gate was open and the door was unlocked.

Twenty minutes later at 10:31, Burke messaged her "Uber said you're here, wya". At 10:33 he messaged "helooo". At 10:36 he messaged "bro" and "Celeste". At 10:58 he messaged "bro blocking me?". At 11:36 he messaged "helloo". At 11:37 he messaged "bro" and "ima call you bro your scaring me". At 11:41 he messaged "wtf". At 12:00 midnight he messaged "where are you?" and "please".

The prosecution presented the Uber records stating that the passenger was dropped off at 10:10 that night. They presented evidence that showed his phone was connected to the car at 11:30 p.m. and evidence of the car moving north towards Santa Barbara. Santa Barbara locations were found on the car's infotainment system.

Later during the preliminary hearing sessions, testimony expanded upon forensic evidence, including trace blood evidence being found in his car and garage, as well as other various items. Criminalists also presented evidence that signified a highly likely match of the DNA found to be Hernandez's, a septillion times more likely. The LA coroner found that Hernandez died due to life-threatening stab wounds, and the toxicology report came back negative. Images of Hernandez's body, both how they were found in the car as well as how they appeared reassembled by the medical examiner, were presented.

Following a five-day preliminary hearing, which began on July 21, 2026 and ending on July 27, 2026, in which a Los Angeles County judge found the singer fit to stand trial, Burke was scheduled for an arraignment hearing, scheduled to occur on August 31, 2026. Over 10 witnesses testified, and the LA judge presiding over the case ruled there was probable cause for Burke to be charged with the offenses.

On August 31, 2026, Burke was brought into the Los Angeles County Superior Court for a post-preliminary hearing. Burke announced to the judge that he had dropped his private attorneys and requested representation from the Los Angeles County Public Defender's office. No reason for the decision was given by Burke or his former legal team. He has pleaded not guilty to all charges. A pre-trial hearing was scheduled for October 19.

On October 19th, 2026, a pre-trial hearing took place. Burke appeared rugged and visibly drained in court, and for the first time, he wasn't being represented by his private attorneys, rather he was represented by public defenders, primarily Walid Kandeel. Burke’s next court hearing is scheduled for January 11th, 2027.

== Reactions ==
=== Industry and collaborator reactions ===
Days after the discovery of Rivas's body, the remainder of Burke's Withered World Tour was canceled. His record label, Interscope Records, also halted all promotional activities regarding him, including the release of a deluxe edition for his album Withered, which was set for September 19. Interscope and secondary label Darkroom officially severed ties with Burke later in the year.

In the days following the discovery, American singer-songwriter Kali Uchis pulled the song "Crashing", a collaboration with Burke, from streaming services and denounced him as being "not [her] friend". Icelandic singer-songwriter Laufey would later pull the song "This Is How It Feels" from streaming services. Olympic figure skater Alysa Liu announced she would be changing her routine, which included the Laufey song. Burke's song "What Are You Waiting For" was removed from the soundtrack for Madden NFL 26 without a statement from the publisher, EA Sports. He was also removed from the Spilt Milk 2025 festival lineup. Epic Games issued refunds to players who purchased in-game items featuring Burke's music in their game Fortnite, stating the refunds were the first step in a plan of changes to the items. Musicians Holly Humberstone, Damiano David and the Kid Laroi, as well as Riot Games, have also pulled their collaborations with Burke from digital platforms, (Note: "The Line", a collaboration between Laroi and Burke, was originally kept on streaming platforms while other songs were being taken down, but has been removed as of April 2026: "The First Time by the Kid Laroi on Apple Music". November 10, 2023.) with music conglomerate Universal Music Group helping to facilitate these removals. YouTube demonetized Burke's accounts and TikTok suspended him on their platform.

=== Public and media reactions ===
A vigil for Rivas was held in Lake Elsinore, and her body was released to her family for memorial services. On October 6, 2025, Rivas was buried at Queen of Heaven Cemetery in Rowland Heights, California, following a private funeral service.

The case has garnered significant media attention due to Burke's public persona and the circumstances of Rivas's death. Burke's music, which often explores dark themes such as violence and death, has been scrutinized in light of the investigation. For example, his music video for the 2022 single "Romantic Homicide" features imagery of a bloodied woman and a blindfolded figure, while the video for the 2025 single "One More Dance" depicts a person being stuffed into a car trunk. The LAPD's unusual decision to seek a court-ordered secrecy hold on the medical examiner's report further fueled discussion about transparency and the handling of high-profile cases.

== Public statements ==
=== Family statements ===
Rivas's family has expressed profound grief and devastation over her death, describing her as a beloved daughter, sister, cousin, and friend. In a public statement released shortly after Rivas's body was identified, the family said: "We are heartbroken by the loss of our beloved Celeste. She was a sweet, loving girl who deserved so much more." Her brother Matthew Rivas stated she had been on her way to see a movie with Burke the night she disappeared, and that the family had no knowledge of the extent of her relationship with the singer. Her mother, Mercedes Martinez, told reporters outside the courthouse following Burke's arraignment that she wanted "justice for my daughter" and that she would not rest until everyone responsible was held accountable. Her funeral was held on October 7, 2025, approximately one month after her body was found, with the community of Lake Elsinore turning out in large numbers to pay their respects. The community in Lake Elsinore has shown significant support, with vigils held in her honor. Following Burke's arrest in April 2026, the family issued a statement through their attorney calling the arrest "a first step toward justice" and urging prosecutors to pursue the maximum possible charges. The family has been vocal about their desire for a thorough investigation and accountability for all responsible.

On September 7, 2026, Rivas's family openly advocated for Burke to be sentenced to death. In a public statement, the family stated through their attorney: “If the death penalty were activated, it would be perfect for this kind of human being, devoid of feelings and emptiness inside, and without conscience, who only caused pain to our daughter, our family, and the world that supports our precious daughter...". The family then released their own statement explaning that they were "experiencing so many emotions” and “reliving unforgettable moments even though she is no longer here.”

=== LAPD statements ===
The LAPD's initial public statements in September 2025 were cautious and avoided classifying Rivas's death as a homicide, with LAPD Robbery-Homicide captain Scot Williams stating that no suspect had been identified, citing the undetermined cause of death and uncertainty about criminal culpability beyond concealment of her body. On November 24, 2025, the LAPD publicly classified the case as an "investigation into murder" for the first time, a significant shift from earlier statements. LAPD Deputy Chief Alan Hamilton stated that "accountability is coming" and assured that detectives were actively pursuing justice for Rivas, emphasizing that "no one is off the table, including Burke." The department also clarified that Rivas's body was neither frozen nor decapitated, directly addressing widespread misinformation circulating online at the time. The LAPD confirmed that the car had been parked on Bluebird Avenue since late July 2025, around the time Burke began his national tour, and that evidence suggested Rivas may have died in the spring of 2025, months before the discovery of her remains. Following Burke's arrest on April 16, 2026, the LAPD issued a statement confirming the arrest and thanking the public for their patience during what it described as "one of the most complex investigations in recent memory."

=== Burke's legal counsel and management ===
Burke had retained criminal defense attorney Blair Berk to represent him as the investigation continues. Robert Morgenroth, general manager of Mogul Vision, testified before the grand jury and was questioned about the singer's movements and the handling of the case. Since then, Berk has withdrawn from the case for unknown reasons and a public defender has been appointed for Burke.
