= D4vd =

American singer-songwriter (born 2005)

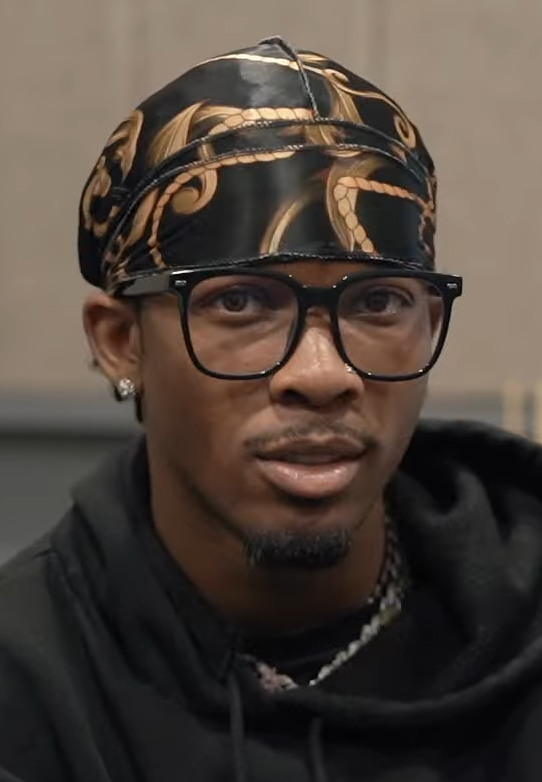
- D4vd in 2025

Background information
- Born: David Anthony Burke; March 28, 2005 (age 21); Queens, New York City, U.S.
- Origin: Houston, Texas, U.S.
- Genres: Lo-fi pop; indie rock; R&B
- Occupation: Singer-songwriter
- Works: Discography
- Years active: 2021–present (hiatus: 2025–present)
- Labels: Darkroom (formerly); Interscope (formerly)
- Publisher: Sony Music Publishing
- Website: d4vd.io

David Anthony Burke (born March 28, 2005), known professionally as D4vd (stylized in all lowercase), (Note: Pronounced "David". Burke's stage name is stylized in all-lowercase on streaming services, as "d4vd". Some secondary sources capitalize the first letter, while others do not.) is an American singer-songwriter. Born in Queens, New York City, and raised in Houston, Texas, Burke began composing music in 2021 for his Fortnite gameplay montages. He first achieved commercial success with his 2022 singles "Romantic Homicide" and "Here with Me", both of which earned multiple platinum certifications. In 2023, he released the EPs Petals to Thorns and The Lost Petals; the former charted in six territories. In 2025, he released his only studio album, Withered, which peaked at number 13 on the US Billboard 200.

In September 2025, police discovered the dismembered body of 14-year-old Celeste Rivas Hernandez inside a vehicle registered to Burke. Following her identification, his ongoing tour and a planned deluxe reissue of Withered were canceled. He was arrested on April 16, 2026, on suspicion of murdering Rivas and is being held without bail. On April 20, Burke was charged with first-degree murder of Rivas with special circumstances, lewd and lascivious acts with an individual under 14, and mutilating a body. He pleaded not guilty to all charges.

== Early life ==
David Anthony Burke was born on March 28, 2005, in Queens, New York City, the son of Colleen and Dawud Burke. His family later moved to Houston, Texas. After seventh grade, he was homeschooled. As a child, he played the piano, sang in a church choir, and listened exclusively to gospel music until age 13. He is a Christian, stating in an interview with Astrophe Magazine, "I get my personal power from God for sure. Heavy believer in the Christian faith."

== Career ==
=== 2021–2022: Early career and rise to prominence ===
Burke began his music career by uploading Fortnite gaming montages. To avoid copyright issues, he started creating original music that blended lo-fi pop, R&B, and indie rock. He released his music to SoundCloud, including songs such as "You and I", "Take Me to the Sun", and "Runaway". He chose the stage name "d4vd" partly to improve his search engine optimization. He released the single "Romantic Homicide" on July 20, 2022, following TikTok snippets of it going viral.

"Romantic Homicide" charted at No. 3 on the Hot Alternative Songs chart and appeared at No. 33 on the Billboard Hot 100 chart, marking his first entry on the chart. The music video, inspired by film noir, was nominated for Music Video (Independent) during the 14th Hollywood Music in Media Awards. After observing others reuse his music, he decided to keep making songs.

The song's success prompted Darkroom and Interscope Records to sign Burke in September 2022. First released on SoundCloud before "Romantic Homicide", Burke's next single, "Here with Me", was released to streaming platforms in September 2022. The song entered multiple charts after gaining traction on TikTok, most notably at No. 60 on the US Billboard Hot 100, and reached the top ten in Singapore. Most of these songs were produced using a freemium DAW called BandLab.

=== 2023–2024: Extended plays ===
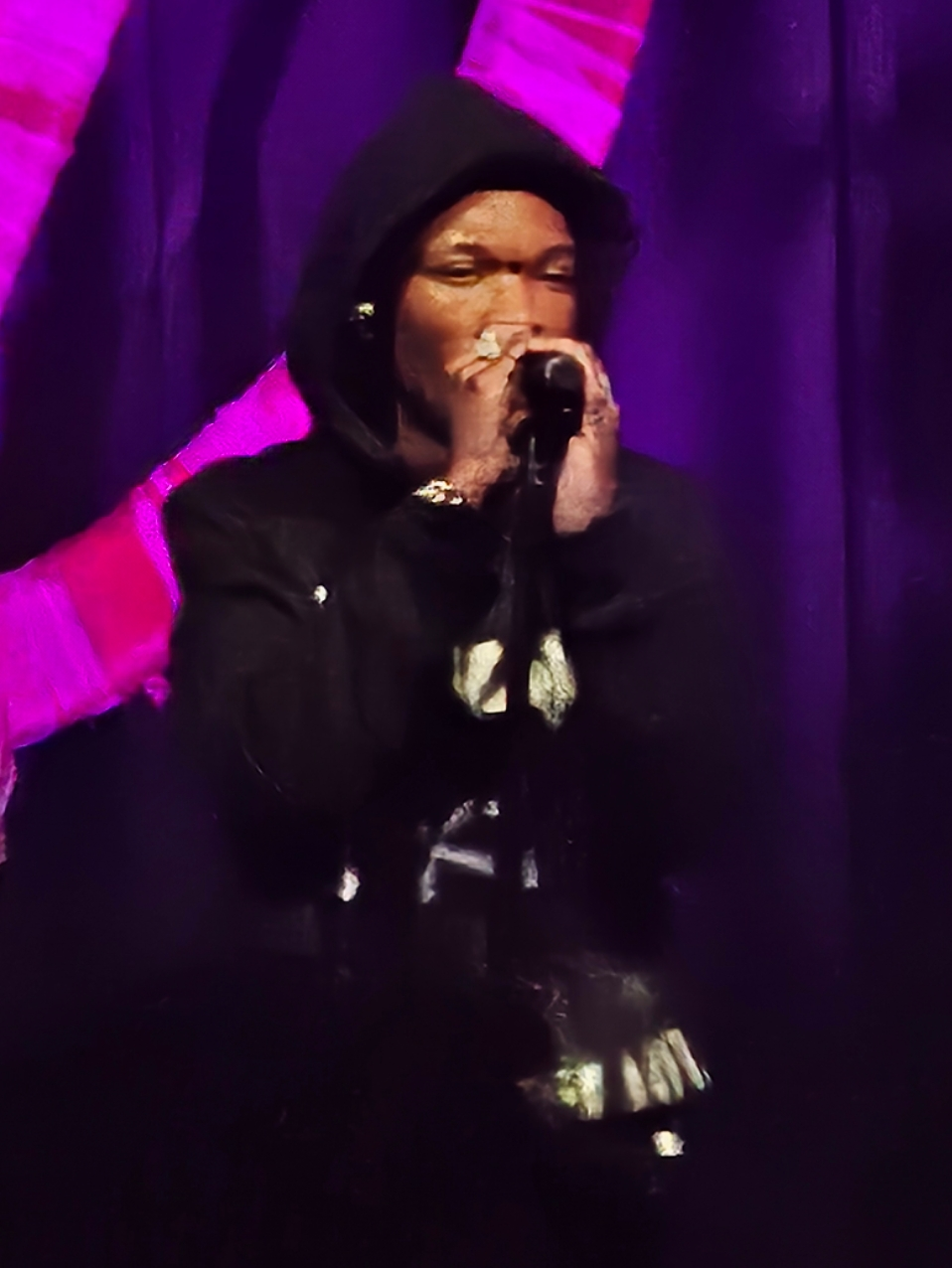
Burke performing at The Fonda Theatre in 2024

Burke released his debut EP, Petals to Thorns, through Darkroom and Interscope Records on May 26, 2023. (Note: Attributed to multiple references:) His second EP, The Lost Petals, was released on September 8 as an extension of the former. "Here with Me", released in 2022, reached the top 40 in 2023.

In July 2023, he was featured on "Superbloodmoon", a single from Holly Humberstone's debut album. That same year, Burke performed as an opening act on SZA's SOS Tour.

On February 9, 2024, Burke released his third EP, Withering, which consists of the two songs "Leave Her" and "2016". The release was characterized in music media as a double single, in line with the artist's established style. In March, Burke released the single "Feel It" for the soundtrack of Amazon Prime Video's television series Invincible. On December 19, 2024, he released the single "Where'd It Go Wrong?". He also performed "Remember Me", featured on the soundtrack for the second season of the steampunk action-adventure television series Arcane.

=== 2025: Withered ===
On February 7, 2025, Burke released the single "One More Dance". On February 28, he released the single "Crashing" with Kali Uchis, followed by "What Are You Waiting For" on March 28. He held a showcase for his debut studio album, Withered, at the SM Mall of Asia in Pasay, Philippines. During his Coachella debut, he face-planted while attempting a backflip. By November 2025, Burke had accumulated 3.6 million TikTok followers.

Burke also featured on Jasontheween's song "Summer Uptown", released on July 9, 2025.

The Withered tour began in August 2025. However, the tour and all public appearances were suspended on September 19, following the death of Celeste Rivas Hernandez and suspicions around Burke's involvement in her death. The deluxe edition of Withered, subtitled Marcescence, was also shelved. Interscope Records suspended all Burke-related promotions, while Crocs and Hollister Co. removed him from their promotional campaigns.

In the following days, the tour's European and Australian shows and Burke's planned performance at Spilt Milk in December were canceled. Kali Uchis sought removal of their collaboration song "Crashing" from streaming platforms. During the investigation, Burke's music streams on Spotify doubled from the previous week. In 2025, Burke became the top-searched musician and overall person on Google.

== Artistry ==
Homeschooled as a teen, Burke described living "vicariously" through his online friends, often referencing their experiences in his music. During a trip to the Fuji Rock festival, Burke cited anime as "one of my biggest influences", including series such as Dragon Ball Z. He has named SZA as a major influence on his work. He said that touring with her and building real-world connections allowed him to infuse more personal, "evolved" maturity into his work. Burke's singing voice has been described as a soft tenor with a vibrating falsetto.

Burke has spoken about an alter ego named Itami (or IT4MI). He described the persona as "the evil version of me" who "can manifest in different people, cause them to be chaotic, influence their bad decisions, and fuel their flame to do bad things," even suggesting Itami had written some of his songs.

== Killing of Celeste Rivas Hernandez ==
=== Discovery and investigation ===
On September 8, 2025, the Los Angeles Police Department (LAPD) discovered heavily decomposed human remains inside the front trunk of an impounded car registered to Burke, after a tow yard worker reported a foul odor. (Note: Attributed to multiple references:)

On September 16, 2025, the Los Angeles County Medical Examiner identified the body as that of 14-year-old Celeste Rivas Hernandez, from Lake Elsinore in Riverside County. Her body was discovered one day after what would have been her 15th birthday. Two days later, LAPD investigators executed a search warrant at Burke's Hollywood Hills rental property, seizing electronic materials including a computer. Shortly afterward, Burke's manager terminated the lease, and Burke moved out. Electronic materials, including a computer, were seized, Court documents unsealed in February 2026 revealed that Burke was the subject of a Los Angeles grand jury investigation into the death.

=== Arrest ===
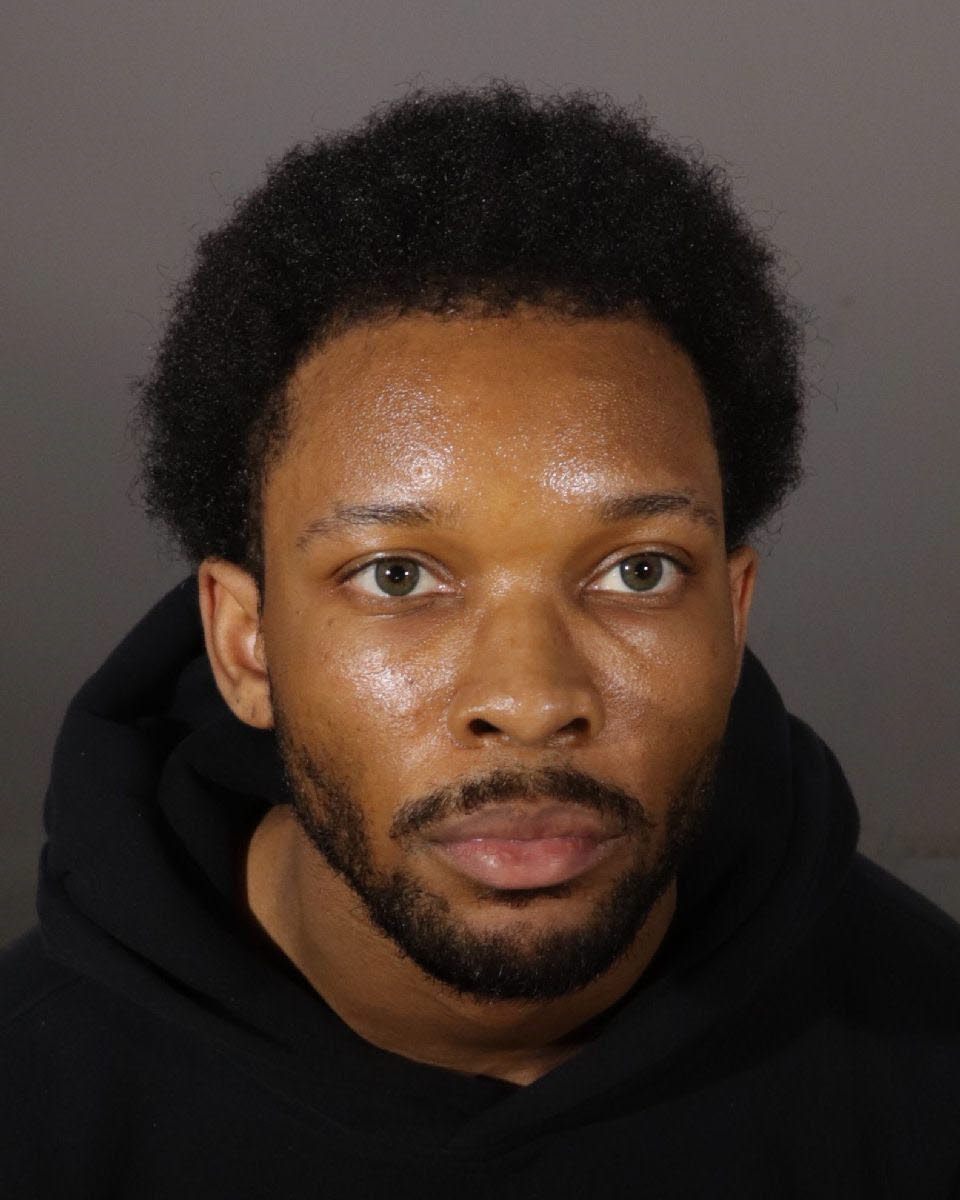
Mugshot of Burke taken after his arrest, April 20, 2026

On April 16, 2026, Burke was arrested by the LAPD at a house on Marmont Avenue on suspicion of the murder of Rivas. Burke's lawyer denied the charges, stating, "Let us be clear – the actual evidence in this case will show that David Burke did not murder Celeste Rivas Hernandez and he was not the cause of her death."

On April 20, LAPD and the District Attorney's Office announced that Burke would be charged with first-degree murder, lewd and lascivious acts with a minor under 14, and mutilation of a body. Prosecutor Nathan Hochman stated the case includes special circumstances of lying in wait and financial gain, alleging Burke killed Rivas to protect his music career. He is also accused of murdering a witness; prosecutors expect evidence to show the victim was involved in an investigation into alleged sexual acts committed by Burke while she was under 14. Prosecutors indicated they will consider seeking the death penalty. (Note: Attributed to multiple references:) Burke appeared in court that same day, and pleaded not guilty to all charges. As of April 2026, he was incarcerated at the Men's Central Jail in Los Angeles. Prosecutors said that they found a "significant amount of child pornography" on Burke's iCloud storage account. Burke allegedly has eight terabytes of data on an iCloud storage account; at the time of the hearing, prosecutors had downloaded one terabyte.

In June 2026, Burke and his legal team received a postponement of his preliminary hearing. Initially scheduled for May 1, then May 26, then June 29, the hearing was delayed for a third time to July 21. On July 21–24 and July 27 when the hearing took place, Burke was committed to stand trial on all counts. He was formally charged on August 31 and the trial is scheduled to start within 90 days of charges being brought.

=== Industry and collaborator reactions ===
Following the discovery of Rivas's body in September 2025, singer-songwriter Kali Uchis pulled their collaboration, "Crashing", from streaming services, stating Burke was "not [her] friend." Icelandic singer-songwriter Laufey pulled the song "This Is How It Feels" from streaming services. Olympic figure skater Alysa Liu announced she would be changing her routine, which included the Laufey song. Burke's song "What Are You Waiting For" was removed from the soundtrack for Madden NFL 26 without a statement from the publisher, EA Sports. He was also removed from the Spilt Milk 2025 festival lineup. Epic Games issued refunds to players who purchased in-game items featuring Burke's music in their game Fortnite, stating the refunds were the first step in a plan of changes to the items. Damiano David reissued his album Funny Little Fears, replacing the song "Tangerine", originally featuring Burke, with a solo version without his verse. Darkroom and Interscope Records ended its relationship with Burke in 2025. In April 2026, YouTube demonetized Burke's account, and Universal Music Group helped some of its artists remove their collaborations with him from streaming platforms. Spotify and Apple Music also faced calls to remove his music. "Remember Me", a contribution by Burke to the soundtrack of the second season of the Netflix animated series Arcane, was delisted from streaming services by Riot Games in May 2026.

"Summer Uptown" was a song by American internet personality and streamer JasonTheWeen, featuring Burke. It was self-released under the alias-label "Weenie Records" on July 9, 2025 as a single. The collaboration between the two happened when Nguyen invited Burke onto his Twitch live stream on July 2, 2025, after brief conversations and collaborations between the two beforehand. In May 2026, the song was removed from streaming services after Burke was arrested and charged with first-degree murder.

== Discography ==
Studio albums

- Withered (2025)

== Tours ==
=== Headlining ===
- Petals to Thorns Tour (2023)
- My House Is Not a Home Tour (2024)
- Withered World Tour (2025)

=== Supporting ===
- SZA – SOS Tour (2023)

== Awards and nominations ==
Award	Year	Category	Nominated Work	Result	Ref.
Streamy Awards	2023	Rolling Stone Sound of the Year	"Here with Me"	Nominated	
14th Hollywood Music in Media Awards	2023	Music Video (Independent)	"Romantic Homicide"	Nominated	
BMI Pop Awards	2024	Award-Winning Songs	"Here with Me"	Won	
BMI Pop Awards	2024	Award-Winning Songs	"Romantic Homicide"	Won	
Guild of Music Supervisors Awards	2025	Best Song Written and/or Recorded for Television	"Feel It"	Nominated	
Nickelodeon Kids' Choice Awards 2025	2025	Favorite Male Breakout Artist	D4vd	Nominated	
