= BandLab =

Cloud-based digital audio workstation

- Website type: Cloud Digital audio workstation
- Available in: English, French, Hindi, Japanese, Korean (Android only), Portuguese, Russian, Spanish, Turkish
- Predecessors: Composr (integrated 2016), Chew.tv (integrated 2019)
- CEO: Kuok Meng Ru
- Parent: BandLab Technologies
- Website: www.bandlab.com
- Advertising: Yes
- Users: Over 60,000,000
- Launched: November 2015
- Current status: Active
- Native clients on: Windows, macOS, Linux, Android, iOS, ChromeOS

BandLab is a freemium (previously freeware) online digital audio workstation (DAW) music tool by BandLab Technologies with social media functions, and distribution functions for creating music collaboratively, sharing it, and selling it. It can also be used non-collaboratively. It can operate on many different platforms inside a web browser or with a standalone app, available for iOS and Android. In January 2023, BandLab had 60 million creators.

== Features ==
BandLab is an entry level music production app to create songs in various genres.

- Free Audio & Vocal Preset effects, allowing members to change the sounds of vocals & other audio track sounds, for example 70s Funk bass, or robotic-sounding autotune vocals and other genre-specific sounds. The presets load and edit the free effects that BandLab comes with, configuring them to specific settings to achieve the chosen sound.
- BandLab comes with a free vocal pitch correction, a free drum machine, a sampler, synths, guitar amplifier simulations, reverb effect presets, etc. BandLab presets use effects everyone can access for free.
- Free mastering of mixes with a choice of sound, like tape noise.
- Free hosting of music creations, similarly to SoundCloud.
- Royalty-free samples

== History ==
In 2016, BandLab acquired the music company Composr and converted it into the BandLab platform, while also transferring staff to BandLab. In 2022, Mix Online reported that the BandLab DAW had raised $65 million in funding to expand.

The BandLab platform sponsored the NME awards 2022, which were titled "The BandLab NME Awards 2022". In 2023, Luh Tyler revealed to Rolling Stone that the song "Back Flippin'" was recorded and made in BandLab. In January 2024 d4vd gave an interview to Rolling Stone, in which he revealed his early songs were made in BandLab.

== Supported file formats and interfaces ==
Import
BandLab's Web Studio supports MIDI, mp3, mp4, wav, aac, m4a, and ogg files.	BandLab on iOS supports MIDI, mp3, m4a, and wav files.	BandLab on Android supports MIDI, 16/24-bit mp3, and 16-bit wav files.
Export
BandLab's Web Studio support MIDI, 128/192/320kbit/s mp3, and 16-bit wav files	BandLab on iOS and Android support m4a files	
Interfaces
USB, Lightning jack, Microphone jack, Line In jack

== Notable people ==
Many people have used BandLab, including rappers, musicians, and other artists. Notable people who used the platform include Luh Tyler, Wisp, d4vd,2Slimey, Nettspend and Roddy Ricch, Lil Dawg.

== Minimum system requirements ==
- Android 3.0 or above
- iOS 14 or above
- Browser version - a computer that can run the latest version of Microsoft Edge, Google Chrome, Mozilla Firefox or any Chromium-based browser.
- Internet: An internet connection is needed for syncing in BandLab.

== See also ==
- List of music software
- Comparison of digital audio editors
