= Lying in wait =

Concept in criminal law

In criminal law, lying in wait refers to the act of hiding and waiting for an individual with the intent to kill or inflict serious bodily harm to that person. Because lying in wait involves premeditation, some jurisdictions have established that lying in wait is considered a special or aggravating circumstance that allows for the imposition of harsher criminal penalties.

== History ==
Scholars have traced the origins of this doctrine as far back as 1389, when the English Parliament passed a law that denied the right of pardon to individuals who killed while lying in wait.

== In the United States ==
In 1794, Pennsylvania passed a law that defined first degree murder as "[a]ll murder which shall be perpetrated ... by lying in wait".

In the United States of America, some states modeled their penal codes after the Pennsylvania law, but by the beginning of the twenty-first century, only four states identified "lying in wait" as a "death qualifying act".

== See also ==
- Murder
- Capital punishment
- Ambush
