= Boss Film Studios =

Defunct American visual effects company

- Industry: Visual effects, CGI animation
- Founded: 1983
- Defunct: 1997
- Headquarters: 13335 Maxella Avenue, Marina del Rey, California, United States
- Key people: Richard Edlund

Boss Film Studios was a prominent American visual effects company, founded by visual effects veteran Richard Edlund after his departure from Industrial Light and Magic, producing visual effects for over thirty films from 1983 to 1997. Before that period Edlund had worked at ILM on films like Raiders of the Lost Ark (1981) and the original Star Wars trilogy (1977-1983).

== History ==
Richard Edlund planned to leave Industrial Light & Magic (ILM) and start his own business. Ghostbusters director Ivan Reitman convinced Columbia Pictures to collaborate with Metro-Goldwyn-Mayer (MGM), which also needed an effects studio, to advance Edlund $5 million to establish his own company, Boss Film Studios.

Boss Film Studios (originally Boss Film Corporation) initially undertook two projects, Ghostbusters and 2010, simultaneously. In an effort to set up the new venture quickly, Edlund acquired Douglas Trumbull's Entertainment Effects Group, taking over their Marina Del Rey facility.

=== Competition with ILM ===
Boss Film soon established itself as one of ILM's competitors as it contributed to such projects as Die Hard, Poltergeist II, and Big Trouble in Little China.

Edlund and his team chose to compete with ILM technically, continuing EEG's preference for using 65mm film for the creation of their optical effects work. This provided potentially cleaner effects than ILM's VistaVision format due to its much larger negative area.

=== Boss Game Studios ===
Boss Film branched out into video game production in 1994 through sister company Boss Game Studios. Boss Film also operated a commercial production company producing many television spots for companies including Budweiser, Dodge, United Airlines, and DHL.

=== Closure ===
Boss Film announced it was closing its doors on August 26, 1997, citing the difficulties of sustaining an independent effects house within the competitive environment at the time.

== Awards ==
- Nominated for the 1993 Academy Award for Best Visual Effects for Alien 3. The named nominees were Richard Edlund, Alec Gillis, Tom Woodruff Jr., and George Gibbs.
- Nominated for the 1989 Academy Award for Best Visual Effects for Die Hard. The named nominees were Richard Edlund, Al Di Sarro, Brent Boates, and Thaine Morris.
- Nominated for the 1987 Academy Award for Best Visual Effects for Poltergeist II. The named nominees were Richard Edlund, John Bruno, Garry Waller, and Bill Neil.
- Boss Film was awarded a Scientific and Engineering Award from the AMPAS in 1987 for the design and development of a Zoom Aerial (ZAP) 65mm Optical Printer. The winners were Richard Edlund, Gene Whiteman, David Grafton, Mark West, Jerry Jeffress, and Robert Wilcox.
- Nominated for the 1985 Academy Award for Best Visual Effects for both 2010 (Richard Edlund, Neil Krepela, George Jenson, and Mark Stetson) and Ghostbusters (Richard Edlund, John Bruno, Mark Vargo, and Chuck Gaspar).

== Notable Boss Film alumni ==
- Brent Boates
- John Bruno
- Christian Colquhoun
- Randall William Cook
- Randy Cooper
- Richard Edlund
- Todd Fulford
- Evan Jacobs
- Greg Jein
- Steve Johnson
- Patrick McClung
- Bill Neil
- Jim Rygiel
- Screaming Mad George
- Stephen Stanton
- Mark Stetson
- David K. Stewart
- Garry Waller
- Terry Windell
- Bruce MacRae

== Filmography ==
1984

- Ghostbusters (credited as Effects Entertainment Group)
- 2010 (credited as Effects Entertainment Group)

1985

- Fright Night

1986

- Big Trouble in Little China
- Poltergeist II: The Other Side
- Solarbabies
- Legal Eagles
- The Boy Who Could Fly

1987

- Masters of the Universe
- The Monster Squad
- Date with an Angel
- Leonard Part 6

1988

- Switching Channels
- Die Hard
- Vibes
- Twins
- Big Top Pee-wee

1989

- Tales from the Crypt series opening

1990

- The Hunt for Red October
- Ghost
- Solar Crisis

1992

- Alien 3
- Batman Returns
- Far and Away

1993

- Cliffhanger
- Last Action Hero
- Journey to Technopia

1994

- True Lies
- Drop Zone
- The Scout
- The Specialist
- Demon Knight

1995

- Outbreak
- Species
- Waterworld
- Heat
- Ace Ventura: When Nature Calls

1996

- Multiplicity

1997

- Turbulence
- Air Force One
- Starship Troopers

1998

- Desperate Measures
