= Cleanin' Up the Town: Remembering Ghostbusters =

2019 documentary film

- Film poster
- Directed by: Anthony Bueno
- Written by: Anthony Bueno; Claire Bueno
- Produced by: Anthony Bueno; Claire Bueno
- Starring: Dan Aykroyd; Ernie Hudson; Harold Ramis; Ivan Reitman
- Cinematography: Anthony Bueno
- Edited by: Anthony Bueno; Derek Osborn
- Music by: Dave Phaneuf; Jamie Evelyne Thompson
- Production company: Bueno Productions
- Release date: 7 October 2019 (CUFF)
- Running time: 128 minutes
- Country: United Kingdom
- Language: English

Cleanin' Up the Town: Remembering Ghostbusters is a 2019 British documentary film written, shot, edited, produced, and directed by Anthony Bueno. It is about the making of the 1984 film, Ghostbusters. Many members of that film's cast and crew are featured in the documentary, including Dan Aykroyd, Ernie Hudson, Harold Ramis, and Ivan Reitman.

In 2026, Too Hot to Handle: Remembering Ghostbusters II, a documentary film by Bueno on the 1989 sequel film, Ghostbusters II, wrapped after being in production for eight years.

== Cast ==
- Alice Drummond
- Annie Potts
- Dan Aykroyd
- David Margulies
- Ernie Hudson
- Harold Ramis
- Jennifer Runyon
- John Rothman
- Michael Ensign
- Sigourney Weaver
- Timothy Carhart
- William Atherton
- Ivan Reitman
- Joe Medjuck
- John Bruno
- Mark Stetson
- Michael C. Gross
- Neil Krepela
- Randall William Cook
- Richard Edlund
- Terry Windell
- Sheldon Kahn
- Steve Johnson
- Terri Hardin
- Thaine Morris
- Ray Parker Jr.

== Production ==
In 2016, a Kickstarter campaign was launched to raise funds for the film. It was successful.

== Reception ==
On the review aggregator website Rotten Tomatoes, 100% of 12 critics' reviews are positive, with an average rating of 7.7/10.

Chris Salce of Film Threat gave the film a score of 8.5 out of 10, writing, "Cleanin' Up the Town: Remembering Ghostbusters is a fun look back at what went into making such a classic horror-comedy that some did not even think would make a dent in cinema history. It contains something for every fan to be delighted by and will definitely give fans something to rewatch and revisit until the next installment hits theaters."

Richard Roeper of the Chicago Sun-Times gave the film three out of four stars and wrote, "As is the case with virtually every iconic blockbuster ever made, Ghostbusters was born of multiple script rewrites, budget concerns, battles over permits, long nights of filming, casting decisions large and small that worked out perfectly and hundreds of dedicated and hardworking professionals working together in the hopes the final product would somehow translate into movie magic. As Cleanin' Up the Town reminds us, sometimes you hit a home run for the ages."
