= Bill Neil (visual effects artist) =

American visual effects artist

- Born: William Herbert Neil; September 24, 1939 (age 86); Los Angeles, California, U.S.
- Occupation: Visual effects artist
- Relatives: Eleanor Coppola (sister); Francis Ford Coppola (brother-in-law)

Bill Neil (born September 24, 1939) is an American visual effects artist. He was nominated for an Academy Award in the category Best Visual Effects for the film Poltergeist II: The Other Side. He is the younger brother of documentary filmmaker Eleanor Coppola.

== Selected filmography ==
- The Rain People (1969; camera operator)
- He Is My Brother (1975; camera operator)
- Apocalypse Now (1979; camera operator)
- The Empire Strikes Back (1980)
- Raiders of the Lost Ark (1981)
- Poltergeist (1982)
- Return of the Jedi (1983)
- The Right Stuff (1983)
- Ghostbusters (1984)
- 2010: The Year We Make Contact (1984)
- Poltergeist II: The Other Side (1986; co-nominated with Richard Edlund, John Bruno and Garry Waller)
- Die Hard (1988)
- Dick Tracy (1990)
- Ghost (1990)
- Edward Scissorhands (1990)
- Bram Stoker's Dracula (1992)
- Judge Dredd (1995)
- Matilda (1996)
- The Fifth Element (1997)
- Tomorrow Never Dies (1997)
- I, Robot (2004)
- Superman Returns (2006)
