= Neil Krepela =

American special effects artist and cinematographer

Neil Joseph Krepela (born April 1947 in Omaha, Nebraska) is an American special effects artist and cinematographer.

He was nominated for two Academy Awards for Best Special Effects.

== Life ==
Neil Krepela was born in 1947 as son of Carl Charles Krepela (1905–1964) and Ruth Clarissa Krepela (Goodall, 1911–1983).

Krepelas father, who was an amateur photographer, sparked his interest in photography. When Krepela served in the US Navy, he started to photograph the places, he visited. He studied at the University of Nebraska and the Laney College. He later moved to the San Francisco Bay Area and started to shoot his own 16 mm films.

Krepela began his career in the movie industry in the 1970s. Richard Edlund engaged him as matte painting photographer for The Empire Strikes Back. Krepela worked at Industrial Light & Magic (ILM) on films such as Raiders of the Lost Ark, Dragonslayer, E.T. the Extra-Terrestrial, Star Trek II: The Wrath of Khan, Poltergeist, The Dark Crystal und Return of the Jedi. He later worked for Edlund's Boss Film Studios.

Krepela is married to Cristine Ackel and has two children from this marriage (born 2001, 2007). He has another daughter (born 1982) from his previous marriage.

== Selected filmography ==
- 1980: The Empire Strikes Back
- 1981: Raiders of the Lost Ark
- 1981: Dragonslayer
- 1982: E.T. the Extra-Terrestrial
- 1982: Star Trek II: The Wrath of Khan
- 1982: Poltergeist
- 1982: The Dark Crystal
- 1983: Return of the Jedi
- 1983: The American Snitch
- 1984: Ghostbusters
- 1984: 2010: The Year We Make Contact
- 1985: Fright Night
- 1986: Desert Bloom
- 1986: Poltergeist II: The Other Side
- 1986: Legal Eagles
- 1986: Big Trouble in Little China
- 1986: The Boy Who Could Fly
- 1986: Solarbabies
- 1987: Masters of the Universe
- 1987: The Monster Squad
- 1987: Date with an Angel
- 1988: Big Top Pee-wee
- 1988: Vibes
- 1989: Fletch Lives
- 1989–1995: Tales from the Crypt (TV series, 5 episodes)
- 1990: Solar Crisis
- 1992: Batman Returns
- 1993: Cliffhanger
- 1993: Last Action Hero
- 1994: True Lies
- 1994: The Scout
- 1994: The Specialist
- 1995: Outbreak
- 1995: Heat
- 1996: Multiplicity
- 2000: Dinosaur
- 2000: The Fantasticks
- 2002: Scooby-Doo
- 2003: Terminator 3: Rise of the Machines
- 2007: Meet the Robinsons
- 2008: City of Ember

== Award nominations ==
- 1985: nominated for an Academy Award for Best Special Effects, together with Richard Edlund, George Jenson and Mark Stetson for 2010: The Year We Make Contact
- 1994: nominated for an Academy Award for Best Special Effects, together with John Richardson, John Bruno und Pamela Easley for Cliffhanger
