= John Bruno (special effects) =

American director and visual effects artist

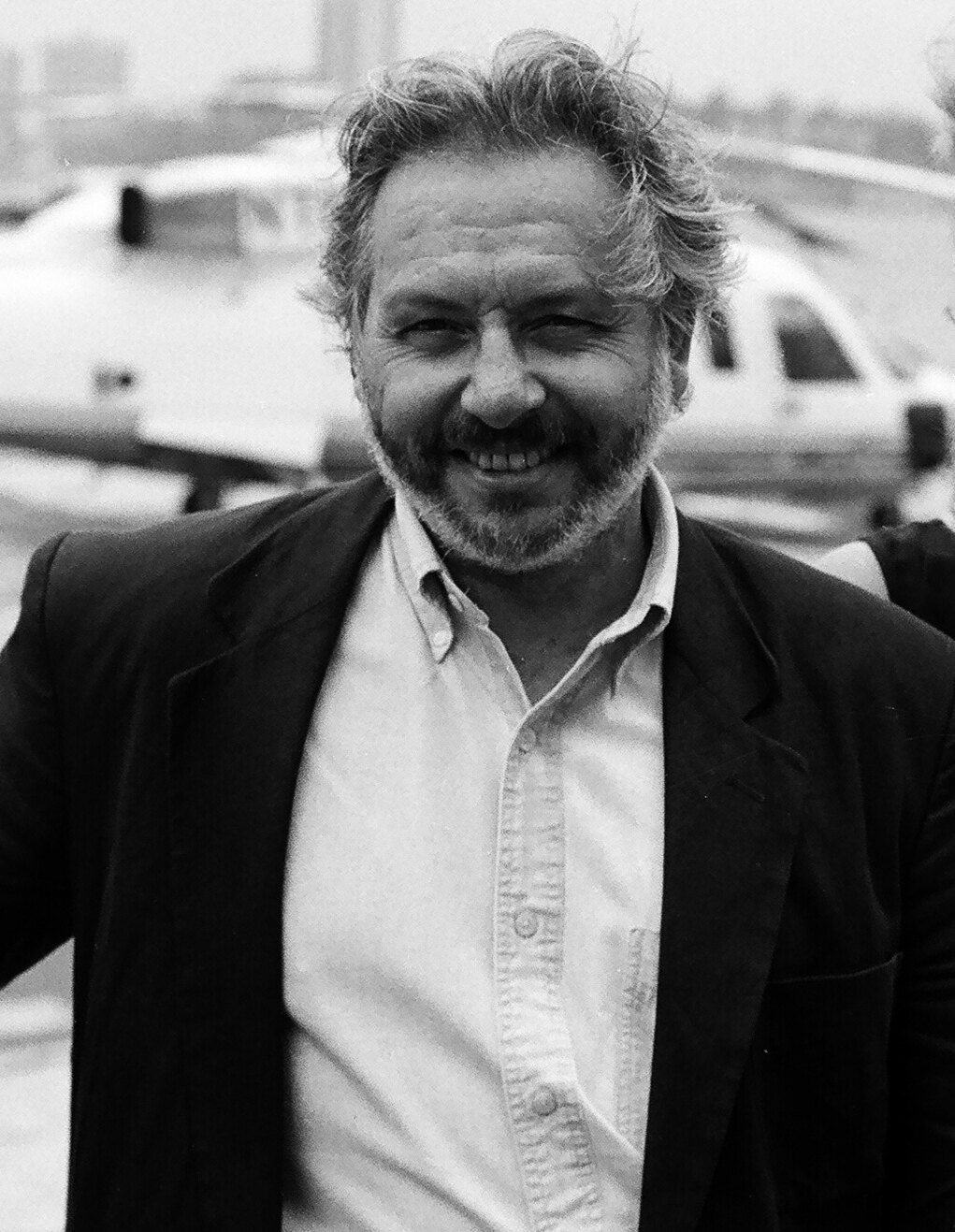
- Bruno on location in New York.
- Occupation: Visual effects artist
- Years active: 1971–present

John Bruno is an American visual effects artist and filmmaker known for his prolific collaborations with director James Cameron on films like Terminator 2: Judgment Day, True Lies, Titanic, Avatar, and The Abyss, for which he won the Academy Award for Best Visual Effects.

He has also contributed to other blockbuster films including Ghostbusters, Batman Returns, Cliffhanger, X-Men: The Last Stand, and Kingsman: The Secret Service. He also directed the 1999 science fiction horror film Virus, starring Jamie Lee Curtis and Donald Sutherland.

He currently holds five Oscar nominations and two BAFTA Award nominations.

== Filmography ==
=== Visual effects ===
- Poltergeist (1982) – Animation supervisor: Industrial Light & Magic
- Ghostbusters (1984) – Visual effects art director: Boss Film Studios, Entertainment Effects Group
- Cheech & Chong's The Corsican Brothers (1984) – Visual consultant
- Fright Night (1985) – Visual effects art director: Entertainment Effects Group
- Poltergeist II: The Other Side (1986) – Visual effects art director: Boss Film Studios
- The Abyss (1989) – Visual effects supervisor
- Terminator 2: Judgment Day (1991) – Visual effects designer
- Batman Returns (1992) – Visual effects supervisor: Boss Film Studios
- Cliffhanger (1993) – Visual effects supervisor
- True Lies (1994) – Visual effects supervisor: Digital Domain
- T2 3-D: Battle Across Time (1996) – Visual effects supervisor
- Titanic (1997) – Visual effects consultant
- Alien vs. Predator (2004) – Visual effects supervisor
- X-Men: The Last Stand (2006) – Visual effects supervisor
- Rush Hour 3 (2007) – Visual effects designer/supervisor
- Avatar (2009) – Visual effects supervisor
- Season of the Witch (2011) – Visual effects consultant: additional photography
- The Twilight Saga: Breaking Dawn – Part 1 (2011) – Visual effects supervisor
- The Twilight Saga: Breaking Dawn – Part 2 (2012) – Visual effects supervisor
- Movie 43 (2013) – Visual effects producer – Segment "Happy Birthday"
- Hercules (2014) – Visual effects supervisor
- Kingsman: The Secret Service (2014) – Additional visual effects supervisor

=== Directing ===
- Heavy Metal (1981) – 1 segment
- T2 3-D: Battle Across Time (1996) – with James Cameron and Stan Winston
- Virus (1999)
- Star Trek: Voyager (1999–2000) – 2 episodes
- Deepsea Challenge 3D (2014)

=== Acting ===
- True Lies (1994) – High-Rise Custodian

== Oscar history ==
All 6 films were in the category of Best Visual Effects

- 1984 Academy Awards – Nominated for Ghostbusters, nomination shared with Richard Edlund, Chuck Gaspar and Mark Vargo. Lost to Indiana Jones and the Temple of Doom
- 1986 Academy Awards – Nominated for Poltergeist II: The Other Side, nomination shared with Richard Edlund, Bill Neil and Garry Waller. Lost to Aliens.
- 1989 Academy Awards – The Abyss. Shared with Dennis Muren, Dennis Skotak and Hoyt Yeatman. Won.
- 1992 Academy Awards – Nominated for Batman Returns, nomination shared with Craig Barron, Michael Fink and Dennis Skotak. Lost to Death Becomes Her.
- 1993 Academy Awards – Nominated for Cliffhanger, nomination shared with Pamela Easley, Neil Krepela and John Richardson. Lost to Jurassic Park.
- 1994 Academy Awards – Nominated for True Lies, nomination shared with Thomas L. Fisher, Patrick McClung and Jacques Stroweis. Lost to Forrest Gump.
