= Chuck Gaspar =

American special effects artist

- Born: January 25, 1938; USA
- Died: January 15, 2009 (aged 70); USA
- Other names: Charles Gaspar; Chuck Gasper
- Occupation: Visual effects artist
- Years active: 1963-1999
- Children: Michael Gaspar and Dan Gaspar

Chuck Gaspar (January 25, 1938 – January 15, 2009) was an American special effects artist who worked on 70 different films and TV shows, such as The Birds, Ghostbusters, Pale Rider and Armageddon.

He was nominated at the 57th Academy Awards in the category of Best Visual Effects for his work on the film Ghostbusters. He shared his nomination with John Bruno, Richard Edlund and Mark Vargo.

In addition, he received a Technical Achievement Oscar five years after his death.

== Family ==
His Hungarian father was a special effects artist named Géza Gaspar. His sons, Michael Gaspar and Dan Gaspar, are special effects artist as well.
