= Thaine Morris =

American chemist, special and visual effects artist

- Born: Eads, Colorado, U.S.
- Occupations: Chemist, special and visual effects artist

Thaine Morris is an American chemist, special and visual effects artist. He was nominated for an Academy Award in the category Best Visual Effects for the film Die Hard.

== Selected filmography ==
- Die Hard (1988; co-nominated with Richard Edlund, Al DiSarro and Brent Boates)
