= Mark Vargo (special effects artist) =

Visual Effects Artist and cinematographer

- Born: May 15, 1954 (age 72); Alexandria, Virginia, USA
- Occupations: Visual effects artist and cinematographer
- Years active: 1980–present

Mark Vargo (born May 15, 1954) is a special effects artist, as well as a cinematographer. He was nominated at the 57th Academy Awards in the category of Best Visual Effects for his work on the film Ghostbusters. He shared his nomination with John Bruno, Richard Edlund and Chuck Gaspar.

Vargo worked at ILM from 1979 to 1983 contributing to the efforts in the optical department that won that company 4 consecutive Academy Awards for Best Visual Effects.

On May 1, 2018 Vargo assumed the role of "Cinematographer in Residence" and Associate Professor at Florida State University in Tallahassee, Florida.
