= Garry Waller =

American cinematographer

Garry Waller is an American director of photography and visual effects supervisor who has worked in Hollywood for nearly thirty years. He has been nominated for both an Academy Award and an Emmy Award and has worked with, among others, Tim Burton, Michael Mann, Mark Romanek, and Steven Spielberg. Garry also collaborated with director David Fincher on the visionary 'Constant Change' HP commercial and shot the 'Love is Strong' music video for the Rolling Stones, for which he received the MTV Video Music Award for Cinematography. Among his countless commercials credits are the iconic iPod silhouette spot for Apple Inc. and a recent Volkswagen campaign filmed on location in Shanghai, China.

Waller's Academy Award nomination was in the category Best Visual Effects for the film Poltergeist II: The Other Side. His nomination was shared with Richard Edlund, John Bruno and Bill Neil.
