= Brent Boates =

Canadian storyboard and visual effects artist

- Born: Vancouver, Canada
- Occupations: Storyboard and visual effects artist
- Years active: 1980–present

Brent Boates is a Canadian storyboard and visual effects artist. He was nominated at the 61st Academy Awards in the category Best Visual Effects for his work on the film Die Hard. His nomination was shared with Al DiSarro, Richard Edlund and Thaine Morris.

Working with Michael C. Gross and Richard Edlund, Brent designed the Ghostbusters logo used for the original film.

== Selected filmography ==
- Die Hard (1988; co-nominated with Richard Edlund, Al Disarro and Thaine Morris)
