= Al DiSarro =

- Born: 1951
- Died: 2011 (aged 59–60); Agua Dulce, California, USA
- Occupation: Visual effects artist
- Years active: 1982-2012 (Last film released posthumously)

Al DiSarro (1951-January 13, 2011) was a visual effects artist who was nominated for an Academy Award in the category of Best Visual Effects during the 61st Academy Awards. He was nominated for the film Die Hard. The nomination was shared with Brent Boates, Richard Edlund and Thaine Morris.

He also did some special effects for the TV show The A-Team.

== Selected filmography ==
- Act of Valor (2012) (released posthumously)
- Transformers (2007)
- Déjà Vu (2006)
- 2 Fast 2 Furious (2003)
- Paycheck (2003)
- Red Dragon (2002)
- The Sum of All Fears (2002)
- Speed 2: Cruise Control (1997)
- Turbulence (1997)
- Crimson Tide (1995)
- Ricochet (1991)
- Die Hard 2 (1990)
- The Hunt for the Red October (1990)
- Die Hard (1988)
- Predator (1987)
