= Michael C. Gross =

American artist, designer, and film producer

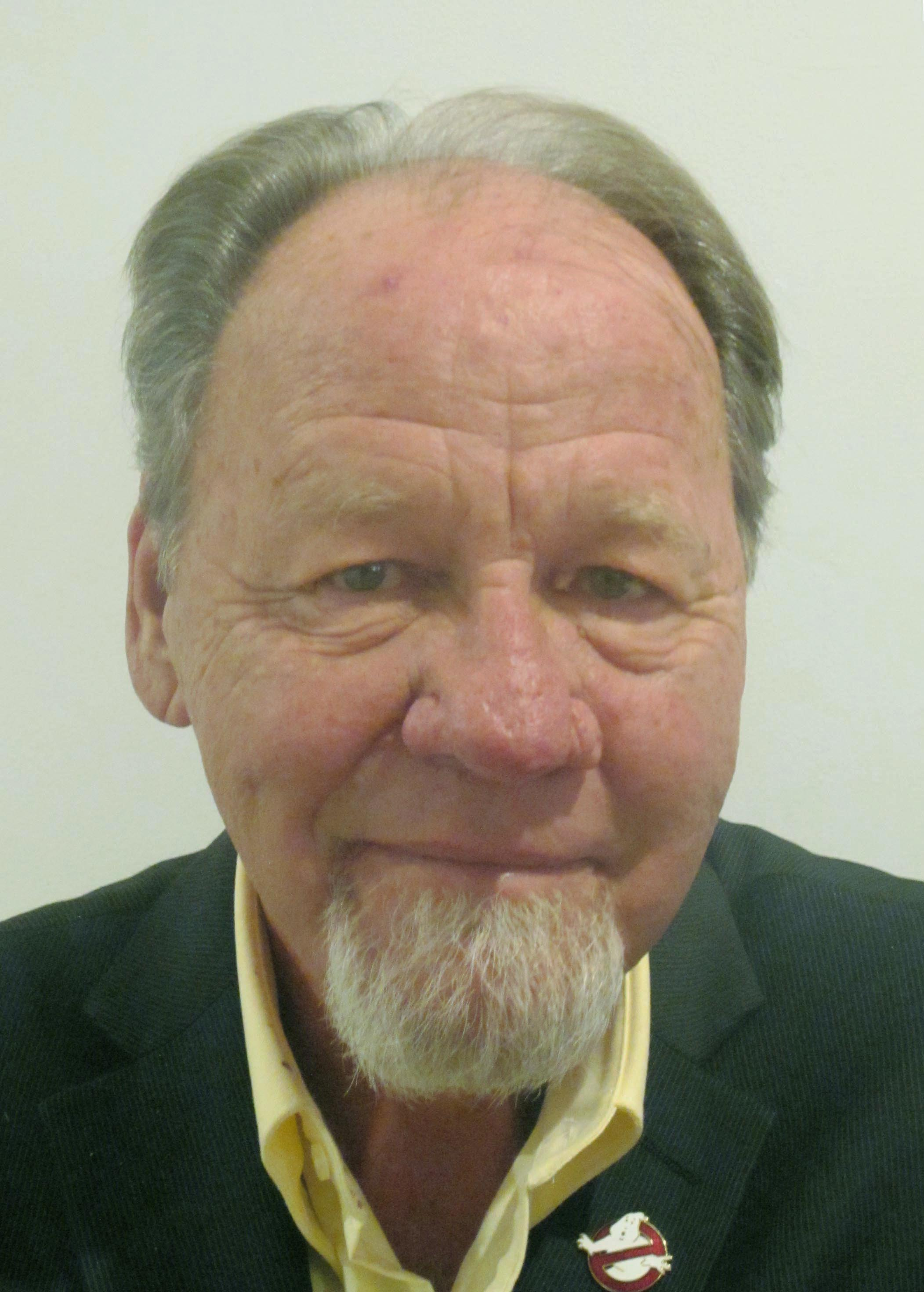
- Gross, September 17, 2014
- Born: October 3, 1945; Newburgh, New York, U.S.
- Died: November 16, 2015 (aged 70); Oceanside, California, U.S.
- Known for: film producer, artist, graphic designer
- Notable work: Ghostbusters
- Website: http://www.michaelcgross.com/

Michael C. Gross (October 3, 1945 – November 16, 2015) was an American artist, designer, and film producer. From 1970 to 1974 he art-directed National Lampoon magazine, and subsequently co-ran a design company.

In 1980 he started working in Hollywood, and is perhaps best remembered for designing the logo for the movie Ghostbusters (with Brent Boates) based on Dan Aykroyd’s original concept.

He served as producer or executive producer on 11 films.

== The 1960s ==
Gross was a designer for the 1968 Summer Olympics in Mexico City, and he art-directed EYE magazine.

== National Lampoon magazine ==
Gross was the art director of National Lampoon magazine. He was hired in 1970, and his work first appeared in the eighth issue of the magazine, the "Nostalgia" issue, which was published in November 1970.

His most famous National Lampoon piece was the cover for the January 1973 "Death" issue. He created "If You Don't Buy This Magazine, We'll Kill This Dog" (for an image of this cover, see the National Lampoon article).

== Design company ==
Gross left National Lampoon in 1974, and formed Pellegrini, Kaestle, & Gross, Inc. He became the personal designer for John Lennon, as well as being a consultant to the Muppets. In the late 1970s he art directed Esquire magazine and was also design director for Mobil Oil.

== Movie work ==
In 1980, Gross moved to California, where he worked as producer or an executive producer on 11 films, including Heavy Metal, Ghostbusters (he and Brent Boates designed the "no ghosts" logo, and he was surprised to see it so popular that it was painted on the nose of a B-52 bomber), Ghostbusters II, Twins, Beethoven, Legal Eagles, Kindergarten Cop and Dave. He was also the producer for 5 television shows, including The Real Ghostbusters and Beethoven.

== After 1995 ==
In 1995 Gross left Hollywood. He went back to painting, one of his first interests, and moved to Italy. He lived in Oceanside, California. He was a painter, photographer and museum curator, who taught and lectured.

== Family ==
Gross died on November 16, 2015, in Oceanside, California from cancer at the age of 70. Gross is survived by his son, Director of Photography Dylan Goss, daughter Gina, and grandchildren Luke, Oliver and Lou-Andrea.
