= Christian Colquhoun =

American animatronicist

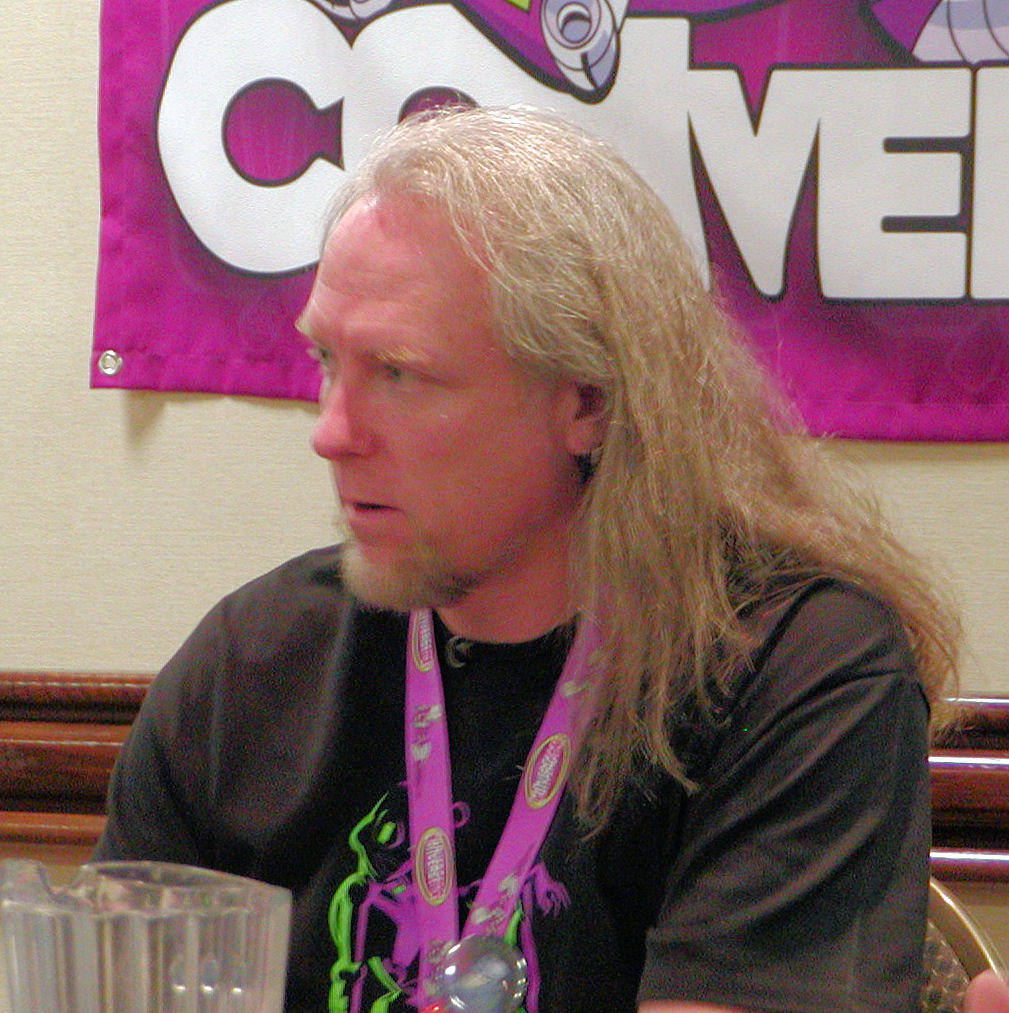
- Christian Colquhoun, 2008
- Occupation: special effects designer
- Years active: 1978 - present

Christian Colquhoun is a mechanical designer who has navigated his career into toy design, prop design and construction, special effects, mechanical effects makeup, and miniatures for motion pictures, television, and other forms of media, working for Mattel, Boss Film, Stetson Visual Services, New Deal Studios, Industrial Model and Design, and Stan Winston Studios.

He served as a mechanical designer on MouseHunt and Small Soldiers, puppeteer and effects supervisor on Inspector Gadget, animatronic effects supervisor on Galaxy Quest, and weapons designer for Van Helsing and Firefly.

Additional film work of Colquhoun's includes RoboCop, Resident Evil: Extinction, Live Free or Die Hard, Pirates of the Caribbean: Dead Man's Chest, Pirates of the Caribbean: At World's End, Lemony Snicket's A Series of Unfortunate Events, Minority Report, Team America: World Police, The Island, True Lies, Toys, Hook, Interview with the Vampire, The Hunt for Red October, The Lost World: Jurassic Park, and Terminator 2: Judgment Day.
