= Richard Edlund =

American visual effects artist (born 1940)

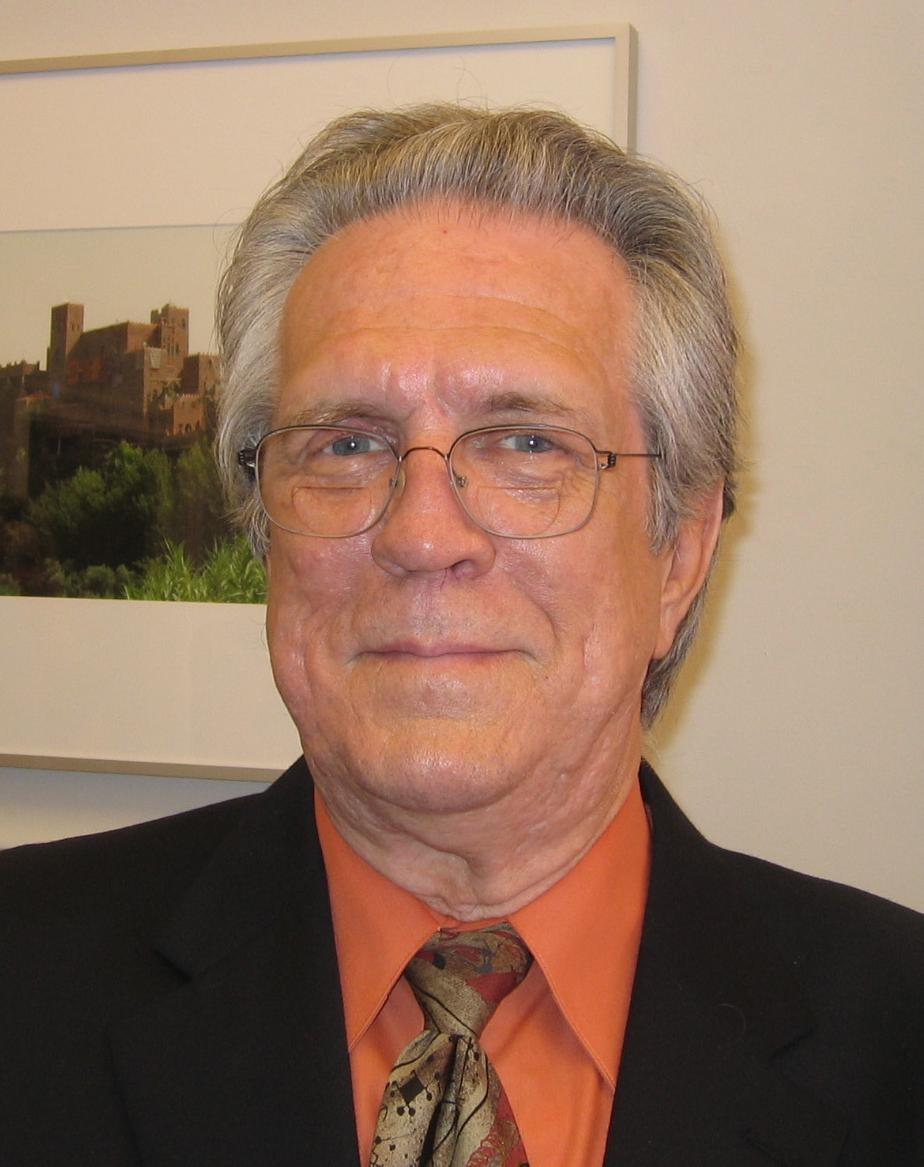
- Edlund at an exhibition of his photographs in 2008
- Born: December 6, 1940 (age 85); Fargo, North Dakota, U.S.
- Education: USC School of Cinematic Arts
- Occupation: Visual effects artist
- Organization: Academy of Motion Picture Arts and Sciences; American Society of Cinematographers; Visual Effects Society
- Known for: Co-founding ILM and Boss Film Studios; pioneering opticals & motion control photography
- Notable work: Star Wars series; Poltergeist series; Raiders of the Lost Ark; Ghostbusters
- Spouse: Rita Kogan (m. 1993; died 2019)
- Awards: See awards
- Website: www.richardedlund.com

Richard Edlund, ASC (born December 6, 1940) is an American visual effects artist and inventor. He was a founding member of Industrial Light & Magic, having already founded Pignose amplifiers, and later co-founded Boss Film Studios and DuMonde VFX. He has won two Academy Awards for Best Visual Effects (1978, Star Wars; 1982, Raiders of the Lost Ark), as well as two Special Achievement Awards, two Scientific and Technical Awards, and the Medal of Commendation. He is also a BAFTA and Emmy Award recipient.

== Life and career ==
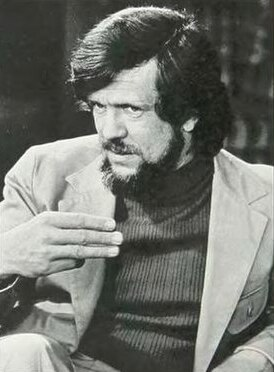
Edlund in 1978

Edlund was born in Fargo, North Dakota and raised in Fergus Falls, Minnesota. After first joining the United States Navy, he developed an interest in experimental film and attended the USC School of Cinematic Arts in the late 1960s. On the strength of a couple of short films, he was picked by John Dykstra to work as first cameraman at the embryonic Industrial Light & Magic on the production on Star Wars for which he shared an Academy Award.

Edlund continued to work with Dykstra on Battlestar Galactica but was invited back by George Lucas to work on The Empire Strikes Back. Edlund's considerable technical challenge on this film was to optically composite miniatures against a white background resulting in a second Academy Award. Edlund also did distinguished work for Lucas and ILM on Raiders of the Lost Ark and Poltergeist.

In 1983, following the completion of Return of the Jedi, Edlund set up his own effects company, Boss Films, whose credits include Ghostbusters, Big Trouble in Little China, Die Hard, The Hunt for Red October, Cliffhanger, Outbreak and Air Force One. Boss Film Studios was one of the first traditional effects houses that successfully transitioned from "tangible world" visual effects, to computer generated imagery, with many notable CGI artists beginning their careers at Boss.

Aside from film-work, Edlund also developed and manufactured the Pignose portable-style guitar amplifier (co-designed by Wayne Kimball). He is a Governor of the Academy of Motion Picture Arts and Sciences, a founder of the Academy's visual effects branch and is chair of the Branch Executive Committee, also chairman of the Academy’s Science and Technology Council. He also serves as board member of the Visual Effects Society and on the board of directors of the American Society of Cinematographers.

Edlund was married to Rita Kogan, the only daughter of entrepreneur and Taito founder Michael Kogan, before her death in 2019.

== Filmography ==
=== Film ===
| Year | Title | Contribution | Director | Notes |
|---|---|---|---|---|
| 1964 | The Creeping Terror | Opening & closing titles designer | Vic Savage | Uncredited |
| 1977 | Star Wars | Director of photography: VFX unit | George Lucas | Academy Award for Best Visual Effects |
| 1979 | The China Syndrome | VFX supervisor | James Bridges | |
| 1980 | The Empire Strikes Back | VFX supervisor | Irvin Kershner | Academy Award for Best Visual Effects |
| 1981 | Raiders of the Lost Ark | VFX supervisor | Steven Spielberg | Academy Award for Best Visual Effects |
| 1982 | Poltergeist | VFX supervisor | Tobe Hooper | BAFTA Award for Best Special Visual Effects; Nominated- Academy Award for Best Visual Effects |
| 1983 | Return of the Jedi | VFX supervisor | Richard Marquand | BAFTA Award for Best Special Visual Effects |
| 1984 | Ghostbusters | VFX supervisor | Ivan Reitman | Nominated- Academy Award for Best Visual Effects; Nominated- BAFTA Award for Best Special Visual Effects |
| 1984 | 2010: The Year We Make Contact | VFX supervisor | Peter Hyams | Nominated- Academy Award for Best Visual Effects |
| 1985 | Fright Night | VFX producer | Tom Holland | |
| 1986 | Poltergeist II: The Other Side | VFX supervisor | Brian Gibson | Nominated- Academy Award for Best Visual Effects |
| 1986 | Legal Eagles | VFX supervisor | Ivan Reitman | |
| 1986 | Big Trouble in Little China | VFX producer | John Carpenter | |
| 1986 | Solarbabies | VFX producer | Alan Johnson | |
| 1986 | The Boy Who Could Fly | VFX supervisor | Nick Castle | |
| 1987 | Masters of the Universe | VFX supervisor | Gary Goddard | |
| 1987 | The Monster Squad | VFX supervisor | Fred Dekker | |
| 1987 | Date with an Angel | VFX producer | Tom McLoughlin | |
| 1987 | Leonard Part 6 | VFX producer | Paul Weiland | |
| 1988 | Die Hard | VFX producer | John McTiernan | Nominated- Academy Award for Best Visual Effects |
| 1988 | Big Top Pee-wee | VFX producer | Randal Kleiser | |
| 1988 | Vibes | VFX producer | Ken Kwapis | |
| 1989 | Farewell to the King | Director of photography: VFX unit | John Milius | |
| 1990 | Ghost | VFX supervisor | Jerry Zucker | |
| 1990 | Solar Crisis | Producer | Richard C. Sarafian | |
| 1992 | Alien 3 | VFX producer | David Fincher | Nominated- Academy Award for Best Visual Effects; Nominated- BAFTA Award for Best Special Visual Effects |
| 1995 | Species | VFX supervisor | Roger Donaldson | |
| 1996 | Multiplicity | VFX supervisor | Harold Ramis | |
| 1997 | Turbulence | VFX supervisor | Robert Butler | |
| 1997 | Air Force One | VFX supervisor | Wolfgang Petersen | |
| 1998 | Desperate Measures | VFX supervisor | Barbet Schroeder | |
| 2000 | Bedazzled | VFX supervisor/2nd unit director | Harold Ramis | |
| 2004 | The Stepford Wives | VFX consultant | Frank Oz | |
| 2007 | Anamorph | VFX supervisor | Henry S. Miller | |
| 2007 | Charlie Wilson's War | VFX supervisor | Mike Nichols | |
| 2012 | 21 Jump Street | VFX supervisor | Phil Lord; Christopher Miller | |
| 2012 | Bullet to the Head | VFX supervisor | Walter Hill | |
| 2015 | Barely Lethal | VFX supervisor | Kyle Newman | |

=== Television ===
| Year | Title | Contribution | Notes |
|---|---|---|---|
| 1967 | Star Trek | 'The Companion' design | Episode: "Metamorphosis" |
| 1978 | Battlestar Galactica | Director of photography: VFX unit | Episodes: "Saga of a Star World Parts 1, 2, 3"; Primetime Emmy Award for Outstanding Individual Achievement - Creative Technical Crafts |
| 1988 | The Magical World of Disney | VFX producer | Episode: "Earth Star Voyager: Part 1" |
| 1989-95 | Tales from the Crypt | Producer | 5 episodes: "The Man Who Was Death"; "What's Cookin'"; "The Pit"; "The Assassin"; "You Murderer" |
| 2003 | Angels in America | VFX supervisor | Miniseries; 4 episodes Nominated- Primetime Emmy Award for Outstanding Special Visual Effects for a Miniseries, Movie or a Special |

== Awards and honors ==
| Institution | Category | Year | Work | Result |
|---|---|---|---|---|
| Academy Award | Best Visual Effects | 1978 | Star Wars | Won |
| Academy Award | Special Achievement Award | 1981 | The Empire Strikes Back | Won |
| Academy Award | Scientific and Technical Award | 1982 | The Empire Strikes Back (Note: for "the Empire Motion Picture Camera System" and "the concept and engineering of a beam-splitter optical composite motion picture printer.") | Won |
| Academy Award | Best Visual Effects | 1982 | Raiders of the Lost Ark | Won |
| Academy Award | Best Visual Effects | 1983 | Poltergeist | Nominated |
| Academy Award | Special Achievement Award | 1984 | Return of the Jedi | Won |
| Academy Award | Best Visual Effects | 1985 | Ghostbusters | Nominated |
| Academy Award | Best Visual Effects | 1985 | 2010: The Year We Make Contact | Nominated |
| Academy Award | Best Visual Effects | 1987 | Poltergeist II: The Other Side | Nominated |
| Academy Award | Scientific and Technical Award | 1987 | Poltergeist II: The Other Side (Note: for "the Zoom Aerial (ZAP) 65mm Optical Printer") | Won |
| Academy Award | Best Visual Effects | 1989 | Die Hard | Nominated |
| Academy Award | Best Visual Effects | 1993 | Alien 3 | Nominated |
| Academy Award | Medal of Commendation | 2007 | —N/a | Won |
| American Society of Cinematographers | President's Award | 2008 | —N/a | Won |
| BAFTA Award | Best Special Visual Effects | 1983 | Poltergeist | Won |
| BAFTA Award | Best Special Visual Effects | 1984 | Return of the Jedi | Won |
| BAFTA Award | Best Special Visual Effects | 1985 | Ghostbusters | Nominated |
| BAFTA Award | Best Special Visual Effects | 1993 | Alien 3 | Nominated |
| Primetime Emmy Award | Outstanding Individual Achievement - Creative Technical Crafts | 1979 | Battlestar Galactica ("Saga of a Star World") | Won |
| Primetime Emmy Award | Outstanding Special Visual Effects for a Miniseries, Movie or a Special | 2004 | Angels in America | Nominated |
| Saturn Award | Best Special Effects | 1981 | The Empire Strikes Back | Won |
| Saturn Award | Best Special Effects | 1982 | Raiders of the Lost Ark | Won |
| Saturn Award | Best Special Effects | 1984 | Return of the Jedi | Won |
| Saturn Award | Best Special Effects | 1985 | 2010: The Year We Make Contact | Nominated |
| Saturn Award | Best Special Effects | 1986 | Fright Night | Nominated |
| Saturn Award | Best Special Effects | 1987 | Poltergeist II: The Other Side | Nominated |
| Saturn Award | Best Special Effects | 1988 | Masters of the Universe | Nominated |
| Saturn Award | Best Special Effects | 1991 | Ghost | Nominated |
| Saturn Award | Best Special Effects | 1993 | Alien 3 | Nominated |
| Saturn Award | Best Special Effects | 1994 | Solar Crisis | Nominated |
| Saturn Award | Best Special Effects | 1996 | Species | Nominated |
| Sitges Film Festival | Best Special Effects | 1995 | Species | Won |
| Visual Effects Society | VES Fellowship | 2012 | —N/a | Won |
| Visual Effects Society | Lifetime Achievement Award | 2013 | —N/a | Won |
