= Poltergeist (franchise) =

Horror film franchise

- Official franchise logo
- Created by: Steven Spielberg
- Original work: Poltergeist
- Owners: Metro-Goldwyn-Mayer (Note: Excluding the original 1982 film, which is currently owned by Warner Bros. via Turner Entertainment Co. and the 2015 reboot film is owned by 20th Century Studios) (Amazon MGM Studios)
- Years: 1982–2015

Films and television
- Films: Poltergeist (1982); Poltergeist II: The Other Side (1986); Poltergeist III (1988); Poltergeist (2015)
- Television series: Poltergeist: The Legacy (1996–1999)

Poltergeist is an American horror film franchise distributed by Metro-Goldwyn-Mayer during the 1980s. The original trilogy revolves around the members of the Freeling family, who are stalked and terrorized by a group of ghosts, led by a demon known as the Beast, that are attracted to the youngest daughter, Carol Anne. The original film was co-written and produced by Steven Spielberg. The Poltergeist films collected a total of approximately $132 million at the United States box office. Heather O'Rourke and Zelda Rubinstein were the only cast members to appear in all three films.

Fox 2000 Pictures and Metro-Goldwyn-Mayer released a "revisionist" reboot of the series on May 22, 2015.

== Films ==
Film	U.S. release date	Director(s)	Screenwriter(s)	Story by	Producer(s)
Poltergeist	June 4, 1982	Tobe Hooper	Steven Spielberg, Michael Grais & Mark Victor	Steven Spielberg	Frank Marshall & Steven Spielberg
Poltergeist II: The Other Side	May 23, 1986	Brian Gibson	Michael Grais & Mark Victor	—N/a	Michael Grais & Mark Victor
Poltergeist III	June 10, 1988	Gary Sherman	Gary Sherman & Brian Taggert	—N/a	Barry Bernardi
Poltergeist	May 22, 2015	Gil Kenan	David Lindsay-Abaire	—N/a	Sam Raimi, Rob Tapert & Roy Lee

=== Poltergeist (1982) ===
Poltergeist is the original film in the trilogy, directed by Tobe Hooper, co-written by Steven Spielberg and released on June 4, 1982. The story focuses on the Freeling family, which consists of parents Steve (Craig T. Nelson) and Diane (JoBeth Williams); teenage daughter Dana (Dominique Dunne); eight-year-old Robbie (Oliver Robins); and five-year-old Carol Anne (Heather O'Rourke), who live in Cuesta Verde, a California housing development which comes to be haunted by ghosts. The apparitions, under the control of a demon known as the "Beast", communicate through the family's television set and can only be heard by Carol Anne. Attracted to her life force and believing she will help lead them into the "Light", the specters abduct Carol Anne through her bedroom closet, which acts as a portal to their dimension. Much of the film involves the family's efforts to rescue their daughter, aided by a group of parapsychologists (Beatrice Straight, Martin Casella, Richard Lawson) and spiritual medium Tangina Barrons (Zelda Rubinstein). Carol Anne is eventually rescued from the other side and, following a second attack by the Beast that reveals the ghosts had originated from an improperly relocated cemetery beneath the neighborhood, the Freelings flee Cuesta Verde just before the house implodes and disappears into another dimension.

=== Poltergeist II: The Other Side (1986) ===
The first sequel, Poltergeist II: The Other Side, directed by Brian Gibson and released on May 23, 1986, takes place one year after the events in Poltergeist and offers an alternate explanation of the ghosts' origin. The film also develops the identity and backstory of the Beast, who lived during the 19th century as a religious zealot named Reverend Henry Kane (Julian Beck). Kane was the leader of a utopian cult, who in anticipation of the end of the world, sealed themselves in a cavern located directly below what later became the Freeling property. Kane is anxious to possess Carol Anne to continue manipulating his followers after death. The ghosts follow and attack the Freelings at their current household. Aided by an American Indian shaman named Taylor (Will Sampson), the Freelings manage to escape from Kane and his followers a second time.

=== Poltergeist III (1988) ===
The final film in the original trilogy, Poltergeist III, directed and co-written by Gary Sherman, was released on June 10, 1988. To protect Carol Anne, the Freelings have sent her to live temporarily in a Chicago skyscraper with skeptical relatives Pat and Bruce Gardner (Nancy Allen and Tom Skerritt) and their daughter Donna (Lara Flynn Boyle). However, during psychiatric sessions, Carol Anne's recollection of her experiences enables Kane and his followers to locate her and make contact through the building's ubiquitous mirrors. The ghosts abduct Carol Anne and then Donna, prompting Pat, Bruce, and Donna's boyfriend Scott (Kipley Wentz) to enlist the help of Tangina, who eventually escorts Kane into the spectral Light, thereby sacrificing herself to save the family.

=== Poltergeist (2015) ===
A reboot of the original film, Poltergeist was directed by Gil Kenan and released on May 22, 2015. It centers on a family struggling to make ends meet who relocate to a suburban home. As in the original, the youngest daughter is kidnapped by spirits that inhabit the house. Sam Rockwell and Rosemarie DeWitt star as the married couple, Kennedi Clements plays the daughter, and Jared Harris plays the host of a paranormal-themed TV show who comes to the aid of the family.

== Television ==
Series	Season	Episodes	First released	Last released	Showrunner(s)	Network(s)
Poltergeist: The Legacy	4	87	April 21, 1996	November 12, 1999		Showtime & Syfy

=== Poltergeist: The Legacy (1996–1999) ===
A spin-off television series, Poltergeist: The Legacy, ran from 1996 to 1999, though it does not have any connection to the films other than the title.

=== Future ===
In October 2023, Variety reported that a television series is in early development by Amazon MGM Studios. It is set to be executive produced by Darryl Frank and Justin Falvey of Amblin Television.

== Cast and crew ==
=== Cast ===
The following table shows the cast members who played the primary characters in the film series.

Character	Original series			Remake	Television series
Character	Poltergeist	Poltergeist II The Other Side	Poltergeist III	Poltergeist	Poltergeist The Legacy
Character	1982	1986	1988	2015	1996–1999
Carol Anne Freeling	Heather O'Rourke	Heather O'Rourke	Heather O'Rourke		
Steven "Steve" Freeling	Craig T. Nelson	Craig T. Nelson	Mentioned		
Diane Freeling (née Wilson)	JoBeth Williams	JoBeth Williams Jaclyn Bernstein^{Y}	Mentioned		
Dana Freeling	Dominique Dunne	Mentioned	Mentioned		
Robert "Robbie" Freeling	Oliver Robins	Oliver Robins	Mentioned		
Dr. Martha Lesh	Beatrice Straight				
Ryan Mitchell	Richard Lawson				
Dr. Marty Casey	Martin Casella				
Tangina Barrons	Zelda Rubinstein	Zelda Rubinstein	Zelda Rubinstein		
Reverend Henry Kane / "The Beast"		Julian Beck Noble Craig (Vomit Creature)	Nathan Davis Corey Burton^{V}		
Jessica "Grandma Jess" Wilson		Geraldine Fitzgerald Kelly Jean Peters^{Y}			
Taylor		Will Sampson			
Bruce Gardner			Tom Skerritt		
Patricia "Pat" Wilson-Gardner Trish Wilson		Mentioned	Nancy Allen		
Donna Gardner			Lara Flynn Boyle		
Scott			Kipley Wentz		
Dr. Seaton			Richard Fire		
Madison "Maddy" Bowen				Kennedi Clements	
Eric Bowen				Sam Rockwell	
Amy Bowen				Rosemarie DeWitt	
Griffin "Griff" Bowen				Kyle Catlett	
Kendra Bowen				Saxon Sharbino	
Carrigan Burke				Jared Harris	
Dr. Brooke Powell				Jane Adams	
Boyd				Nicholas Braun	
Dr. Derek Rayne					Derek de Lint
Nick Boyle					Martin Cummins
Alexandra "Alex" Moreau					Robbi Chong
Father Philip Callaghan					Patrick Fitzgerald
Dr. Rachel Corrigan					Helen Shaver
Katherine "Kat" Corrigan					Alexandra Purvis
William Sloan					Daniel J. Travanti
Kristin Adams					Kristin Lehman
Note(s): 1. Henry Kane in his "Vomit Creature" incarnation is portrayed by Noble Craig.; 2. Though Henry Kane was portrayed by Nathan Davis, he was voiced by Corey Burton.

=== Crew ===
Occupation	Film			
Occupation	Poltergeist	Poltergeist II: The Other Side	Poltergeist III	Poltergeist
Occupation	1982	1986	1988	2015
Director	Tobe Hooper	Brian Gibson	Gary Sherman	Gil Kenan
Writer(s)	Michael Grais; Steven Spielberg; Mark Victor	Michael Grais; Mark Victor	Gary Sherman; Brian Taggert	David Lindsay-Abaire
Producer(s)	Frank Marshall; Steven Spielberg	Michael Grais; Mark Victor	Barry Bernardi	Roy Lee; Sam Raimi; Robert Tapert
Composer	Jerry Goldsmith	Jerry Goldsmith	Joe Renzetti	Marc Streitenfeld
Cinematographer	Matthew F. Leonetti	Andrew Laszlo	Alex Nepomniaschy	Javier Aguirresarobe
Editor	Michael Kahn	Thom Noble; Bud S. Smith; M. Scott Smith	Ross Albert	Jeff Betancourt; Bob Murawski
Distributor by	MGM/UA Entertainment Co.	MGM Entertainment Co.	MGM/UA Communications Co.	20th Century Fox
Production company	Metro-Goldwyn-Mayer; SLM Production Group; Mist Entertainment; Amblin Productions	Metro-Goldwyn-Mayer	Metro-Goldwyn-Mayer	Fox 2000 Pictures; Metro-Goldwyn-Mayer; Ghost House Pictures; Vertigo Entertainment
Release date	June 4, 1982	May 23, 1986	June 10, 1988	May 22, 2015
Runtime	114 minutes	91 minutes	98 minutes	93 minutes

== Reception ==
=== Box office performance ===
Film	Release date (US)	Budget	Box office revenue			Reference
Film	Release date (US)	Budget	United States	Foreign	Worldwide	Reference
Poltergeist (1982)	June 4, 1982	$10.7 million	$76,606,280	$45,099,739	$121,706,019	
Poltergeist II: The Other Side	May 23, 1986	$19 million	$40,996,665	$33,929,000	$74,925,665	
Poltergeist III	June 10, 1988	$9.5 million	$14,114,488	—N/a	$14,114,488	
Poltergeist (2015)	May 22, 2015	$35 million	$47,425,125	$48,210,406	$95,635,531	
Total		$74.2 million	$178,545,003	—N/a	$306,381,703	
List indicator: A dark grey cell indicates the information is not available for the film.

=== Critical and public response ===
Film	Rotten Tomatoes	Metacritic
Poltergeist (1982)	88% (59 reviews)	79 (7 reviews)
Poltergeist II: The Other Side	20% (54 reviews)	49 (10 reviews)
Poltergeist III	15% (20 reviews)	40 (10 reviews)
Poltergeist (2015)	29% (138 reviews)	47 (27 reviews)

=== Poltergeist curse ===
The "Poltergeist curse" is a rumored curse attached to the Poltergeist trilogy and its crew, derived from the deaths of two young cast members in the six years between the releases of the first and third films. The rumor and the surrounding deaths were explored in a 2002 episode of E! True Hollywood Story titled "Curse of Poltergeist".

- Dominique Dunne, who played eldest daughter Dana in the first film, died on November 4, 1982, at age 22 after being strangled by her ex-boyfriend John Thomas Sweeney. He was convicted of voluntary manslaughter and sentenced to six years in prison, but was paroled after serving three and a half years.
- Heather O'Rourke, who played Carol Anne in all three Poltergeist films, died on February 1, 1988, at the age of 12 due to complications from an acute bowel obstruction.

== Documentary ==
The Curse of Poltergeist, a documentary film based on the mystery of the franchise, was set to begin shooting in November 2015, with Adam Ripp as director; financing and production was to be provided by his company Vega Baby, alongside Indonesia-based MD Pictures. The documentary intended to focus on the life and experiences of actor Oliver Robins, who played Robbie Freeling in the first and second installments of the franchise, as a way to explore the tragedies that have befallen those involved with the films. The movie has yet to be produced.

== See also ==
- List of ghost films
