= Poltergeist (2015 film) =

American film by Gil Kenan

- Theatrical release poster
- Directed by: Gil Kenan
- Screenplay by: David Lindsay-Abaire
- Based on: Poltergeist by: Steven Spielberg; Michael Grais; Mark Victor
- Produced by: Sam Raimi; Rob Tapert; Roy Lee
- Starring: Sam Rockwell; Rosemarie DeWitt; Jane Adams; Jared Harris
- Cinematography: Javier Aguirresarobe
- Edited by: Jeff Betancourt; Bob Murawski
- Music by: Marc Streitenfeld
- Production companies: Fox 2000 Pictures; Metro-Goldwyn-Mayer Pictures; Ghost House Pictures; Vertigo Entertainment
- Distributed by: 20th Century Fox
- Release date: May 22, 2015
- Running time: 93 minutes
- Country: United States
- Language: English
- Budget: $35 million
- Box office: $95.4 million

Poltergeist is a 2015 American supernatural horror film directed by Gil Kenan, written by David Lindsay-Abaire, and produced by Sam Raimi, Rob Tapert, and Roy Lee. It is a remake of the 1982 film and is the fourth installment overall in the Poltergeist franchise. The film stars Sam Rockwell, Rosemarie DeWitt, Jared Harris, and Jane Adams, and follows a family who arrive at their new home and begin experiencing paranormal occurrences.

The project was announced in 2008 with Vadim Perelman initially directing the project from a screenplay written by Juliet Snowden and Stiles White. It was delayed several times and entered into development hell. By 2012, a remake of the 1982 film was announced with Raimi producing alongside Lee, Tapert, and Nathan Kahane. Kenan was announced as director in 2013 and principal photography took place in Toronto from September to December that year.

Poltergeist was theatrically released on May 22, 2015, by 20th Century Fox. It was not well received by critics and was deemed inferior to the original, though it was a moderate box office success, grossing $95 million worldwide against a budget of $35 million.

== Plot ==
When shown a house that has recently come on the market that fits their price range, the Bowen family purchases it and moves in. Their house was built on an old cemetery, although the property developer was supposed to have relocated the human remains.

The first night, they hear eerie noises in the walls, and 9-year-old Griffin Bowen finds a box containing clown dolls that had been left at the house. In the middle of the night, the lights and electronic devices start turning on and off, as an unseen force appears to move through the home. The commotion wakes Griffin, who finds his 6-year-old sister Maddy in the living room talking to the static on the television. She tells Griffin someone is coming, and he attempts to unplug the TV, causing the lights to go out of control. Maddy later says "They're here" while touching the television screen.

The following evening, Griffin's parents, Eric and Amy, go to dinner with friends, leaving their three children at home. Kendra, Griffin's 16-year-old sister, wakes up to a sound in the laundry room. While investigating the noise, the floor cracks and a corpse's hand emerges. It grabs onto her ankle, but she manages to pull herself up. Meanwhile, the dolls seem to be moving by themselves. One of the dolls attacks Griffin, who destroys it and runs from his bedroom. He finds Maddy, scared, and tells her to stay in her room while he goes to look for Kendra. Maddy is then lured by the light from her lamp and a stuffed toy into her closet, becoming lost in an endless black void. As she turns to see her bedroom drifting away further, ghosts drag her into the darkness. Meanwhile, the branches of an old willow tree outside their house grab Griffin through a window and pull him outside. Amy and Eric arrive home to see Griffin tangled in the branches, which release their grip when they come close, while Kendra tells them that she cannot find Maddy.

The family hears Maddy's voice emanating from the television. Amy places her hand on the screen. Maddy's static hand then appears to be touching Amy's hand from the other side of the TV screen. Amy and Griffin then visit the Paranormal Research department for help. The staff set up equipment in the house and install GPS devices on everyone. During the setup, one of the installers, Boyd, is frightened by the spirits while drilling a hole into Maddy's closet wall. While trying to contact Maddy, Eric destroys the closet wall, throwing a section of a broken table into the void beyond the closet; the table segment falls back into the living room (nearly crushing Griffin), revealing a potential portal for Maddy to escape through. The haunting is caused by a poltergeist. The lead investigator, Dr. Brooke Powell, decides to call her ex-husband, occult specialist and television personality, Carrigan Burke.

Carrigan explains that Maddy is a possible psychic, able to communicate with spirits. The ghosts are trapped and angry because only the headstones were transported to the new cemetery, but the bodies remain; they plan on using Maddy "to free them from purgatory". To get Maddy back, Carrigan anchors a rope in Maddy's room and tosses it into the vortex. They attempt to use Griffin's toy drone to guide Maddy out, but when it locates Maddy inside the void, the ghosts put it out of service. Griffin, guilt-ridden over leaving Maddy alone in the first place, goes through the portal. When he finds Maddy, the ghosts attempt to destroy the rope to trap them, but Griffin and Maddy manage to return through the portal into the house. The family get in their car and begin to leave, but the ghosts drag them back into the house, flipping the car in the process in order to abduct Maddy. The family saves her from being pulled into the portal, and Carrigan decides that he must go into the vortex and lead the spirits into the light. The Bowens flee the neighborhood as the spirits destroy the house, soaring into the sky as a beacon of light. Later, Dr. Powell and her team manage to locate Burke's GPS in the shattered remains of the house.

As the Bowens look for a new house, the realtor shows them one with much closet space and an old tree in the backyard, but the Bowens drive away. Meanwhile, Carrigan starts hosting his ghost program with Dr. Powell. (Note: This is revealed during the end credits.)

== Cast ==
- Sam Rockwell as Eric Bowen
- Rosemarie DeWitt as Amy Bowen
- Saxon Sharbino as Kendra Bowen
- Kyle Catlett as Griffin Bowen
- Kennedi Clements as Madison Bowen
- Jared Harris as Carrigan Burke
- Jane Adams as Dr. Brooke Powell
- Nicholas Braun as Boyd
- Susan Heyward as Sophie
- Soma Bhatia as Lauren
- Karen Ivany as Mrs. Stoller

== Production ==
=== Development ===
During the 1990s, Universal Studios briefly toyed with the idea of making a prequel film for the character of Reverend Kane. In 2003, Metro-Goldwyn-Mayer Pictures began development on a fourth installment of the Poltergeist series. Under the title Poltergeist: Kayeri, Clint Morris was tapped to pen the script, which would have ignored the events of Poltergeist III. Craig T. Nelson and JoBeth Williams were courted to reprise their roles, while the part of Carol Anne was to be recast due to the passing of Heather O'Rourke in 1988. In November 2005, Nelson was officially on board and Hilary Duff was reportedly in the running for Carol. By November 2006, rumors emerged that the studio was intending to "retool" Kayeri as a remake of the first film "frame for frame". However, these reports were dispatched shortly after. In 2007, the studio decided to move in a new direction for the sequel and turned to Michael Grais to write a new script, now titled Poltergeist: In The Shadows.

Development on In the Shadows quickly stalled out as well. In August 2008, the studio officially moved forward with a remake of the original film. Juliet Snowden and Stiles White of Boogeyman were hired as screenwriters. The next month, Vadim Perelman began talks to direct the film. The studio slotted a release date of November 24, 2010. Production was to commence in early 2010. The film's tight deadline, as well as MGM's financial issues, would delay the film to an unspecified date in 2011.

In April 2012, The Hollywood Reporter announced that Sam Raimi, Nathan Kahane, Roy Lee and Robert Tapert would produce. Raimi helped oversee the search for a helmer. David Lindsay-Abaire, who worked on Raimi's Oz: The Great and Powerful, was to write a new screenplay. That August, Raimi affirmed the film was still on track. By October, conflicting reports materialized that Raimi would direct the film after Lindsey-Abaire misspoke in an interview. In March 2013, Gil Kenan of Monster House was hired to direct the film, while Roy Lee would join Raimi and Tapert as producers. In June, 20th Century Fox boarded the film to co-produce and distribute the film. Production was gearing up to begin that fall.

=== Casting ===
In September 2013, Sam Rockwell, Rosemarie DeWitt, Jared Harris and Jane Adams were cast in the film. Tom Cruise and Richard Armitage were considered for the role of Eric Bowen. Saxon Sharbino, Kyle Catlett and Kennedi Clements were cast in the film.

=== Filming ===
Principal photography began on September 23 and ended on December 13, 2013. The crew shot interior scenes for the film in an old residence in Toronto. Exterior shots were filmed on the West Mountain of Hamilton.

== Release ==
On August 6, 2014, the film's release date was shifted from February 13, 2015, to July 24, 2015. On March 4, 2015, the date was shifted again to when it was previously set for release alongside Spy. It was released in 3D.

=== Marketing ===
The film's first trailer was released on February 5, 2015. Forrest Wickman of Slate Magazine's opinion was that the trailer made the film appear to be too similar to the original film. James Hibberd of Entertainment Weekly said that the trailer "retains and amplifies several elements from the original", and praised that "the modernizing doesn’t result in, say, the family’s daughter being kidnapped by ghosts in Snapchat". Brad Miska of Bloody Disgusting stated that "while every fiber of my being wants to reject it, [the film] actually looks pretty insane", and praised the trailer's final shot. Ben Kuchera of Polygon also opined that the trailer appeared to be similar to the original film, but that it "looks great, as a horror movie".

=== Home media ===
Poltergeist was released on DVD, Blu-ray Disc and Blu-ray 3D on September 29, 2015. The Blu-ray editions included an extended cut of the film.

== Reception ==
=== Box office ===
Poltergeist grossed $47.4 million in the United States and Canada and $48.2 million in other territories for a worldwide total of $95.6 million against a budget of an estimated $35 million.

In the United States and Canada, Poltergeist made $1.4 million during its Thursday night showings from 2,500 theaters, and an estimated $9.4 million on its opening day. Through its first three-day opening, it grossed $22.6 million from 3,240 theaters, debuting at fourth place at the box office behind Tomorrowland, Pitch Perfect 2 and Mad Max: Fury Road. In comparison to prior horror film reboots, its opening is well below the openings of 2009's Friday the 13th ($40.6 million), 2010's A Nightmare on Elm Street ($32.9 million), 2003's The Texas Chainsaw Massacre ($28.1 million), and right below 2005's The Amityville Horror ($23.5 million).

Outside the United States and Canada, it grossed $8.3 million on its opening weekend from 3,750 screens in 36 countries, finishing in sixth place at the international box office, including $2.2 million in the United Kingdom, where it opened in third place, and $2 million in Brazil.

=== Critical response ===
On Rotten Tomatoes, the film has a rating of 29% based on 138 reviews and an average rating of 4.81/10. The site's consensus reads: "Paying competent homage without adding anything of real value to the original Poltergeist, this remake proves just as ephemeral (but half as haunting) as its titular spirit." On Metacritic, the film has a score of 47 out of 100 based on 27 critics, indicating "mixed or average reviews". Audiences polled by CinemaScore gave the film an average grade of "C+" on an A+ to F scale.

Writing for Variety, Andrew Barker called it "generally entertaining yet fundamentally unnecessary" and concluded: "Even when one is inclined to admire the cleverness with which the remake revisits and reincorporates Poltergeist's themes, it’s hard to pinpoint a single moment where it improves on them, and the aura of inessentiality hangs thick over the proceedings". Neil Genzlinger gave the film a mostly positive review in The New York Times, writing: "The new Poltergeist might well be the scariest movie 13-or-unders have yet seen, just as the original was for their parents back in 1982. Those parents might find it an enjoyable trip down memory lane, even if they do now recognize it as largely a well-served collection of horror-movie tropes". Eddie Goldberger echoed that sentiment in The New York Daily News, writing: "It doesn't approach the original--really, how could it? But the new Poltergeist is a fun, worthy horror entry." Tirdad Derakhshani wrote in The Philadelphia Inquirer: "It's not exactly a scary film, but it does provide an enjoyable ride. It's good fun. But it left me befuddled", adding: "Why would anyone want to remake Poltergeist in the first place?". Writing in The Daily Telegraph, Mike McCahill called the film "an efficient scare-machine". Bilge Ebiri wrote in New York: "This new Poltergeist isn't anything special... But it's not a travesty, and that feels like cause for brief celebration".

Other critics took a more skeptical view of the film. Writing a review for The Village Voice, Alan Scherstuhl stated: "Poltergeist 2015 is to Poltergeist '82 what today's shipped-frozen-to-the-store Pizza Hut dough is to the kneaded-on-site pies the chain's stoned cooks tossed in the Reagan era. It's the same kind of thing, with the same shape and some shared ingredients, but the texture's gone limp, and there's no sense of occasion about it, and there's some unpalatable goop stuffed in the crust. In a pinch, it beats pizzalessness — but just barely." Linda Cook wrote in The Quad City Times: "The Poltergeist remake is OK, but won't stay with you." Randy Cordova in The Arizona Republic wrote: "Ultimately, the whole affair is forgettable."

== Future ==
In April 2019, it was announced that the Russo brothers would produce a new reboot of the franchise.
