= Christina's House =

2000 film by Gavin Wilding

- Promotional poster
- Directed by: Gavin Wilding
- Written by: Stuart Allison
- Produced by: Tracey Boyd
- Starring: Allison Lange; Brendan Fehr; Brad Rowe; John Savage
- Distributed by: Metro-Goldwyn-Mayer
- Release date: March 17, 2001
- Running time: 97 minutes
- Country: Canada
- Language: English

Christina's House is a 2000 Canadian independent horror-thriller film directed by Gavin Wilding, and starring Allison Lange, Brendan Fehr, Brad Rowe, and John Savage. Its plot follows a teenaged girl who experiences bizarre occurrences in her new home. The film was executive produced by Mark Victor and Michael Grais, the screenwriters of Poltergeist (1982).

== Plot ==
Christina Tarling is a teenager, who moved from Los Angeles, California to a small town in Avendon, Washington with her father, James and younger brother Bobby to be closer to Joanne, Christina's mother who due to her mental state, was placed into a psychiatric hospital in Avedon. Christina is shown to be a popular student and due to his work commitments, James is most of the time out of the house, giving Christina the opportunity to spend time with her boyfriend Eddy, who James is not fond of. Over the few days that follow, Christina begins to notice bizarre occurrences happening related to her home, particularly the attic to which their Handyman, Howie is constantly inspecting and repairing the faults in the house.

Sheriff Mark Sklar is investigating and searching for a missing girl, he then questions Christina, Bobby, and Christina's friend Karen about the girl. Michelle, a classmate of Christina and Eddy's ex-girlfriend, who dislikes Christina, is sent a note allegedly by Eddy that he broke up with Christina and to meet him at outside Christina's house. Outside of Christina's house, Michelle hears a male voice coming from the woods claiming to be Eddy but is unseen. Michelle is then pulled behind a tree by the unseen person, where the sound of her neck snapping is heard. Days after, Christina, Karen, and Bobby discover Michelle's decomposing and dismembered body in a river outside the house.

Eddy begins to grow jealousy towards Howie and his bond with Christina which leads Eddy to physically assaulting him. On her 17th birthday, James plans a surprise party with Eddy and all her friends in attendance. During the party Eddy and Christina sneak away into the attic and try to get intimate but not before James catches them. After an argument between James and Christina, James notices a gift, away from all the others, he opens it only to find a dead rat caught on a mousetrap inside. Startled, James leaves the party. Karen, upstairs, hears noises coming from the attic and goes to investigate and is then dragged away by an unseen man.

After visiting her mother, Christina begins to suspect that James might have had something to do with her mother's condition to which he denies. Christina begins to hear noises around the house including finding a Boombox playing. Christina tries to exit the house with Bobby but realizes they are trapped inside. Eddy arrives at the house and soon after tries to break the windows but fails. Howie emerges from the attic and reveals he's the one behind all the occurrences under Joanne's orders of "protecting" Christina who he met at the psychiatric hospital when he was a patient.

Eddy attempts to stand his ground, but Howie overpowers him with one hand and murders him by impaling the side of his head with a maul, then giving chase to Christina. James arrives at the house but falls into a modified trap rigged with circular saw blades, severely wounding him. Howie catches Christina and takes her to the attic where he has the bodies of Karen and the missing girl the sheriff is searching for. James, having escaped the trap, intervenes but is stabbed by Howie. Christina and Bobby set the same trap used on James, then lure Howie out causing him to fall into the trap. Christina then pushes a dresser into the trap, crushing Howie to death.

James, having survived, is now in the hospital recovering with Christina and Bobby by his side. After a brief conversation with sheriff Sklar, Christina and Bobby decide to walk home. At psychiatric hospital, a newly released patient notice Joanne sitting in a distance. Joanne starts chanting, using the same method she had used on Howie to control him. She displays an evil smile at him as he leaves the building. Later that evening the lights in the attic at Christina's house turn on, indicating the man has assumed Howie's former role.

== Cast ==
- Allison Lange as Christina Tarling
- Brendan Fehr as Eddy Duncan
- Brad Rowe as Howie Rhodes
- John Savage as James Tarling
- Lorne Stewart as Bobby Tarling
- Crystal Bublé as Karen
- Jerry Wasserman as Sheriff Mark Sklar
- Chilton Crane as Joanne Tarling
- Sigrid M. Spade as Michelle
