= Sharbino =

Sharbino is a surname. Notable persons with that name include:

- Brighton Sharbino (born 2002), American actress
- Saxon Sharbino (born 1999), American actress, sister of Brighton
