= Zelda Rubinstein =

American actress and human rights activist

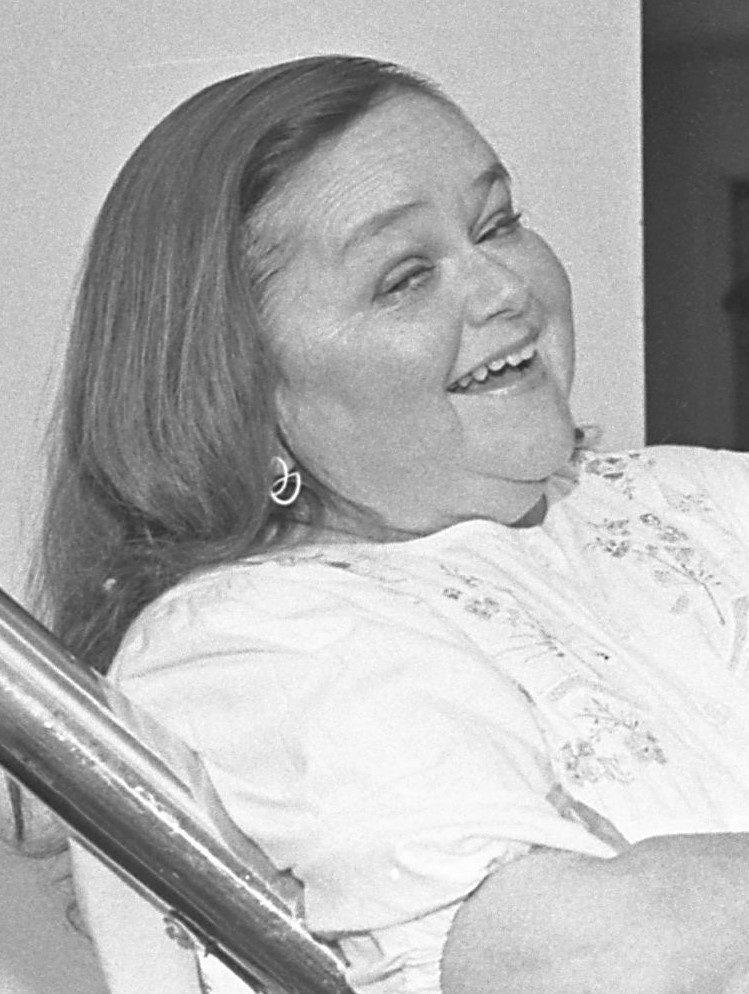
- Rubinstein in 1985
- Born: Zelda May Rubinstein; May 28, 1933; Pittsburgh, Pennsylvania, US
- Died: January 27, 2010 (aged 76); Los Angeles, California, US
- Education: University of Pittsburgh: University of California, Berkeley
- Occupations: Actress, human rights activist
- Years active: 1978–2010

Zelda May Rubinstein (May 28, 1933 – January 27, 2010) was an American actress and human rights activist, known as eccentric medium Tangina Barrons in the Poltergeist film series. Playing "Ginny", she was a regular on David E. Kelley's Emmy Award-winning television series Picket Fences for two seasons. She also made guest appearances in the TV show Poltergeist: The Legacy (1996), as seer Christina, and was the voice of Skittles candies in their long-running "Taste the Rainbow" ad campaign. Rubinstein was also known for her outspoken activism for little people and her early participation in the fight against HIV/AIDS.

Zelda Rubinstein and Heather O'Rourke were the only cast members to have appeared in all three Poltergeist films.

== Early life, family and education ==
Rubinstein was born in Pittsburgh, Pennsylvania, on May 28, 1933, to Dolores and George Rubinstein, Jewish immigrants from Poland. She was the youngest of three children.

She was the only one with dwarfism in her family. Her stature was due to a deficiency of the anterior pituitary gland, which produces growth hormone. Rubinstein did not become comfortable with her short stature until she was an adult. In a 1992 interview with the Chicago Sun-Times, Rubinstein told the newspaper that she "had a rough childhood, [but] I became very verbally facile ... I learned to meet everyone head-on." In adulthood at her tallest, she stood 4 ft 3 in (1.30 m) tall Commenting in 2002 on the challenges of being a little person, Rubinstein said, "Midgets are societally handicapped. They have about two minutes to present themselves as equals—and if they don't take advantage of that chance, then people fall back on the common assumption that 'less' is less."

Rubinstein won a scholarship to the University of Pittsburgh, where she earned her bachelor's degree in bacteriology and became a sister of the national sorority Phi Sigma Sigma. At age 25, she continued her studies at the University of California, Berkeley, where she also studied acting.

== Career ==
Rubinstein in the film Poltergeist II: The Other Side

Rubenstein worked as a medical laboratory technician at blood banks. However, in 1978, she decided to pursue an acting career. She studied acting at the University of California. Poltergeist was her first major film role.

Film critic Pauline Kael, who essentially dismissed Poltergeist as an "entertaining hash", held special praise for Rubinstein's portrayal of the psychic Tangina, saying she "gives the movie new life and makes a large chunk of it work." Rubenstein remained active in film and television thereafter, frequently portraying various psychic characters, such as her appearance on Jennifer Slept Here. She also narrated the horror television series Scariest Places on Earth, which aired in the US on ABC Family and in Canada on YTV.

Rubinstein's other film roles included Sixteen Candles, Under the Rainbow, Cages, Teen Witch, The Wildcard, Southland Tales and National Lampoon's Last Resort. She also contributed voice-over work for TV including Hey Arnold!, and The Flintstones. She made numerous guest appearances on network TV shows, including Caroline in the City, Martin, Mr. Belvedere, and had a recurring role as sheriff's assistant Ginny Weedon in the TV series Picket Fences. Her character there was killed off in typical offbeat fashion, by falling into a freezer early in the third season. She also appeared in an episode of Tales From The Crypt in which she played the mother of a girl who has been dead for 40 years. She also starred in two different roles on Santa Barbara in 1984 and in 1990.

Beginning in 1999, she performed voiceovers for television, starting with the Fox Family reality TV show Scariest Places on Earth over its multiple seasons. This was followed by work in commercials promoting movies such as Lady in the Water and products including Skittles candy. Her last film role came in 2007 when she made a cameo appearance in the horror film Behind the Mask: The Rise of Leslie Vernon. She also appeared in a cameo as herself at the Revenge of the Mummy ride in Universal Studios Florida on the screens which shows various actors from the films warning the people to leave, telling them about the curse of Imhotep.

== Human rights and activism ==
Rubinstein was an advocate for "the rights of little people (the term she preferred)." She was a founding member of the Michael Dunn Memorial Repertory Theater, (Note: The group was named to honor the little person actor known for his role as villain Dr. Loveless in the 1960s television adventure series The Wild Wild West and Glocken in the 1965 feature film Ship of Fools) started in 1981. The theater group's tallest performer was 4 ft 6 in (1.37 m).

Additionally, she became active in the fight against HIV/AIDS in 1984. She appeared in a series of advertisements, directed towards gay men specifically, promoting safer sex and AIDS awareness. Rubinstein did so at risk to her own career, especially so shortly after her rise to fame, and admitted later that she did "pay a price, career-wise." "I lost a friend to AIDS, one of the first public figures that died of AIDS," the actress said in an interview with The Advocate. "I knew it was not the kind of disease that would stay in anybody's backyard. It would climb the fences, get over the fences into all of our homes. It was not limited to one group of people." She attended the first AIDS Project Los Angeles AIDS Walk.

== Personal life and death ==
Rubinstein lived in London for several years when she worked as a laboratory technician. After returning to the US, she lived in the Greater Los Angeles, California, area for many years.

Rubinstein died in Los Angeles on January 27, 2010. She was 76 years old. Eric Stevens, Rubinstein's agent of four years, said the actress never recovered from a mild heart attack several months earlier, which he said had left her a patient at Barlow Respiratory Hospital in Los Angeles. "She had several pre-existing conditions that she had been dealing with for years, and unfortunately they began to overtake her," Stevens said. Stevens also said that at Rubinstein's request, no funeral would be held.

== Filmography ==
=== Films ===
List of film credits
Year	Title	Role	Notes
1979	Americathon	Act	
1981	Under the Rainbow	Iris	
1982	Poltergeist	Tangina Barrons	Saturn Award for Best Supporting Actress
1982	Frances	Mental Patient	Credited as Zelda Rubenstein
1983	A Chip of Glass Ruby	Daughter	
1984	Sixteen Candles	Organist	
1986	Poltergeist II: The Other Side	Tangina Barrons	Nominated-Golden Raspberry Award for Worst Supporting Actress
1987	Anguish	Alice Pressman, the Mother	Alternative title: Angustia
1988	Poltergeist III	Tangina Barrons	Nominated-Saturn Award for Best Supporting Actress; Nominated-Golden Raspberry Award for Worst Supporting Actress
1989	Teen Witch	Madame Serena Alcott	
1991	Guilty as Charged	Edna	
1994	National Lampoon's Last Resort	Old Hermit	Alternative titles: Last Resort, National Lampoon's Scuba School
1995	Timemaster	Betting Clerk	
1995	Lover's Knot	Woman in Clinic	
1996	Little Witches	Mother Clodah	
1997	Mama Dolly	Mama Dolly	
1997	Critics and Other Freaks	Theatre Director	
1998	Sinbad: The Battle of the Dark Knights	Princess Shalazar	
1999	Frank in Five	Waitress	
2000	Maria & Jose	Doctor	
2002	Wishcraft	Medical Examiner	
2004	The Wild Card	Mrs. Stanfield	Direct-to-DVD release
2005	Cages	Liz	
2005	Angels with Angles	Zelda the Angel	
2006	Unbeatable Harold	Bunny	
2006	Southland Tales	Dr. Katarina Kuntzler	
2006	Behind the Mask: The Rise of Leslie Vernon	Mrs. Collinwood	Cameo
2014	Strange Matters	Agnes Sampson	Posthumous release (final film role)

List of television credits
Year	Title	Role	Notes
1980	The Flintstone Comedy Show	Atrocia Frankenstone (Voice)	1 episode
1983	Jennifer Slept Here		1 episode
1983	Matt Houston	Flower Girl	1 episode
1984	Whiz Kids	Madame Zerleena	1 episode
1984	Santa Barbara	Mental Patient	1 episode
1986	ABC Weekend Special	Ralph's Mother	1 episode
1987	The Tortellis		1 episode
1987	Faerie Tale Theatre	Old Woman	1 episode
1987	Reading Rainbow	Herself (Voice)	1 episode
1987	Sable	Sister Glory	1 episode
1990	Santa Barbara	Gladys Bittleworth, ghost psychic	5 episodes
1990	Mr. Belvedere	Murphy	1 episode
1991	Darkwing Duck	Darkwing Duck's Mother / Negaduck's Mother	1 episode
1991	The Gambler Returns: The Luck of the Draw	Butterfingers O'Malley	Television movie
1992	Stormy Weathers	Rosamund	Television movie
1992	Goof Troop	Madame Zeldarina	1 episode
1992	Tales from the Crypt	Nora	1 episode
1992–1994	Picket Fences	Ginny Weedon	44 episodes
1993	Acting on Impulse	Nosy Lady	Television movie
1996	Poltergeist: The Legacy	Christina	1 episode
1997	Martin	Nurse Froyd	1 episode
1997	Chock 2 - Kött	Mother	Television movie
1998	Caroline in the City	Phyllis	1 episode
1999	Hey Arnold!	Patty's Mother (Voice)	1 episode
2000	The Pretender	Pawn shop lady	1 episode
2000–2006	Scariest Places on Earth	Narrator	41 episodes
2001	The Flintstones: On the Rocks	Dr. Schwartzen Quartz (Voice)	Television movie
