= Jingle All the Way 2 =

- Official DVD cover
- Directed by: Alex Zamm
- Written by: Stephen Mazur
- Based on: Jingle All the Way by Randy Kornfield
- Produced by: Alan C. Blomquist; Michael J. Luisi; Vicki Sotheran; J. P. Williams
- Starring: Larry the Cable Guy; Santino Marella; Brian Stepanek; Kennedi Clements; Kirsten Robek
- Cinematography: Barry Donlevy
- Edited by: Heath Ryan
- Music by: Chris Hajian
- Production companies: 20th Century Fox; WWE Studios
- Distributed by: 20th Century Fox Home Entertainment
- Release date: December 2, 2014
- Running time: 93 minutes
- Country: United States
- Language: English
- Budget: $5 million

Jingle All the Way 2 is a 2014 American direct-to-video Christmas comedy film, and a stand-alone sequel to the 1996 film Jingle All the Way starring Arnold Schwarzenegger. Directed by Alex Zamm, the film stars Larry the Cable Guy and Santino Marella, and is produced by 20th Century Fox and WWE Studios, the motion picture division of WWE, and was released straight-to-video by Fox on December 2, 2014. On-air promotion from WWE occurred on its weekly episode events. Like the first film, it received negative reviews from critics.

== Plot ==
Truck driver Larry Phillips competes with the current husband of his former wife, the wealthy businessman Victor, for eight-year-old daughter Noel's affection. Larry tries to find out what Noel wants most by secretly opening her letter to Santa Claus after offering to mail it for her.

He then tries to buy what he believes is her heart's desire—a Harrison the Talking Bear toy, which also happens to be the toy of the season. However, Noel's new stepfather, Victor, sends his employee Welling to spy on Larry and find out what Noel wants, so that he can be the one to make her wishes come true. Determined to stop Larry, Victor has Welling buy every Harrison Bear he can find, sabotaging Larry’s efforts each time he tries to get one.

Victor stockpiles all of the bears he acquires in a room in his box company. Larry tricks Victor into giving away the location of the bears and follows him into the room where they are kept but accidentally locks them both in.

At the tree lighting ceremony in town, a savvy female reporter has investigated who bought all the bears (Welling) and outs him to all the parents at the ceremony who have tried to buy one for their child. She declares Victor as the true villain which causes the crowd to focus their anger against Victor and his box company instead of him.

Meanwhile, inside the box company, Larry and Victor have discovered what is going on and finally come together to save the situation. They decide to have Christmas together and give Noel the prized toy from both of them, only to find out Noel never wanted the toy at all. They question her not wanting the toy and point out it was in her letter to Santa Claus. Noel accuses Larry of betraying her trust regarding the letter, which Larry makes an excuse for finding and reading the letter which he then produces; the letter, to his and Victor's surprise, when correctly interpreted, says something completely different from what he had thought: she wanted her family all together as one.

== Cast ==
- Larry the Cable Guy as Larry Phillips
- Brian Stepanek as Victor Baxter
- Santino Marella as Claude
- Kennedi Clements as Noel Phillips
- Kirsten Robek as Trish Phillips-Baxter
- Rachel Hayward as Maggie
- Matty Finochio as Jeffrey
- Eric Breker as Nate Welling
- Brenda Crichlow as Reporter Margo Price (Brenda M. Crichlow)
- Alex Zamm as Harrison Bear (voice)
- David Milchard makes an uncredited cameo in this film.

== Production ==
=== Filming ===
Jingle All the Way 2 was filmed in Fort Langley, British Columbia, Canada.

== Reception ==
=== Critical response ===
Dave Schilling of Vice wrote, "What's actually insidious about the whole endeavor is that it's so good at being so bad." Gavin Jasper of Den of Geek wrote, "In the end, Jingle All the Way 2 is about as bad as you’d expect it to be. The humor is beyond weak and any redeeming parts of the story (such as the last fifteen minutes) are offset by the never-ending series of incidents where Larry tries to find that doll. But you know what? If given the choice between watching this again and watching the Schwarzenegger version? Yeah, I think I’d rather get ‘er done."

In 2017, critic Nathan Rabin called the film "just barely a movie" and possibly "too sappy and maudlin for its target demographic."

== See also ==
- List of Christmas films
