= Marked for Death =

1990 action film directed by Dwight H. Little

- Theatrical release poster
- Directed by: Dwight H. Little
- Written by: Michael Grais; Mark Victor
- Produced by: Michael Grais; Steven Seagal; Mark Victor
- Starring: Steven Seagal; Joanna Pacula; Keith David
- Cinematography: Ric Waite
- Edited by: O. Nicholas Brown
- Music by: James Newton Howard
- Production company: Steamroller Productions
- Distributed by: 20th Century Fox
- Release date: October 5, 1990
- Running time: 93 minutes
- Country: United States
- Language: English
- Budget: $12 million
- Box office: $58 million

Marked for Death is a 1990 American action film directed by Dwight H. Little. The film stars Steven Seagal as John Hatcher, a former DEA troubleshooter who returns to his Illinois hometown to find it taken over by a posse of vicious Jamaican drug dealers led by Screwface. Using a combination of fear and Obeah, a Jamaican syncretic religion of West African and Caribbean origin similar to Haitian vodou and Santería, Screwface attempts to control the drug trade in Lincoln Heights.

== Plot ==
DEA Agents John Hatcher and his partner Chico pursue a drug dealer called Hector on foot, who, it is later revealed, has blown John's cover. John and Chico manage to fight their way out of an ambush set up by Hector, but during their escape, Chico is shot and mortally wounded by a woman. In response, Hatcher shoots several rounds through the wall where she is hiding, hitting and killing her. As they flee, Chico dies of his injuries.

John retires from the DEA and returns home to Chicago, where he is reunited with his former US Army colleague, Max Keller, now a football coach for the local school, who is disturbed by the presence of Jamaican drug dealers, known as Posse. Later, at a bar, a gunfight breaks out between the same dealers and local gangsters. John manages to assist in arresting one of the Jamaicans, and an FBI agent asks him to join the case, but he refuses. At the scene, a detective finds a symbol that an expert, Leslie Davalos, identifies as a religious icon marking the crimes of a man called Screwface.

Screwface sends some men to do a drive-by at John's sister's house (where he is staying), and they wound his niece Tracey. John interrogates a gangster he saw in the club shootout called Jimmy Fingers, but he refuses to help, and John is forced to kill him. One of Screwface's men, Nesta, who is Jimmy's accomplice, arrives and gives a small clue about Screwface before throwing himself out of a window. Upon returning to his sister's house, John finds the same symbol on a rug, along with a cow tongue and a black cross nailed to the door. Leslie informs him that such symbols mark the person for death, and John demands that the FBI provide protection for his family.

During a call with his sister, she is attacked again by Screwface's men in an attempt to ritually sacrifice her. John rushes home and arrives just in time to save her, as Screwface flees. Having now realized what he is up against, John enlists Max's help, and they trail some members of the Posse to a park, and a chase ensues, ending in a high-end jewelry store. John and Max kill several gang members, but don't learn anything about Screwface. However, Screwface ambushes John that night, trapping his car between two construction vehicles and setting fire to it with a Molotov cocktail, with John just managing to escape.

Charles Marks, a Jamaican detective working with the FBI, reaches out to John and Max and offers his help. Together, they acquire new weapons and go to Jamaica, where Screwface is thought to have fled. With the help of a local who introduces them to a woman associated with Screwface, the team gets their break when John learns from her that Screwface has two heads and four eyes. The trio descends on Screwface's complex during a party, and John uses an explosive device to distract the guards and cut the power. Max and Charles open fire on the Posse while John infiltrates the house. He is captured and prepared for a ritual sacrifice by Screwface, but escapes his bonds and manages to behead Screwface in a sword fight.

They return to Chicago and present Screwface's head and sword to the remaining loyal gang members in order to intimidate them into disbanding. However, Screwface's twin brother appears behind Charles and impales him. The posse, believing Screwface has been resurrected, opens fire at the trio. Despite his injury, Max provides cover while John eliminates more Posse members before facing Screwface's twin, who admits responsibility for all the Posse crimes in the United States. After a lengthy fight, John manages to blind the twin before breaking his back and throwing him down an elevator shaft, killing him.

As the surviving gang members discover the twins' bodies before their eventual arrest, John and Max leave the crime scene with Charles' body in tow.

== Cast ==
- Steven Seagal as DEA Agent John Hatcher
- Keith David as Max Keller
- Joanna Pacuła as Professor Leslie Davalos
- Basil Wallace as "Screwface"
  - Wallace also portrays Screwface's Twin Brother
- Tom Wright as Detective Charles Marks
- Kevin Dunn as FBI Agent Sal Roselli
- Elizabeth Gracen as Melissa Hatcher
- Bette Ford as Kate Hatcher
- Danielle Harris as Tracey Hatcher
- Al Israel as Tito Barco
- Richard Delmonte as DEA Agent Chico
- Arlen Dean Snyder as DEA Agent Duvall
- Victor Romero Evans as Nesta
- Michael Ralph as "Monkey"
- Danny Trejo as Hector
- Tom Dugan as Paco
- Gary Carlos Cervantes as Richard "Little Richard"
- Joe Renteria as Raoul
- Jeffrey Anderson-Gunter as "Nago"
- Peter Jason as DEA Assistant Director Pete Stone
- Stanley White as Sheriff O'Dwyer
- Earl Boen as Dr. Stein
- Rita Verreos as Marta, Voodoo Priestess
- Tracey Burch as Sexy Girl #1
- Teri Weigel as Sexy Girl #2
- Jimmy Cliff as Himself

== Production ==
Steven Seagal had wanted to hire director Dwight Little for his second feature, Hard to Kill, but studio Warner Bros. vetoed his choice, and went with Bruce Malmuth instead. According to Little, Seagal had the option in his contract with Warner to do one film with another studio. Seagal chose to exercise that option and make his third film at 20th Century Fox, where he demanded that they hire Little for Marked for Death. "I got that job only because Steven insisted," said Little. During production, the studio was pushing for more humor in the film, but Little and Seagal had made a pact to resist these attempts. Their template for the film was The French Connection.

On the third day of shooting Marked for Death, Hard to Kill came out in theaters. Dwight Little: "It opened huge, and it stayed on top for a while. No one, including Steven, thought that was going to be success. But it was. Frankly, just based on his charisma and a couple of good action scenes. I was downtown shooting a scene for Marked for Death when suddenly I see all these limos and towncars coming to the set. They were all CAA-agents and producers, coming out of the woodwork to see the next big action guy. They all wanted to talk to him."

Of Seagal's martial arts, Little said: "Steven is the only guy who does what he does in the movies, where you let your opponent's energy go past you. In that respect, he's totally unique. But it's not a forward, high kicking, punching thing. That's why I felt I needed action movie stuff, like car chases, gun fights, explosions and some old fashioned cop stuff. Because if we tried to string together a bunch of Steven's fights, they will quickly start to feel the same."

== Music ==
A soundtrack containing hip hop, reggae, and R&B music was released on September 27, 1990, by Delicious Vinyl.

== Reception ==
=== Box office ===
Marked for Death opened at number one at the U.S. box office with an opening weekend gross of $11,790,047, making it Seagal's second straight film to open #1. It remained at #1 for three weekends. It earned a little more than $46 million domestically and $58 million worldwide.

=== Critical response ===
Rotten Tomatoes, a review aggregator, reports that 25% of 12 surveyed critics gave the film a positive review; the average rating is 4/10. Metacritic, which uses a weighted average, assigned the film a score of 49 out of 100, based on 14 critics, indicating "mixed or average" reviews. Audiences polled by CinemaScore gave the film an average grade of "A-" on an A+ to F scale. Both The New York Times and The Washington Post gave it a thumbs up, writing that it was another solid Seagal action film. In a less than favorable response from Entertainment Weekly, they wrote that the film is partially "undone by murky cinematography". The Chicago Tribune was very critical of the film.
