= Trust Me (2013 film) =

- Directed by: Clark Gregg
- Written by: Clark Gregg
- Produced by: Keith Kjarval; Aaron L. Gilbert; Mary Vernieu; Clark Gregg; Brad Grenier; Raju Hariharan; Akshaii Hariharan
- Starring: Clark Gregg; Felicity Huffman; Allison Janney; William H. Macy; Niecy Nash; Amanda Peet; Sam Rockwell; Molly Shannon; Saxon Sharbino; Paul Sparks
- Cinematography: Terry Stacey
- Edited by: Kathryn Himoff
- Music by: Mark Kilian
- Production companies: Unified Pictures; Amberdale Productions; Bron Studios; Savage Bunny; Visionary Pictures; IAM Entertainment
- Distributed by: Starz Distribution
- Release dates: April 20, 2013 (Tribeca Film Festival); June 14, 2014 (United States)
- Running time: 90 minutes
- Country: United States
- Language: English

Trust Me is a 2013 American comedy-drama film written and directed by Clark Gregg and starring Gregg, Amanda Peet, Sam Rockwell, and Saxon Sharbino. It debuted at the Tribeca Film Festival in April 2013 and entered limited theatrical release in the United States in June 2014.

== Plot ==
Howard Holloway is a former child star and now a down-and-struggling agent who specializes in representing child actors. He has an ongoing feud with more successful agent Aldo Stankas who has poached several of Howard's clients who were on the verge of success.

After losing a client, Howard encounters the highly talented thirteen-year-old Lydia who takes a liking to him. Her crude father Ray has the opposite reaction and orders Howard to stay away from his daughter.

Howard arranges a date with his neighbor Marcy. Soon after, Lydia receives an offer to audition for the lead role in a forthcoming big-budget series of films based on a popular series of young adult vampire novels. Lydia tells the producers that Howard is her agent and he negotiates a lucrative deal for her. Lydia later stands by Howard when her father and the producers attempt to dump him in favor of Aldo.

While rehearsing lines with Lydia before the audition, Howard is shocked by her angry reaction when he attempts to touch her arm. Later he goes to the hotel room she shares with her father to deliver some contracts and sees Lydia sitting on the bed sobbing, while Ray takes a shower. Howard comes to the horrifying conclusion that Ray is sexually abusing Lydia.

Howard talks the situation over with Marcy who knows a lawyer specializing in family law. He worries that an attempt to remove Lydia from her father will be unsuccessful and result in the scuttling of the film deal, thus losing her the money she would need to gain her independence.

Howard ultimately decides to try to save Lydia and hires a lawyer to petition for her emancipation. Ray objects but Howard accuses him of molesting Lydia. He denies the accusation, saying that Lydia was abused by a former agent while she was in her mother's custody. Ray agrees to allow the emancipation in order to avoid charges of molestation.

On the day of the press conference to announce the movie's cast, Howard discovers that Lydia has left his apartment where she had been staying. Heading to the conference at Grauman's Chinese Theatre, Howard discovers Lydia, now dressed in a highly sexualized fashion with Aldo as her new manager.

Lydia explains that she needed to be rid of her father whose drunken behavior had cost her a previous role. She implies that she lied about her father and confirms Ray's story about her being abused by a former agent. Howard tells her that he doesn't know what to believe anymore.

As they enter the theater, Ray tries to break through the security cordon. While struggling with the guards he grabs one of their guns, inadvertently shooting Howard. Lydia and Marcy cradle him as he lays dying and Howard imagines himself sprouting wings and taking flight like one of the characters in the movie.

== Cast ==
- Clark Gregg as Howard Holloway
- Amanda Peet as Marcy Watkins
- Sam Rockwell as Aldo Stankis
- Saxon Sharbino as Lydia
- Paul Sparks as Ray
- Allison Janney as Meg Waldron
- Felicity Huffman as Agnes Dieter
- William H. Macy as Gary
- Niecy Nash as Angie
- Griffin Gluck as Phillip Trilby
- Molly Shannon as Janice Trilby
- Danielle Macdonald as Delia
