= Poltergeist II: The Other Side =

1986 film by Brian Gibson

- Theatrical release poster
- Directed by: Brian Gibson
- Written by: Michael Grais; Mark Victor
- Based on: Characters by Steven Spielberg
- Produced by: Michael Grais; Mark Victor
- Starring: JoBeth Williams; Craig T. Nelson; Heather O'Rourke; Oliver Robins; Julian Beck; Zelda Rubinstein; Will Sampson; Geraldine Fitzgerald
- Cinematography: Andrew Laszlo
- Edited by: Thom Noble
- Music by: Jerry Goldsmith
- Production companies: Metro-Goldwyn-Mayer; Freddie Fields Productions; Grais-Victor Productions
- Distributed by: MGM/UA Entertainment Co. (United States); United International Pictures (international)
- Release date: May 23, 1986
- Running time: 91 minutes
- Country: United States
- Language: English
- Budget: $19 million
- Box office: $75 million

Poltergeist II: The Other Side (also known simply as Poltergeist II) is a 1986 American supernatural horror film directed by Brian Gibson. JoBeth Williams, Craig T. Nelson, Oliver Robins, Heather O'Rourke and Zelda Rubinstein reprised their roles from the first film. New cast members include Will Sampson, Julian Beck and Geraldine Fitzgerald. The second entry in the Poltergeist film series and a direct sequel to Poltergeist (1982), it follows the Freeling family who again finds themselves under attack from the supernatural forces led by "the Beast", revealed to be the spirit of insane preacher Henry Kane who led an apocalyptic cult during the 19th century, attempting to claim their daughter. In their efforts to save their daughter Carol Anne, the family finds help in Taylor, a Native American shaman.

Neither director Tobe Hooper nor producer Steven Spielberg returned for this film. Michael Grais and Mark Victor, who co-wrote the previous film with Spielberg, served as writer and producer here. Filming of Poltergeist II took place in California and Arizona in the spring of 1985. Most of the original cast members returned with the exception of Dominique Dunne, who was murdered shortly after the first film's release in 1982. The film marked the final appearance of Julian Beck, who died on September 14, 1985, as well as the last to be released during Heather O'Rourke's lifetime before her death in February 1988 just four months before her final appearance in the third Poltergeist film, Poltergeist III which was released in June that year. Surrealist artist H. R. Giger designed the creatures featured in the film.

Released in the spring of 1986, Poltergeist II: The Other Side was a financial success, earning nearly $75 million worldwide. Critical reviews were negative, but the film nevertheless followed its predecessor with a nomination for the Academy Award for Best Visual Effects, as well as two Saturn Awards.

== Plot ==
The Cuesta Verde neighborhood is turned into an archaeological dig centered on the spot where the Freelings' home stood. (Note: The film is set one year after the events of the first film.) The excavation leads to the discovery of a cave. Its existence is revealed to psychic Tangina Barrons, who informs her friend Taylor, a Native American shaman. After investigating the cave for himself, Taylor realizes that the spirit of Rev. Henry Kane, an insane preacher whom he has seen in dreams, is after Carol Anne Freeling and goes to defend her.

The Freeling family has relocated and now live in a house with Diane's mother, Jess. Grandma Jess is highly clairvoyant, and believes that Diane and Carol Anne possess the same abilities. Jess later dies from natural causes, but not before telling Diane one last time that she will always "be there" if she needs her.

Taylor shows up as Kane begins his first assault on the home. Unable to get in through the television, as the family has removed all television sets from the house, Kane's minions are forced to find another way in, this time through Carol Anne's toy telephone. The attack fails, and the family gets out of the house quickly. Taylor introduces himself and convinces them that running would be a waste of time since Kane would only find them again, and they return to the house.

Kane shows up at the home one day in human form and demands to be let in, but Steven refuses. Taylor congratulates him for resisting Kane, then takes Steven to the desert and gives him the "Power of Smoke", a Native spirit that can repel Kane. Tangina visits the house and helps Diane to understand Kane's history and how he became the Beast that is now stalking the family. Diane turns out to be unique in that she is one of the only people on earth who have been to the spirit world while living. Diane has visions of Kane in the mid-19th century when he was the head of an apocalyptic cult. Kane led his followers through the desert and into the cave, because he believed that the end of the world was coming, but then kept them trapped and captive there to slowly die with him after the day of his prediction came and went. Because he was so deranged and evil, Kane became a monster after death and controls the souls of his followers. Taylor warns the family that Kane is extremely clever and will try to tear them apart.

With Taylor having left, the family's morale drops. Steven lets his guard down and gets drunk, swallowing a Mezcal worm that is possessed by Kane, who then temporarily possesses him. The possessed Steven tries to rape Diane, who cries out that she loves him, weakening Kane's hold. Steven then vomits up the possessed worm, which grows into a huge, tentacled monster. In this form, Kane attacks Steven from the ceiling, but he uses the smoke spirit to send him away. The Beast launches another assault before the family flees. The Freelings decide to confront the Beast on his own turf, the Other Side.

The Freelings return to Cuesta Verde and, with Tangina and Taylor, enter the cavern below their former home, where Kane pulls Diane and Carol Anne over into the Other Side. Steven and Robbie jump in after them through a fire started by Taylor. On the Other Side, which appears as a place of floating limbos without the sense of direction, Steven, Diane, Robbie and Carol Anne unite, but the now monstrously transformed Kane grabs Carol Anne and begins to drain her life force. Carol Anne is saved after Taylor puts a charmed Native spear into Steven's hands, and Steven stabs Kane with it, defeating the monster. Carol Anne nearly crosses over into the afterlife, but Jess' spirit appears and guides her back to the family. The Freelings then return safely and thank Taylor and Tangina.

Steven later gifts the family car to Taylor after he had expressed affection for it previously, and Taylor drives away with Tangina. After the Freelings realize that they now have no ride home, they chase after Taylor.

== Cast ==
- JoBeth Williams as Diane Freeling
  - Jaclyn Bernstein as Young Diane
- Craig T. Nelson as Steve Freeling
- Heather O'Rourke as Carol Anne Freeling
- Oliver Robins as Robbie Freeling
- Zelda Rubinstein as Tangina Barrons
- Will Sampson as Taylor
- Julian Beck as Reverend Henry Kane
- Geraldine Fitzgerald as Gramma Jess
  - Kelly Jean Peters as Young Jess

== Production ==
Several scenes that appeared in press stills or promotional posters were cut from the finished film, including one in which Tangina Barrons (Zelda Rubenstein) confronts Reverend Henry Kane (Julian Beck) when he tries to enter the house, and another in which Steven (Craig T. Nelson) and Diane Freeling (JoBeth Williams) see a flying toaster during a breakfast scene.

=== Casting ===
The majority of the central cast of the original Poltergeist reprised their roles, including Nelson and Williams as parents Steven and Diane Freeling, as well as Heather O'Rourke and Oliver Robins as Carol Anne and Robbie, respectively. Dana, the eldest daughter of the Freeling family, was intended to appear in a sequence while away at college, but the sequence was scrapped as Dominique Dunne, the actress who portrayed her in the original film, had been murdered in 1982. Rubinstein also reprised her role as Tangina Barrons, the psychic who assisted the Freelings in the original film. Williams commented that she was skeptical of making a sequel, but became convinced upon reading the screenplay. Beatrice Straight was asked to reprise the role of Dr. Martha Lesh from the first film, but she was ill and not willing to work at the time. Richard Lawson was also asked to reprise the role of Dr. Ryan Mitchell, but his schedule clashed with MGM because he was busy filming the TV movie Under the Influence (1986) with Andy Griffith and Keanu Reeves. Stage veteran Beck was brought in to play the film's major antagonist, Reverend Henry Kane.

=== Filming ===
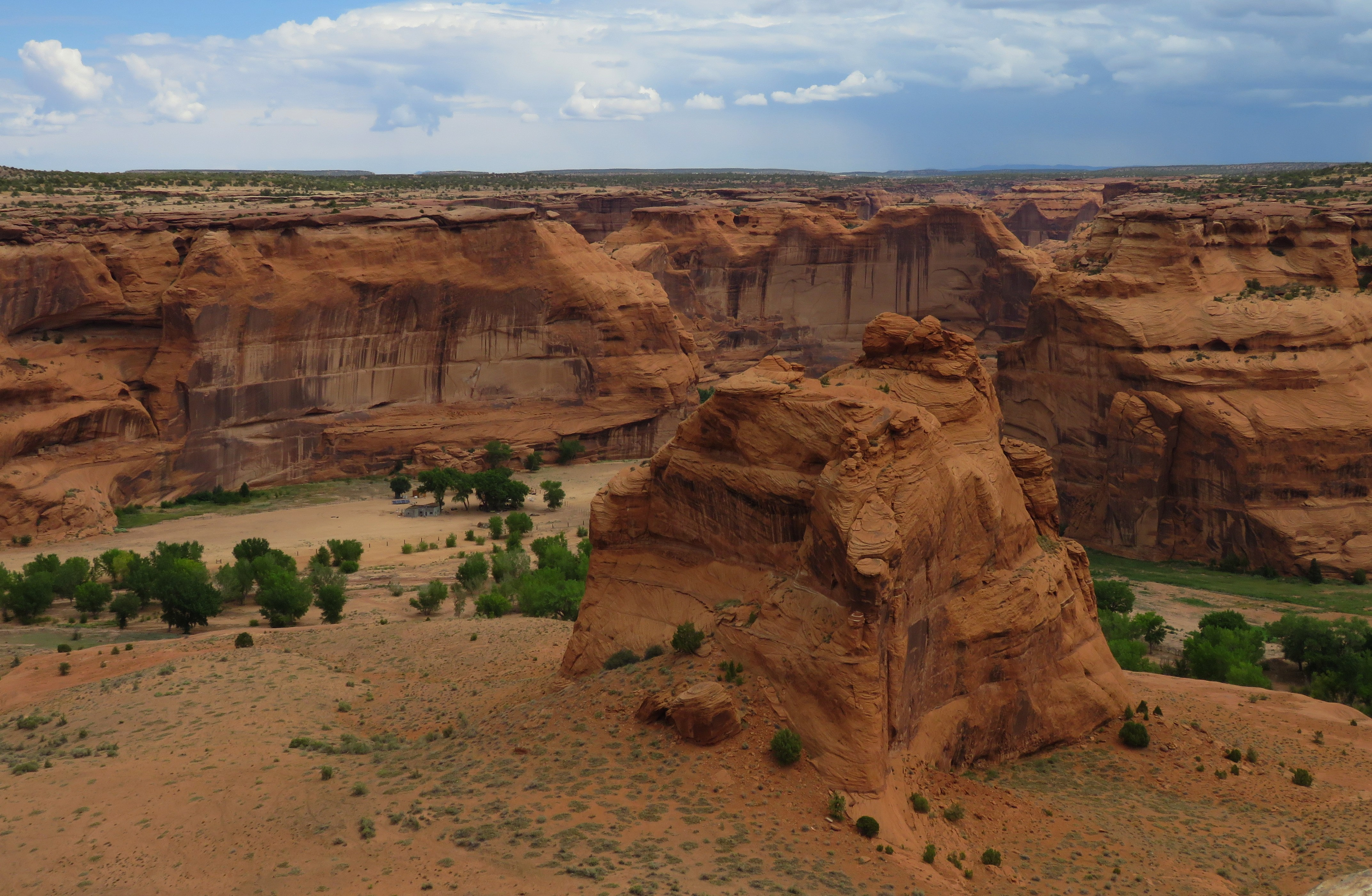
The Canyon de Chelly National Monument in Arizona appears in the film's opening sequence

Principal photography of Poltergeist II began in May 1985 in Los Angeles. The original production schedule spanned 64 days. A private residence in Altadena, California, served as Gramma Jess (Geraldine Fitzgerald)'s Phoenix home, while tract homes in Encino served as a stand-in for the Cuesta Verde neighborhood. The opening desert scenes featuring Taylor (Will Sampson) involving the Hopi obelisk were filmed at the Canyon de Chelly National Monument in Chinle, Arizona.

For interior sequences that required elaborate effects, replicas of the Altadena residence were constructed on Stage 30 of the MGM Studios in Culver City, California. The studio's Stage 27 was used to construct the desert sweat lodge visited by Steve and Taylor characters, as well as the cavern in which the film's finale takes place. Commenting during the shoot, Williams said: "It hasn't been as physical as the first film. We don't have as much mud and goo; there is more of the sort of psychological terror, although certainly there will be a lot of effects."

==== Special effects ====
Swiss surrealist artist H. R. Giger was commissioned by Metro-Goldwyn-Mayer to create several designs for the film, specifically the "Great Beast" manifestation of Kane that appears in the astral plane during the film's finale. Because Giger did not want to leave Zurich for long periods of time, his colleague Cornelius De Fries was hired to represent Giger at the studio during production.

Giger was ultimately disappointed with the result, later attributing the failure to his lack of presence. "When the movies eventually came out I thought, 'Oh shit.' But I couldn't change it," said Giger. "There was no more time. So I thought that was the wrong way to work. If you work on a film you have to be there all the time and be always looking at what they're doing otherwise they'll do what they want." Only two of Giger's designs appear in the final cut of the film, including "The Great Beast" version of Kane.

=== Post-production ===
After actor Julian Beck's death, voice actor Corey Burton was brought in during post-production to loop some of his lines.

=== Music ===
The musical score for Poltergeist II: The Other Side was composed and conducted by Jerry Goldsmith, who had written the Academy Award-nominated soundtrack to the first film, and performed by the Hollywood Studio Symphony. Though "Carol Anne's Theme" returns from the first film's soundtrack, the score for The Other Side consists of mostly new material blending traditional orchestral elements with new electronic sounds. The soundtrack album has been released five times: through Intrada Records and Varèse Sarabande in 1986, Intrada in 1993, a deluxe edition by Varèse Sarabande in 2003, a 2-CD set from Kritzerland in 2013, and a 3-CD set from Intrada Records in 2018.

== Release ==
=== Home media ===
MGM/UA Home Video released Poltergeist II on VHS in November 1986. It was released on DVD on August 26, 2003, in a double feature collection along with Poltergeist III. To date there has been no standalone DVD release of the film in Region 1. On September 13, 2011, MGM released the film on Blu-ray. MGM has also released the film on DVD in Region 2 and Region 4. It was released in the UK on October 23, 2000, and in Australia on September 1, 2006. A double feature pack containing Poltergeist II and III together was released in Region 4 on November 8, 2010.

On January 31, 2017, Scream Factory released a Blu-ray Collector's Edition of the film including new commentaries and featurettes. Poltergeist II: The Other Side was released by Scream Factory on 4K UHD Blu-ray on August 27, 2024.

== Reception ==
=== Box office ===
Released theatrically on May 23, 1986, Poltergeist II grossed $40,996,665 at the United States and Canadian box office. Internationally it grossed $33.9 million for a worldwide total of $74.9 million.

=== Critical response ===
Nina Darnton of The New York Times wrote that "the movie, like most sequels, has no reason for existing beyond the desire to duplicate a financial success. There are no hanging threads left over from the first tightly woven script that can be pulled out and reworked. Instead, the film seems like a string of special effects held together by a far-fetched storyline with an unsatisfying sticky-sweet ending." Variety stated, "Script has enough humorous breaks and high-wire moments to make up for some of the expository sections in the dialog. While the payoff is a bit weak and less tension-filled than would be expected considering what the Freeling family has just endured, tech credits from beginning to end look like they cost a mint, and filmmakers probably figured they had to stop somewhere." Gene Siskel of the Chicago Tribune gave the film 1 star out of 4 and wrote that director Brian Gibson "simply runs the family through a maze of Indian rituals, ghostly vapors, and astral projections. Lots of sound and fury signifying you know what." Michael Wilmington of the Los Angeles Times stated, "The trappings of Poltergeist II are fairly effective: Jerry Goldsmith contributes another eerie score, and H. R. Giger (Alien) has dreamed up some loathsome monsters ... But the second film never has the hardness or urgency of the first." Paul Attanasio of The Washington Post wrote, "There are movies that make you want to mince words, and then there's Poltergeist II: The Other Side, a movie so ineffably bad, you can't even find the words to mince."

As of November 2021, the film holds a 20% rating on Rotten Tomatoes based on 54 reviews. The site's consensus reads: "They're back, but this hollow sequel retains none of the charm or suspense that made the original Poltergeist such a haunting specter".

=== Accolades ===
Year	Institution	Category	Recipient	Result	Ref.
1987	Academy Awards	Best Visual Effects	Richard Edlund, John Bruno, Garry Waller and Bill Neil	Nominated	
1987	Saturn Awards	Best Horror or Thriller Film	Poltergeist II: The Other Side	Nominated	
1987	Saturn Awards	Best Special Effects	Richard Edlund	Nominated	
1987	Golden Raspberry Award	Worst Supporting Actress	Zelda Rubinstein	Nominated	
1987	Young Artist Awards	Best Young Actress in a Film	Heather O'Rourke	Nominated	

== Novelization ==
The novelization, titled Poltergeist II: The Other Side, was written by James Kahn and published by Ballantine Books in 1986. The cover features an image similar to the film's poster.

The book also better explains many of the unexplained things in the film. The older sister Dana is said to be away at college. There is a better establishment of the psychic powers in Carol Anne, Diane and Gramma Jess, which is what attracts Kane.

The absence of Dr. Lesh is explained. Tangina spent time post the first film exploring the plane between worlds and encountered Kane. She reached out to Lesh in her dreams who was drawn in and died. Making Tangina's guilt over her failure double. Thus Tangina reached out to Taylor for assistance. Taylor was a descendant of a former member of Kane's cult that left before they sealed themselves in the cavern. Thus explaining his connection and inside knowledge of Kane.

== Legacy ==
The television advertisement featured what would become the catchphrase "They're ba-aaack". Anecdotal evidence suggests that this is what popularized use of the phrase even decades later.

== See also ==
- Poltergeist (franchise)
- List of ghost films
