= Surviving: A Family in Crisis =

1985 television film

- 1993 VHS box cover retitled Tragedy. Although Zach Galligan was Molly Ringwald's leading man in the film, by 1993 River Phoenix had eclipsed Galligan's stardom, and was given top billing (as well as a photograph obviously taken several years after the film), to promote the VHS release.
- Genre: Drama
- Written by: Joyce Eliason
- Directed by: Waris Hussein
- Starring: Zach Galligan; Molly Ringwald; Ellen Burstyn; Len Cariou; Marsha Mason; Paul Sorvino; River Phoenix; Heather O'Rourke
- Theme music composer: James Horner
- Country of origin: United States
- Original language: English

Production
- Executive producers: Frank Konigsberg; Larry Sanitsky
- Producer: Hunt Lowry
- Production locations: Bone and Joint Hospital - 1111 N. Dewey, Oklahoma City, Oklahoma; Lake Hefner Dam, Oklahoma City, Oklahoma; Piedmont, Oklahoma; Village Baptist Church - 10600 N. May Avenue, The Village, Oklahoma
- Cinematography: Alexander Gruszynski
- Editors: Leslie Dennis Bracken; Kurt Bullinger; John F. Burnett
- Running time: 138 minutes
- Production companies: Telepictures; Warner Bros. Television

Original release
- Network: ABC
- Release: February 10, 1985

Surviving: A Family in Crisis (also known simply as Surviving, and later released on VHS as Tragedy) is a 1985 ABC television film. Directed by Warris Hussein and starring Zach Galligan, Molly Ringwald, Ellen Burstyn, Len Cariou, Marsha Mason, Paul Sorvino, River Phoenix and Heather O'Rourke, the film is described as a modern-day Romeo & Juliet story that examines the tragedy of teen suicide, and the loved ones left behind to pick up the pieces.

== Plot ==
Rick Brogan is the apple of his father's eye—smart, handsome, and idolized by his younger siblings Philip and Sarah. By stark contrast, Lonnie Carson is a troubled and withdrawn girl, struggling to put the painful memory of a suicide attempt behind her. Both teenagers are dealing with loneliness and family pressures when they begin to find solace in each other, and a young romance develops. As Rick and Lonnie's bond begins to grow stronger, and they become increasingly withdrawn from their friends and families, their protective parents begin to worry that the young lovers are becoming too involved and grow increasingly uncomfortable with the teenagers' relationship. Finally, when Rick's parents Tina and David decide that Lonnie is a bad influence on their son, and Lonnie's parents Lois and Harvey decide that boarding school would be the best place for their troubled daughter, Rick and Lonnie, desperate not to be separated, make a tragic decision to take their own lives. In the wake of the young lovers' fatal suicide pact, the two devastated families are left to try and pick up the pieces of their shattered lives and must somehow find a way to go on.

== Cast ==
Actor	Role
Zach Galligan	Rick Brogan
Molly Ringwald	Lonnie Carson
Ellen Burstyn	Tina Brogan
Len Cariou	David Brogan
Marsha Mason	Lois Carson
Paul Sorvino	Harvey Carson
River Phoenix	Philip Brogan
Heather O'Rourke	Sarah Brogan
William Windom	Dr. Madsen
Marc Gilpin	Bobby
Paddi Edwards	Alma
Camila Ashland	Woman #1
Jane Simoneau	May
Joe Berryman	Sheriff
Lon Coggeshall	Jed
Midge Woolsey	Helen
Sandra Gilpin	Woman #2
David C. Allen	Kid
Kim Valentine	Sherry
Robert Douglas Scott	Artie
Regina Johnson	Supervisor
Norma Moore	Psychologist
Barry Brawley	Kid

== Awards ==
Year	Award	Category	Recipient(s)	Result	Ref.
1984–1985	Young Artist Awards	Best Family Television Special	Surviving	Nominated	
1984–1985	Young Artist Awards	Best Young Actress in a Television Special or Mini-Series	Heather O'Rourke	Nominated	
1984–1985	Young Artist Awards	Best Young Actor in a Television Special or Mini-Series	River Phoenix	Won	
1985	Humanitas Prize	90-Minute Category	Joyce Eliason	Nominated	
1986	Artios Award	Best Casting for TV Movie of the week	Marsha Kleinman; Kathleen Letterie	Nominated	

== Reception ==
The initial airing of the film brought in an 18.1 rating and a 26 share, ranking third in its timeslot, and ranking 23rd out of 66 programs aired that week.

== Novelization ==
A novelization of the film was written by Elizabeth Faucher and published by the Scholastic Corporation.
