= Kennedi Clements =

Canadian actress (born 2007)

- Born: January 21, 2007 (age 19); White Rock, British Columbia, Canada
- Occupation: Actress
- Years active: 2010–present
- Notable work: Poltergeist (2015)
- Height: 175 cm (5 ft 9 in)
- Family: Tatum (sister); Lochlan (brother)

Kennedi Clements (born January 21, 2007) is a Canadian actress. She is best known for portraying Madison Bowen in the 2015 remake of Poltergeist and Noel in Jingle All the Way 2.

== Early life ==
Kennedi is the eldest child of three. She resides in Chilliwack and performed as a dancer in Street Kings Academy of Dance (SK) and Project Dance Chilliwack (PDC). In the fall of 2023, she joined Studio North as a member in Youngside and Apex.

== Personal life ==
Kennedi is the eldest sister of Tatum (born 2009) and brother Lochlan (born 2011).

== Filmography ==
=== Film ===
Year	Title	Role	Notes
2013	Coming Home for Christmas	Samantha	Direct to video
2013	Wer	Peter's Sister	Uncredited
2014	Jingle All the Way 2	Noel Phillips	Direct to video
2015	Poltergeist	Madison Bowen	
2019	Giltrude's Dwelling	Young Giltrude	Short

=== Television ===
Year	Title	Role	Notes
2010	A Family Thanksgiving	Amy	TV film
2011	V	Jennifer Hartswell	Episode: "Uneasy Lies the Head"
2012	It's Christmas, Carol!	Emma	TV film
2013	Twist of Faith	Sarah Fisher	TV film
2013	Motive	Little Girl	Episode: "Pushover"
2013	Eve of Destruction	Lena	2 episodes
2013	Rogue	Ruby	4 episodes
2015	Wayward Pines	Jenny	Episode: "Choices"
2016	Second Chance	Lisa	Episode: "One More Notch"
2019	World of Dance (TV series)	Dancer	Episode: "The Qualifiers 1"
2019	Pup Academy	Jen	7 episodes
2020	A Million Little Things	Dancer	Episode: " The Kiss"
