= Michael Grais =

American screenwriter (born 1943)

Michael Grais (born February 28, 1943) is an American screenwriter, best known as the co-writer of Poltergeist (1982).

He has also produced such movies as Great Balls of Fire! (1989, executive producer), Marked for Death (1990) and Sleepwalkers (1992).

== Biography ==
After attending Emerson College, N.Y.U. Film School and the University of Oregon, Grais set out for Los Angeles, where he began a TV writing career, starting with a job at Baretta, before eventually moving into feature films in partnership with Mark Victor, a friend from grade school. Grais and Victor's first two scripts, an unproduced comedy called Turn Left And Die and the action film Death Hunt, brought them to the attention of Steven Spielberg.

From his association with Spielberg, Grais co-wrote Poltergeist. Its success led to a sequel, Poltergeist II, which Grais co-wrote and produced. He then co-wrote and executive produced the TV pilot Visitors From the Unknown for CBS and executive-produced the film Great Balls of Fire!, starring Dennis Quaid as Jerry Lee Lewis.

In 1990, he co-wrote and produced Marked for Death starring Steven Seagal. In 1992, he produced Steven King’s Sleepwalkers, and co-wrote Cool World for director Ralph Bakshi. In 2000, he executive-produced Who Killed Atlanta's Children? for Showtime. Grais also oversaw production on the syndicated series The Immortal.

Grais, a wild horse advocate, took a sabbatical from Hollywood in 2001 to move with his wife, singer/songwriter Jennifer Grais, to San Miguel de Allende, Mexico, for three years and begin writing the novel Christa's Luck, a YA novel that was published in 2015. In 2015 the remake of his Poltergeist screenplay was produced for MGM. After Mexico, the couple moved to Taos, New Mexico, with their horse Solo, the inspiration for their novel which they continued to write. Grais continued to write commercial screenplays for a slate of ready-to-produce projects for his new company Graisland Entertainment. In 2010, Grais moved back to Northern California where he was an uncredited script doctor on several big productions and developed two television series for streaming platforms but production was delayed due to the COVID epidemic. Crossfire Hurricane, an action comedy he co-wrote and will produce, is set to go into production in 2021 in New Orleans, Louisiana.

== Filmography ==
- Baretta (1975) (TV)
- Starsky and Hutch (1976) (TV)
- Kojak (1977) (TV)
- Death Hunt (1981)
- Poltergeist (1982)
- Poltergeist II: The Other Side (1986) (also Producer)
- Great Balls of Fire! (1989) (Executive Producer)
- Marked for Death (1990) (also Producer)
- UFO Abductions (1991) (TV) (Producer)
- Sleepwalkers (1992) (Producer)
- Cool World (1992)
- Christina's House (1999) (Executive Producer)
- Who Killed Atlanta's Children? (2000) (TV) (Executive Producer)
- The Immortal (2001) (TV)
- Deception (2001) (Producer)
- Lakeshore Drive (2006) (Director/Executive Producer)
- Behind the Wall (2008) (Producer)
- The Death of Reason (2009) (Director)
- Danny and the Deep Blue Sea (2018) (Director of theatrical production)
