= Poltergeist III =

1988 film by Gary Sherman

- Theatrical release poster
- Directed by: Gary Sherman
- Written by: Gary Sherman; Brian Taggert
- Based on: Characters by Steven Spielberg
- Produced by: Barry Bernardi
- Starring: Tom Skerritt; Nancy Allen; Heather O'Rourke; Zelda Rubinstein
- Cinematography: Alex Nepomniaschy
- Edited by: Ross Albert
- Music by: Joe Renzetti
- Production company: Metro-Goldwyn-Mayer
- Distributed by: MGM/UA Entertainment Co. (United States); United International Pictures (international)
- Release date: June 10, 1988
- Running time: 98 minutes
- Country: United States
- Language: English
- Budget: $9.5 million
- Box office: $14.1 million

Poltergeist III is a 1988 American supernatural horror film co-written and directed by Gary Sherman, and starring Tom Skerritt, Nancy Allen, Heather O'Rourke and Zelda Rubinstein with the latter two reprising their roles from the previous films. The third and final entry in the original Poltergeist film series, it follows young Carol Anne Freeling, who is terrorized by malicious spirits while staying in her aunt Pat and uncle Bruce's apartment at Chicago's John Hancock Center.

Released on June 10, 1988, the film marked O'Rourke's final performance, as she died four months before its release at the age of 12. Her death resulted in marketing complications for the film's studio, Metro-Goldwyn-Mayer, who did not want to exploit the tragedy. The film earned negative reviews from critics and was a box-office bomb, earning $14.1 million against a $9.5 million budget.

== Plot ==
The Freeling family has sent Carol Anne away from her native California to live with Diane's wealthy sister Pat and her husband Bruce Gardner in Chicago. Carol Anne has been told she is living with her aunt and uncle temporarily to attend a unique school for gifted children with emotional problems, though Pat thinks it is because Steven and Diane just wanted Carol Anne out of their house. Pat and Bruce are unaware of the events that the Freeling family had endured, only noting that Steven was involved in a bad land deal. Along with Donna, Bruce's daughter from his previous marriage, they live in the John Hancock Center of which Bruce is the manager.

Carol Anne has been made to discuss her experiences by her teacher/psychiatrist, Dr. Seaton, who believes she is delusional. The constant discussion enables the evil spirit of Rev. Henry Kane to locate Carol Anne and bring him back from the limbo he was sent during his previous encounter with her. Kane drains the high rise of heat and begins appearing in mirrors. Not believing in ghosts, Dr. Seaton has come to the conclusion that Carol Anne is a manipulative child with the ability to perform mass hypnosis, making people believe they were attacked by ghosts. Also, during this period, Tangina Barrons realizes that Kane has found Carol Anne and travels cross-country to protect her.

That night, Kane takes possession of reflections in mirrors, causing the reflections of people to act independently of their physical counterparts. When Carol Anne is left alone that night, Kane attempts to use the mirrors in her room to capture her, but she escapes with the help of Tangina, who uses telepathy to tell Carol Anne to break the mirror. Donna and boyfriend Scott sneak into the security office while the guard is away, intending to make sure he sees only a videotape of the swimming pool and not see the swimming pool while their friends are there. On one of the monitors, they see a frightened Carol Anne running through the high rise's parking lot and go to rescue her. Yet before they can, all three are taken to the Other Side through a puddle by Kane and his people. By this point, Tangina and Dr. Seaton are both at the high rise, along with Pat and Bruce. Dr. Seaton stubbornly assumes that Carol Anne has staged the entire thing, while Tangina tries to get her back.

Scott is seemingly released from the Other Side through the pool (which appears frozen, at first) and is taken to his home with his parents. Tangina is killed by Kane disguised as Carol Anne; and Donna later reappears by bursting out of Tangina's corpse. As Dr. Seaton attempts to calm Donna, Bruce sees Carol Anne's reflection in the mirror and chases after her while Pat follows. Dr. Seaton is not far behind, and he believes he sees Carol Anne in the elevator. After Dr. Seaton approaches the elevator doors, Donna appears behind him and pushes him to his death down the empty elevator shaft. At this point it is revealed that what came back was not Donna, but a ghost under Kane's control, which then vanishes back into the mirror with a ghost imposter of Scott at its side.

Even in death, Tangina is more powerful than Kane expects. She returns long enough to give Pat and Bruce her necklace and an important piece of advice. Pat and Bruce struggle to find Carol Anne, but Bruce is captured and eventually Pat is forced to prove her love for Carol Anne in a final face-off against Kane. Tangina then appears and manages to convince Kane to go into the light with her. Donna, Bruce and Carol Anne are then returned to Pat (with the exception of Scott), leaving the other side. In the end, lightning flashes over the building and Kane's evil laughter is heard, hinting that Kane may not be gone for good.

== Cast ==
- Heather O'Rourke as Carol Anne Freeling
- Tom Skerritt as Bruce Gardner
- Nancy Allen as Patricia Wilson Gardner
- Lara Flynn Boyle as Donna Gardner
- Zelda Rubinstein as Tangina Barrons
- Richard Fire as Dr. Seaton
- Kipley Wentz as Scott
- Nathan Davis as Reverend Henry Kane
  - Corey Burton as Reverend Henry Kane (voice, uncredited)
- Meg Thalken as Deborah
- Alan Wilder as Observer
- Laura Koppel Extra (Carol Anne's Double)
- Lynn Koppel Extra (Donna Gardner's Double)

== Production ==
=== Development ===
Writer-director Gary Sherman drafted the original screenplay of Poltergeist III with screenwriter Brian Taggert, whom he had worked with on Wanted: Dead or Alive (1987). Sherman thought the idea of the city setting was just as scary as isolated suburbia. His feeling was that "there are people on the other side of the wall, and no one cares that you are in trouble". Additionally, Sherman was influenced by Lewis Carroll's Alice novel Through the Looking-Glass, which served as a framework for the film's narrative, specifically the use of mirrors as a plot device. Development of the film was announced in November 1986.

=== Casting ===
Tom Skerritt was cast in the film as Bruce Gardner, a Chicago apartment building manager, while Nancy Allen was cast as Pat, Bruce's wife and the aunt of Carol Anne Freeling who becomes her temporary guardian. Heather O'Rourke and Zelda Rubinstein reprised their roles from the previous two films (as Carol Anne and Tangina Barrons, respectively) the only cast members to do so. At the time of filming, O'Rourke had been undergoing treatment for a diagnosis of Crohn's disease, which required cortisone injections; this left her with facial swelling, which was evident in the film. Corey Burton returned to provide the voice work for Reverend Henry Kane, although he was uncredited for this effort. Craig T. Nelson was asked to play Steve Freeling again but declined saying two was enough.

=== Filming ===
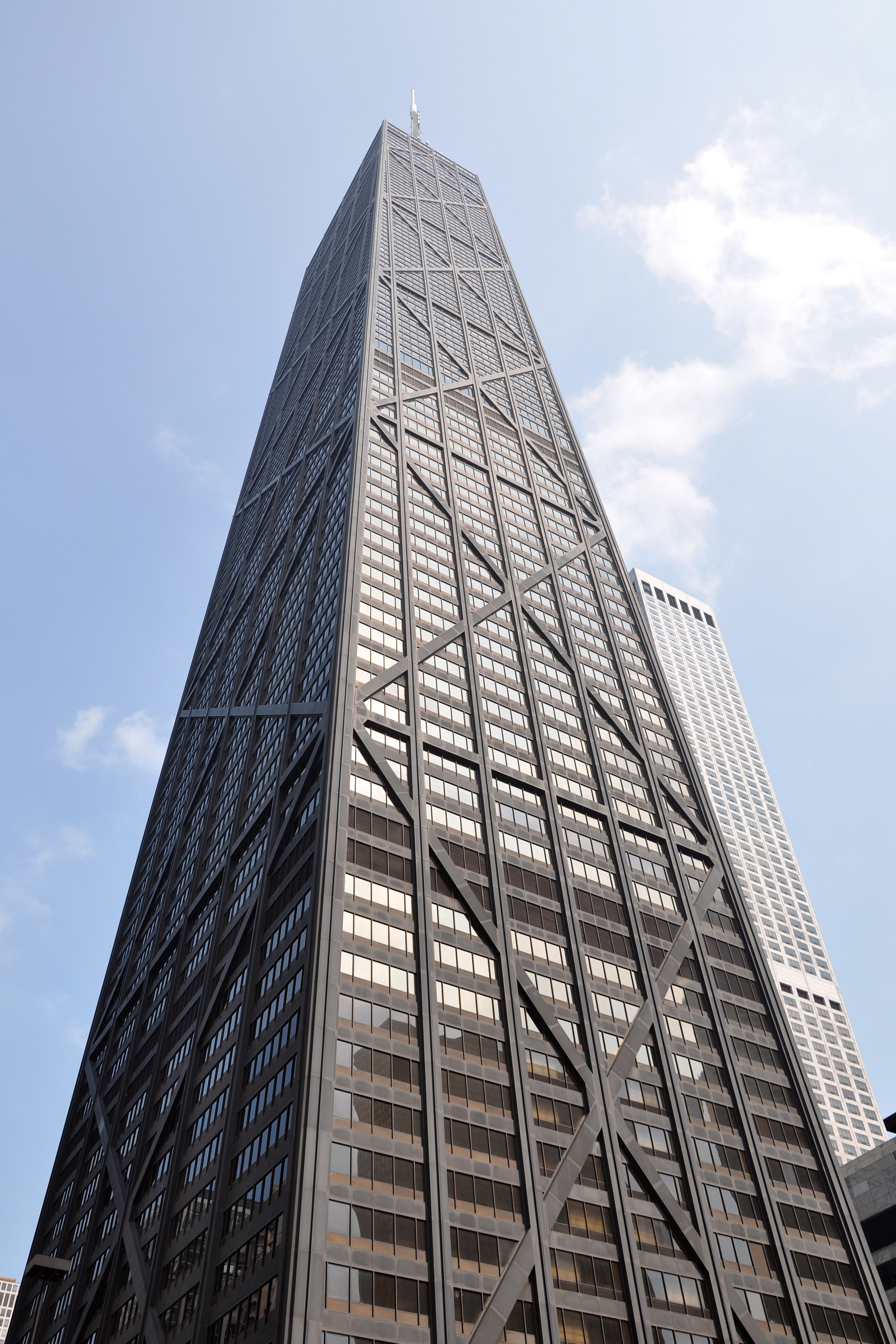
The John Hancock Center served as a primary filming location

Principal photography of Poltergeist III began on April 6, 1987, and ended in June. Filming occurred throughout Chicago. The John Hancock Center served as the central high-rise building location, while additional photography occurred at the George Wellington Center, and the Francis W. Parker School, which stood in for Donna Gardner (Lara Flynn Boyle)'s high school. Additional non-location filming took place at Metropolitan Chicago Studios.

According to Nancy Allen, one of the earliest scenes she filmed was the finale sequence in which she and Skerritt's characters Pat and Bruce attempt to scale the building on a window cleaning platform. The sequence was filmed on a real platform and required the actors to stand on the platform approximately 100-stories high. Because of recurrent budgetary restrictions that arose during the shoot, director Sherman was forced to make unexpected alterations to his and Taggert's original screenplay.

==== Special effects ====
Unlike the previous films, nearly all of the special effects were live and were performed on stage. The only visual effect added in post-production was the lightning flashing over the John Hancock Center in the very final shot of the picture. Sherman himself designed the special visual effects. On May 13, 1987, while filming the snow-covered parking garage sequence in Oakbrook Terrace's Mid America Plaza, a special effects explosion caused six polystyrene foam-covered cars to catch fire. A maintenance worker and two firefighters sustained injuries in the blaze, and the damage caused to the building was estimated at $250,000.

=== Post-production ===
At the time Poltergeist III began shooting in spring of 1987, Heather O'Rourke had been ill with flu-like symptoms and subsequently underwent medical treatment during parts of the filming. Principal photography for the movie lasted from April 13 to June 26 of that year, with June 10, 1988 as the film's scheduled release date. After O'Rourke completed filming, she returned home to California with her illness appearing to be in remission. In late January 1988, O'Rourke suddenly became ill again, her condition rapidly deteriorated, and she died on February 1, 1988 (barely a month after her 12th birthday) during Poltergeist III's post-production period.

After the completed film was rated PG by the MPAA in November 1987, Sherman and the studio decided to re-shoot at least part of the ending with a different special effects sequence. In the original ending that was scrapped after O'Rourke's death, when Patricia jumps through the glass pane into the apartment, she finds Carol Anne, Donna, Scott (Kipley Wentz), Bruce and Tangina frozen and dying. She then also becomes imprisoned in ice and gets attacked by Kane (Nathan Davis) and her evil mirror reflection who want the necklace. Patricia tries to repel them and declares unconditional love for her family, but trips over frozen Tangina and falls to the floor. Suddenly, Tangina frees her arm from the ice and grabs the necklace. She convinces Kane that she is the one who can take him to the other side, not Carol Anne. Kane puts his hand on the necklace, but instead of ascending, his face cracks and he explodes. The blast frees everyone, but annihilates Tangina and causes a violent thunderstorm. Patricia, Carol Anne, Donna, Scott and Bruce finally leave the mirror dimension. Carol Anne sees a reflection of a smiling Tangina in the mirror who waves at them and sheds a tear.

Planning and design for the new SFX make-ups took place between December 1987 and January 1988, with a possible shooting date set for early February. Following O'Rourke's death, Sherman did not want to complete the film, but pressure from the studio prevailed, and the entire ending was re-shot in March 1988 using a body double for O'Rourke, seven-year-old child actress Heather Holty. In April, a re-edited version of the film including the new ending was submitted to the MPAA, after which it received a PG-13 rating. The finished film proved to be a critical and box office failure. Sherman stated that in an interview decades later that it was still hard for him to watch the film.

== Release ==
Poltergeist III was released on June 10, 1988, in the United States. O'Rourke's death complicated MGM's marketing campaign for the film, out of fear of appearing to be exploiting her death. Skerritt and Allen were discouraged from giving interviews about the film to avoid questions about O'Rourke's death.

=== Home media ===
MGM released Poltergeist III on VHS on February 14, 1989.

MGM released Poltergeist II: The Other Side on DVD on August 26, 2003, in a double feature collection along with Poltergeist III. To date, there has been no standalone DVD release of the film in Region 1. On September 13, 2011, MGM released the film on Blu-ray.

On January 31, 2017, Scream Factory released a Blu-ray Collector's Edition of the film including new commentaries and featurettes and the original ending before it was reshot. The original ending was found among master negatives of the film and is accompanied by subtitles as the original audio track was lost. In the original ending, Pat confronts Kane among the frozen bodies of Bruce, Donna, Carol Anne and Tangina with the latter grabbing the magical amulet that vanquishes Kane. The final shot features the above cast mentioned as well as Scott, whose absence in the theatrical cut was never explained.

== Reception ==
=== Box office ===
Poltergeist III was the lowest grossing and least attended film in the Poltergeist trilogy. It opened at No. 5, making $4,344,308 on its opening weekend, averaging about $2,953 from 1,471 theaters. The film then fell out of the top 10 in its second weekend, dropping 52 percent to $2,093,783 (1,467 theaters, $1,427 average) ranking at No. 11, and bringing the 10-day cume to $8,165,286. Poltergeist III ended up with a domestic box office total of $14,114,488. The film sold 3.434 million tickets at 1988's ticket price of $4.11, compared with 25.410 million tickets for the first film, and 11.050 million tickets for the second film.

=== Critical response ===
Gene Siskel and Roger Ebert gave the film "two thumbs down" on their weekly syndicated show At the Movies. They were both annoyed by how frequently the film's characters cry out each other's names, particularly "Carol Anne". Ebert said that when he went to see the film, the audience in the theater also became annoyed at the tactic and started screaming back the names towards the screen. Janet Maslin of The New York Times wrote that "Gary Sherman, who directed and co-wrote the film, has no notion of creating a coherent universe through the looking glass. He is content with fiery or body-shattering effects, interspersed with irritating small talk and accidental humor." Variety stated, "Following the pattern set by his Poltergeist predecessors, director-co-writer Gary Sherman demonstrates absolutely no interest in whether this film ever has a modicum of meaning as he rushes from one special effect to another. Even there, Sherman arrives too late." Michael Wilmington of the Los Angeles Times called it "another sequel that seems to exist for no better reason than justifying its title and number ... The effects, which revolve around the conceit of a demonic mirror-world, are ingenious and cleverly executed. The acting plummets into realms of posturing camp, howling corn and eye-rolling hamminess that shatter illusion like a dropped glass."

Dave Kehr of the Chicago Tribune gave the film two stars out of four and praised the "nifty, how-did-they-do-that?" quality of the special effects, but went on to write, "Sherman gives it a shot, but he can't quite get the family tensions going that provided a psychological undercurrent for the supernatural events in Parts 1 and 2. The new characters are drawn thinly, and the old seem somewhat diminished." Hal Hinson of The Washington Post wrote, "Gary Sherman, the film's co-writer and director, has set up a showcase for scary effects, and some of them are rather nice, in a grisly sort of way. It's clear that Sherman knows how to engineer this sort of thing. What's also clear is that without some semblance of an actual movie around them, these pyrotechnics really start to get on your nerves."

As of May 2026, the film holds a 14% rating on Rotten Tomatoes based on 21 reviews. Metacritic, which uses a weighted average, assigned the film a score of 40 out of 100, based on 10 critics, indicating "mixed or average" reviews.

=== Accolades ===
Year	Association	Category	Recipient	Result	Ref.
1989	Golden Raspberry Awards	Worst Supporting Actress	Zelda Rubinstein	Nominated	
1990	Saturn Award	Best Supporting Actress	Zelda Rubinstein	Nominated	
