= Saxon Sharbino =

American actress

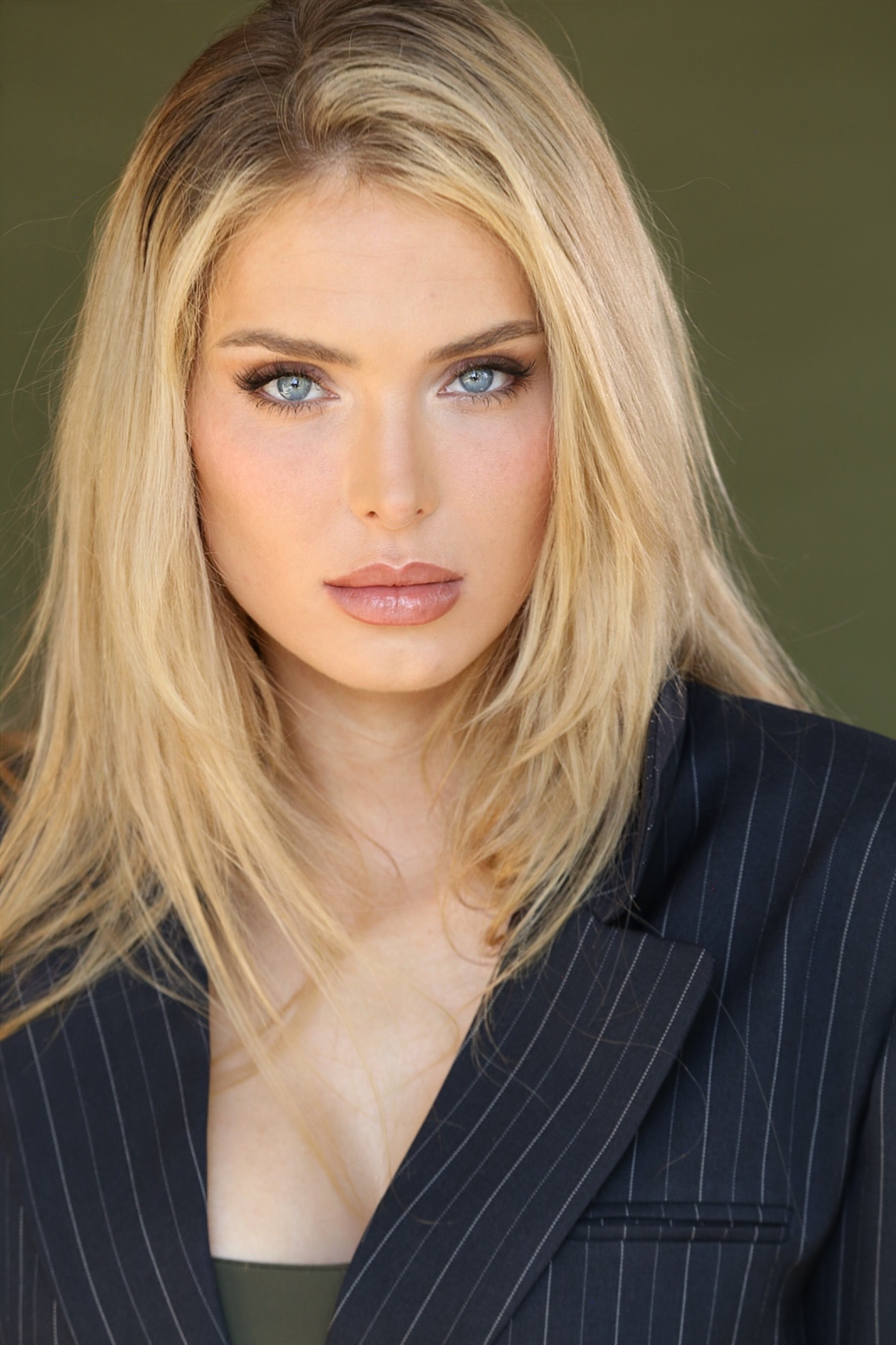
- Born: Lewisville, Texas, U.S.
- Occupation: Actress
- Years active: 2008–present
- Relatives: Brighton Sharbino (sister); Sawyer Sharbino (brother)

Saxon Sharbino is an American actress. She is known for portraying Amelia Robbins in the Fox series Touch and Kendra Bowen in the 2015 remake of Poltergeist.

== Early life ==
Sharbino was born in Lewisville, Texas, the daughter of Angela and Ron Sharbino. She began acting at the age of nine. Saxon is the older sister of actress Brighton Sharbino and singer/actor Sawyer Sharbino. Sharbino was homeschooled during her high school years.

== Career ==
Sharbino started acting at nine years old. Her first significant role was in the 2012 TV movie Rogue opposite Angela Bassett directed by Brett Ratner.

In 2013, Sharbino worked with Kiefer Sutherland in the TV series Touch. She did not have to audition for the role of Amelia Robbins; the producers gave her a direct offer for the role because she had been previously booked as the lead for a Fox pilot She and her family moved to Los Angeles, California for the role and to advance her career. Also in 2013, Sharbino starred with William H. Macy and Amanda Peet in Trust Me as Lydia. Sharbino stated that she learned a lot from director and star Clark Gregg, and the relationship that Macy and his wife Felicity Huffman had inspired her to take a more proactive role in Hollywood. Sharbino stated that she took the role of a young starlet who is manipulated by her father and sexually abused by a talent agent because she was drawn to the depth of the character.

In 2015, Sharbino played the teenage daughter Kendra in Poltergeist, a remake of the 1982 horror classic.

In 2016, Sharbino played Simone in the Netflix series Love.

In 2017, Sharbino was a series regular in the Hulu action horror series Freakish. Sharbino stated that she was drawn to the role of Anka, a manipulative "mean girl" with a soft side.

In 2017, Sharbino guest-starred as Savannah Ross in the Mood episode of Law & Order: Special Victims Unit.

Sharbino played high school student Sarah Pearson as a recurring role in Netflix 's American Vandal, which was released in 2017.

== Filmography ==
=== Film ===
Year	Title	Role	Notes
2010	Red White & Blue	Ed's Daughter	
2010	Earthling	Young Joy	
2010	Cool Dog	Sharon	Direct-to-video film
2010	I Spit on Your Grave	Chastity Storch	Chastity
2011	Julia X	Young Julia	
2013	Trust Me	Lydia	
2015	Poltergeist	Kendra Bowen	
2016	Bedeviled	Alice	
2018	Urban Country	Sara	
2019	Beyond the Law	Charlotte Bayles	
2020	Mile High Escorts	Lauren	

=== Television ===
Year	Title	Role	Notes
2012	Rogue	Jane Forsythe	Television film
2013	Touch	Amelia Robbins	Main role
2016–2017	Love	Simone	Recurring roles (seasons 1–2), 4 episodes
2017	Stalker's Prey	Laura Wilcox	Television film; also known as Hunter's Cove
2017	American Vandal	Sarah Pearson	3 episodes
2017	Law & Order: Special Victims Unit	Savannah Ross	Episode: "Mood"
2017	Freakish	Anka	Main role (season 2)
2017	Lucifer	Carly Glantz	Episode: "What Would Lucifer Do?"
