= Heather O'Rourke =

American child actress (1975–1988)

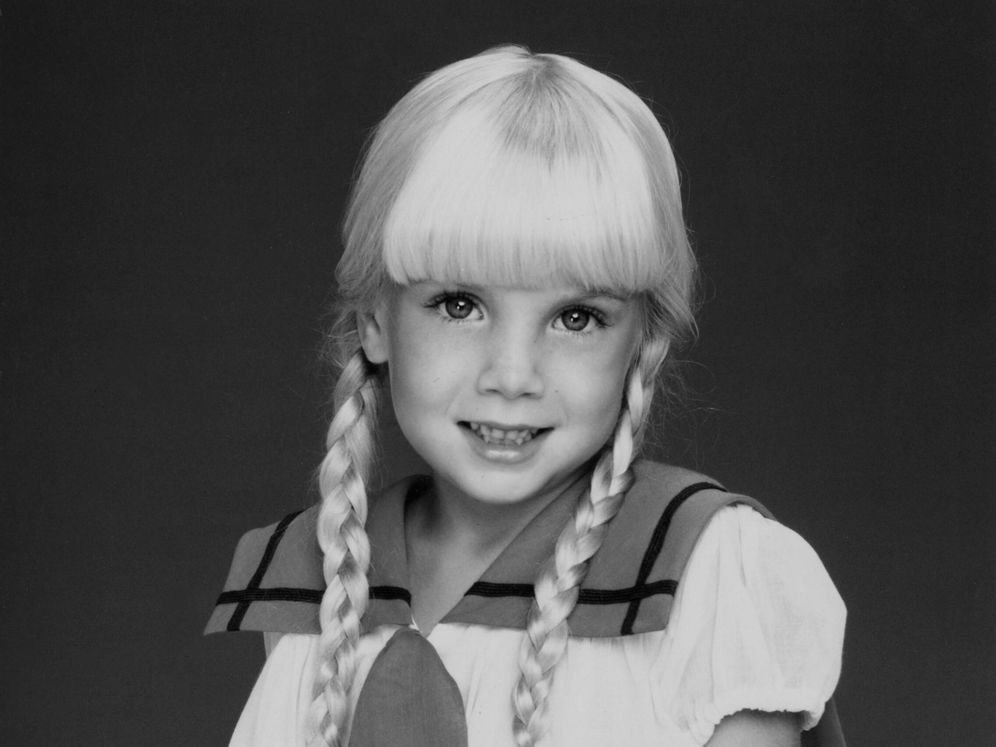
- O'Rourke in 1982
- Born: Heather Michele O'Rourke; December 27, 1975; San Diego, California, U.S.
- Died: February 1, 1988 (aged 12); San Diego, California, U.S.
- Resting place: Westwood Village Memorial Park Cemetery
- Occupation: Actress
- Years active: 1981–1988
- Family: Tammy O'Rourke (sister)

Heather Michele O'Rourke (December 27, 1975 – February 1, 1988) was an American child actress. She had her breakthrough starring as Carol Anne Freeling in the supernatural horror film Poltergeist (1982), which received critical acclaim and established her as an influential figure in the genre. She went on to reprise the role in Poltergeist II: The Other Side (1986) and Poltergeist III (1988), the last of which was released posthumously.

O'Rourke also worked in television, appearing in the recurring roles of Heather Pfister on the comedy series Happy Days (1982–1983) and Melanie in the sitcom Webster (1983), as well as starring as Sarah Brogan in the television-film Surviving: A Family in Crisis (1985).

Throughout her career, O'Rourke was nominated for six Young Artist Awards, winning once for her role in Webster. On February 1, 1988, O'Rourke died following two cardiac arrests, her cause of death later being ruled as congenital stenosis of the intestine complicated by septic shock.

== Early life ==
Heather Michele O'Rourke was born on December 27, 1975, in San Diego, to Kathleen and Michael O'Rourke. Her mother worked as a seamstress and her father was a carpenter. She had an older sister, Tammy O'Rourke, also an actress. Her parents divorced in 1981, and O'Rourke's mother married part-time truck driver Jim Peele in 1984, while they were living in a trailer park in Anaheim, California. Her success later allowed the family to purchase a home in Big Bear Lake, California. Between acting jobs, O'Rourke attended Big Bear Elementary School, where she was president of her fifth grade class. At the time of her death, the family was living in Lakeside, California, a suburb of San Diego.

== Acting career ==
In a contemporary interview with American Premiere magazine, producer Steven Spielberg explained that he was looking for a "beatific four-year-old child...every mother's dream" for the lead in his horror film Poltergeist (1982). While eating in the MGM commissary, Spielberg saw five-year-old O'Rourke having lunch with her mother while older sister Tammy O'Rourke was shooting Pennies from Heaven. After his lunch, Spielberg approached the family and offered O'Rourke the Poltergeist role; she was signed the next day over Drew Barrymore, who instead received the role of Gertie in E.T. the Extra-Terrestrial.

They're here!
O'Rourke's performance of her famous line from Poltergeist

In Poltergeist, O'Rourke played Carol Anne Freeling, a young suburban girl who becomes the conduit and target for supernatural entities. During production, Spielberg twice accommodated the child actress when she was frightened; when she was scared by performing a particular stunt, Spielberg replaced O'Rourke with a stunt double wearing a blonde wig, and when she was disturbed by the portrayal of child abuse, Spielberg did not require her to perform the take again. For her work on the film, O'Rourke earned between $35,000 and $100,000. Poltergeist would go on to receive a cult following and critical acclaim, garnering three Academy Award nominations and a Young Artist Award nomination for O'Rourke. She was lauded for her performance, with The New York Times noting that she played a key role, writing that "With her wide eyes, long blonde hair and soft voice, she was so striking that the sequel played off her presence." Her delivery of the lines "They're here!" in the first film, and "They're baa-aack!" in the second (that film's tagline), placed her in the collective pop culture consciousness of the United States. "They're here!" is ranked No. 69 on the American Film Institute's list of 100 Movie Quotes, and PopSugar included the line on their list of "100 Greatest Movie Quotes".

After her work in Poltergeist (1982), O'Rourke secured several television and TV movie roles. In April 1983, she starred as herself alongside Morey Amsterdam and well-known Walt Disney animated characters in the hour-long television special, Believe You Can...and You Can! She also appeared in CHiPs, Webster, The New Leave It to Beaver, Our House, and had a recurring role on Happy Days as Heather Pfister. For Webster, O'Rourke won her first Young Artist Award. She also appeared in the television movies Massarati and the Brain and Surviving: A Family in Crisis. O'Rourke went on to reprise the role of Carol Anne Freeling in the second and third installments, Poltergeist II: The Other Side in 1986 and Poltergeist III in 1988 respectively; unlike its predecessor, the films garnered mixed reviews, although O'Rourke's performances were praised. Poltergeist III was her final feature, released in June 1988, four months after her death.

== Illness and death ==
In early 1987, O'Rourke became ill with giardiasis, which she contracted from well water at her family's home in Big Bear Lake. She was subsequently diagnosed as having Crohn's disease. She was prescribed cortisone injections to treat the disease during the time she was filming Poltergeist III. The steroidal injections resulted in facial swelling of the cheeks, which O'Rourke's mother said she was very self-conscious about.

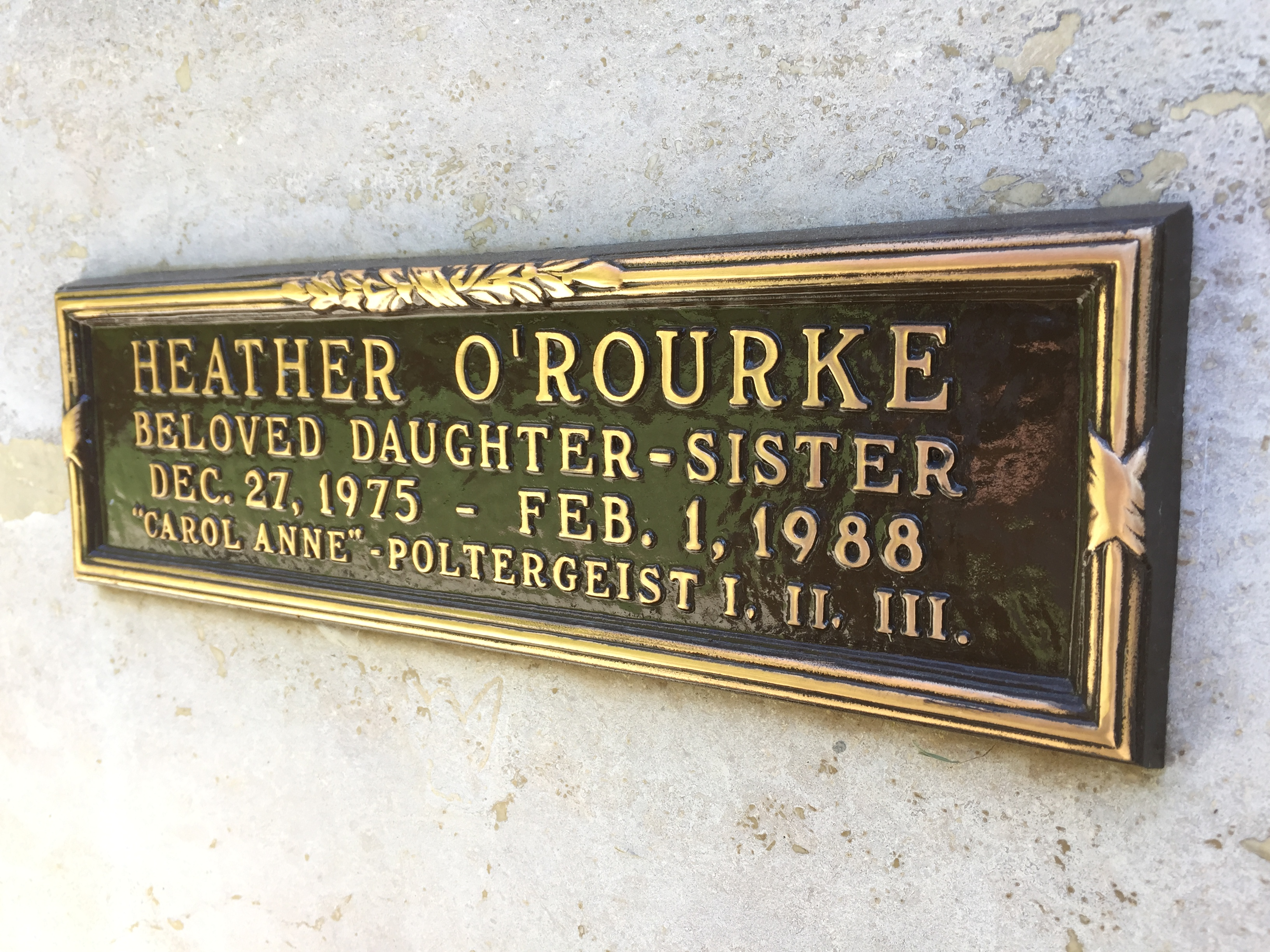
Inscription at O'Rourke's crypt

On January 31, 1988, O'Rourke began exhibiting flu-like symptoms. The following morning, she collapsed in her home, and was rushed to Community Hospital in El Cajon. En route, she suffered cardiac arrest, but paramedics were able to restart her heart at 9:25 a.m. She was subsequently flown to the Children's Hospital of San Diego, where it was discovered she had intestinal stenosis and went into emergency surgery. She survived the surgery, but suffered another cardiac arrest while in the recovery room. Doctors performed CPR for over 30 minutes, but O'Rourke was pronounced dead at 2:43 that afternoon. O'Rourke's cause of death was ruled congenital stenosis of the intestine complicated by septic shock.

Daniel Hollander, the head of gastroenterology at the University of California, Irvine Medical Center stated that O'Rourke's death was "distinctly unusual" as she lacked prior symptoms of the bowel defect: "I would have expected a lot of [digestive] difficulties throughout her life and not just to have developed a problem all of a sudden." However, Dr. Hollander further stated that it was possible for congenital bowel narrowing to cause sudden death without symptoms if an infection caused the bowel to rupture. A private funeral was held for O'Rourke on February 5 in Los Angeles, and she was entombed at Westwood Village Memorial Park Cemetery.

== Documentary ==
A documentary film, Heather O'Rourke: She Was Here, was released in 2026. The film features interviews with family and friends and dispels many of the myths and rumors surrounding O'Rourke's death.

== Filmography ==
=== Film ===
Year	Title	Role	Notes	Ref.
1982	Poltergeist	Carol Anne Freeling		
1986	Poltergeist II: The Other Side	Carol Anne Freeling		
1988	Poltergeist III	Carol Anne Freeling	Posthumous release	

=== Television ===
Year	Title	Role	Notes	Ref.
1981	Fantasy Island	Young Liza Blake	Episode: "Elizabeth's Baby / The Artist and the Lady"	
1982–1983	Happy Days	Heather Pfister	Recurring role; 12 episodes	
1982	Massarati and the Brain	Skye Henry	Television film	
1983	CHiPs	Lindsey	Episode: "Fun House"	
1983	Matt Houston	Sunny Kimball	Episode: "The Woman in White"	
1983	Webster	Melanie	Recurring role; 3 episodes	
1984	Finder of Lost Loves	Jillian Marsh	Episode: "Yesterday's Child"	
1985	Surviving: A Family in Crisis	Sarah Brogan	Television film	
1986–1987	The New Leave It to Beaver	Heather	Episodes: "Material Girl", "Bad Poetry"	
1986	Around the Bend	The Daughter	Television film	
1987	Our House	Dana	Episode: "A Point of View"	
1987	Rocky Road	Russian Girl	Episode: "Moscow on the Boardwalk"	

== Accolades ==
=== Awards and nominations ===
O'Rourke was nominated for a collective six Young Artist Awards, one of which was won for her performance on the series Webster in 1985.

Year	Award	Category	Work	Result
1983	Young Artist Award	Best Young Actress in a Comedy Series	Happy Days	Nominated
1983	Young Artist Award	Best Young Supporting Actress in a Motion Picture	Poltergeist	Nominated
1984	Young Artist Award	Best Performance by a Young Actress in a Television Series	Webster	Nominated
1985	Young Artist Award	Best Performance by a Young Actress in a Television Series	Webster	Won
1986	Young Artist Award	Best Young Actress in a Television Special or Mini-Series	Surviving	Nominated
1987	Young Artist Award	Best Young Supporting Actress in a Motion Picture	Poltergeist II: The Other Side	Nominated

=== Honors ===
- On the American Film Institute's 2005 list of "100 Movie Quotes", O'Rourke's delivery of "They're here!" in Poltergeist is ranked No. 69.
- On PopSugar's 2021 list of "100 Greatest Movie Quotes", O'Rourke's delivery of "They're here!" in Poltergeist is listed.

== Sources ==
- Brode, Douglas (2000). Films of Steven Spielberg (2nd ed.). New York City, New York: Citadel Press. ISBN 0-806-51951-7.
- Cotter, Bill (May 31, 2009) [1997]. The Wonderful World of Disney Television: A Complete History (illustrated ed.). New York City, New York: Disney Hyperion. ISBN 978-0-7868-6359-4.
- Harvey, Diana; Harvey, Jackson (1996). Dead Before Their Time. New York City, New York: Friedman/Fairfax. ISBN 978-1-567-99284-7.
- Lentz, Harris (1983). Science Fiction, Horror and Fantasy Film and Television Credits. Jefferson, North Carolina: McFarland. ISBN 978-0-899-50070-6.
- Parish, James Robert; Terrace, Vincent (1989). The Complete Actors' Television Credits, 1948-1988. Vol. 2. Metuchen, New Jersey: Scarecrow Press. ISBN 978-0-810-82258-0.
- Simpson, Paul (2010). The Rough Guide to Cult Movies (3rd ed.). New York City, New York: Penguin. ISBN 978-1-405-38322-6.
- Spielberg, Steven; Friedman, Lester D.; Notbohm, Brent (2000). Friedman, Lester D.; Notbohm, Brent (eds.). Steven Spielberg: Interviews. Jackson, Mississippi: Univ. Press of Mississippi. ISBN 1-578-06113-X.
