= Mark Victor =

American screenwriter

Mark Victor is a screenwriter. He co-wrote Poltergeist (1982), Poltergeist II: The Other Side (1986), Marked for Death (1990), and Cool World (1992).
