= Alex Nepomniaschy =

Russian-American cinematographer

- Александр Непомнящий
- Born: 1955 (age 70–71); Moscow, Russian SFSR
- Education: New York University; AFI Conservatory (MFA, 1982)
- Occupation: Cinematographer
- Years active: 1981–present
- Website: alexnepomniaschy.com

Alexander Nepomniaschy, ASC (Russian: Александр Непомнящий; born 1955) is a Russian-American cinematographer.

== Life and career ==
Nepomniaschy was born in Moscow in 1955, and moved to the United States in 1974. He attended New York University's Tisch School of the Arts and the AFI Conservatory, graduating with a Master of Fine Arts in cinematography in 1982. He was invited to join the Academy of Motion Picture Arts and Sciences in 2013.

== Filmography ==
=== Film ===
Year	Title	Director	Notes
1986	Last Resort	Zane Buzby	with Stephen M. Katz
1986	Wanted: Dead or Alive	Gary Sherman	
1988	Poltergeist III	Gary Sherman	
1990	Lisa	Gary Sherman	
1990	The End of Innocence	Dyan Cannon	
1991	Whore	Ken Russell	Additional photography
1995	Safe	Todd Haynes	
1996	Mrs. Winterbourne	Richard Benjamin	
1996	The Associate	Donald Petrie	
1997	The Alarmist	Evan Dunsky	
1999	Never Been Kissed	Raja Gosnell	
1999	It's the Rage	James D. Stern	
2002	Narc	Joe Carnahan	
2002	A Time for Dancing	Peter Gilbert	
2004	The Prince & Me	Martha Coolidge	
2004	Taking Lives	D. J. Caruso	Additional photography
2005	Venom	Jim Gillespie	2nd unit photography
2006	Take the Lead	Liz Friedlander	
2006	Hard Luck	Mario Van Peebles	
2006	10th & Wolf	Robert Moresco	
2007	The Education of Charlie Banks	Fred Durst	
2008	Adventures in Appletown	Robert Moresco	Additional photography
2008	Eagle Eye	D. J. Caruso	Additional photography
2010	Country Strong	Shana Feste	2nd unit photography
2011	I Am Number Four	D. J. Caruso	Additional photography
2012	Rites of Passage	W. Peter Iliff	
2013	Snake & Mongoose	Wayne Holloway	2nd unit photography
2013	Standing Up	D. J. Caruso	

=== Television ===
Year	Title	Notes
1987	Sable	Episode: "Toy Gun"
1990	Tales from the Crypt	Episode: "The Thing from the Grave"
1993–94	Missing Persons	11 episodes
1997	Crisis Center	Episode: "He Said, She Said"
1997–99	Beyond Belief: Fact or Fiction	14 episodes
2005	Criminal Minds	Episode: "Extreme Aggressor"
2010	Big Love	4 episodes
2011–12	Supah Ninjas	22 episodes
2012–13	Bunheads	10 episodes
2013–15	Blue Bloods	13 episodes
2014–15	The Mentalist	6 episodes
2016	The Americans	12 episodes
2017	Doubt	12 episodes
2017–18	Wisdom of the Crowd	12 episodes
2019	L.A.'s Finest	6 episodes
2019	Soundtrack	2 episodes
2022–23	The Marvelous Mrs. Maisel	8 episodes
2025	Étoile	4 episodes

==== TV films and miniseries ====
Year	Title	Director
1990	After the Shock	Gary Sherman
1991	Murderous Vision	Gary Sherman
1991	Golden Years	Allen Coulter; Michael Gornick; Kenneth Fink; Stephen Tolkin
1993	Danielle Steel's Star	Michael Miller
1995	Tall, Dark and Deadly	Kenneth Fink
1998	To Live Again	Steven Schachter
2002	Warning: Parental Advisory	Mark Waters
2016	Gilmore Girls: A Year in the Life	Amy Sherman-Palladino; Daniel Palladino

=== Documentary works ===
Year	Title	Director
1987	Beirut: The Last Home Movie	Jennifer Fox
2001	Life and Debt	Stephanie Black
2008	Taking the Face: The Portuguese Bullfight	Matthew Bishop; Juliusz Kossakowski

=== Music videos ===
Year	Title	Artist	Director
1984	I Do' Wanna Know	REO Speedwagon	Kevin Dole; Sherry Revord
1985	Born in the U.S.A.	Stanley Clarke	Kevin Dole

== Awards and nominations ==
Institution	Year	Category	Work	Result	Ref.
American Society of Cinematographers	1989	Outstanding Achievement in Cinematography in Regular Series	Sable ("Toy Gun")	Nominated	
American Society of Cinematographers	2023	Outstanding Achievement in Cinematography in a One-Hour Television Series – Non-Commercial	The Marvelous Mrs. Maisel ("Everything is Bellmore")	Nominated	
Boston Society of Film Critics	1995	Best Cinematography	Safe	Won	
Independent Spirit Award	2003	Best Cinematography	Narc	Nominated	
Sundance Film Festival	1988	Best Cinematography, Documentary	Beirut: The Last Home Movie	Won	
