= Mirai Ninja =

Mirai Ninja may refer to:

- Mirai Ninja (film), 1988 Japanese film
- Mirai Ninja (video game), 1988 Japanese video game
