= Vice Squad (1982 film) =

1982 film by Gary Sherman

- Theatrical release poster
- Directed by: Gary A. Sherman
- Written by: Sandy Howard; Kenneth Peters; Robert Vincent O'Neil
- Produced by: Brian Frankish
- Starring: Season Hubley; Gary Swanson; Wings Hauser
- Cinematography: John Alcott
- Edited by: Roy Watts
- Music by: Joe Renzetti
- Production companies: Sandy Howard Productions; Hemdale Film Corporation
- Distributed by: Avco Embassy Pictures
- Release date: January 22, 1982
- Running time: 97 minutes
- Country: United States
- Language: English
- Budget: $5.5 million
- Box office: $13.2 million

Vice Squad is a 1982 American crime thriller film directed by Gary A. Sherman and starring Season Hubley, Gary Swanson and Wings Hauser. Its plot follows a businesswoman-turned-prostitute (Hubley) who is enlisted by the Los Angeles Police Department to help apprehend a homicidal pimp (Hauser).

The film was released by Avco Embassy Pictures on January 22, 1982. It received mixed reviews, but was a commercial success, and has developed a cult following.

== Plot ==
A down-on-her-luck Los Angeles businesswoman-turned-prostitute, known only by her street name Princess, walks the Sunset Boulevard to support herself and her young daughter Lisa. As she prepares Lisa for a trip to see her grandmother in San Diego, Princess receives a distressed telephone call from her friend and coworker, Ginger Grady, who is hiding in a motel from her abusive pimp Ramrod, a misogynistic psychopath. Shortly thereafter, Ramrod tracks Ginger down and coaxes her to open the door under the guise of an apology. As soon as she does, however, he violently ties her to the bed and beats and rapes her with a pimp stick.

Across town, the work routine of undercover LAPD vice squad sergeant Tom Walsh and trainee officer Edwards is disrupted by a call to the hospital. Tom, who already knows Ramrod at least by reputation, watches Ginger die from her injuries before he can convince her to identify her attacker. Tom promises to avenge her death by bringing Ramrod to justice. He brings Princess down to the hospital morgue to discuss her pending cocaine possession charge and warns that, even though she does not use drugs, an unsympathetic judge will incarcerate her and remove custody of Lisa. He offers her a pardon in exchange for her help catching a violent criminal. Princess initially refuses out of fear upon hearing who the criminal is, but Tom changes her mind by showing her Ginger's corpse.

Princess wears a wire while attracting Ramrod's attention in a nightclub. He invites her back to his apartment, and is promptly arrested by Tom's squad once he reveals incriminating information. Ramrod is surprised but unrepentant when he learns he has killed Ginger, and furiously resists arrest once he realizes the setup. The scuffle ends when Tom pushes a gun against his head, at which point Ramrod vows to kill Princess.

On the drive to the station, Ramrod manages to disable officers Pete Mendez and Kolowski and cause an accident. He has his handcuffs removed, borrows a car from acquaintance Roscoe, and purchases a gun from gay leather club owner Fast Eddie who also identifies Joe Dorsey as Princess' former pimp.

The squad hits the streets looking to find Ramrod and Princess before the two of them cross paths. Detective Louise Williams and her patrol partner Detective Christian Sorensen interrogate Roscoe until they learn which car Ramrod is currently driving. Meanwhile, Princess meets some of her colleagues at a sleazy dive bar where they discuss their customers' kinks. Princess is then propositioned by a patron but remains aloof during sex, and the disgruntled client forcibly takes his money back.

After brutally interrogating and castrating Dorsey, Ramrod heads to Princess' motel. Before he arrives, however, she is picked up by a wealthy client's chauffeur on recommendation of her friend Coco. The vice squad follow Ramrod's trail but Mrs. Cruikshank, the motel manager who had been beaten by Ramrod moments earlier, is uncooperative when Tom interrogates her. Ramrod kidnaps Coco and tortures her until she reveals the chauffeur took Princess to Beverly Hills.

Inside the Beverly Hills house, Princess is instructed to dress as a bride and descend to the parlor, where the elderly client lays motionless in a casket. She accidentally botches the encounter by screaming when he unexpectedly jumps awake. Police officers find the injured Coco beside a trash heap and unknowingly drive past Ramrod who has just stolen a newspaper delivery truck after murdering its driver, and is pursuing Princess' taxi. Her friends attempt to warn her, but Ramrod then chases after them, hitting Dixie, one of the women, in the process. He pulls Princess into his truck and takes her to an abandoned warehouse.

The police arrive as Ramrod begins to torture Princess, and he jumps out the window, shooting multiple officers and stealing a car. Tom relentlessly pursues him across town, finally cornering him in an alleyway and shooting him dead. Just after daybreak, Tom emerges from the warehouse with a gunshot wound in his arm. While being lifted into an ambulance, Princess tells him that he will "never be able to change the streets", and he walks away as the sun rises over the city.

== Cast ==
- Season Hubley as Princess
- Gary Swanson as Detective Tom Walsh
- Wings Hauser as Ramrod
- Pepe Serna as Detective Pete Mendez
- Beverly Todd as Detective Louise Williams
- Joseph DiGiroloma as Detective Kowalski
- Maurice Emanuel as Detective Edwards
- Wayne Hackett as Detective Christian Sorenson
- Nina Blackwood as Ginger
- Sudana Bobatoon as Dixie
- Lydia Lei as Coco
- Kelly Piper as Blue Chip
- Kristoffer Anders as Sergeant Brooks
- Joseph Baroncini as Ted
- Fred Berry as Joe Dorsey
- Tom Brent as Harvey Happy Harve
- Grand L. Bush as Black Pimp
- Marilyn Coleman as Beatrice Adams
- Michael Ensign as Chauffeur
- Stacy Everly as Teenage Junkie
- Cliff Frazier as Mace
- Lyla Graham as Mrs. Cruikshank
- Vincent J. Isaac as Silky
- Cyndi James-Reese as Black Prostitute
- Robert Miano as Duty Sergeant
- Stack Pierce as Roscoe
- Barbara Pilavin as Derelict Woman
- Donald Rawley as Gregory
- Cheryl Smith as White Prostitute
- Hugo Stanger as Old Man At Mansion
- Nicole Volkoff as Lisa
- Richard Wetzel as Fast Eddie
- Ark Wong as Mr. Wong

== Production ==
Producer Brian Frankish and unit production manager James Robert Dyer approached executive producer Sandy Howard about a television documentary about prostitution in Hollywood by interviewing actual pimps and prostitutes with the assistance of the LAPD Vice Squad. Due to the limits imposed by television censorship and inspired by the dramatic possibilities surrounding the subject matter, the project was re-envisioned as a dramatic narrative feature with Howard and Kenneth Peters collaborating on a screenplay; they were later joined by Robert Vincent O'Neil. Executive producer Robert Rehme of Avco Embassy Pictures recommended bringing onboard director Gary A. Sherman, who had recently directed the horror film Dead & Buried for Avco.

In order to prepare for her role as Princess, Season Hubley spent ten weeks with actual Los Angeles prostitutes. The filmmakers also coordinated with the LAPD on a "making of" documentary that included interviews with actual police officers and sex workers.

The film score was composed by Joe Renzetti. Wings Hauser sang the vocal track for the film's opening and closing theme song, "Neon Slime".

== Reception ==
=== Box office ===
The film opened in 510 theaters in the United States, and grossed $5.2 million in North America, with a worldwide gross of $13,253,583.

=== Critical response ===
Stephen Hunter, writing for The Baltimore Sun, wrote that the film's short timeframe results in an "inconsistent structure" and renders "all kinds of difficulty in staying organized," but conceded that Sherman's direction "keeps the action moving swiftly" while noting inconsistent performances from the actors.

Zach Vasquez of CrimeReads called it "one of the most underrated and underseen thrillers of the ’80s, arguably the greatest sleaze noir of all time."

Actor Wings Hauser later noted "I got fan letters like you wouldn’t believe from women, and letters from parents thanking me for scaring the hell out of their kids and keeping them off the street."

On the review aggregator Rotten Tomatoes, the film has a 50% rating based on 6 reviews.

== Home media ==
Anchor Bay Entertainment released Vice Squad on DVD in 2006. Scream Factory released the film in a collector's edition Blu-ray on August 13, 2019.

== Sources ==
- Donahue, Suzanne Mary (1987). American Film Distribution: The Changing Marketplace. Ann Arbor, Michigan: UMI Research Press. ISBN 978-0-835-71776-2.
