= Lewis Van Bergen =

American actor

- Born: November 9, 1938; New York City, New York, United States
- Died: April 6, 2018 (aged 79); United States
- Occupation: Actor
- Years active: 1976–1999

Lewis Van Bergen (November 9, 1938 – April 6, 2018) was an American actor, best known for his role as Jon Sable on the short-lived 1987 television series Sable.

He was in the film Bugsy in the role of Joey Adonis, with whom Bugsy Siegel competed for the affection of Virginia Hill.

== Death ==
Van Bergen died on April 6, 2018, at the age of 79. His cause of death is unknown.

== Filmography ==
=== Film ===
Lewis Van Bergen film credits
Year	Title	Role	Notes
1976	The Passover Plot	Yoram	
1977	Run for the Roses	Farm Hand	
1980	Stir Crazy	Guard #1	
1981	Hard Country	Ransom	
1982	Fighting Back	Laz Burkofsky	
1985	Savage Dawn	Deputy Joe Bob	
1985	Space Rage	Drago	
1987	Rage of Honor	Havlock	
1987	Moon in Scorpio	Mark	(as Louis Van Bergen)
1987	Colpo di stato	John Teller	
1988	South of Reno	Willard	
1991	Bugsy	Joe Adonis	
1993	Street Knight	Lt. Bill Crowe	
1994	Caroline at Midnight	Prince's Bodyguard	
1996	Pinocchio's Revenge	Vincent Gotto	
1997	The Relic	Dr. John Whitney	

=== Television ===
Lewis Van Bergen television credits
Year	Title	Role	Notes
1977	Most Wanted	Lou	Episode: "The Spellbinder"
1978	Baretta	Internal Affairs Officer	Episode: "The Stone Conspiracy"
1978	Richie Brockelman, Private Eye	Santini	Episode: "Escape from Caine Abel"
1978	Overboard	Jean-Paul	TV movie
1978	The Next Step Beyond	Cary de Witt	Episode: "The Return of Cary De Witt"
1979	Detective School		Episode: "The Runaway"
1980	The Misadventures of Sheriff Lobo	Brian Delaney	Episode: "Treasure of Nature Beach"
1981	Shannon	Lufkin	Episode: "Gotham Swansong"
1981–1982	CHiPs	Andy Macedon	2 episodes
1982	Modesty Blaise	Willie Garvin	TV movie
1983	The Dukes of Hazzard	Eddie	Episode: "Lulu's Gone Away"
1983	Lottery!		Episode: "Phoenix: Blood Brothers"
1983–1984	The Fall Guy	Henchman / Jeff	2 episodes
1984	The Fantastic World of D.C. Collins	Denker	TV movie
1985	Cagney & Lacey	Darryl Stokes	Episode: "Stress"
1985	Half Nelson		Episode: "Diplomatic Inmunity"
1985	MacGyver	Buddy	Episode: "Last Stand"
1985	Airwolf	Billy Fargo	Episode: "Where Have All the Children Gone?"
1986	Outlaws	D.J. Ballard	Episode: "Outlaws"
1986	The Equalizer	Zahn	Episode: "A Community of Civilized Men"
1987–1988	Sable	Jon Sable	7 episodes
1988	The Equalizer	Johnny Sax	Episode: "Always a Lady"
1989	The Equalizer	Stuart Dodd	Episode: "Endgame"
1990	Father Dowling Mysteries	Harlan Brock	Episode: "The Exotic Dancer Mystery"
1990	Hunter	Armand	Episode: "This Is My Gun"
1991	ABC Afterschool Special	Father	Episode: "It's Only Rock & Roll"
1991	False Arrest	Arnie Merrill	TV movie
1993	Renegade	Joe Cortez	Episode: "Headcase"
1993	Double Deception	Mark Sawyers	TV movie
1993	Diagnosis: Murder	Tony Gelson	Episode: "Amnesia"
1995	Deadline for Murder: From the Files of Edna Buchanan	Johnny Cresta	TV movie
1995	Murder, She Wrote	Mal Carter	Episode: "Big Easy Murder"
1996	Walker, Texas Ranger	Glen Larkin	Episode: "The Siege"
1999	Vengeance Unlimited	Tim Scanlan	Episode: "Confidence"
