= Marge Kotlisky =

American actress

- Born: Margaret Kotlisky; February 19, 1927; Chicago, Illinois
- Died: December 2, 1997 (aged 70); Chicago, Illinois
- Occupation: Actress
- Years active: 1980-1997

Marge Kotlisky (February 19, 1927 - December 2, 1997) was an American actress.

She began her career on stage before transitioning to film roles. On Broadway she portrayed Grandma Kurnitz in Lost in Yonkers (1991). Other New York plays in which she appeaared included Isn’t It Romantic? and David Mamet’s Edmond, a role that won her an Obie Award. In Chicago, she won the Jefferson Award for performances in You Can’t Take It With You,, Under Milk Wood and The National Health.

She died on December 2, 1997 of cancer.

== Filmography ==
- My Bodyguard (1980)
- Thief (1981)
- Sixteen Candles (1984)
- Sable (unknown episodes, 1987)
- Major League (1989)
- Johnny Ryan (1990) (TV Movie)
- The Kid Who Loved Christmas (1990) (TV Movie)
- L.A. Law (1 episode, 1991)
- Homicide (1991)
- The Public Eye (1992)
- Getting Up and Going Home (1992) (TV Movie)
- The Fresh Prince of Bel-Air (1 episode, 1992)
- Missing Persons (1 episode, 1993)
- Early Edition (1 episode, 1997)
- The Con (1998) (TV Movie)
