= Ronald Shusett =

American screenwriter and film producer (1935–2024)

- Born: June 28, 1935; Pittsburgh, Pennsylvania, U.S.
- Died: August 29, 2024 (aged 89)
- Occupations: Screenwriter; producer
- Years active: 1974–2002
- Spouse: Linda Turley (m. 1976)

Ronald Shusett (June 28, 1935 – August 29, 2024) was an American screenwriter and film producer, best known for his works in the science fiction and horror film genres. Along with co-writer Dan O'Bannon, he is the creator of the Alien film franchise.

== Early life and education ==
Shusett was born to a Jewish family in Pittsburgh, Pennsylvania, but raised in Los Angeles from the age of 3. His brother, Gary Shusett, is the founder of the Sherwood Oaks Film School. Shusett studied drama at the University of California, Los Angeles, and initially worked as a playwright. He cites Alfred Hitchcock as a major inspiration.

== Career ==
In 1974, Shusett's psychological thriller screenplay W was produced by Bing Crosby Productions into a film directed by Richard Quine and starring Twiggy. That same year, Shusett optioned the Philip K. Dick short story, "We Can Remember It for You Wholesale", that became the basis of the film Total Recall.

It was during this time he met his writing partner Dan O'Bannon, after being impressed by his student film Dark Star. The two wrote several spec scripts, with the one entitled Star Beast eventually evolving into Alien (1979). The final script was heavily re-written by producers Walter Hill and David Giler, but in the end Dan O'Bannon received sole screenwriting credit, while O'Bannon and Shusett shared story credit.

Off the success of Alien, Shusett wrote or co-wrote the horror films Phobia (1980), Dead & Buried (1981), and The Final Terror (1983). During the decade, he formed a new writing partnership with Steven Pressfield. Together they wrote the monster adventure film King Kong Lives (1986), the Steven Seagal film Above the Law (1988), and the sci-fi action film Freejack (1992). They were uncredited script doctors on Seagal's next film Hard to Kill (1990).

Shusett (with Dan O'Bannon) was the writer and producer of the 1990 Arnold Schwarzenegger film Total Recall, a project he had begun 16 years prior. He began writing a sequel film, based on Philip K. Dick's short story "The Minority Report," which would eventually become the standalone 2002 film Minority Report. Shusett received an executive-producer credit.

Shusett and O'Bannon received story credits for Alien vs. Predator, as the film incorporated unused elements from their original 1979 screenplay. He likewise received a story credit for the 2012 remake of Total Recall.

== Death ==
Shusett died on August 29, 2024, at age 89.

== Filmography ==
Year	Title	Writer	Producer	Director	Notes
1974	W	Story	No	Richard Quine	
1979	Alien	Story	Executive	Ridley Scott	
1980	Phobia	Story	No	John Huston	
1981	Dead & Buried	Yes	Yes	Gary Sherman	
1983	The Final Terror	Yes	No	Andrew Davis	
1986	King Kong Lives	Yes	Executive	John Guillermin	
1988	Above the Law	Yes	No	Andrew Davis	
1990	Hard to Kill	Rewrites	No	Bruce Malmuth	Uncredited
1990	Total Recall	Yes	Yes	Paul Verhoeven	
1992	Freejack	Yes	Yes	Geoff Murphy	
1997	Bleeders	Yes	No	Peter Svatek	
2002	Minority Report	No	Executive	Steven Spielberg	
2004	Alien vs. Predator	Story	No	Paul W. S. Anderson	
2012	Total Recall	Story	No	Len Wiseman	
