= The Nest (1988 film) =

- Theatrical release poster
- Directed by: Terence H. Winkless
- Screenplay by: Robert King
- Based on: The Nest by Eli Cantor
- Produced by: Julie Corman
- Starring: Robert Lansing; Lisa Langlois; Franc Luz; Terri Treas
- Cinematography: Ricardo Jacques Gale
- Edited by: Stephen Mark; Jim Stewart
- Music by: Rick Conrad
- Production company: Concorde Pictures
- Distributed by: Concorde Pictures
- Release date: May 13, 1988
- Running time: 89 minutes
- Country: United States
- Language: English
- Budget: <$1 million

The Nest is a 1988 American science-fiction horror film directed by Terence H. Winkless in his directorial debut. Based on the 1980 novel of the same name by Eli Cantor (published under the pseudonym Gregory A. Douglas), the film's screenplay was written by Robert King. The film was produced by Julie Corman and stars Robert Lansing, Lisa Langlois, Franc Luz, and Terri Treas.

The Nest takes place in a small New England town that is overrun by genetically engineered killer cockroaches. The local sheriff (Luz) joins forces with his former girlfriend (Langlois) and a pest control agent (Stephen Davies) to defeat the carnivorous insects. The film was released in the United States on May 13, 1988, by Concorde Pictures, and received mixed reviews from critics.

== Plot ==
Richard Tarbell, the sheriff of a small island town called North Port, wakes up one morning to find several cockroaches in his house. He goes to the airport to pick up Elizabeth Johnson, the daughter of town mayor Elias Johnson and a former girlfriend of Richard, who is returning from a four-year absence in time for her father's birthday. Strange occurrences are happening around town—the bindings of every book in the local library have been damaged, and several dogs have been reduced to bloody carcasses.

Dr. Morgan Hubbard arrives to investigate the dog deaths. She places a trap containing a live cat as bait; a number of cockroaches are lured to the trap, wherein they attack and devour the cat. While Hubbard studies the insects, Elizabeth visits the local diner, owned by Richard's current girlfriend, Lillian. Homer Birum, the local pest control agent, attempts to exterminate some cockroaches inside the establishment.

Hubbard notes that the cockroaches can reproduce asexually, and her hand is wounded by cockroach bites. She sprays the insects with rotenone but is only able to kill them using a dosage lethal to humans. Elias suggests they evacuate the island, but Hubbard persuades him not to. Meanwhile, Richard shows a number of small objects found on a dog carcass to Homer, who identifies them as Periplaneta droppings. Richard's secretary Millie informs him that Hubbard worked in genetics at MIT, and that she performed illegal experiments.

Elizabeth ventures into a cave and discovers equipment belonging to INTEC, a corporation with whom Elias made a deal to develop the island. After being chased from the cave by flesh-eating cockroaches, she and Richard confront Elias and Hubbard. When Elias demands that Richard cease his investigations, Richard resigns as sheriff. Several people are killed by the cockroaches, including diner employee Church, Homer's friend Jake, and the librarian Mrs. Pennington.

Elias calls INTEC representative Mr. Hauser and demands that they take action against the cockroaches, or else he will reveal information to the national media. Hauser agrees to spray the island with lethal insecticide at 5 a.m. Elias adds that if residents are unable to evacuate, they will turn on the lighthouse beam as a signal not to spray the island. Hubbard notices that cockroach eggs which survived the rotenone have hatched and are now immune to the chemical.

Richard finds both Millie and Lillian dead. Homer accidentally blows up his house while attempting to kill the cockroaches. Richard and Homer confront Hubbard, who reveals that INTEC created a species of cockroach designed to eat other cockroaches and then die after one generation; however, the engineered cockroaches survived and reproduced. In order to prevent INTEC from spraying the island and thereby making the eggs in the cave immune to the poison, Richard and Homer set out to turn the lighthouse beam on.

Elias and Elizabeth are attacked by cockroaches in Elias's home, including a cat-cockroach hybrid that Homer crushes. It is revealed that the cockroaches can genetically mutate into hybrids of whatever prey they've eaten. Elias is killed by the cockroaches and returns as a human-cockroach hybrid, which Elizabeth kills with a shotgun. Elizabeth, Hubbard, and Richard go to the cave and find the nest, while Homer heads to the lighthouse. Hubbard is killed by a queen cockroach-human hybrid, and Elizabeth and Richard detonate an explosive inside the cave, incinerating all the cockroaches inside. Homer turns on the lighthouse beam, stopping INTEC from spraying the island.

However, one surviving cockroach is seen, indicating that the cycle of terror will start over again.

== Cast ==
- Robert Lansing as Elias Johnson
- Lisa Langlois as Elizabeth Johnson
- Franc Luz as Richard Tarbell
- Terri Treas as Dr. Morgan Hubbard
- Stephen Davies as Homer Birum
- Diana Bellamy as Mrs. Pennington
- Jack Collins as Jake "Shakey Jake"
- Nancy Morgan as Lillian
- Jeff Winkless as Church
- Steve Tannen as Mr. Perkins
- Heidi Helmer as Jenny

== Production ==
The filmmakers used 2,000 flying cockroaches during filming at Quicksilver Studios in Venice, Los Angeles. When some of the insects escaped into nearby dressing rooms, the American Humane Association were unable to assist them as the organization must be contacted prior to shooting on matters concerning insects. The cockroaches had been provided by World of Animals.

The pick up truck explosion and the exterminator's house explosion in the movie are both taken from footage from Humanoids from the Deep, a 1980 science fiction film starring Doug McClure and Vic Morrow.

Lead actress, Lisa Langlois afterwards expressed her disdain for the movie poster used for The Nest, which showed a woman in underwear being ravaged by a giant cockroach, and pointed out that her character appeared in no such scene. She complained that the poster made it look like she was being seduced by a giant cockroach. "I think as a woman," she said, "I was feeling really exploited. But now...I can laugh at it."

== Release ==
=== Critical response ===
The film received a mixed response from film critics. Candice Russell of the Sun-Sentinel wrote: "Fulfilling the promise of The Hellstrom Chronicle, The Nest is a roach rout. It's no masterpiece, but in the last 40 minutes, fans of the genre get their money's worth." The Los Angeles Times' Leonard Klady praised Winkless' direction and King's screenplay, noting that the film "hatches its clever plot extremely successfully." Writing for the Fort Worth Star-Telegram, Michael H. Price gave the film a score of seven out of ten, commending its special effects and calling it an "unusually well-made cheapo shockeroo" that "pumps enough vigor into a tired subgenre [...] to make the old nature-gone-haywire premise seem fresh."

Ed Bank of The Pittsburgh Press awarded the film one-and-a-half stars, criticizing its storyline as being "too familiar." A reviewer for the New York Daily News wrote that the film "broke little in the way of new bug-movie ground."

In 2013, Jon Abrams of Daily Grindhouse thought the film was enjoyable, though not inventive; he wrote, "The Nest is neither the first nor the best horror film about killer cockroaches, and it doesn't rank with the likes of the final segment of Creepshow or Jeannot Szwarc's Bug in terms of 'ew' factor, but it's still an enjoyable little flick even if it doesn't do much to forward the genre."

== Home media ==
The Nest was first released on VHS by MGM/UA Home Video in 1989. It was released on DVD for the first time by New Concorde Home Entertainment on August 28, 2001, now out of print. Scream Factory, a subsidiary of Shout! Factory, released the film on Blu-ray and DVD as a combo pack on February 19, 2013.
