= Mirai Ninja (video game) =

1988 video game

- Japanese arcade flyer
- Developer: Namco
- Publisher: Namco
- Platform: Arcade
- Release: JP: December 1988
- Genre: Platform
- Modes: Single-player, Multiplayer
- Arcade system: Namco System 2

Mirai Ninja (Note: Japanese: 未来忍者, Hepburn: Mirai Ninja; lit. "Future Ninja") is a 1988 platform video game developed and published by Namco for arcades. It was only released in Japan in December 1988. It was adapted into the Japanese live-action film of the same name, which was concurrently developed and produced by Namco as their first film. Character designs and directing of the film were done by Keita Amemiya of Zeiram and Kamen Rider fame. Although the arcade game was only released in Japan, the film was released direct-to-video overseas by Mondo Pop.

The game was only moderately successful. Hamster Corporation released it outside Japan for the first time as part of their Arcade Archives series for the Nintendo Switch and PlayStation 4 in 2021.

== Gameplay ==
The player controls the cyborg ninja Shiranui who must navigate through various levels to rescue Princess Saki from an army of other cyborg ninja. He can defeat various enemies and bosses by rapidly throwing shurikens at them (and slashing them with his sword at close range). His life meter is displayed in Kanji, causing his appearance to devolve to technology of a certain decade when damaged.

== Reception ==
In Japan, Game Machine listed Mirai Ninja on their January 1, 1989 issue as being the tenth most-successful table arcade unit of the month.
