= Lisa (1990 film) =

1990 thriller/drama film directed by Gary Sherman

- Theatrical release poster
- Directed by: Gary Sherman
- Written by: Gary Sherman; Karen Clark
- Produced by: Frank Yablans
- Starring: Cheryl Ladd; D. W. Moffett; Staci Keanan
- Cinematography: Alex Nepomniaschy
- Edited by: Ross Albert
- Music by: Joe Renzetti
- Production company: United Artists
- Distributed by: MGM/UA Communications Co. (United States); United International Pictures (International)
- Release date: April 20, 1990
- Running time: 95 minutes
- Country: United States
- Language: English
- Box office: $4.3 million

Lisa is a 1990 American thriller film directed by Gary Sherman and starring Cheryl Ladd, D. W. Moffett and Staci Keanan in her film debut. Its plot follows teenage girl Lisa Holland's infatuation with Richard, a stranger that, unknown to her, is a serial killer-stalker.

== Plot ==
Fourteen-year-old Lisa Holland lives with her mother Katherine, a successful florist. Lisa is beginning to show a keen interest in boys but is not allowed to date due to her mother's strict rule about not dating until she is 16. Lisa's desire to have a boyfriend is furthered by her best friend Wendy Marks, whose less-strict mother and father have allowed her to start dating.

Meanwhile, there is a serial killer running loose nicknamed the Candlelight Killer, because he rapes his victims by candlelight before killing them. The Candlelight Killer is a suave, good-looking, and successful restaurateur named Richard, who looks more like a Gentleman's Quarterly model than a serial killer. Richard stalks good-looking women once he finds out where they live. Uniquely, Richard calls his victims over the telephone leaving messages on their answering machines saying he is in their place of residence and is going to kill them. As the women are listening to his message, Richard grabs them from behind and then begins his vicious attacks.

One night, Lisa is coming home from the convenience store, and accidentally runs into Richard, leaving the house of another victim. Lisa is mesmerized by his good looks and follows him to his car once he leaves, copying down his license plate number. Through the DMV, she is able to get his address and telephone number. Lisa then begins to call up Richard on the phone and engages him in seductive conversation. Richard is intrigued by their conversations, yet is more interested in finding out who she is, mainly because he is the one now being stalked.

Lisa and Wendy follow Richard, finding out where he lives and works. Lisa even gets into Richard's car alone at one point only to have to hide in the back seat when he unexpectedly shows up. All this goes on unknown to Katherine, and with each succeeding conversation, in which Lisa reveals more about herself, Richard pushes Lisa towards meeting him for a date. Still at a standoff with her mother when it comes to dating, Wendy suggests that Lisa set up Katherine with Richard, implying that maybe if her mother "gets some", she will ease up and allow Lisa to date.

As Easter weekend approaches, Lisa plans to go away with Wendy and her family to Big Bear, California. Katherine and Lisa decide to have a girls' night out dinner before she leaves, and Lisa makes reservations at Richard's restaurant. Lisa calls Richard informing him that she will be at the restaurant that night. Katherine goes to the bathroom ordering Lisa to pay the bill with her credit card. Richard gets a love note from Lisa with the bill, which reveals Katherine's credit card information, which he uses to track her down. When Lisa and Katherine arrive home, the two start bickering over Lisa's dating. Lisa immediately shouts back to Katherine that "maybe if she got it once in a while, she wouldn't be such a bitch", to her mother's dismay. Katherine orders Lisa to go to her room and grounds her, while taking her phone from her room.

Meanwhile, Richard begins to stalk the unsuspecting Katherine. While in Big Bear, Lisa decides to give Richard a call. He reveals to her that he knows her name is Katherine and that he knows where she lives. Katherine comes home from work and enters the apartment and hears a message from Richard. She finds blood on a hand towel in the bathroom and knocks on Lisa's bedroom door thinking she is home and has cut herself shaving her legs. Meanwhile, Lisa returns home and enters the apartment. Returning home from her trip, she walks upstairs to the apartment and towards her room and calls out for her mother. She sees her picture binder with Richard on the page, and the door slams suddenly behind her. She is attacked by Richard, who has her mother in his clutches and soon knocks Katherine unconscious. Richard brings Lisa into Katherine's bedroom and plans to assault her; Lisa sees the candles and realizes he is the Candlelight Killer. However, Katherine regains consciousness and knocks out Richard from behind and sends him through a window to his death. Relieved to be alive, mother and daughter collapse into each other's arms.

== Cast ==
- Cheryl Ladd as Katherine Holland
- D. W. Moffett as Richard / The Candlelight Killer
- Staci Keanan as Lisa Holland
- Tanya Fenmore as Wendy Marks
- Jeffrey Tambor as Mr. Marks, Wendy's Father
- Julie Cobb as Mrs. Marks, Wendy's Mother
- Edan Gross as Ralph Marks, Wendy's Brother

== Release ==
Lisa was released to theaters on April 20, 1990 through United Artists. It achieved a domestic gross of $4,347,648, with an opening night of $1,119,895.

Sherman claims that MGM basically cut the movie's chances of being a success in theaters because of the deal made with the studio, which not only insisted Cheryl Ladd as the star (supposedly because she had a following in Japan) but also had "ancillary" rights while Sherman had theatrical; the studio promised 1,200 prints and ended up doing just 200 prints for a weekend, apparently due to preselling to Lifetime on ancillary.

=== Home media ===
Lisa received a home video release in December 1990. The movie received a DVD release as part of MGM MOD Wave 16 and was released on June 28, 2012. A Blu-ray edition, featuring a commentary track from director Gary Sherman and an interview with D. W. Moffett supervised by Scorpion Releasing, was released in December 2015 by Kino Lorber.

== Reception ==
Critical reception for the film was negative; praise tended to center upon Cheryl Ladd's performance while criticism centered around the script and tropes. Roger Ebert gave the film 1½ stars, stating that it was "a bludgeon movie with little respect for the audience's intelligence, and simply pounds us over the head with violence whenever there threatens to be a lull." A reviewer for The Ottawa Citizen was also critical, praising Ladd's performance while also criticizing the film as "hysterical and transparent in its attempt to scare audience members into hosing down their hormones." On the review aggregator website Rotten Tomatoes, 50% of 6 critics' reviews are positive. Metacritic, which uses a weighted average, assigned the film a score of 53 out of 100, based on 7 critics, indicating "mixed or average" reviews.
