= Zeiram =

1991 Japanese science fiction film

- Theatrical release poster
- Directed by: Keita Amemiya
- Screenplay by: Keita Amemiya; Hajime Matsumoto
- Produced by: Yoshinori Chiba; Koichi Sugisawa
- Starring: Yūko Moriyama; Kunihiro Ida; Yukijirō Hotaru
- Cinematography: Hiroshi Kidokoro
- Music by: Koichi Ohta
- Production companies: GAGA communications; Crowd Inc.
- Release date: December 21, 1991 (Japan)
- Running time: 97 minutes
- Country: Japan

Zeiram (Japanese: ゼイラム, Hepburn: Zeiramu), originally marketed in English as Zeram, is a 1991 Japanese science fiction film directed by Keita Amemiya. The film stars Yūko Moriyama as an extraterrestrial bounty hunter named Iria, who comes to Earth to do battle with Zeiram, a powerful alien creature. With the help of her partner—an artificial intelligence named Bob—and two ordinary Japanese electricians, Iria fights Zeiram in a virtually constructed alternate dimension known as a "Zone".

Zeiram was released in Japan in August 1991. It was dubbed in English and released in the United States in 1994, where it garnered mixed reviews from American film critics. That same year, the film was followed by a six-episode original video animation (OVA) known as Iria: Zeiram the Animation (which serves as a prequel to the film), as well as a sequel film titled Zeiram 2.

== Plot ==
Extraterrestrial bounty hunters Iria and Bob (the latter being an artificial intelligence) accept a job to apprehend Zeiram, a powerful alien entity, on Earth. They set up a command center in an abandoned building in a Japanese town, and create a virtually constructed alternate dimension called a "Zone" (in this case, the Zone they construct is a simulated recreation of the town, but without any living residents) where they plan to combat and capture Zeiram. Iria and Bob's use of stolen electricity results in electric company employees Kamiya and Teppei investigating their base just as Zeiram enters Earth's atmosphere.

Kamiya accidentally flips a switch that transports Teppei into the Zone. While Kamiya tries to get an explanation from Iria, she transports the two of them to the Zone. Upon arrival, she traps him in a hardened encasing and leaves to destroy the pod Zeiram arrived in. Teppei finds Zeiram, who creates and sends a smaller monster after him; fleeing, Teppei eventually stumbles across the captured Kamiya, and later Iria. Iria's initial attempt to capture Zeiram fails and she finds he has a shield that makes him immune to bullet fire. Iria decides to utilize a special combat suit, despite Bob's protests to not fight Zeiram in close-range combat. After Iria finally manages to capture Zeiram in an encasing, Teppei asks her to free Kamiya, and she obliges. Iria is accidentally teleported back to Earth with one of Zeiram's subordinates, and their ensuing fight damages the teleportation unit. Using weapons left behind by Iria, Teppei saves Kamiya from the monster Zeiram summoned, but Kamiya accidentally shoots the lock to Zeiram's encasing, freeing Zeiram.

Iria tries teleporting back to the Zone but is set back by a power failure. Teppei and Kamiya hotwire a car and use it to incapacitate Zeiram. The human-like face on Zeiram's "hat" attacks them, biting Kamiya. Teppei and Kamiya escape soon after. Bob speculates that Zeiram is a forbidden biological weapon whose "hat" is used to eat other beings and use the organic matter he consumes to produce his monster subordinates. Zeiram's attempt to make a subordinate copy of Kamiya ends in failure and he kills it in anger.

Teppei receives a communicator from Iria. She explains the problems with the transporter and that the Zone itself will not last much longer. Iria and Bob decide to bring a powerful weapon called the Metis Cannon to fight Zeiram, despite the personal risk it causes them to use it without prior approval from the authorities to whom the bounty hunters answer. Teppei loses track of Kamiya but follows Iria's instructions to head towards a building where the Metis Cannon will be transported to. Teppei is impeded by Zeiram along the way, but is reunited with Kamiya, who hijacks an excavator in an attempt to save Teppei from Zeiram. Iria suddenly arrives and shoots Zeiram with a bazooka.

Despite his body being reduced to its skeleton, Zeiram continues to pursue the trio. Iria defends Teppei and Kamiya as they retrieve the Metis Cannon from the spot Bob transported it to. Iria uses the Metis Cannon to reduce Zeiram down to his "hat", and traps him with eight minutes to spare before the Zone breaks down. Teppei and Kamiya are teleported back to Earth, where they meet Bob. Zeiram is teleported to Earth next, but begins to hover and destroys the transport unit needed to bring Iria back. He escapes from the trap, and from Zeiram's "hat" spawns a new form of the creature with prehensile appendages. Kamiya uses his technician skills to help repair the transport unit while Zeiram attacks Teppei. Kamiya succeeds and Iria returns in time to save the two men and Bob from Zeiram. After a brief respite, Iria complements the two on their resilience and offers them two of her braids as a "thank you" gesture. Bob takes a photo of the trio together as a memento.

== Cast ==
Cast
Role	Japanese	English
Iria	Yūko Moriyama	Edie Mirman
Teppei	Kunihiro Ida	Steve Bulen
Kamiya	Yukijiro Hotaru	Robert Axelrod
Bob	Masakazu Handa	Jeff Winkless
Murata	Yukitomo Tochino	Steve Kramer
Store Manager	Naomi Enami	Jeff Winkless
Zeiram	Mizuho Yoshida	

=== English dubbing staff ===
- Voice Production: Streamline Pictures
- Voice Director: Carl Macek
- Script: Steve Kramer
- Additional Dialogue: Carl Macek
- Recording Engineer: David Walsh, Deb Adair
- Final Mix: Ernie Sheesley
- Production Manager: Scott Narrie
- Recording Studio: Screenmusic Studios

== Production ==
The film was the second film directed by Keita Amemiya, with his first being Mirai Ninja.

== Release ==
Zeiram was released in Japan in August 1991. The film was released in the United States with an English dub by Streamline Pictures in 1994, under the title Zeram. In March 1994, the film screened with Japanese audio and English subtitles at the Brattle Theatre in Cambridge, Massachusetts. In April 1994, the film premiered in New York at the Westbury Theater.

The English-dubbed Zeram was released on VHS in the United States by Fox Lorber in 1994. It received a DVD release in the U.S. by Image Entertainment in 1998, and was released with both Japanese and English audio as Zeiram by Tokyo Shock in 2006.

== Reception ==
Zeiram received mixed reviews from American film critics. Russell Smith of the Austin American-Statesman gave the film a score of two out of five stars, praising the opening black-and-white sequence but describing the remainder of the film as "90 minutes of enjoyable but unspectacular Japanese science fiction with a fair amount of wit and funky charm, but few real thrills." Newsday's Terry Kelleher, who gave the film two out of four stars, was unimpressed by the comedic banter between the characters of Kamiya and Teppei, but concluded that, "The business of Zeiram is action, and Amemiya keeps it coming, accompanying the abundant violence with a refreshingly small amount of gore."

A reviewer for Fangoria described wanting to "reach into the picture tube and slap the two male idiots [Kamiya and Teppei]," and criticized the English dubbing, but praised the film's imagination and overall called it "loads of hi-tech fun, and although it's primarily aimed at a juvenile audience, it has enough extreme gore and craziness to keep anyone amused, especially fans of '60s superheroes such as Ultraman." Similarly, Betsy Sherman of The Boston Globe wrote that the film "melds the cheesy camp of '60s Japanese monster movies, the resourcefulness of recent Hong Kong fantasy pictures and the sensibility of pulp science fiction. The mix of characters seems to be aimed toward a young audience, but there are some good yucky special effects for genre fans." A reviewer for LA Weekly praised the film's direction and special effects, describing the latter as "so insidious they're the stuff of nightmares and so cheesy they're the stuff of fondue", and writing: "Zeiram may call to mind Blade Runner, Alien and even John Carpenter's The Thing, but Japanese sci-fi director Keita Amemiya never ceases to amaze with his originality and inventiveness."

Jonathan Clements, writing for The Encyclopedia of Science Fiction, highlighted Zeiram's economical production design, particularly its use of a pocket universe resembling deserted contemporary Japan, which allowed the filmmakers to stage a science-fiction action story in ordinary locations with minimal expense. He compared this approach to The Terminator (1984) and suggested that lead actress Yūko Moriyama's screen presence was a major factor in the film's appeal and the subsequent development of the franchise. Clements was less impressed by the sequel, Zeiram 2 (1994), questioning the significance of its Seiun Award victory and comparing it unfavorably with the previous year's winner, Jurassic Park. He also noted that widespread piracy of the anime prequel, Iria: Zeiram the Animation, reportedly undermined its commercial prospects in English-speaking markets, interpreting this as an early indication of later controversies surrounding intellectual property and digital media.

== Anime OVA prequel ==
Iria: Zeiram the Animation is a six-episode original video animation (OVA) anime series produced by Ashi Productions and directed by Tetsurō Amino. Released in 1994, the series serves as a prequel to the original Zeiram, taking place several years earlier when Iria is still a rookie and detailing the events surrounding a prior encounter between her and the titular entity. Fujikuro from Zeiram 2 makes an appearance in the OVA.

== Sequel film ==
Zeiram 2 (ゼイラム2, Zeiramu 2), a sequel film also directed by Amemiya and featuring Moriyama, Ida and Hotaru reprising their roles from the first film, was released in Japan on December 17, 1994. The plot of Zeiram 2 centers around the creature's core, which was presumed dead, having been recovered by a shadowy organization which installs it as the organic core of a robotic supersoldier. Iria, Bob, Teppei, and Kamiya continue their battle against Zeiram in a Zone created by the monster. The plot plays out similarly to the original Zeiram, with the four getting into cat-and-mouse confrontations with the creature and the monsters that he summons and dealing with complications caused by Iria and Bob's faulty tech. The sequel adds the additional challenge of Fujikuro, a manipulative rival and saboteur who seeks the same ancient teleportation relic called the Kamarite that Iria and Bob returned to Earth to obtain.

== Video game ==
ZeiramZone
- Developer: Banpresto
- Publisher: Banpresto
- Platform: PlayStation
- Release: JP: 13 December 1996
- Genres: Beat 'em up Fighting
- Modes: Single-player; Multiplayer (cheat codes only)

ZeiramZone (ゼイラムゾーン), stylized as ZËIЯAMZΘNE, is a beat 'em up / fighting game for the PlayStation. It is partially based on the films Zeiram & Zeiram 2.
