= Scene of the Crime (1996 film) =

- Home video cover art
- Directed by: Terence H. Winkless
- Written by: Craig J. Nevius
- Produced by: Roger Corman; Mike Elliott; Michael Amato (co-producer)
- Starring: Ben Gazzara; Alex McArthur; Renee Griffin; Jacob Witkin
- Cinematography: Christopher Baffa
- Edited by: David Byron Lloyd; Robert L. Goodman (recut)
- Music by: Jeff Winkless
- Distributed by: New Horizon Picture Corp; Concorde Pictures; Showtime Networks
- Release date: 1996
- Running time: 83-90 min
- Country: United States
- Language: English

Scene of the Crime (also known by the title Ladykiller) is a 1996 American independent erotic thriller/mystery/suspense film, directed by Terence H. Winkless.

== Synopsis ==
Over a year after a chase to catch a serial slayer dubbed the 'LADYKILLER' ended in the death of his old partner, police officer Lt. Jack 'Jigsaw' Lasky sees a chance to redeem himself when another serial killer, 'The Piggy Bank Murderer', starts preying on female students at a local campus. He slasheds his victims' throats with a switchblade before stuffing loose change into their mouths, leaving behind the words "She Needed The Money" wherever he goes. Jack's search leads to a number one suspect in the form of Richard Darling, an out-of-work actor drawn to the case for reasons unknown... just as he is drawn to Jack's art student daughter, Jennifer who is studying at the same college where these murders are occurring. As Jack finds himself becoming partnered with Richard who continues always being never far away from when the next homicide occurs. Jack searches to uncover this killer before he continues his killing spree with Jennifer.

== Cast ==
| Actor / Actress | Character |
|---|---|
| Ben Gazzara | Lt. Jack 'Jigsaw' Lasky |
| Alex McArthur | Richard Darling |
| Renee Griffin (as Renee Ammann) | Jennifer Lasky |
| Jacob Witkin | Professor Dandridge |
| Stephen Davies | Mike Fenton |
| Terri Treas | Capt. Lorraine Hanover |
| Lucy Lee Flippin | Mrs. Morlock |
| Jeannie Millar | Nikki |
| Tim De Zarn | Mackey |
| Steve Wilde | Colin Taylor |
| Lisa Canning | Leslie Vance |
| Landon Hall | Vicky Gallagher |
| David Yost | Josh White |
| Joanne Baron | Marsha Levine |
| Jeff Winkless | Len Mirkin |
| Julia Dahl | Marci Davis |
| Jackie Debatin | Tease |
| Rick Dean | Everhard |
| Monique Parent | Debbie Schaffer |
| Bob McFarland | Lt. Hatcher |
| Eddie Driscoll | Detective |
| Steve Tannen (as Steven Tannen) | Detective |
| Terence H. Winkless (as Terence Henry) | Detective |
