= Total Recall (2012 film) =

2012 film by Len Wiseman

- Theatrical release poster
- Directed by: Len Wiseman
- Screenplay by: Kurt Wimmer; Mark Bomback
- Story by: Ronald Shusett; Dan O'Bannon; Jon Povill; Kurt Wimmer
- Based on: Total Recall by Ronald Shusett Dan O'Bannon Gary Goldman Jon Povill; "We Can Remember It for You Wholesale" by Philip K. Dick
- Produced by: Neal H. Moritz; Toby Jaffe
- Starring: Colin Farrell; Kate Beckinsale; Jessica Biel; Bryan Cranston; John Cho; Bill Nighy
- Cinematography: Paul Cameron
- Edited by: Christian Wagner
- Music by: Harry Gregson-Williams
- Production companies: Columbia Pictures; Original Film
- Distributed by: Sony Pictures Releasing
- Release date: August 3, 2012
- Running time: 118 minutes
- Country: United States
- Language: English
- Budget: $125 million
- Box office: $211.8 million

Total Recall is a 2012 American science fiction action film directed by Len Wiseman from a screenplay by Kurt Wimmer and Mark Bomback, conceived by Wimmer, Ronald Shusett, Dan O'Bannon, and Jon Povill. It stars Colin Farrell, Kate Beckinsale, and Jessica Biel. The film is an adaptation of the 1990 film of the same name, which was inspired by the 1966 short story "We Can Remember It for You Wholesale" by Philip K. Dick. The supporting cast features Bryan Cranston, Bokeem Woodbine, John Cho, and Bill Nighy. Unlike the original film, the setting is on a futuristic Earth, not Mars.

The film was first announced in 2009. Produced by Columbia Pictures in association with producers Neal H. Moritz and Toby Jaffe's Original Film, Total Recall was released in North America on August 3, 2012, to generally negative reviews, and grossed $211.8 million worldwide.

== Plot ==
At the end of the 21st century, chemical warfare has devastated the Earth. The only habitable land left consists of two territories: the United Federation of Britain (UFB), located on the British Isles and northwestern Europe, and the Colony, spanning all of Australia. Factory workers from the Colony commute to the UFB each day via "The Fall", a gravity elevator running through the Earth's core. (Note: According to sources close to the making of the film, the Colony was originally intended to be named "New Asia", and the Fall similarly was to be called "The China Fall"; these names were allegedly changed mid-production in order to conform to Chinese censorship laws.) The disparity in living conditions has resulted in a group of people called the Resistance, deemed terrorists by the UFB, who seek to improve living conditions in the Colony.

Colony worker Douglas Quaid has been having unsettling dreams of being a secret agent partnered with an unnamed woman. Tired of his factory job building police robots with his friend Harry, he visits Rekall, a company that implants artificial memories. He decides on the fantasy of being a secret agent. During exploratory preparations by technician McClane, they discover that Quaid already has real memories of being a spy. As McClane starts to question Quaid about the memories, a squad of UFB police arrive, killing the Rekall staff in an attempt to arrest Quaid. Strange instincts kick in as Quaid defends himself, killing the entire squad. Upon returning home, Quaid relays the incident to his wife Lori, who attempts to kill him, revealing that she is a UFB intelligence agent and they have only been married for six weeks, not seven years as he believed. After Quaid escapes, he receives a phone call from Charles Hammond, a former colleague of his who directs him to a safe-deposit box. Inside it, Quaid finds a message from himself with the address of a UFB apartment. Lori then gets a call from UFB Chancellor Cohaagen to take Quaid alive, instead, Lori disregards his command and orders her team to shoot to kill.

Upon arriving at the UFB, Quaid is pursued by Lori and her team, but is rescued by Melina, the woman from his dreams. Recuperating at the apartment, Quaid finds another hidden recording, revealing his true identity as rogue UFB agent Carl Hauser, who was working for Cohaagen to infiltrate the Resistance before Hauser defected. He had discovered a kill code that can disable an army of robots that Cohaagen intends to use to destroy the Colony and give the UFB more living space, but was captured by UFB agents and implanted with false memories to manipulate him. Nonetheless, Matthias, the Resistance leader, should be able to retrieve the memory of the kill code. Subsequently, Melina reveals she was Hauser's lover before he was captured, comparing their matching scars from when they were shot while holding hands in Quaid's "dream". They are soon surrounded by the police and Harry, who claims that Quaid is still in a Rekall-induced dream and killing Melina is the only way out. A confused Quaid is initially uncertain until he sees a tear on Melina's cheek and shoots Harry. Lori pursues the pair, but they manage to escape.

Melina takes Quaid to see Matthias, who searches his memories until Lori and Cohaagen storm the Resistance base. Cohaagen reveals he came up with the idea of the kill code to trick Quaid into leading him to Matthias before killing Matthias, taking Melina prisoner, and ordering a team to restore Quaid's memory to the "old Hauser" before he was corrupted. However, Hammond reveals himself and frees Quaid, dying in the process.

Cohaagen loads the Fall with his robot army as Quaid sneaks on board, setting timed explosives throughout the vessel while searching for Melina. After reaching the Colony and freeing her, they fight Cohaagen and his soldiers until Quaid's explosives detonate. Quaid and Melina jump off before the vessel plummets back into the tunnel and explodes underground, killing Cohaagen and destroying his army along with the Fall itself.

Quaid wakes up in an ambulance with Melina, who he soon realizes is a holographically disguised Lori. Quaid eventually kills her before reuniting with the real Melina as news channels declare the Colony's independence from the UFB.

== Cast ==
- Colin Farrell as Douglas Quaid / Carl Hauser, a factory worker suffering from strange violent dreams. He is revealed to be a former UFB operative assigned by Cohaagen to assassinate Matthias, before his defection to the Resistance and recapture, by manipulating Quaid to his former life.
  - Ethan Hawke makes an uncredited cameo as the original Carl Hauser in the Director's Cut.
- Kate Beckinsale as Lori, an abusive UFB undercover agent posing as Quaid's wife.
- Jessica Biel as Melina, a member of the Resistance who is Quaid's love interest.
- Bryan Cranston as Chancellor Vilos Cohaagen, a corrupt and ruthless dictator of the United Federation of Britain who attempts to ignite a full-scale invasion of The Colony.
- Bokeem Woodbine as Harry, who appears to be Quaid's workmate and best friend but is revealed to be an agent sent by Cohaagen to monitor him.
- Bill Nighy as Matthias, the leader of the Resistance. In the Director's Cut, he is also Melina's father.
- John Cho as McClane/Mac, a rep and tech at Rekall who offers Quaid the chance to experience an imagined adventure.
- Will Yun Lee as Marek, a factory worker who refers Quaid to McClane at Rekall.
- Dylan Scott Smith as Agent Hammond, a rogue UFB agent who helps Quaid.

== Production ==
=== Development ===
On June 2, 2009, Variety reported that Kurt Wimmer would write the script for the film. Mark Bomback was later brought on board, and James Vanderbilt did an uncredited "polish" on the script. Over a year later Len Wiseman was hired to direct. Paul Cameron is the film's cinematographer, and Christian Wagner is the film's editor. The soundtrack is a collaboration of Harry Gregson-Williams and Welsh electronica group Hybrid.

Although described in the press as a "remake," star Jessica Biel claimed in her August 2, 2012 appearance on The Daily Show that the film is not a remake of the 1990 film, but an adaptation of the original short story by Philip K. Dick. However, Biel's own character of "Melina" was not actually present in the original short story by Philip K. Dick and exists only in this film and the original 1990 film. The same is true for the characters of Cohaagen and Harry, along with the leader of the Resistance. This version of the film also uses the names Quaid and Lori for the main character and his wife, like the 1990 film, whereas in the original short story they were Quail and Kirsten. The basic story also follows that of the original 1990 film, albeit with certain changes such as keeping the action on Earth rather than Mars. Also, this version does not credit Dick as a writer.

In August 2010, Arnold Schwarzenegger expressed an interest in reprising his role as Quaid, but in October 2010 it was officially reported in The Hollywood Reporter that Colin Farrell was on top of the short list, which included Tom Hardy and Michael Fassbender, to play Quaid. On January 11, 2011, it was announced that Farrell had secured the role. Farrell stated in April that the remake would not be the same as Dick's short story. Schwarzenegger ridiculed the film in 2019 saying, "someone tried to do a remake of [Total Recall]. How stupid is that? Jesus!"

Beckinsale and Biel were both confirmed for roles on May 25, after actresses Eva Green, Diane Kruger, and Kate Bosworth had previously been considered for Biel's role. Actor Bryan Cranston was cast as the film's villain. Ethan Hawke was cast in a cameo role, and commented that his character had a monologue about five pages long; however, this role was cut from the theatrical version of film, but is part of the extended Director's Cut. Later cast additions included Bill Nighy and John Cho.

=== Filming ===
On a reported budget of $125 million, principal photography began in Toronto on May 16, 2011, and ended on September 20, 2011. Scenes were filmed at the Pinewood Toronto Studios, as well as the University of Toronto, Lower Bay Station, CIBC Commerce Court, the University of Toronto Scarborough, the Metro Toronto Convention Centre, and Guelph. The film was shot with Red Epic digital cameras and Panavision anamorphic lenses. After securing the film rights from Miramax, Columbia Pictures distributed the film.

== Music ==
The film score was composed and produced by Harry Gregson-Williams, with additional music performed by Hybrid.

== Release ==
Total Recall was released on August 3, 2012. The Director's Cut includes an extra 12 minutes of footage and there are several key differences compared to the theatrical version. In this version, both Hauser's memory and physical appearance were heavily altered by the UFB to turn him into Quaid, and an uncredited Ethan Hawke portrays Hauser's original appearance in a pre-recorded hologram video. Additionally, Hauser is still working for Cohaagen and plans to get close to Matthias by seducing Melina, who is the Resistance leader's daughter in this version. The Director's Cut ends with Quaid, on finding the real Melina, noticing that his forearm is missing the Rekall symbol he received earlier. Recalling Matthias' words, during their short meeting, that the past blinds us to the present our heart wants, Quaid decides to accept his current world with Melina as real.

== Reception ==
=== Box office ===
The film opened in 3,601 theaters and earned $25.8 million on its opening weekend; the film grossed $58.9 million in the United States and Canada and $152.9 million internationally, grossing $211.8 million worldwide against a production budget of $125 million.

=== Critical response ===
On Rotten Tomatoes the film has an approval rating of 30% based on 233 reviews and an average rating of 5/10. The website's critical consensus states: "While it boasts some impressive action sequences, Total Recall lacks the intricate plotting, dry humor and fleshed out characters that made the original a sci-fi classic." On Metacritic, the film has a weighted average score of 43 out of 100 based on 41 reviews, indicating "mixed or average reviews". Audiences polled by CinemaScore gave the film an average grade of "C+" on an A+ to F scale.

Joe Williams of the St. Louis Post-Dispatch wrote, "The richly constructed first hour is so superior to any feat of sci-fi speculation since Minority Report that the bland aftertaste of the chase finale is quickly forgotten." Roger Ebert of the Chicago Sun-Times gave the film three stars out of four; praising its details, he stated: "Total Recall is well-crafted, high energy sci-fi. Like all stories inspired by Philip K. Dick, it deals with intriguing ideas. It never touched me emotionally, though, the way the 1990 film did, and strictly speaking, isn't necessary." Michael Phillips of the Chicago Tribune stating that "the movie marches in predictable formations as well. But when Biel's rebel pulls over in her hover car and asks Farrell if he'd like a ride, your heart may sing as mine did."

Justin Lowe of The Hollywood Reporter wrote that "the outcome is engaging enough, although not entirely satisfying from either a genre or narrative standpoint, lacking both substance and a degree of imagination." Amy Biancolli of the San Francisco Chronicle wrote, "For all of its dazzlingly rendered cityscapes and nonstop action, this revamped Total Recall is a bland thing—bloodless, airless, humorless, featureless. With or without the triple-bosomed prostitute." Owen Gleiberman of Entertainment Weekly gave the film a "C", stating that "this one is somberly kinetic and joyless." Justin Chang of Variety wrote, "Crazy new gadgets, vigorous action sequences and a thorough production-design makeover aren't enough to keep Total Recall from feeling like a near-total redundancy." Peter Travers of Rolling Stone called it "totally witless" and said audiences should not expect comedic elements, originality, or coherence.

=== Accolades ===
Jessica Biel was nominated for Razzie Award for the role of Melina in the Worst Supporting Actress category.

== Other media ==
A 3D first-person shooter video game of the same name for iPhone, iPad and Android was released as a tie-in to the film.

== See also ==
- List of adaptations of works by Philip K. Dick
