= Foster's Release =

- Directed by: Terence H. Winkless
- Written by: Stephen Lorimore
- Produced by: Milton C. Hubatka
- Starring: Mary Burkin; Dan O'Bannon
- Cinematography: Stephen Lorimore
- Edited by: Stephen Lorimore
- Production company: Verexal Films
- Release date: 1971
- Running time: 14 minutes
- Country: United States
- Language: English

Foster's Release is a 1971 American short film directed by Terence H. Winkless. The film has been credited with inventing many of the tropes of horror later used in films such as Black Christmas, Halloween and He Knows You're Alone.

== Premise ==
It is a retelling of the common story of "The Babysitter and the Man Upstairs" about a teenage babysitter who, alone in a house at night, is harassed by a series of phone calls made by a psychotic killer. The police and phone company cooperate to try to warn the girl and save her.

== Release and reception ==
The film was featured at the Edinburgh Film Festival, L.A. Filmex and the Chicago Film Festival, among others. In Illinois, it is commonly shown to classes in home economics, for whom it illustrates the concepts of responsibility and deviancy.

The film was shown together with short films by John Carpenter in 2014.

== See also ==
- When a Stranger Calls
