= Iria: Zeiram the Animation =

1994 Japanese original video animation series

- North American DVD cover art by US Manga Corps

イ・リ・ア ゼイラム ジ アニメーション (I Ri A Zeiramu Ji Animēshon)
- Genre: Action, science fiction
- Original video animation
- Directed by: Tetsurō Amino
- Produced by: Masaru Umehara (Production Executive); Masato Terada; Yasuhiro Hibi; Hiroshi Katō
- Written by: Tetsurō Amino (ep. 1, 3); Naruhisa Arakawa (ep. 2, 6); Hajime Matsumoto (ep. 4–5)
- Music by: Yoichiro Yoshikawa
- Studio: Ashi Productions
- Licensed by: AUS: Siren Visual; NA: Discotek Media; UK: MVM Entertainment
- Released: June 23, 1994 – November 21, 1994
- Runtime: 30 minutes (each)
- Episodes: 6
- icon

Iria: Zeiram the Animation (Note: Japanese: イ・リ・ア ゼイラム ジ アニメーション, Hepburn: I Ri A Zeiramu Ji Animēshon) is a six-episode original video animation (OVA) anime series produced by Ashi Productions and directed by Tetsurō Amino. The series serves as a prequel to the original live-action film Zeiram, taking place several years earlier when the female bounty hunter protagonist Iria is still a rookie and detailing the events surrounding her first encounter with the unstoppable Zeiram. This does somewhat contradict the films, which imply that Iria's first encounter with Zeiram was in the first film.

== Anime OVA ==
=== Plot ===
The story begins with Iria as an apprentice to her older brother, Gren, a veteran bounty hunter, and his partner Bob, who work for Ghomvak Security along with a somewhat loutish hunter named Fujikuro. During a rescue mission to a hijacked spaceship called the Karma, they discover that the hijacker is actually a seemingly indestructible alien called Zeiram that broke out of the cargo hold during transit and began to massacre the crew. Bob is critically wounded by Zeiram while evacuating the survivors, and Gren is lost while attempting to kill Zeiram by destroying the Karma. Returning to Myce, Iria finds herself targeted by assassins working for Tedan Tippedai, the corporation that owned the Karma, and discovers a covered-up plot to control Zeiram in order to use it as a weapon. Iria escapes with the help of Fujikuro and reunites with Bob, who never recovered from his injuries but had his mind downloaded into a computer program. Together they continue to investigate rumours that Zeiram has appeared on Myce, and try to find out what happened to Gren, who also seems to have survived the Karma's destruction....

=== Characters ===
Iria (イリア, Iria)
Iria hails from the Batabitajira region of the planet Myce and is employed by Ghomvak Security & Investigations, a bounty hunting agency. She is something of a tomboy and is considered eccentric for her habit of wearing men's hair ornaments. Her hunter ID number is 9799-5. A hunter's rank is identified by the colour of a stone pendant which resembles a magatama. Iria's pendant as an apprentice is pink with two small dots on it, but when she receives her full license and ID number she is given a blue stone with three red dots on it. Although she is just a rookie at first and a bit reckless, Iria makes up for it with natural ability and a sharp mind. Her appearance in the OVA was designed by Masakazu Katsura, loosely based on the original designs by the creator of the Zeiram series, Keita Amemiya.
Gren (グレン, Guren)
Glenn ("Gren" in the English versions) is often seen as Iria's older brother and a full-fledged hunter. In episode 5 however, it is hinted by Fujikuro that Glenn might not be Iria's brother but is possibly her onii-san (a Japanese term used for both older brothers and close older male figures). He taught Iria much of what she knows about hunting and serves as a mentor for her apprenticeship. He wears a blue cloak and hair beads which are similar to Iria's as well as an unusual pendant which is later found by Kay. Glenn is thought to have died in the explosion of the Karma in the first episode but is later found to have been assimilated by Zeiram.
Bob (ボブ, Bobu)
Bob is an agent of Ghomvak Security & Investigations and brings prime jobs to Glenn and Iria (and elementary jobs to Fujikuro). He often helps out on these jobs as well and is severely injured by Zeiram on the Karma job. Following his escape from the Karma his personality is transferred to a computer by Puttubayh. In his computer form (resembling a vajra though on Iria's personal com system his form is simpler, resembling two floating cones sandwiching a smaller sphere) he is retrieved by Iria and helps her on her missions.
Fujikuro (フジクロ, Fujikuro)
A jaded veteran hunter who claims to only grudgingly help Iria from time to time because he is promised money from Bob. However, as the show goes on, a softer side of him is shown, and it soon becomes obvious that he genuinely cares about her safety; he prevents Kei from going on her own against the Zeiram as well. He also resents that Bob frequently assigns the "good cases" to Glenn and Iria, while he's left with lesser cases himself.
While he shares the name of a character in the second Zeiram film, his relation to Iria and general personality are totally different. While the animated version is an older and sympathetic character, the movie version is a simple thief who uses Iria to help steal a rare artifact before being imprisoned by Bob.
Kei (ケイ, Kei)
An orphan child from the Shadow District (Shadow Zone in the dub) of the resort planet Taowajan. Originally thought to be a boy, she was revealed to be a girl by Fujikuro. She befriends Iria and idolizes her much like Iria idolizes Glenn. She helps Iria in her battles against Zeiram. She is something of a tech wizard (she can pilot the space shuttle better than Iria and rigs a portable forcefield device that was crucial in Iria's last fight against Zeiram).
Komimasa (コミマサ, Komimasa)
A second Shadow District/Zone orphan and Kei's closest friend.
Dr. Touka (トウカ, Touka)
A scientist, Zeiram expert, and the sole surviving member of the original research team. First mentioned by Bob (while confronting Puttubayh) in episode 1, he is not physically seen until the second half of the series when his ship (on its way to Myce with Kay and Komimasa also on board as stowaways) is hijacked.
Zeiram (ゼイラム, Zeiramu)
Zeiram is the ultimate being and virtually indestructible. In addition to being extremely powerful, Zeiram can generate imperfect clones of itself to assist in battle. Zeiram also needs to assimilate other life forms in order to sustain itself, but in doing so it is thought that Zeiram can learn whatever is known by the organism being assimilated. Zeiram is not a unique creature and other versions of itself are known to exist throughout the universe. Later in the show Zeiram attempts to contact other Zeirams in order to bring them to Myce.
Puttubayh (プットゥバヤ, Puttubaya)
The vice president of Tidan Tippidai Corporation and the person responsible for bringing Zeiram to Myce (and to a latter degree, Taowajan), with plans to use it as a weapon. Plans, foolishly divulged to his mistress in a chip stored inside a locket found by Iria on board the Karma and not shared by the corporation, which goes so far as canceling the rescue mission, stating that everyone on board (including Puttubayh and Bob) perished and now putting a bounty on Iria's head for her knowledge of the cover-up of his plans and the Karma incident.

=== Credits ===
Cast
Role	Japanese	English
Iria	Aya Hisakawa	Stacie Renna
Bob	Masaru Ikeda	Gary Suson
Gren	Juurouta Kosugi	Christopher Nicholas Yates
Fujikuro	Shigeru Chiba	Andrew Thorson
Kei	Mika Kanai	Terri Muuss
Zeiram	Wataru Takagi (grunts)	David Siegel (grunts)
Puttubayh	Mugihito	Al Muscari
Komimasa	Chika Sakamoto	Jason Harris Katz
Dr. Touka	Yuzuru Fujimoto	Oliver Wyman

=== Media ===
U.S. DVD release

- Iria: Zeiram the Animation, Episodes 1–6 (released July 14, 2000) (out of print)
- Iria: Zeiram the Animation Collection (released March 30, 2004)
- Iria Zeiram: The Animation Master Collection (released March 8, 2016)

U.S. Blu-ray release

- Iria: Zeiram the Animation Master Collection (July 25, 2023)

Original soundtrack

- Iria: Zeiram the Animation (released October 1, 1996)

Opening theme

"Tokete Iku Yume no Hate ni" (溶けていく夢の果てに; lit. 'At the End of the Melting Dream'), performed by Yayoi Gotō.

Ending theme

"Yume wa Toi Keredō" (夢は遠いけれど; lit. 'Although the Dream Is Far'), performed by SAEKO.

=== Anime reception ===
Helen McCarthy in 500 Essential Anime Movies called the anime an "excellent piece of science fiction", praising the character design. She stated that "the worlds feel truly futuristic and alien, the action sequences are convincing, the music is great, and a slowly emerging conspiracy plot is the icing on the cake."

The Encyclopedia of Science Fiction noted that Iria: Zeiram the Animation was well regarded upon its original release, although its English dub received a less favorable reception. In a retrospective assessment, the encyclopedia argued that the series had not aged particularly well, describing its plot and action sequences as adequate rather than memorable. However, it praised the animation, particularly its imaginative backgrounds and visual designs, which gave the production a distinctive style. It also observed that, as a prequel to the live-action film Zeiram (1991), the series introduced a continuity inconsistency, since Iria's earlier encounter with the titular monster is not acknowledged in the film.

== Video game ==
Hyper Iria
- Developer: TamTam
- Publisher: Banpresto
- Directors: Atsushi Kanao; Masaru Yoshida
- Producer: Yūta Kadohara
- Programmer: Kei Satomi
- Artists: Ken Aoki; Masato Hirai; Norio Takeuchi
- Writer: Keita Amemiya
- Composers: Kiyotaka Satou; Nobuhiro Makino; Shintarou Hirakawa
- Series: Zeiram
- Platform: Super Famicom
- Release: JP: October 13, 1995
- Genre: Action
- Mode: Single-player

Hyper Iria (Note: Japanese: ハイパーイリア, Hepburn: Haipa Iria) is a 1995 Japan-only video game for the Super Famicom. It is an action game based on Iria: Zeiram the Animation, although it does not seem to follow the storyline of the OVA very closely. The game is set in a futuristic science-fiction setting and stars a bounty hunter named Iria who takes various jobs and goes on adventures.

Gameplay screenshot

Stages are divided between action stages and shooting stages. There are five stages in total and stages can be chosen in any order.

Iria can choose many weapons in the game, including a bazooka. Some levels are objective-based. Clearing stages means earning money which can be used to power up your weapons.

The game was developed by TamTam based on the 1994 original video animation Iria: Zeiram the Animation.

Hyper Iria was released on October 13, 1995, for the Super Famicom, and was published by Banpresto. The game was released exclusively in Japan. In 2016, a fan translation of the game into English was released.

Upon release, four reviewers for Famitsu gave it a score of 21 out of 40. French gaming magazine Consoles+ gave the game a score of 84/100. In a retrospective review, Nintendo Life gave the game a score of 7/10.

Reception

Review scores
Publication	Score
Famitsu	21/40
Nintendo Life	7/10 stars
Consoles +	84%

Iria also appears as the main character in ZeiramZone for the PlayStation.
