= Dan O'Bannon =

American screenwriter, director and visual effects supervisor (1946–2009)

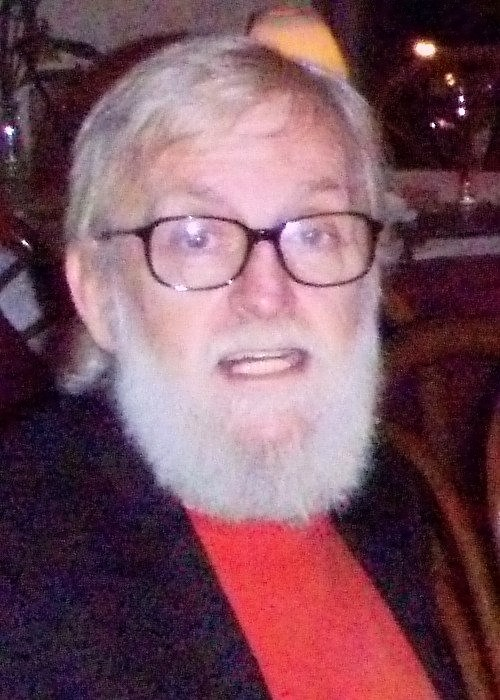
- O'Bannon in 2008
- Born: Daniel Thomas O'Bannon; September 30, 1946; St. Louis, Missouri, U.S.
- Died: December 17, 2009 (aged 63); Los Angeles, California, US
- Occupations: Screenwriter, director, actor
- Spouse: Diane Lindley (m. 1986)
- Children: 1

Daniel Thomas O'Bannon (September 30, 1946 – December 17, 2009) was an American film screenwriter, director and visual effects supervisor, most closely associated with the science fiction and horror genres.

O'Bannon wrote the screenplay for Alien, adapted from a story he wrote with Ronald Shusett. He also wrote and directed the cult horror comedy The Return of the Living Dead. He contributed computer animation to Star Wars and worked on cult classics such as Dark Star, and Heavy Metal, as well as the blockbuster Total Recall.

== Early life ==
O'Bannon was born in St. Louis, Missouri, the son of Bertha (née Lowenthal) and Thomas Sidney O'Bannon, a carpenter. During his childhood he was a science fiction and horror enthusiast. He attended the art school of Washington University in St. Louis, where he did stand-up comedy routines, did make-up for campus theater productions, and provided illustrations for Student Life, the student newspaper. While there he roomed with future movie producer Michael Shamberg. O'Bannon moved home briefly after Washington University and attended Florissant Valley Junior College where he wrote and directed a short science fiction satire titled "The Attack of the 50-foot Chicken." O'Bannon also attended MacMurray College in Jacksonville, Illinois. During this period he pursued a psychology degree, but later became interested in becoming a film director. According to O'Bannon, he was reading an issue of Playboy when he found an article discussing the best film schools, which led him to the University of Southern California (USC). He received a bachelor's degree in film from USC in 1970. While at USC he lived near the Los Angeles Campus in an old two-story house affectionately called the "Menlo Manor" which he shared with other USC students (Don Jakoby, who collaborated on several screenplays with Dan including Blue Thunder; and Jeffrey J. Lee). As a student, O'Bannon spent many late nights in old Hollywood editing his and other student films.

== Career ==
Dan O'Bannon in Dark Star, about to tranquilize a troublesome alien.

=== 1970s ===
It was at USC that he met John Carpenter and collaborated with him on a student film, which they eventually expanded into the feature-length science fiction movie Dark Star. Part of the movie was filmed at Menlo Manor. Released in 1974, it had a final budget of only US$60,000 (equivalent to $390,000 in 2025). O'Bannon served in a number of capacities, including scripting, acting in one of the leading roles ("Sergeant Pinback") and editing, for which he used a 1940s Moviola. In 1975, Dark Star won the Golden Scroll award (the Saturn Awards' original name) for Best Special Effects.

He was retained to supervise special effects for an Alejandro Jodorowsky production of Frank Herbert's Dune. That project fell apart in 1976 and the movie was never made, reportedly because the major Hollywood studios were wary of financing the picture with Jodorowsky as director. O'Bannon's role is prominently featured in the 2013 documentary Jodorowsky's Dune. During pre-production of the movie, he wrote and sketched out the comic book story "The Long Tomorrow", illustrated by Moebius. The comic had a significant impact on the science fiction genre. The collapse of Dune left O'Bannon broke, homeless, and dependent on friends for his survival. According to The Guardian, "George Lucas was impressed enough with his hand-animated, faux computer screen graphics to hire him to do similar work on Star Wars, but otherwise this was an incredibly lean period for him." He eventually abandoned technical film work for scriptwriting. While living with his friend Ronald Shusett, they came up with the story for O'Bannon's career-making film Alien (1979), for which he wrote the screenplay and supervised visuals.

=== 1980s ===
In 1981, O'Bannon helped create the animated feature Heavy Metal, writing two of its segments ("Soft Landing" and "B-17"). O'Bannon voiced his displeasure with his next big-budget outing, John Badham's Blue Thunder (1983), an action film about a Los Angeles helicopter surveillance team. Originally written with Don Jakoby, Blue Thunder also underwent extensive rewriting, losing some of its political content. He and Jakoby also scripted Lifeforce (1985), a movie based on Colin Wilson's novel The Space Vampires and directed by Tobe Hooper that veers from alien visitation to vampirism and an apocalyptic ending. It was not well received at the time, and was considered a box office flop. O'Bannon would again collaborate with Jakoby and Hooper for the 1986 remake Invaders from Mars. Purists considered it inferior to the 1950s original and it also performed poorly at the box office. O'Bannon also worked as a consultant for C.H.U.D., helping to create the design concept for the title creatures.

In 1985, O'Bannon moved into the director's chair with The Return of the Living Dead, a sequel to George Romero's Night of the Living Dead. Like Alien, the film met with success, spawned numerous sequels, and became a cult classic. That year, he was awarded the Inkpot Award.

=== 1990s ===
In 1990, O'Bannon and Shusett again teamed up as writers on Total Recall, an adaptation of the short story "We Can Remember It for You Wholesale" by Philip K. Dick. This was a project the two had been working on since collaborating on Alien. With a cast featuring Sharon Stone and Arnold Schwarzenegger, Total Recall earned well over US$100 million.

An earlier screenplay by the duo titled Hemoglobin was also produced as the low budget feature Bleeders (1997).

O'Bannon's second directorial feature, The Resurrected (1991), was a low-budget horror effort released direct-to-video. Based on H. P. Lovecraft's novella, The Case of Charles Dexter Ward, it focused on sudden changes in a man influenced by the writings of a long-dead ancestor. In 1995, O'Bannon received a co-writing credit for the sci-fi film Screamers adapted from the Philip K. Dick story "Second Variety", having written the initial version of the screenplay with Michael Campus in the early 1980s.

=== 2000s ===
In 2001, O'Bannon was the filmmaker-in-residence at Chapman University's Dodge College of Film and Media Arts.

O'Bannon and Shusett were credited as writers on the 2004 science fiction film Alien vs. Predator, a crossover prequel to Alien.

=== Posthumous ===
In 2013, Dan O'Bannon's Guide to Screenplay Structure was released, co-written with Matt R. Lohr. Dark Horse Comics published the five-issue comic series Alien: The Original Screenplay from August to December 2020 based on O'Bannon's original 1976 screenplay for the film.

== Personal life ==
Dan O'Bannon met his future wife Diane at USC during pre-production of Dark Star, they were married in 1986 and had a son, Adam. Dan O'Bannon had a physically abusive mother and was bullied in school. He had an interest in the UFO phenomenon at a young age.

== Death ==
O'Bannon died from complications of Crohn's disease in Los Angeles on December 17, 2009. His experiences with Crohn's inspired the chest-bursting scene from Alien.

== Filmography ==
Title	Year	Director	Writer	Other	Acting role	Notes
The Attack of the Thirty-Foot Chicken	1966	Yes	Yes	No	—	Short film
Good Morning, Dan	1968	Yes	Yes	Yes	Dan	Short film / Editor
Blood Bath	1969	Yes	Yes	No	—	Short film
Foster's Release	1971	No	No	Yes	The Killer	Short film
Dark Star	1974	No	Yes	Yes	Sergeant Pinback	Editor / Special effects supervisor / Production designer
Star Wars	1977	No	No	Yes	—	Computer animation and graphic displays: miniature and optical effects unit
Alien	1979	No	Yes	Yes	—	Visual design consultant
Dead & Buried	1981	No	Yes	No	—	Disowned by O'Bannon
Heavy Metal	1981	No	Story	No	—	Original segment for film: "B-17" / Adaptations: "Soft Landing" and ""Harry Canyon"
Blue Thunder	1983	No	Yes	No	—	
Blue Thunder	1984	No	Yes	Yes	—	Television series / Writer (episode: "Arms Race") / Story (episode: "The Island") / Executive story consultant (6 episodes)
The Return of the Living Dead	1985	Yes	Yes	Yes	Helicopter Loudspeaker Officer / Bum Outside Warehouse (voice)	
Lifeforce	1985	No	Yes	No	—	
Invaders from Mars	1986	No	Yes	No	—	
Total Recall	1990	No	Yes	No	—	
The Resurrected	1991	Yes	No	No	—	
Screamers	1995	No	Yes	No	—	
Bleeders	1997	No	Yes	No	—	
Area 51: The Alien Interview	1997	No	No	Yes	Interviewer 1989	Mockumentary film
Delivering Milo	2001	No	No	Yes	Clerk	
Alien vs. Predator	2004	No	Story	No	—	
Total Recall	2012	No	Story	No	—	Posthumous release

Also uncredited re-writer in Phobia (1980).
