= Bleeders (film) =

- DVD cover
- Directed by: Peter Svatek
- Written by: Charles Adair; Dan O'Bannon; Ronald Shusett
- Produced by: Julie Allan; Pieter Kroonenburg
- Starring: Roy Dupuis; Kristin Lehman; Rutger Hauer
- Cinematography: Barry Gravelle
- Edited by: Heidi Haines
- Music by: Alan Reeves
- Production companies: Fries/Schultz Film Group; Kingsborough Greenlight Pictures
- Distributed by: Fries Film Group
- Release date: 14 September 1997 (Fantastisk Film Festival Lund)
- Running time: 89 minutes
- Country: Canada
- Language: English

Bleeders (also known as Hemoglobin) is a 1997 Canadian horror film directed by Peter Svatek and based upon H. P. Lovecraft's story "The Lurking Fear". It premiered at the Fantastisk Film Festival Lund in Sweden on September 14, 1997, and was released direct to video the following year. It is the last original script written by Dan O'Bannon produced during his lifetime.

== Plot ==
John and Kathleen Strauss are a French-Canadian couple attempting to uncover the secret to John's rare blood disease. They encounter Dr. Marlowe, who is intrigued by the case. They are unaware that the Grand Manan Island in Canada's New Brunswick which they are about to set foot upon is home to the Van Dam family, mutant-like creatures who have become deformed and bloodthirsty from centuries of inbreeding. Their mutation began with their relative Eva Van Dam, who had an incestuous relationship with her twin brother. Also, they are fully functioning hermaphrodites, capable of reproducing with themselves. They need to survive on (dead or alive) human flesh.

John discovers that he is a Van Dam, born normal looking and taking part in normal society, but his rare blood disease can only be suppressed with human flesh and sex with his siblings.

== Cast ==
- Roy Dupuis as John Strauss / Van Dam
- Gillian Ferrabee as Eva Van Dam / John's Twin Sister
- Kristin Lehman as Kathleen Strauss
- Rutger Hauer as Dr. Marlowe
- Janine Theriault as Alice Gordon

== Reception ==
HorrorNews.net panned the film overall, criticizing it for its "abundance of clichés" and commenting that they would "be damned if there was anything in this picture worth seeing again". Moria gave the film two stars and stated that "one can see that a number of sequences have been designed on paper in a way that could have had some shock impact had they been directed by someone with half an ounce of talent."
