= Jeff Winkless =

American actor (1941–2006)

- Born: Jeffrey Alan Winkless; June 2, 1941; Springfield, Massachusetts, U.S.
- Died: June 26, 2006 (aged 65); Evanston, Illinois, U.S.
- Other name: Jeffrey Brock
- Occupation: Actor

Jeffrey Alan Winkless (June 2, 1941 – June 26, 2006) was an American actor born in Springfield, Massachusetts. Two of his younger brothers, Terence H. Winkless and Daniel Owen Winkless, worked with him on The Banana Splits Adventure Hour. He was also credited as Jeffrey Brock. He did voice-overs for several anime titles including Lupin the Third, Castle in the Sky, Nadia: The Secret of Blue Water, Wicked City and Vampire Hunter D. Winkless died of a brain tumor on June 26, 2006, in Evanston, Illinois.

== Filmography ==
=== Anime ===
- Honeybee Hutch (1970)
- Babel II (1973) - Yamazaki
- Lupin III: The Mystery of Mamo (1978) - Police commissioner / Boris
- Lupin III: The Castle of Cagliostro (1979) - Jodo / Interpol Chairman (Streamline dub)
- The New Adventures of Gigantor (1980–1981)
- Space Adventure Cobra: The Movie (1982) - Crystal Boy / Preacher Dakoba
- The Professional: Golgo 13 (1983) - Informant
- Megazone 23 Part I (1985) - Brian / Underground Hargan 2 / Team 11 / District 3D / Military Announcement (Streamline Pictures dub)
- Vampire Hunter D (1985) - Count Magnus Lee
- The Dirty Pair's Affair on Nolandia (1985) - Chief Gooley
- Noozles (1985) - Osgood / Spike
- Megazone 23 Part II (1986) - Guts (International dub)
- Windaria (1986) - Caleb / Court / Jim
- Castle in the Sky (1986) - Muska (1988 Dub, as Jack Witte)
- Maple Town (1986–1987) - Mr. Beaver
- Wicked City (1987) - Mr. Shadow
- Neo-Tokyo (1987) - Robot 444–1
- Twilight of the Cockroaches (1987) - Civilian / Commandant / Dad / Restaurateur / Walla
- Little Women (1987, TV Series)
- Grimm's Fairy Tale Classics (1987–1988, TV Series) - 2nd Little Pig
- Doomed Megalopolis (1988) - Yasanori Kato (Streamline dub)
- Crying Freeman (1988–1999) - Koh Takugen
- Ox Tales - Ollie Ox, additional characters
- Wowser (1989) - Wowser, additional voices
- Dirty Pair: Flight 005 Conspiracy (1990) - Chief Gooley
- The Secret of Blue Water (1990–1991) - Captain Nemo (Streamline dub)
- Silent Mobius (1991) - Lucifer Hawk (Streamline dub)
- 3×3 Eyes (1991) - Prof. Fuji (Streamline dub)
- Sangokushi (1992) - Kung / Chien / Dad / Assassin
- Crimson Wolf (1993)
- 8 Man After (1993) - Tony Gleck
- Casshan: Robot Hunter (1993) - Android BK-01 (Black King)
- Gatchaman (1994) - President Beolute
- Jin Jin and the Panda Patrol (1994)
- DNA Sights 999.9 (1998) - Trader Doctor

=== Animation ===
- The Dragon That Wasn't (Or Was He?) (1983) - Chief of Police Snooper, Bul Super, Marquis de Canteclaer (English version)
- The Stabilizer (1986) - Greg Rainmaker (English version)
- Wisdom of the Gnomes (1987–1988)
- Captain of the Forest (1988) - Zero / Eddie (English version)
- Aladdin and the Adventure of All Time (2000)

=== Live-action ===
- The Banana Splits (1968–1970, TV Series) - Fleegle
- Soylent Green (1973) - Suicide Parlor Receptionist (uncredited)
- Gone in 60 Seconds (1974) - Firebird Car Cleaner (uncredited)
- Free Ride (1986) - Waiter
- The Nest (1988) - Church
- Saturday the 14th Strikes Back (1988) - John Wilkes Booth
- Spaced Invaders (1990) - Captain Bipto (voice)
- Corporate Affairs (1990) - Businessman
- Zeiram (1991) - Bob / Storeowner
- Rage and Honor (1992) - Farmer
- Look Who's Talking Now (1993) - Dogs / Wolves (voice)
- Scene of the Crime (1996) - Len Mirkin
- Black Scorpion (2001, TV Series) - Auctioneer (final appearance)

=== Video games ===
- The Space Adventure (1991) - Crystal Boy
- Star Trek: 25th Anniversary Enhanced (1992) - Quetzelcotal
- Might and Magic: World of Xeen (1994)
- Inherit the Earth: Quest for the Orb (1994)
- Stonekeep (1995) - Scourge / Whispering Voice
