= Wanted: Dead or Alive (1986 film) =

- Theatrical release poster
- Directed by: Gary Sherman
- Written by: Michael Patrick Goodman; Brian Taggert; Gary Sherman
- Produced by: Robert C. Peters
- Starring: Rutger Hauer; Gene Simmons; Robert Guillaume
- Cinematography: Alex Nepomniaschy
- Edited by: Ross Albert
- Music by: Joe Renzetti
- Production companies: New World Pictures; Balcor Film Investors; Arthur M. Sarkissian Productions
- Distributed by: New World Pictures
- Release dates: November 21, 1986 (Florida); January 16, 1987 (United States)
- Running time: 104 minutes
- Country: United States
- Language: English
- Budget: $4,500,000 (US)
- Box office: $7,555,000 (US)

Wanted: Dead or Alive is a 1986 action film directed by Gary Sherman and starring Rutger Hauer as Nick Randall, the descendant of the character Josh Randall, played by Steve McQueen in the 1958 television series of the same title.

== Plot ==
Nick Randall is a Los Angeles-based bounty hunter and ex-CIA operative who is asked by a former co-worker to help track down terrorist Malak Al-Rahim, who bombed a movie theatre and later planned to release gas from a chemical plant similar to the Bhopal disaster. However, Al-Rahim is also looking for Randall, and Randall's employers tell him where to find Randall. This results in the death of his best friend, Sergeant Danny Quintz, and his girlfriend Terry, eventually forcing a showdown on the waterfront.

In the end, Randall brings out Al-Rahim handcuffed with a grenade jammed in his mouth. Randall explains to his bosses that they should send his payment to Quintz's family and he will keep the extra bonus for bringing him in alive. As he starts to leave, he says, "fuck the bonus" and pulls out the grenade pin. Al-Rahim's head is blown off and his decapitated body falls to the ground.

== Cast ==
- Rutger Hauer as Nick Randall
- Gene Simmons as Malak Al-Rahim
- Robert Guillaume as Philmore Walker
- Mel Harris as Terry
- William Russ as Sergeant Danny Quintz
- Susan MacDonald as Louise Quintz
- Jerry Hardin as John Lipton
- Hugh Gillin as Patrick Donoby
- Robert Harper as Dave Henderson
- Eli Danker as Robert Aziz
- Joseph Nasser as Hasson
- Suzanne Wouk as Jamilla
- Gerald Papasyan as Abdul Renza
- Nick Faltas as Amir
- Hammam Shafie as Chemical Expert

== Production ==
Rutger Hauer was cast as Nick Randall, the grandson of Josh Randall (Steve McQueen) from the 1958 television series of the same title. Gene Simmons was given second billing as Malak Al-Rahim.

== Reception ==
=== Critical response ===
Wanted Dead or Alive received generally negative reviews from critics. Review aggregator Rotten Tomatoes gives the film a rating of 30% based on 10 reviews, with an average rating of 4.19/10.

Janet Maslin of The New York Times wrote in her review: "Wanted Dead or Alive was a 1958 television series starring Steve McQueen. It has now, in the process of becoming a feature film, lost its colon, and that's not the half of it. Even to those of us who have become more or less used to the cultural cannibalism that passes for inventiveness these days, the film Wanted Dead or Alive, which opens today at the National and other theaters, will seem outstandingly unnecessary. It's not that the television show was sacrosanct; all it really had to recommend it was Mr. McQueen. It's just that producers wanting to make another latter-day urban Rambo should at least be expected to come up with something of their own."

Dave Kehr of the Chicago Tribune wrote in his review: "There are a fair number of people in this world--probably the majority --who wouldn't want to admit that anything as broad as a low-budget action movie could possibly fall under the category of good. But for those who can, Gary Sherman's Wanted Dead or Alive is worth checking out. It's a superior product in a genre that has seen some mighty hard times of late. Not that Sherman brings so many personal shadings to his direction that he tips the film over into the realm of art--as a director like Don Siegel could do with such movies as The Killers and Madigan. Sherman stays fairly close to the surface of his material, but in his hands, it's a brightly polished surface. His work is smooth, efficient and handsome."

=== Release ===
Wanted Dead or Alive was released in theatres on January 16, 1987. The film was released on VHS on July 28, 1994, by Anchor Bay Entertainment. Wanted Dead or Alive was released on DVD May 8, 2001, by Starz Home Entertainment / Anchor Bay Entertainment. The film was released as a double feature with Death Before Dishonor on December 7, 2011, by Starz Home Entertainment / Anchor Bay Entertainment. It was released on Blu-ray from Kino Lorber on October 1, 2019 featuring interviews with director Gary Sherman and actress Mel Harris, an audio commentary from Sherman and executive producer Arthur M. Sarkissian, and two theatrical trailers.
