= Phobia (1980 film) =

1980 film directed by John Huston

- Theatrical release poster
- Directed by: John Huston
- Written by: Peter Bellwood; Lew Lehman; Jimmy Sangster
- Story by: Ronald Shusett; Gary Sherman
- Produced by: Zale Magder
- Starring: Paul Michael Glaser; Susan Hogan; John Colicos
- Cinematography: Reginald H. Morris
- Edited by: Stan Cole
- Music by: André Gagnon
- Production company: Borough Park Productions
- Distributed by: Paramount Pictures (Canada/US)
- Release dates: September 9, 1980 (Venice); September 26, 1980 (Canada/US)
- Running time: 90 minutes
- Country: Canada
- Language: English
- Budget: $5.1 million
- Box office: $59,167

Phobia is a 1980 Canadian psychological horror thriller film directed by John Huston, with a screenplay by Peter Bellwood, Lew Lehman and Jimmy Sangster; from a story by Ronald Shusett and Gary Sherman. It stars Paul Michael Glaser, Susan Hogan, and John Colicos. In the film, experimental psychotherapist Dr. Peter Ross' (Glaser) patients are targeted by a killer that preys on their phobias.

The film premiered at the 37th Venice International Film Festival, before being released in Canada by Paramount Pictures on September 26, 1980, to a generally negative response and poor box office performance. This was the only horror film and the only Canadian-produced film of Huston's nearly-60-year career.

== Plot ==
Dr. Peter Ross, a psychiatrist, introduces a radical new therapy and tests it on five of his patients to cure them of their various fears (heights, crowded places, enclosed spaces, men and snakes). However, his patients start being murdered by an unknown assailant using methods relating to their respective fears.

== Cast ==
- Paul Michael Glaser as Dr. Peter Ross
- Susan Hogan as Jenny St. Clair
- John Colicos as Inspector Larry Barnes
- David Bolt as Henry Owen
- Patricia Collins as Dr. Alice Toland
- David Eisner as Johnny Venuti
- Lisa Langlois as Laura Adams
- Alexandra Stewart as Barbara Grey
- Robert O'Ree as Bubba King
- Neil Vipond as Dr. Clegg
- Marian Waldman as Mrs. Casey
- Kenneth Welsh as Sgt. Joe Wheeler
- Gwen Thomas as Dr. Clemens

== Production ==
Phobia was the only horror film directed by John Huston, and his only film produced in Canada. The film was shot in Toronto, with many scenes filmed at Humber Polytechnic College.

The screenplay was re-written during production by an uncredited Dan O'Bannon and Gladys Hill (John Huston's longtime assistant). In his book Dan O'Bannon's Guide to Screenplay Structure, O'Bannon claimed the script was altered without his input by a producer. He disliked the changes and offered to Huston his earlier draft, but Huston declined as a matter of convenience.

== Release ==
The film premiered in-competition at the 37th Venice International Film Festival. It was released in Canada and the United States by Paramount Pictures on September 26, 1980.

=== Home media ===
After years of being unavailable of home video, a remastered Blu-Ray was released in November 2019 by American boutique label Kino Lorber.

== Reception ==
=== Critical response ===
Los Angeles Times film critic Kevin Thomas described Phobia in a 1986 review as "the worst film ever directed by a winner of the American Film Institute's Life Achievement Award" after director John Huston received the honor in 1983.

Matt Brunson of Film Frenzy wrote "There’s so little sense of style in this film that Huston’s involvement must have solely consisted of yelling 'Action!' and 'Cut!' from inside his trailer." In a review for Blu-Ray.com, Neil Lumbard called it "the worst directing of John Huston's career."

Conversely, Diego Galán of El País gave the film more positive marks, writing "It's not a masterpiece, but it is an admirable work of craftsmanship."

=== Awards and nominations ===
Institution	Year	Category	Nominee	Result	Ref.
Avoriaz International Fantastic Film Festival	1983	Grand Prize	John Huston	Nominated	
Genie Awards	1981	Best Cinematography	Reginald H. Morris	Nominated	
