= Corporate Affairs =

1990 comedy film directed by Terence H. Winkless

- Home video cover art
- Directed by: Terence H. Winkless
- Written by: Terence H. Winkless; Geoffrey Baere
- Produced by: Julie Corman
- Starring: Peter Scolari; Mary Crosby; Chris Lemmon; Ken Kercheval; Richard Herd; Lisa Moncure; Kim Gillingham; Charlie Stratton
- Cinematography: Richard Gale
- Music by: Jeff Winkless
- Production company: Concorde-New Horizons
- Distributed by: MGM/UA Home Video
- Release date: 5 October 1990
- Running time: 82 minutes
- Country: United States
- Language: English

Corporate Affairs is a 1990 American comedy film starring Peter Scolari and Mary Crosby.

== Plot ==
An executive discovers that his former lover has given their company's CEO a fatal heart attack while having sex.

== Cast ==
- Peter Scolari as Simon Tanner
- Mary Crosby as Jessica Pierce
- Richard Herd as Cyrus Kinkaid
- Ken Kercheval as Arthur Strickland
- Chris Lemmon as Doug Franco
- Lisa Moncure as Carolyn Bean
- Charlie Stratton as Peter McNally
- Kim Gillingham as Ginny Malmquist
- Frank Roman as Buster Santana
- Sharon McNight as Astrid Hasselstein
- Jeanne Sal as Sandy
- Bryan Cranston as Darren
- Ria Coyne as Mistress
- Julie Glucksman as Miss Whitney
- Lisa Gressett as Savvy Coed
- Jamie McNary as Impudent Coed
- Terence H. Winkless as Party Hound
- Elena Sahagun as Stacy
- Devon Pierce as Lucy
- Terri LeTenoux as Consuela
- Chantal Marcks as Kimberly
- Jeff Winkless as Businessman
- Bill Frenzer as Ukrainian #1
- Stephen Davies as Ukrainian #2
- David Rich as First Paramedic
- Clay Frohman as Second Paramedic
- Nicole Tocantins as Ms. Withrow
- Tony Snegoff as Busboy
- Patrick J. Statham as Construction Worker
- Peter Exline as High Roller #1
- Charles Zev Cohen as High Roller #2
- Christina Veronica as Tanning Woman

== Production ==
Roger Corman arranged for the sets to be re-used in Hard to Die.
