= Lisa Langlois =

Canadian actress (born 1959)

- Born: March 15, 1959 (age 67); North Bay, Ontario, Canada
- Occupation: Actress
- Years active: 1975–present

Lisa Langlois (born March 15, 1959) is a Canadian actress who has appeared in movies, television and theater.

== Life and career ==
Langlois was born in North Bay, Ontario. She spent her childhood years in Hamilton, Ontario, where she attended a French language school becoming fluent in French. In 1974 she represented Hamilton in the Miss Teen Canada beauty pageant, where she finished second. Langlois graduated from McMaster University in Hamilton.

She made her film debut in Claude Chabrol's mystery Blood Relatives (1978) opposite Donald Sutherland. Chabrol also cast her in his next feature, Violette Nozière (1978). Langlois made a number of other films in Canada, including the thriller Phobia (1980), directed by John Huston.

She appeared in another 1980 film, Klondike Fever, and played leading roles in three films that have acquired cult followings: the horror film Happy Birthday to Me (1981), the teen actioner Class of 1984 (1982), and the killer rat shocker Deadly Eyes (1982).

After this work in Paris and Toronto, Langlois moved to Los Angeles to pursue American projects. She appeared in two Paramount Pictures comedy features: The Man Who Wasn't There (1983), a 3-D production, and National Lampoon's Joy of Sex (1984), directed by Martha Coolidge. In 1985 Langlois co-starred in the romantic comedy The Slugger's Wife, where she played a struggling singer and performed her own musical numbers after auditioning for Quincy Jones. She made guest appearances on television programs such as Murder, She Wrote in 1986, and she performed on stage in the La Jolla Playhouse's production of Once in a Lifetime in 1988. She played the heroine in Roger Corman's horror film The Nest (1988) and co-starred in an hour-long episode of Nightmare Classics, "The Strange Case of Dr. Jekyll and Mr. Hyde" (1989).

During the 1990s Langlois moved back to Canada. She worked steadily including parts in the action pictures The White Tiger (1995) and The Final Cut (1995), alongside Sam Elliott. She made appearances in the television series Beyond Belief: Fact or Fiction? (1998), Vengeance Unlimited (1999), and Relic Hunter (2000). After a brief hiatus she returned to the Los Angeles stage in 2004, starring in Jungle Express in Malibu.

More recently, Langlois had a co-starring role in The Perfect Marriage (2006), a thriller that premiered on Lifetime Television; in 2007 she had a recurring role in the TV series The L Word. In 2010, she appeared in Summer Eleven directed by Joseph Kell, her former co-star from Deadly Eyes (1982).

Langlois has a son, Emerson.

== Filmography ==
=== Movies ===
Year	Title	Role	Notes
1977	The Stowaway	Georgina	Short
1978	Blood Relatives	Muriel Stark	
1978	Violette	Maddy	
1980	Klondike Fever	Diamond Tooth Gertie	
1980	It Rained All Night the Day I Left	Suzanna	
1980	Phobia	Laura Adams	
1981	Happy Birthday to Me	Amelia	
1982	Class of 1984	Patsy	
1982	Deadly Eyes	Trudy White	
1982	Hard Feelings	Barbara Holland	
1983	The Man Who Wasn't There	Cindy Worth	
1984	Joy of Sex	Melanie	
1985	The Slugger's Wife	Aline Cooper	
1988	The Nest	Elizabeth Johnson	
1988	Transformations	Miranda	
1989	Mindfield	Sarah Paradis	
1996	The Final Cut	Sara	
1996	White Tiger	Joanne Grogan	
2008	Poe: Last Days of the Raven	Jane Stanard	
2010	Summer Eleven	Jenine	
2015	Relentless Justice	Gloria Curtis	
2022	Hotel for the Holidays	Madame Fontaine	
2023	Silver Fox	Joanna	

=== Television ===
Year	Title	Role	Notes
1975	Sidestreet		
1983	Hangin' In	Faye / Gail	2 episodes: "Love Is Deaf", "I've Got a Secret"
1985	The Edison Twins	Alison	1 Episode: "My House Is Your House"
1986	Murder, She Wrote	Kitty Manette	1 Episode: "The Perfect Foil"
1986	Doing Life	Rose-Ann Rosenberg	TV movie
1989	Nightmare Classics		1 Episode: "The Strange Case of Dr. Jekyll and Mr. Hyde"
1990	Father Dowling Mysteries	Carol Van Horn	1 Episode: "The Ghost of a Chance Mystery"
1994	Forever Knight	Laura / Marise	1 Episode: "Capital Offense"
1998	Beyond Belief: Fact or Fiction	Emma Jansen	1 Episode: "Count Mystery"
1998	Psi Factor: Chronicles of the Paranormal	Dr. Judith Taggart	1 Episode: "Absolution"
1999	Vengeance Unlimited	Helen Clemente	1 Episode: "Vendetta"
2000	Relic Hunter	Monica	1 Episode: "Fertile Ground"
2006	The Perfect Marriage	Carrie Hollings	TV movie
2007	Fire Serpent	Heather Allman	TV movie
2007	Framed for Murder	Diane Desalvo	TV movie
2006–07	Hank William's First Nation	Monique Savard	4 episodes
2007–19	Heartland	Marion Fleming	3 episodes: "Coming Home", "Full Circle", "The Passing of the Torch"
2008	The L Word	Andrea	2 episodes: "Liquid Heat", "Lunar Cycle"
2016	Our World Today	Pretty Funny Woman	18 episodes
2017	Mommy's Little Boy	Principal Reynolds	TV movie
2021	A Chance for Christmas	Wanda	TV movie
2022	Lemonade Stand Romance	Gladys McTavish	TV Movie
2025	The Perfect Setting	Miss Haenard	TV Movie
2025	Murdoch Mysteries	Ida McKay	Episode: "The Wrong Man"
2025	The Nanny Sees All	Vivian	TV Movie
