= Joe Renzetti =

American Academy Award-winning film composer

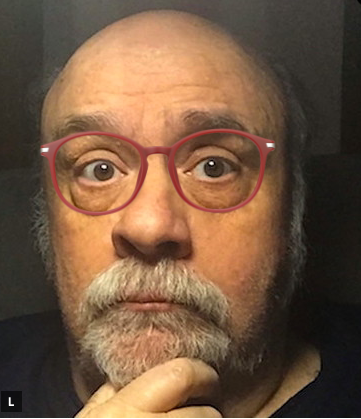

Joseph Renzetti (born January 4, 1941) is an American film composer and session musician. He has composed many scores for major motion pictures and network television. He has recently become active in scoring indie films. Renzetti also composes concert works for orchestra, chamber ensembles, and soloists.

== Career ==
Born in Philadelphia, Renzetti was inspired to a career in music by Dick Clark and American Bandstand, which was broadcast from Philadelphia. As he advanced in his career, Renzetti became the "house" guitarist for Cameo-Parkway Records, one of the two successful record companies in his hometown. Working as Cameo Records' house guitarist, Renzetti played on many hit records, including "Let's Twist Again", Dee Dee Sharp's "Mashed Potato Time", "South Street", "Limbo Rock", "Palisades Park", and "Tallahassee Lassie". Joe Renzetti was Gamble and Huff's first arranger, one of the originators of "The Sound Of Philadelphia".

Joe Renzetti relocated, first to New York City and then to Hollywood. In New York, Renzetti became very active as an arranger and conductor. He wrote and conducted on many hit records, including "Sunny" by Bobby Hebb, "98.6" by Keith, "Apples, Peaches, Pumpkin Pie" by Jay & the Techniques, and "Mandy" by Barry Manilow.

He was likewise successful in Hollywood where he created the score for the 1978 film The Buddy Holly Story. For this work, Joe Renzetti garnered an Academy Award for Best Adaptation Score.

== Filmography ==
- The Buddy Holly Story (1978)
- Elvis (1979)
- Fatso (1980)
- The Exterminator (1980)
- Dead & Buried (1981)
- Under the Rainbow (1981)
- Vice Squad (1982)
- Wanted: Dead or Alive (1986)
- Poltergeist III (1988)
- Child's Play (1988)
- Lisa (1989)
- Basket Case 2 (1990)
- Frankenhooker (1990)
- Basket Case 3: The Progeny (1991)

== List of selected works ==
- "Waltz" for Blues-Harmonica and Orchestra
- "Echo" for Classical Guitar Quartet
- "On a Chord By Kessel" for Classical Guitar Quartet
- "Holiday Furioso" Scherzo for Orchestra
- "String Quartet in F" - "American"
- "First Chair" A Concerto for Orchestra
- "The 1912 Overture" for Jazz Piano solo and Orchestra
- "Concerto for Three Guitars and Orchestra"
- "Blues, for me?"

== Partial list of arranged records ==
- "Sunny" (composer Bobby Hebb's recording)
- "Mandy" (Barry Manilow's version of "Brandy")
- "98.6" (Keith)
- "Apples, Peaches, Pumpkin Pie" (Jay & the Techniques)

== Awards ==
- Academy Award for Best Adaptation Score – The Buddy Holly Story (1978)
- Gold Record for "Sunny" by Bobby Hebb
- Gold Record for "Mandy" by Barry Manilow
- Nomination for a Golden Raspberry Award for Worst Musical Score – Under the Rainbow (1981)
