= Gary Sherman (director) =

American film director (born 1945)

- Born: August 28, 1945 (age 81); Chicago, Illinois, U.S.
- Occupations: Film director, screenwriter, film producer
- Years active: 1966–present

Gary Sherman (born 28 August 1945) is an American film director, screenwriter, and producer from Chicago, Illinois. He is best known for his work in the horror film genre, directing films such as Death Line, Dead & Buried, and Poltergeist III.

== Life and career ==
Sherman began his career directing short films, commercials, industrials, and documentaries while still an undergraduate at IIT's Institute of Design. Disgusted by what he saw in the 1968 Democratic National Convention, Sherman moved to London, England and elected to stay there for a time to direct commercials fulltime. Jonathan Demme operated a production company with Sherman in London and helped in what ended up becoming Death Line (1972), Sherman's debut as a feature filmmaker that was inspired by his irritation with British classism and the legend of Sawney Bean.

In 1979 Sherman filmed the television movie Mysterious Two based on the exploits of Marshall Applewhite and Bonnie Nettles, the then relatively unknown leaders of the Heaven's Gate cult, though it was not aired until 1982.

Upon relocating to Los Angeles, California, he continued writing and collaborating on many feature scripts. He also wrote and directed several television pilots. Avco-Embassy producer Ronald Shusett asked Sherman to direct the 1981 horror film Dead & Buried, and Sherman followed that film with the action-thriller Vice Squad shot by Stanley Kubrick's DP John Alcott. Like Death Line, these films often polarized critics and audiences and have since gone on to become genre classics.

Next he co-wrote and directed the thriller Wanted: Dead or Alive starring Rutger Hauer and Gene Simmons. Teamed with Gene, the award-winning Rock Against Drugs public service campaign for MTV came about as well as the pilot for the ABC series Sable.

His next project was Poltergeist III for MGM, which was shot on location in Chicago between April–June 1987 (with a theatrical release scheduled for June, 1988). After the completed film was rated PG by the MPAA in November 1987, Sherman and the studio decided to re-shoot at least part of the ending with a different special effects sequence. Planning and design for the new SFX make-ups took place between December 1987 and January 1988, with a possible shooting date set for early February. However, Heather O'Rourke, the child star of the film, died on February 1. Initially Sherman did not want to complete the film, but pressure from the studio prevailed, and the entire ending was re-shot in March, 1988 using a body double stand in for O'Rourke. In April, a re-edited version of the film including the new ending was submitted to the MPAA, after which it received a PG-13 rating. The finished film proved to be a critical and box office failure. Sherman has said that although he is proud of portions of the movie (particularly the creative use of mechanical "in camera" effects instead of the traditional optical effects often seen in movies of that genre), it is the least favorite of his films.

After Poltergeist III, Sherman did a string of TV pilots and television films that he wrote, produced and/or directed, as well as writing and directing the thriller Lisa for MGM.

Sherman went on to produce, direct, and write the pilot for the ABC TV series Missing Persons. After producing that series for its duration, he went on to co-executive produce the MGM/Showtime series Poltergeist: The Legacy.

For New Line Cinema and Fox TV, Sherman wrote and was executive producer for the film The Glow as well as penning the script Toxic Love, also for Fox TV.

Since 2000, when Death Line was chosen by a panel of British critics as one of "The Ten Most Important British Horror Films of the 20th Century" then was subsequently screened at Lincoln Center, many fans, including one of his most ardent, director Guillermo del Toro, have been trying to get Sherman to return to his roots, directing horror. But except for a 2006 foray into an experiment with new media, 39 - A Film by Carroll McKane, he is concentrating on areas that do not involve "dead, kill or maim."

In 2007, Sherman began teaching producing and directing classes at Columbia College Chicago.

== Filmography ==
=== Theatrical films ===
Year	Title	Director	Writer	Producer	Notes
1966	The Legend of Bo Diddley	Yes			Documentary short film
1972	Death Line	Yes	Story		Directorial debut
1980	Phobia		Story		
1981	Dead & Buried	Yes			
1982	Vice Squad	Yes	Uncredited		
1986	Wanted: Dead or Alive	Yes	Yes		
1988	Poltergeist III	Yes	Yes	Executive	Also special visual effects designer
1990	Lisa	Yes	Yes	Yes	
2006	39: A Film by Carroll McKane	Yes		Yes	
2015	Serving Time	Yes			Documentary film

=== Television films ===
Year	Title	Director	Writer	Executive Producer	Notes
1979	Mysterious Island of Beautiful Women		Yes		
1982	Mysterious Two	Yes	Yes		
1984	The Streets	Yes	Yes		
1989	Fire and Rain		Yes		
1990	After the Shock	Yes	Yes	Yes	
1991	Murderous Vision	Yes		Yes	
2002	The Glow		Yes	Yes	
2012	Amy's Book Hunt with Amy Brent	Yes		Yes	Short film

=== Television series ===
Year	Title	Director	Writer	Executive Producer	Notes
1987	Sable	Yes	Yes	Yes	Episode "Toy Gun"
1993-1994	Missing Persons	Yes	Yes	Yes	Created, written and produced 17 episodes (directed 6 episodes)
1996	Barefoot in Paradise		Yes	Yes	Urknown episodes
1997	Poltergeist: The Legacy	Yes	Yes	Yes	20 episodes (directed episode "Let Sleeping Demons Lie" / written episode "The Gift")
1998	Wind on Water	Yes			Urknown episodes
2000	First Wave		Yes		Episode "Still at Large"
2011-2012	The First 48: Missing Persons	Yes		Yes	6 episodes
