= Sable (TV series) =

American mystery crime drama television series

- Genre: Crime; Action; Adventure; Neo-noir; Mystery
- Based on: Jon Sable: Freelance by Mike Grell
- Developed by: Gary Sherman
- Starring: Lewis Van Bergen
- Country of origin: United States
- Original language: English
- No. of seasons: 1
- No. of episodes: 7

Production
- Running time: 60 minutes
- Production companies: Sherman-Rosetti Productions; Taft Entertainment Television

Original release
- Network: ABC
- Release: November 7, 1987 – January 2, 1988

Sable is an American mystery crime drama television series that aired on ABC from November 7, 1987, to January 2, 1988, during the 1987–1988 season, and is based on the comic book, Jon Sable: Freelance, by Mike Grell. Seven episodes of the series aired.

The show was a one-hour adventure/drama about mercenary and vigilante Jon Sable (Lewis Van Bergen), who by day was children's book author Nicholas Fleming. The program ran on Saturdays at 8:00 and aired its final episode on January 2, 1988. Rene Russo had her first television role in the series. Lara Flynn Boyle also had one of her first acting roles playing a kidnapped girl in the series pilot.

KISS frontman Gene Simmons is a fan of the comic and purchased the rights to the series earlier in his career with the hope of turning it into a big action movie with Pierce Brosnan as the lead. Simmons even starred in the lead role in an unaired pilot for the eventual TV show.

== Cast ==
- Lewis Van Bergen as Jon Sable
- Rene Russo as Eden Kendell
- Ken Page as Joe "Cheesecake" Tyson
- Holly Fulger as Myke Blackmon
- Marge Kotlisky as Cynthia
- John Harkins as Thomas Watertson

== Episodes ==
No.	Title	Directed by	Written by	Original release date
1	"Toy Gun"	Gary Sherman	Gary Sherman	November 7, 1987
Series pilot. Sable helps a toy manufacturer whose kidnapped granddaughter's captors are trying to force him to commit suicide in exchange for her life. But as Sable investigates, he finds more going on than he realized.
2	"Hunt"	Ron Rapiel	Story by : Allan R. Folsom; Teleplay by : Steve Feke & Gary Sherman & Allan R. Folsom	November 14, 1987
The son of the man Sable killed comes to Chicago with the intent to kill Sable.
3	"Evangelist"	Robert Becker	Jim Trombetta	November 21, 1987
The discovery of a young orphan girl in the apartment of a client leads to Sable uncovering a baby-selling scheme at the orphanage...and a murder tied to it. Zelda Rubinstein guest stars.
4	"Serial Killer"	Gary Sherman	Story by : Michael Halperin & Steve Feke & Gary Sherman; Teleplay by : Judy Burns	November 28, 1987
Sable is asked to protect the latest target of a serial killer...by the killer himself.
5	"Copycat"	Robert Becker	Arthur David Weingarten & Steve Feke & Gary Sherman	December 5, 1987
Someone posing as Sable begins taking down those he deems "garbage".
6	"Watchdogs"	Kees Van Oostrum	Story by : Gary Sherman; Teleplay by : Steve Feke	December 12, 1987
Cheesecake turns to Sable for help when a neighborhood watch group goes after minorities, just as Sable's estranged stepmother comes to town.
7	"Mob"	Gary Sherman	Story by : Ron Koziol; Teleplay by : Steve Feke	January 2, 1988
An old friend, who also happens to be a thief, needs Sable's protection when a mobster whose safe was robbed begins targeting other thieves.
