= Missing Persons (TV series) =

- Genre: Crime drama
- Created by: Peter Lance; Gary Sherman
- Starring: Daniel J. Travanti; Erik King; Juan Ramírez; Frederick Weller; Jorja Fox; Robert Swan; Patty Lombard
- Composer: Joe Renzetti
- Country of origin: United States
- Original language: English
- No. of seasons: 1
- No. of episodes: 17

Production
- Executive producers: Stephen J. Cannell; Gary Sherman
- Running time: 60 minutes
- Production companies: Gary Sherman Productions; Stephen J. Cannell Productions

Original release
- Network: ABC
- Release: August 30, 1993 – February 17, 1994

Missing Persons is an American crime drama television series, set in Chicago. It followed a fictitious missing persons unit; each episode usually following the investigation into three or more cases. It ran on ABC from August 30, 1993 to February 17, 1994.

It was produced by Gary Sherman Productions in association with Stephen J. Cannell Productions, and often used local Chicago-based actors, as well as occasional guest stars such as Nina Foch, Eddie Bracken, and Lois Smith. Semi-regulars included Ian Gomez, Irma P. Hall, Laura Cerón and Valerie Harper. Unlike most Cannell's series, he did neither creates nor co-create this series.

== Regular cast ==
- Daniel J. Travanti: Lieutenant who heads the Missing Persons Unit, Ray McAuliffe
- Erik King: Missing Persons Unit Investigator, Bobby Davison
- Juan Ramírez: Missing Persons Unit Sergeant, Carlos Marrone
- Frederick Weller: Missing Persons Unit Investigator, Johnny Sandowski
- Jorja Fox: Missing Persons Unit Police Officer, Connie Karadzic
- Robert Swan: Missing Persons Unit Secretary, Dan Manaher
- Paty Lombard: Wife of Ray McAuliffe, Barbara McAuliffe
- Al Hoffman: core-group, detective, Justin McCarthy (un-credited)

Among the guest stars was Stephen Colbert in episode 2.

== Episodes ==
No.	Title	Directed by	Written by	Original release date
1	"Pilot"	Gary Sherman	Gary Sherman	August 30, 1993
2	"Pilot"	Gary Sherman	Gary Sherman	August 30, 1993
3	"Cabe, What Kind of Name is That?"	Gary Sherman	Gary Sherman & Steve Feke	September 23, 1993
4	"People Don't Talk to Cops, People Lie to Cops"	Christopher Leitch	Gary Sherman & Steve Feke	September 30, 1993
5	"I Can't Even Imagine"	Deborah Reinisch	Story by : Gary Sherman & Steve Feke; Teleplay by : Eric Estrin & Michael Berlin	October 7, 1993
6	"That's My Sister, Pal"	Gary Sherman	Gary Sherman & Steve Feke	October 14, 1993
7	"The Man's an Emotional Termite"	Mark Sobel	Story by : Gary Sherman & Steve Feke; Teleplay by : Emily Tracy	October 28, 1993
8	"Some People's Priorities"	Mark Sobel	Story by : Gary Sherman & Steve Feke; Teleplay by : Mark Levin	November 4, 1993
9	"I'm Gonna Miss Him Too..."	Christopher Leitch	Gary Sherman & Steve Feke	November 11, 1993
10	"Sometimes You Can't Help Getting Involved..."	Mark Sobel	Gary Sherman & Steve Feke	November 25, 1993
11	"Right Neighborhood...Wrong Door"	Christopher Leitch	Story by : Gary Sherman & Steve Feke; Teleplay by : Mark Levin & Denise DeClue	December 2, 1993
12	"How Hard Is It Just to Get Off at the Next Exit?"	Ellen S. Pressman	Gary Sherman & Steve Feke	December 16, 1993
13	"If You Could Pick Your Own Parents..."	Christopher Leitch	Story by : Gary Sherman & Steve Feke; Teleplay by : Michael Berlin & Eric Estrin & Denise DeClue	January 6, 1994
14	"I've Got a Siren!..."	Ellen S. Pressman	Story by : Gary Sherman & Steve Feke; Teleplay by : Denise DeClue	January 13, 1994
15	"My Beautiful Son is Okay..."	Gary Sherman	Gary Sherman & Steve Feke	January 20, 1994
16	"All They Had to Do Was Ask..."	Christopher Leitch	Story by : Gary Sherman & Steve Feke; Teleplay by : Rick Hull	February 3, 1994
17	"Tell Me You Didn't Do It... I'll Go to the Wall for You"	Gary Sherman	Gary Sherman & Steve Feke	February 10, 1994
18	"What Do You Want... A Signed Confession?"	Gary Sherman	Gary Sherman & Steve Feke	February 17, 1994

== Home media ==
On July 27, 2010, Mill Creek Entertainment released Prime Time Crime: The Stephen J. Cannell Collection on DVD in Region 1. This collection contains 54 episodes from 13 different shows produced by Stephen J. Cannell Productions, including every episode of Missing Persons.
