= After the Shock =

1990 American made-for-television film

- Genre: Drama
- Written by: Gary Sherman
- Directed by: Gary Sherman
- Starring: Yaphet Kotto; Rue McClanahan; Jack Scalia; Scott Valentine
- Country of origin: United States
- Original language: English

Production
- Executive producers: Ross Albert; Gary Sherman
- Cinematography: Alex Nepomniaschy
- Editor: Ross Albert
- Running time: 100 minutes
- Production companies: Gary Sherman Productions; Wilshire Court Productions

Original release
- Network: USA Network
- Release: September 12, 1990

After the Shock is a 1990 American made-for-television disaster film that first aired on USA Network on September 12, 1990. Directed by Gary Sherman, the film is about the aftermath of the 1989 Loma Prieta earthquake that hit San Francisco on October 17, 1989.

The film was nominated for the Primetime Emmy Award for Outstanding Achievement in Choreography at the 43rd Primetime Emmy Awards.

== Cast ==
- Jack Scalia as Jack Thompson
- Yaphet Kotto as William McElroy
- Tuck Milligan as Terry Brown
- Richard Crenna as Patrick Wallace
- Rue McClanahan as Sherra Cox
- Paul Ben-Victor as Dr. Steven Brattesani
- Michael Clark as Capt. Bob Boudoures
- Gary Swanson as Lt. Pete Cornyn
- Scott Valentine as Gerry Shannon
- Brian Thompson as Tom
- Charlotte Crossley as Mother with Child
- Carlease Burke as Screaming Woman
- Clinton Derricks-Carroll as Neighbor
