= Terence H. Winkless =

American film director

- Born: Springfield, Massachusetts
- Occupations: Film producer, screenwriter, director, actor
- Spouse: Raly Radouloff
- Children: 1

Terence H. Winkless is an American producer, director, actor and writer of motion pictures and television, and a cast member of The Banana Splits Adventure Hour, playing Bingo the Gorilla, also a cast member in Trade Routes, and Goreyan Nu Daffa Karo, among others.

== Early life ==
Born in Springfield, Massachusetts, Winkless's family moved to Chicago's North Shore and Terence went to the New Trier High School in Winnetka, Illinois. His family then moved to Los Angeles to work on The Banana Splits Adventure Hour, on which he and his brothers played three of the four title characters, and their father wrote the theme song. Winkless attended the USC School of Cinematic Arts, and an internship at the AFI Conservatory on the film Soylent Green with director Richard Fleischer under the aegis of AFI consultant Charlton Heston.

== Career ==
Winkless directed the short movie Foster's Release in 1971, featured at the Edinburgh Film Festival, L.A. Filmex, and the Chicago Film Festival, among others.

Winkless worked on the original Gone in 60 Seconds (1974), which featured a 40-minute car chase. Winkless worked as an editor and then writer and director when the floundering story needed refinement.

Winkless got his first writing credit on The Howling (1981). Winkless would later direct the similarly themed The Nest (1988), featuring genetically altered cockroaches rather than werewolves.

Winkless' extensive body of work includes Bloodfist (1989), Corporate Affairs (1990) and The Berlin Conspiracy (1992). Given his success with the fighting film Bloodfist, the biggest hit for Roger Corman's New Horizons company, Winkless returned to the genre on the 1992 feature Rage and Honor.

Next came Not of This Earth (1995), part of the Roger Corman Presents horror series on the Showtime network. That same year Winkless directed White Wolves II: Legend of the Wild, followed by Ladykiller (1996) aka Scene of the Crime. He directed The Westing Game (1997) aka Get A Clue, made for Showtime and the Hallmark Channel.

His 2003 film Fire Over Afghanistan was shot on a prosumer digital camera, the Sony PD-150, and was a precursor to the all digital world to come. He next directed Nightmare City (2007), then returned to digital filming on Twice As Dead (2009).

In 2013, Winkless expanded on his usual genre and directed the family drama Heart of Dance (2013), in which a young woman become increasingly tangled in the obsessive world of professional dance following the death of her older sister.

Winkless continues to carve out new territory for himself as the author of the book The Assassin's Apprentice.

== Personal life ==
Winkless is married to screenwriter Raly Radouloff, they are based in Vancouver, BC with residences in California and Europe.

== Director ==
=== Television ===
- Mighty Morphin Power Rangers (1993–1995)
- Power Rangers Zeo (1996)
- Big Bad Beetleborgs (1996)
- Masked Rider (1996)
- Pacific Blue (1996–2000)
- 18 Wheels of Justice (2000–2001)
- Tide Waters (2014)

=== Films ===
- Foster’s Release (1971)
- The Nest (1988)
- Bloodfist (1989)
- Corporate Affairs (1990)
- The Berlin Conspiracy (1992)
- Rage and Honor (1992)
- Not of This Earth (1995)
- White Wolves II: Legend of the Wild (1996)
- Scene of the Crime (1996)
- Get a Clue (1997)
- Fires Over Afghanistan (2003)
- Nightmare City 2035 (2007)
- Twice as Dead (2009)
- Heart of Dance (2013)

== Writer ==
=== Films ===
- The Howling (1981)
- He’s My Girl (1987)
- Corporate Affairs (1990)
- Rage and Honor (1992)
- Fire Over Afghanistan (2003)
- Scorpius Gigantus (2006)
- Nightmare City 2035 (2007)
- Twice as Dead (2009)
