= Dead & Buried =

1981 film by Gary Sherman

- Theatrical release poster
- Directed by: Gary Sherman
- Screenplay by: Ronald Shusett; Dan O'Bannon
- Story by: Alex Stern; Jeff Millar
- Produced by: Robert Fentress; Richard R. St. Johns; Ronald Shusett
- Starring: James Farentino; Melody Anderson; Jack Albertson; Dennis Redfield; Nancy Locke; Robert Englund
- Cinematography: Steven Poster
- Edited by: Alan Balsam
- Music by: Joe Renzetti
- Distributed by: AVCO Embassy Pictures
- Release date: May 29, 1981
- Running time: 92 minutes
- Country: United States
- Language: English
- Budget: $5-6 million
- Box office: $216,166

Dead & Buried is a 1981 American horror film directed by Gary Sherman, starring Melody Anderson, Jack Albertson, and James Farentino. It is Albertson's final live-action film role before his death six months after the film's release. The film focuses on a small town wherein a few tourists are murdered, but their corpses begin to reanimate. With a screenplay written by Dan O'Bannon and Ronald Shusett, the film was initially banned as a "video nasty" in the U.K. in the early 1980s, but was later acquitted of obscenity charges and removed from the Director of Public Prosecutions' list.

The film made little money at the box office, but has received praise from critics regarding Stan Winston's special effects and Albertson's performance. In addition to the film being subsequently novelized by Chelsea Quinn Yarbro, the film has obtained a cult following in the years since its release.

== Plot ==
Amateur photographer George LeMoyne arrives in coastal Potters Bluff. Lisa, a beautiful local woman, offers to model for him. When he accepts her invitation to have sex, a mob of townspeople beats and immolates him. George survives the attack, but is later killed by Lisa posing as a nurse in the hospital.

The townspeople murder more visitors. Sheriff Dan Gillis—assisted by William G. Dobbs, the eccentric local coroner-mortician—works hard to discover a motive for the killings. Gillis becomes increasingly disconcerted as a grisly death occurs every day. In each case, the killers photograph the victims as they are murdered. Gillis's investigations are complicated by his wife Janet's bizarre behavior.

Gillis accidentally hits someone with his squad car following an attack. On the grill of the car, Gillis finds the twitching severed arm of the accident victim. The victim attacks Gillis and flees with the arm. After the attack, Gillis scrapes some flesh from the vehicle and takes it to the local doctor, who tells him that the tissue sample has been dead for approximately four months. Gillis grows suspicious of Dobbs and conducts a background check. He discovers that Dobbs was formerly the chief pathologist in Providence until he was dismissed 10 years before for conducting unauthorized experiments in the county morgue.

Gillis confronts Dobbs. Dobbs admits he has developed a secret technique for reanimating the dead, and all of the townspeople are reanimated corpses under his control. Dobbs considers himself an "artist" who uses his reanimated hordes to create more corpses for him to create art with. Even Janet is a reanimated corpse. When she appears in Dobbs's office, Gillis shoots and mortally wounds her, then shoots Dobbs. Gillis follows Janet into the cemetery, where she pleads with him to bury her in an open grave. After he does as she asks, the townspeople come to pay their respects.

Gillis returns to Dobbs's office to discover that Dobbs has used his technique on himself. Dobbs shows Gillis a film of Janet stabbing Gillis to death as the townspeople and Dobbs watch. As Gillis stares at his own decomposing hands, Dobbs offers to repair them.

== Cast ==
- James Farentino as Sheriff Dan Gillis
- Melody Anderson as Janet Gillis
- Jack Albertson as William G. Dobbs
- Dennis Redfield as Ron
- Nancy Locke as Linda
- Lisa Blount as Lisa
- Robert Englund as Harry
- Bill Quinn as Ernie
- Michael Currie as Herman
- Christopher Allport as George LeMoyne / Freddie
- Joseph G. Medalis as The Doctor
- Macon McCalman as Ben
- Lisa Marie as Hitchhiker
- Estelle Omens as Betty
- Barry Corbin as Phil
- Michael Pataki as Sam
- Glenn Morshower as Jimmy

== Production ==
According to Sherman, Ronald Shusett approached him one day at home about wanting to work with him, having loved Death Line enough to get his address through a mutual friend. He approached him with a pile of scripts to read and one of them was Dead & Buried, which he stated he liked "two thirds of it", save for the explanation about the body resurrection. Apparently, Shusett agreed with this while O'Bannon did not, which led to the latter separating himself from the film. The success of Shusett and Bannon's script for Alien (1979) soon helped get a deal for Dead & Buried to be made; Sherman stated that to him, the film was "clearly an allegory. It’s not meant to be taken literally."

In a 1983 interview with Starburst promoting Blue Thunder, Dan O'Bannon disowned the film, claiming that Ronald Shusett had actually written it by himself, but needed O'Bannon's name on the project, promising that he would implement some of O'Bannon's changes. Upon seeing the finished film, O'Bannon realised that Shusett had not included his material, but it was too late for him to take his name off the credits.

The opening shot depicting the central street scene in Potters Bluff was filmed along Lansing Street in Mendocino, California.

== Critical reception ==
Rotten Tomatoes reports a 71% approval rating based on 17 reviews, with a weighted average of 6.4/10. Metacritic, which uses a weighted average, assigned the film a score of 71 out of 100, based on 7 critics, indicating "generally favorable" reviews.

Gene Siskel disliked the film at the time, calling it a "hideously gruesome thriller", and named it his "dog of the week" on the show Sneak Previews.

Writing in The Zombie Movie Encyclopedia, academic Peter Dendle said that the film "builds suspense effectively and plays its genuine twists well, so long as you don't ask too many questions of the everyone-is-in-on-it-but-one-person plot." Zombiemania: 80 Movies to Die For author Arnold T. Blumberg wrote that Dead & Buried "is another fine homage to the EC Comics style of horror, with a story that also echoes the structure of a classic Rod Serling Twilight Zone episode," adding that the film is "a late-night treat that works best with the lights off and no foreknowledge of what's to come." Glenn Kay, who wrote Zombie Movies: The Ultimate Guide, called it a "solidly entertaining picture" and praised the special effects work by Stan Winston. Film critic Matt Wavish noted the "feeling of total dread lingering over the whole film" and concluded that "Dead and Buried is a master class in sheer terror." Donald Guarisco of AllMovie wrote, "it's easy to see why Dead and Buried never found a big audience. It is too plot-heavy for those viewers in search of a shock machine yet too visceral for the viewers who appreciate subtle horror", but complimented its "blend of creepy atmosphere and gruesome shocks."
