= Jon Sable =

- Cover to Jon Sable Freelance #7, art by Mike Grell.

Publication information
- Publisher: First Comics
- First appearance: Jon Sable, Freelance #1 (June 1983)
- Created by: Mike Grell

In-story information
- Full name: Jon Moses Sable
- Abilities: Bounty hunter; Mercenary; Best-selling author; Athleticism (former Olympic decathlete); Master marksman (primary weapon: .45 ACP Broomhandle Mauser); Skilled knife fighter (carries two push daggers concealed in custom belt buckle)

Jon Sable Freelance is an American comic book series, one of the first series created for the fledgling publisher First Comics in 1983. It was written and drawn by Mike Grell and was a fully creator-owned title. The comic was one of the first of the independent and dark American superhero stories of the 1980s and "helped usher in the grim and gritty sensibility that came to define the genre." Beginning in November 2007, it was published as an online comic series by ComicMix.

== Publication history ==
=== First series ===
At a convention in the late 1980s, Grell stated that his idea for Sable was heavily influenced by Ian Fleming's James Bond novels as well as drawing on pulp fiction crime stories saying "something like a cross between James Bond and Mickey Spillane's Mike Hammer". Also, many of the stories of Sable's hunting exploits in Africa were influenced by Peter Hathaway Capstick's novels, while Grell also drew on his own military experience.

Jon Sable Freelance lasted 56 issues from June 1983 to February 1988 before being cancelled. While Grell wrote and drew all the covers, his last issue of interior art was #43. Late in this run Grell announced in the comic's own text pages that Tony DeZuniga would soon join him as the new artist. Just what happened to these plans is unclear, and soon the series was suspended.

=== Second series ===
Several months after the series was cancelled, Marv Wolfman began writing and Bill Jaaska drawing a new series called Sable, with Grell having no part. This series lasted 27 issues before cancellation. The cover to issue #21 featured early work from Steve Epting. Marv Wolfman abruptly left Sable after issue #23. Comic book fan Steve Kaye took over the writing chores for issues #24-27; fan favorite artist Tim Vigil provided covers for issues #23-27.

=== Mike Grell’s Sable ===
A third First Comics series, Mike Grell's Sable, reprinted the first ten issues of the original Jon Sable Freelance series. There was also a tie-in miniseries featuring one of the semi-recurring characters, a thief called Maggie The Cat, at Image Comics in 1996. Only two issues were released and the series was never completed. In 1997, Grell announced he would be writing and drawing the character in a new black-and-white Jon Sable Freelance from Caliber Comics, debuting in October, but the series never materialized.

=== Freelance: Bloodtrail ===
After the title's cancellation (and First ceasing operations), the character made cameo appearances in some of Grell's other titles over the years. He would not receive his own series again until March 2005, when IDW Publishing released the first issue of a new six-issue mini-series titled Jon Sable Freelance: Bloodtrail (originally announced as Jon Sable, Freelance: Conspiracy) written and drawn by Grell. IDW has also been reprinting the entire original run in a series of trade paperbacks.

=== Jon Sable: Ashes of Eden ===
A new series, Jon Sable: Ashes of Eden, began publication as an online series in November 2007, and was published as a 5-issue mini-series beginning in 2009 and ending in 2010.

=== Jon Sable: Rules of the Hunt ===
Ashes of Eden ended with a tease for another adventure titled Jon Sable: Rules of the Hunt, although only the title was revealed at that time. In 2019, Mike Grell revealed some inked artwork and a brief description of the project on his official website: "...the untold story of Sable’s first case… and nearly his last. An African hunter in the concrete jungle sets out after the deadliest prey." Rules of the Hunt was later released as a Kickstarter-exclusive bonus book alongside a reprinting of the incomplete Maggie the Cat mini-series.

== Fictional character biography ==
Jonathan Sable was a bounty hunter and mercenary who previously had been an athlete in the 1972 Munich Olympic Games. After witnessing the terrorist outrages at those games, he married a fellow athlete and they relocated to Rhodesia, where Sable became an organizer of safaris for tourists, and later a game warden. It was during this time his family was murdered by poachers. After avenging his slain family, Sable returned to the US and became a freelance mercenary.

He also has a double identity as a successful children's book writer under the name of "B.B. Flemm". Unlike many such characters, his literary agent is aware of his other identity's activities, but is most persuasive in enforcing his writing contract obligations as well.

== Legacy ==
Jon Sable Freelance was the third release from First Comics and the company's first from a high-profile creator, with the appeal of the comic even outlasting its publisher. The pioneering creator-owned comic was also one of the first of the independent and dark superhero stories of the 1980s and, as described in Critical Survey of Graphic Novels: Heroes & Superheroes, "helped usher in the grim and gritty sensibility that came to define the genre."

Publishers Weekly has described the series as featuring "an unstoppable hero, realism in the weaponry and settings, lots of beautiful women and a combination of action and detection."

KISS frontman Gene Simmons is a fan of the comic and purchased the rights to the series with the hope of turning it into an action movie with Pierce Brosnan as the lead. Simmons even starred in the lead role in an un-aired pilot for the eventual Sable TV show.

== Collected editions ==
The series have been collected into individual volumes by IDW Publishing:

- The Complete Jon Sable, Freelance (softcover):
  - Volume 1 (collects #1-6, ISBN 1-932382-77-1)
  - Volume 2 (collects #7-11, ISBN 1-932382-79-8)
  - Volume 3 (collects #12-16, ISBN 1-933239-39-5)
  - Volume 4 (collects #17-21, ISBN 1-933239-42-5)
  - Volume 5 (collects #22-27, ISBN 1-933239-68-9)
  - Volume 6 (collects #28-33, ISBN 978-1-933239-70-5)
  - Volume 7 (collects #34-39, ISBN 1-60010-045-7)
  - Volume 8 (collects #40-45, ISBN 1-60010-113-5 )
  - Omnibus Volume 1 (collects #1-16, ISBN 978-1-60010-694-1)
  - Omnibus Volume 2 (collects #17-33, ISBN 978-1-61377-109-9)
  - Omnibus Volume 3 (collects #34-56, ISBN 978-1-93988-808-2)
  - Omnibus Volume 4 (collects Bloodtrail and Ashes of Eden, ISBN 978-1-93988-809-9)
- Jon Sable, Freelance: Bloodtrail (collects Jon Sable, Freelance: Bloodtrail #1-6, ISBN 1-933239-72-7)
- Jon Sable Freelance: Ashes of Eden (collects Jon Sable Freelance: Ashes of Eden #1-5, ISBN 1-60010-677-3)

== In other media ==
=== Television ===
The first series also spawned a short-lived 1987 ABC TV series, called Sable. Seven episodes were filmed. The aired pilot also included Lara Flynn Boyle, as a kidnap victim, in her first acting role.

The TV series was notable only for its changes to the premise, and for introducing supermodel turned actress Rene Russo to audiences as one of the leads. In the TV series, instead of Sable being the public face and masquerading as a children's book author, "Nicholas Fleming" was the children's book author and Sable the mysterious masked do-gooder. Sable was wanted for murder in Africa, and the vaguely effete Fleming persona was the only way he could live safely in Chicago. A new character for the TV series was "Cheesecake" Tyson, played by Broadway actor Ken Page as a hacker friend who inevitably supplied exposition.

=== Novel ===
Grell wrote a prose novel featuring the character, simply titled Sable, which was published in hardcover in 2000 and in paperback in 2001. The book was partly adapted from early issues of the comic series, with some changes in chronology.
