= Mirai Ninja (film) =

- Theatrical release poster
- Directed by: Keita Amemiya
- Written by: Keita Amemiya; Satoshi Kitahara
- Based on: Mirai Ninja by Namco
- Production companies: Gaga Communications; Graphical Corporation Crowd Inc; Namco
- Distributed by: Pony Canyon
- Release dates: October 1988 (Tokyo premiere); December 2, 1988 (Japan video release)
- Running time: 75 minutes
- Country: Japan
- Language: Japanese

Mirai Ninja: Keiun Kinin Gaiden (未来忍者 慶雲機忍外伝; lit. "Future Ninja: Keiun Machine Stealth Side Story"), known as Cyber Ninja in the United States, Warlord in Canada and Robo Ninja in the UK, is a 1988 Japanese science fiction action film directed by Keita Amemiya, which was co-produced and released by Namco that premiered in October 1988 at the Tokyo International Fantastic Film Festival.

It is the first live-action film based on a video game, released five years before the 1993 film Super Mario Bros.

It was released as a direct-to-video film on December 2. The film is based on the arcade game of the same name which was also developed and released by Namco.

== Plot ==
In a future time a war is being waged between humans and cyborgs. One of the elite cyberninja of the enemy goes rogue and sets out to assist the royal family after their headstrong princess is captured and destined to become the final sacrifice needed to summon the cyborg legions digital overlord from another dimension. The resistance army sends a small band of soldiers in, among whom is a determined young man out to avenge the death of his brother at the hands of the robots. After suffering many losses and battling towards the enemy castle it is revealed that the cyberninja Shiranui is in fact the lost brother, transformed into the robot and now determined to regain his human body. The survivours must storm the technological castle and rescue the princess before the resistance army fires a super cannon to prevent the summoning of the electronic evil.

== Cast ==
Beverly Hills Video Group produced an English dubbed version of the film in 1994 directed by Carl Macek and distributed by Streamline Pictures for a 1995 release in North America.

Character	Original actor	English voice actor
Shiranui	Makoto Yokoyama	David Povall
Princess Saki	Eri Morishita	Juliana Donald
Akagi	Hanbei Kawai	Michael Forest
Jiromaru	Kunihiko Ida	Stephen Apostolina
Kajiwara	Fuyukichi Maki	Edward Mannix
Dark Overlord	Masaaki Emori	Kirk Thornton
Shogi	Mizuho Yoshida	Jeff Winkless
Bishop Raimei	Shohei Yamamoto	Mike Reynolds

=== Additional English dub voices ===
- Richard Cansino - Clansman
- Carl Macek - Shogi Subordinate
- Don Pugsley - Clansman
- Barry Stigler - Clansman
- Dan Woren - Clansman

== Release ==
The film was originally screened in Japan back in October 1988 at the Tokyo International Fantastic Film Festival for a premiere release and later first released on VHS by Pony Canyon on December 2. Later it was released in North America as Cyber Ninja for VHS on July 25, 1995, with an English dub, and on region 2 DVD in 2003 (Japan, Europe, Middle East, Greenland, and South Africa). The U.S. DVD was released in 2009.

== Reception ==
The film met with mixed reviews from Western film critics. It holds a 44% "Rotten" approval rating on Rotten Tomatoes.

Writing in the Montgomery Advertiser, Rick Harmon was highly critical of the film, saying it does not reach the level of Star Wars as promised by promotional materials and he criticized special effects.
