= Gunmen (1994 film) =

1993 film by Deran Sarafian

- Theatrical release poster
- Directed by: Deran Sarafian
- Written by: Stephen Sommers
- Produced by: Laurence Mark; John Davis; John Flock
- Starring: Christopher Lambert; Mario Van Peebles; Denis Leary; Kadeem Hardison; Sally Kirkland; Patrick Stewart
- Cinematography: Hiro Narita
- Edited by: Bonnie Koehler
- Music by: John Debney
- Production companies: Davis Entertainment; Gray Gunmen Productions
- Distributed by: Dimension Films (through Miramax Films)
- Release date: February 4, 1994
- Running time: 91 minutes
- Country: United States
- Language: English
- Budget: $10-11 million
- Box office: $3.4 million (US)

Gunmen is a 1994 American action comedy film directed by Deran Sarafian and starring Mario Van Peebles, Christopher Lambert, Denis Leary, Kadeem Hardison, and Patrick Stewart. Robert Harper and Brenda Bakke are co-stars of the film. It was second film collaboration between Lambert, John Flock and John Davis, after Fortress.

== Plot ==
Wheelchair user and drug baron Peter Loomis has his $400 million drug fortune stolen in South America by his errand boy Carlos, who stashed the fortune on an undisclosed boat in an undisclosed harbor. Loomis sends ruthless killer Armor O'Malley to find the boat and recover the money—he and sidekick Marie kill Carlos before they can get the name and location of the boat, but they learn that Carlos's brother Dani knows where it is, and set out to find him.

Dani is sprung from a South American prison by Cole Parker, a bounty hunter working for the DEA who is bent on taking down Loomis—Cole knows the name of the boat, Dani knows the location, and both men want the money for their own reasons. Complicating matters is a mole in the DEA who feeds intel to O'Malley about the heroes' movements. Alone and outnumbered, Cole and Dani are forced into a reluctant alliance as they quest for the 400 million dollar boat, with O'Malley and his men chasing them every step of the way.

Loomis quickly realizes that O'Malley wants the fortune for himself and tries to have him and his men assassinated, but the attempt fails. O'Malley returns to Loomis's estate and makes it clear that he now wears the pants in their relationship: without the $400 million, Loomis can't pay his soldiers, and O'Malley will get his hands on the money before the stay-at-home cripple does. Loomis is killed and O'Malley renews the chase with a small army at his disposal.

After numerous betrayals on both sides of the conflict, the chase ends at a Puerto Vallarta harbor, and a yacht called the "Matador" according to Cole. Dani and Cole shoot it out with O'Malley's soldiers and leave the boat a flaming wreck (and Dani beside himself at the loss of the money). But Cole reveals he lied about the boat name to mislead and eliminate O'Malley: the fortune was actually stashed on a rickety old fishing boat called the "Gunmen". The heroes agree to split the money and sail into the sunset.

== Cast ==
- Christopher Lambert as Dani Servigo
- Mario Van Peebles as Cole Parker
- Denis Leary as Armor O'Malley
- Patrick Stewart as Peter Loomis
- Kadeem Hardison as Izzy
- Sally Kirkland as Bennett
- Richard C. Sarafian as Chief Chavez
- Robert Harper as Rance
- Brenda Bakke as Maria
- Humberto Elizondo as Guzman
- Deran Sarafian as Bishop
- Christopher Michael as Rhodes
- Rena Riffel as Mrs. Loomis
- Big Daddy Kane as himself
- Kid Frost as himself
- Rakim as himself
- Eric B. as himself
- Doctor Dré as himself
- Ed Lover as himself
- Christopher Williams as himself

== Production ==
Following his writing and directing debut on Catch Me If You Can for Showtime, Stephen Sommers sold his Gunmen spec script to producers Laurence Mark and John Baldecchi at Walt Disney Pictures. Sommers briefly developed developed Gunmen at Hollywood Pictures until Mark and Baldecchi shifted Sommers' focus to The Adventures of Huck Finn and Gunmen was placed into turnaround.

The project was instead produced independently by Davis Entertainment who produced the film as part of a co-financing deal with Columbia-TriStar Home Video after previously partnering on the 1992 film Fortress which had proved to be a sizable financial hit, particularly in the international market. Dimension Films, the genre film label of Miramax, acquired the distribution rights to the film for the United States. Deran Sarafian was cast in and directed Gunmen because Christopher Lambert had enjoyed Sarafian's Death Warrant. Mario Van Peebles has said the film was something of an homage to The Good, the Bad and the Ugly with his character an analogue to Clint Eastwood's the Man with No Name while Christopher Lambert and Denis Leary's characters were an homage to Eli Wallach's Tuco and Lee Van Cleef's "Angel Eyes". Van Peebles has stated he enjoyed working with Lambert in spite of only occasionally understanding him and their experience on the film led to them reteaming in Highlander III: The Sorcerer.

Gunmen was filmed in nine weeks between April 20 and June 18 of 1992 in Puerto Vallarta, Mexico.

== Release ==
Gunmen was first released in Hungary on May 21, 1993. In the US, it was theatrically released on February 4, 1994.

Dimension Films also cut the film down by around five minutes before it was played on 800 North American screens. The film was originally much more hard-edged, featuring greater violence and language, and most of the cuts were made on those scenes because the studios wanted to make it a more accessible R-rated action film. The uncut version of the film was never released.

== Home media ==
Gunmen was released to DVD on June 22, 2001 by Front Row Entertainment. DVD versions of the film are in the cropped 1.33:1 pan and scan format instead of the 2.35:1 widescreen format in which the movie was originally filmed.

The original widescreen 2.35:1 aspect ratio cut is available for purchase digitally. There are two known DVD versions of Gunmen which present the film in its original 2.35:1 aspect ratio: the Japanese release from Columbia Tristar and a Hungarian version released as Fenegyerekek. All other versions of the DVD are only presented in a cropped 1.33:1 format.

== Soundtrack ==
The official soundtrack to the film, Gunmen (Music From the Original Motion Picture Soundtrack), was released on December 21, 1993 through MCA Records. The soundtrack consists of hip hop, reggae, rock, and R&B music.

=== Track listing ===
No.	Title	Writer(s)	Producer(s)	Length
1.	"Bite the Bullet" (performed by Kid Frost)	Arturo Molina Jr.; Antonio Gonzalez	Tony G.	4:32
2.	"Gunman" (performed by Big Daddy Kane)	Antonio Hardy; Michael Stokes	Big Daddy Kane; Michael Stokes	3:15
3.	"Heat It Up" (performed by Rakim)	William Griffin	Madness 4 Real	3:42
4.	"Time to Make the Dough Nutz" (performed by Young Black Teenagers)	Kamron; Firstborn; ATA; Thomas Barbaccia; Keith Boxley; Gary Rinaldo; Gary Lee Weinrib; Alexandar Živojinović; Neil Peart; Tye Dubois	Keith Shocklee; Gary G-Wiz	3:51
5.	"I Know You Got Soul" (performed by Eric B. & Rakim)	Griffin; Eric Barrier	Rakim	4:35
6.	"Love and Happiness" (performed by Morgan Heritage)	Al Green; Mabon Hodges	Morgan Heritage; Denroy Morgan	4:25
7.	"Run Through the Jungle" (performed by Los Lobos)	John C. Fogerty	Los Lobos	3:47
8.	"Stranger in My Life" (performed by Christopher Williams)	Adam Weiner; Gonzales Ozen	Christopher Williams; Robert Brown (co.)	4:32
9.	"This House" (performed by Cruzados)	Humberto Larriva; Charles E. Kaufman; Tony Marsico; Valerie Marsico	Charlie Midnight; Tito Larriva	4:08
10.	"Jungle Chase" (performed by John Debney)	John Debney	John Debney	0:58
Total length:				37:45

== Reception ==
Gunmen holds a 15% approval rating on Rotten Tomatoes based on 13 reviews; the average rating is 3.3/10. Emanuel Levy of Variety wrote: "Mindlessly cartoonish, Gunmen lacks the expected frills and spiteful tension of a serviceable actioner". Roger Ebert awarded it 1 and a half stars out of 4 and said, "'Gunmen' is a movie without plan, inspiration or originality - and to that list I would add coherence, except that I am not sure this movie would place much value on a plot that hangs together. The film's ambitions are simple: to give us a lot of action, a lot of violence, a few ironic lines of dialogue, and some very familiar characters."

=== Year-end lists ===
- Worst films (not ranked) – Jeff Simon, The Buffalo News
- Top 18 worst (alphabetically listed, not ranked) – Michael Mills, The Palm Beach Post
