= Pete Lopez =

Pete Lopez may refer to:

- Pete Lopez (politician), Republican member of the New York State Assembly
- Peter López (born 1981), Peruvian taekwondo fighter
- Peter Lopez (attorney), American entertainment attorney
