= Solar Crisis =

1990 film by Richard C. Sarafian, Alan Smithee

- Theatrical release poster
- Directed by: Richard C. Sarafian (Note: Credited as Alan Smithee.)
- Screenplay by: Joe Gannon; Tedi Sarafian (as Crispan Bolt)
- Based on: Crisis 2050 by Takeshi Kawata
- Produced by: Richard Edlund; James Nelson
- Starring: Tim Matheson; Charlton Heston; Peter Boyle; Annabel Schofield; Corin Nemec; Jack Palance
- Cinematography: Russell Carpenter
- Edited by: Richard Trevor
- Music by: Maurice Jarre
- Production companies: Gakken; NHK Enterprises; Japan America Picture Company
- Distributed by: Shochiku (Japan); Trimark Pictures (United States)
- Release dates: July 14, 1990 (Japan); November 25, 1992 (United States)
- Running time: 111 minutes
- Countries: Japan; United States
- Language: English
- Budget: $43 million

Solar Crisis is a 1990 Japanese-American science fiction thriller film directed by Richard C. Sarafian (credited as Alan Smithee). The screenplay was written by Joe Gannon and Tedi Sarafian (credited as Crispan Bolt), based on Takeshi Kawata's 1990 novel Crisis 2050; Kawata co-produced the film. The film was first released in Japan in 1990, and in the United States in 1992.

The cast features Tim Matheson as Steve Kelso, Charlton Heston as Admiral "Skeet" Kelso, Peter Boyle as Arnold Teague, Annabel Schofield as Alex Noffe, Corin Nemec as Mike Kelso, and Jack Palance as Travis. The executive producers were Takeshi Kawata and Takehito Sadamura. FX cinematographer Richard Edlund and veteran sound editor James Nelson served as producers.

== Plot ==
To stop a solar flare from destroying the Earth, Steve Kelso is tasked to drop an artificially intelligent bomb on the Sun from the spaceship Helios. Arnold Teague, who believes the danger to be overstated, attempts to sabotage the mission so he can profit from the panic. Teague's agents on Earth clash with Kelso's father, Admiral "Skeet" Kelso, and his son, Mike.

== Cast ==
- Tim Matheson as Captain Steve Kelso
- Charlton Heston as Admiral "Skeet" Kelso
- Peter Boyle as Arnold Teague
- Annabel Schofield as Dr. Alex Noffe
- Corin Nemec as Mike Kelso
- Jack Palance as Colonel Travis James Richards
- Tetsuya Bessho as Dr. Ken Minami
- Dorian Harewood as Captain Borg
- Paul Koslo as Dr. Gunther Haas
- Sandy McPeak as Colonel Gurney
- Silvana Gallardo as T.C.
- Dan Shor as Harvard
- Scott Allan Campbell as McBride
- Frantz Turner as Lamare
- Paul Williams as Freddy The Bomb (voice)
- Brenda Bakke as Dr. Claire Beeson
- Michael Berryman as Matthew
- Roy Jenson as The Bartender
- H.M. Wynant as IXL Executive #1

== Production ==
In October 1989, Solar Crisis began shooting, with an announced budget of US$30 million (equivalent to $80 million in 2025). Nippon Steel, one of the investors, announced a Japanese theme park based on the film. By January 1990, filming had completed on Solar Crisis, but by July 1991 it was reported reshoots had taken place.

Scientist Richard J. Terrile served as a technical advisor. He at first tried to convince the filmmakers to avoid sending a crew to the Sun, calling it unscientific. When it was explained to him that audience would demand such a plot point regardless of scientific accuracy, Terrile said he realized his job was to make impossible situations sound more plausible.

$7 million is estimated to have been spent on special effects. Pre-sales of the film was sold to Inter-Ocean Film Sales Ltd. in February 1990.

== Release ==
TV Guide quoted the final budget as US$43 million (equivalent to $110 million in 2025). The film opened in Japan in 1990, where it underperformed. In response, the producers extensively recut and reshot scenes to secure an American distributor. Sarafian had his name removed from the credits and replaced with the Directors Guild of America alias "Alan Smithee". Sarafian's son Tedi, who performed rewrites, was credited as "Crispan Bolt".

Producers Edlund and Nelson also brought in Rene Balcer to do uncredited rewrites.

The film was given a limited theatrical release in the United States on November 25, 1992. A home video release followed on March 17, 1993.

== Reception ==
TV Guide rated it 2/5 stars and wrote:

"Enjoy its awesome visuals or scorn its slipshod execution, Solar Crisis amounts to one small step for cinema, one giant leap for Alan Smithee."

== See also ==
- Solar Attack (2006), a direct-to-video film by Lions Gate Entertainment with a somewhat similar plot
- Sunshine (2007), a film with a similar premise of dropping a bomb into the Sun to save the Earth
- Sun in culture

== Bibliography ==
- Kawata, Takeshi (1990). Crisis 2050.
