= Seven Hours to Judgment =

1988 film

- Theatrical release poster
- Directed by: Beau Bridges
- Written by: Walter Davis; Elliot Stephens
- Produced by: Mort Abrahams
- Starring: Beau Bridges; Ron Leibman; Julianne Phillips
- Edited by: Bill Butler
- Music by: John Debney
- Distributed by: Trans World Entertainment
- Release date: September 16, 1988
- Running time: 90 minutes
- Country: United States
- Language: English

Seven Hours to Judgment is a 1988 film directed by and starring Beau Bridges. It was produced by Mort Abrahams and written by Walter Davis and Steven E. de Souza (under his pseudonym Elliot Stephens). The film also stars Ron Leibman and Julianne Phillips.

== Plot ==
In Los Angeles, Judge John Eden (Beau Bridges) is presiding over the preliminary hearing of four gang members—members of the Ice Men Gang—who brutally robbed Ellen Reardon (Sandra Lee Gimpel), pushed her into the path of a subway train, and left her to fight for her life. John had already set some of the gang's members free in a previous case.

Ellen's husband, David Reardon (Ron Leibman), pleads to have the hearing delayed because he has found evidence that can put the gangbangers away, but the evidence is in the hands of a rival gang.

John refuses to delay the hearing, and he tells David to take it up with the D.A. At the hearing, John reluctantly rules that there is not enough evidence to put the attackers on trial. Meanwhile, Ellen passes away from her injuries, which devastates and further angers David.

That evening, John is kidnapped by an understandably enraged David, who blames John for not doing enough to try and punish Ellen's killers. David has a large, mentally handicapped man named Ira Martin (Tiny Ron Taylor) working with him.

David reveals that he's holding John's wife Lisa (Julianne Phillips) in an abandoned warehouse, and that he's prepared to kill her. John has no choice but to obey, since David has rigged the abandoned warehouse with various electronic gizmos and traps.

However, John can save Lisa if he goes out on a rough trek through various parts of an especially rough neighborhood to find the evidence that's in the hands of the Ice Men's rival gang.

It's a part of town that David hopes will teach John some lessons about what gangs are doing to the city, so John won't be so willing to set gang members free anymore.

Forbidden to call the police, and having no money or credit cards, John now has the task of running around the neighborhood on foot in the middle of the night, and returning with the evidence.

David tells John that it has to be done in seven hours or less, or Lisa will be killed. It also becomes a hunt for the four gang members.

== Cast ==
- Beau Bridges as John Eden
- Ron Leibman as David Reardon
- Julianne Phillips as Lisa Eden
- Tiny Ron Taylor as Ira Martin
- Al Freeman Jr. as Danny Larivan
- Reggie Johnson as Chino
- Sandra Lee Gimpel as Ellen Reardon
- Shawn Miller as Doowa
