= Catherine Bach =

American actress (born 1955)

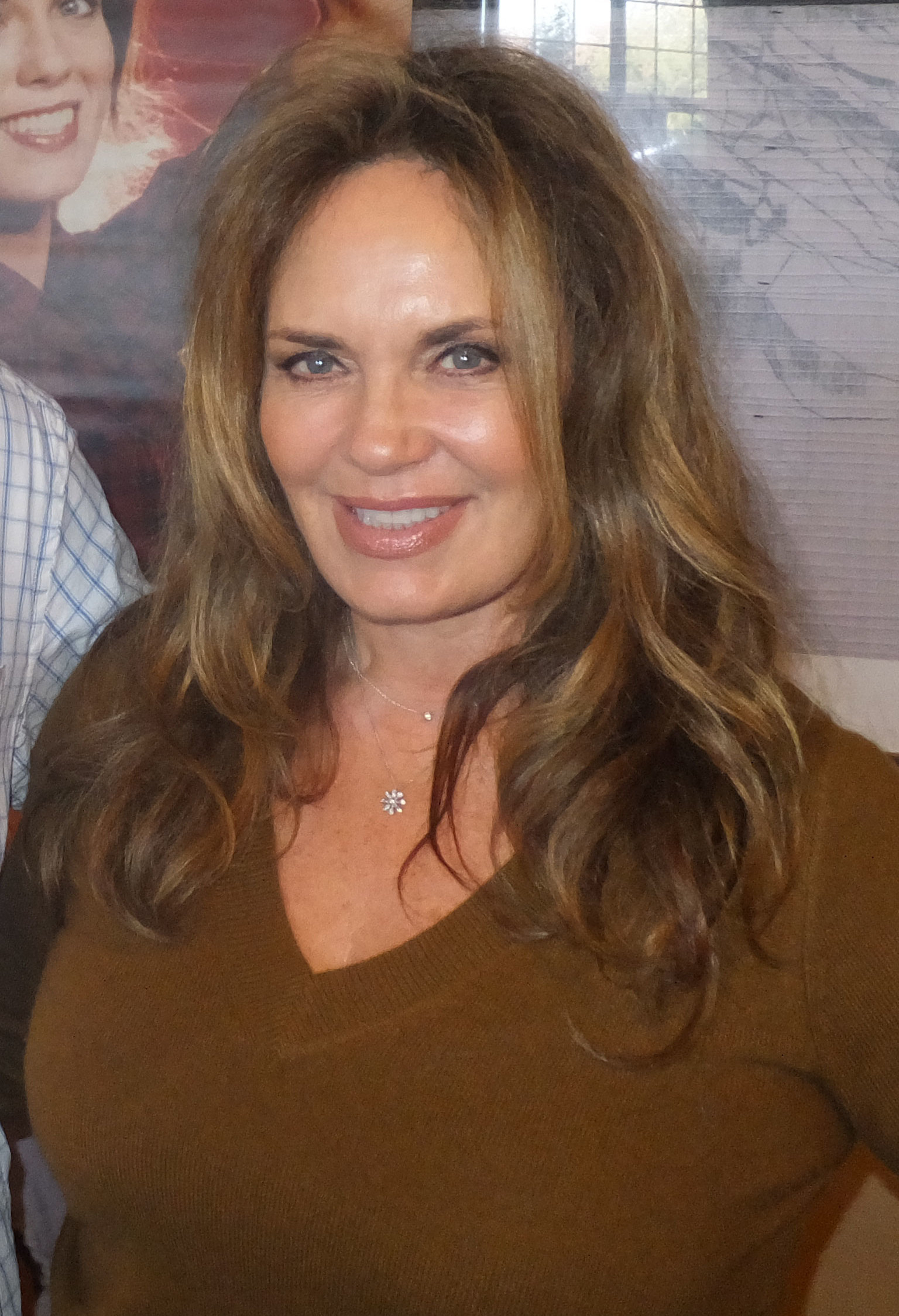
- Bach at the Chiller Theatre Expo in 2013
- Born: Catherine Bachman; March 1, 1955 (age 71); Warren, Ohio, U.S.
- Education: University of California, Los Angeles
- Occupation: Actress
- Years active: 1973–present
- Known for: Daisy Duke in The Dukes of Hazzard
- Spouses: David Shaw (m. 1976; div. 1981); Peter Lopez (m. 1990; died 2010)
- Children: 2

Catherine Bach (born Catherine Bachman; March 1, 1955) is an American actress. She is known for playing Daisy Duke in the television series The Dukes of Hazzard and Margo Dutton in African Skies. In 2012, she joined the cast of the CBS soap opera The Young and the Restless as Anita Lawson.

== Early life ==
Bach was born in Warren, Ohio, the daughter of Norma Jean Kucera (née Verdugo), an acupuncturist, and Bernard P. Bachman, a rancher. Her mother was a daughter of Antonio L. Verdugo, of Bisbee, Arizona, a baker born in Mexico, while her father was of German ancestry. She was raised in Warren, Ohio. Her mother, born into the Verdugo family, claimed to be descended from one of oldest Californio families.

She spent some of her childhood on a ranch in South Dakota, when she visited her grandparents in Faith, South Dakota. In 1970, Bach graduated from Stevens High School in Rapid City, South Dakota. She briefly majored in drama at UCLA, where she supplemented her income by making clothes for friends and theater groups.

== Career ==
Bach's professional debut was as one of the children in a production of The Sound of Music. Bach's first screen appearance was in the Burt Lancaster murder mystery, The Midnight Man, shot in upstate South Carolina in 1973, in which she played murder victim Natalie Claiburn. Her next role was Melody in the 1974 film Thunderbolt and Lightfoot.

Bach heard about the audition for The Dukes of Hazzard through her husband. When she arrived there, she found the producers were looking for a Dolly Parton-lookalike; despite not looking like what they were searching for, she was hired on the spot. One of the earliest costume ideas from the producers was that she wear a tight white turtleneck, go-go boots and a poodle skirt, but Bach asked if she could bring her own outfit, which was a homemade T-shirt, a pair of cut-off denim shorts and high heels. Bach had concerns about the appropriateness of the cut-off shorts at first, saying she could not wear them in a restaurant scene. When prompted by the producers to visit a restaurant across the street, Bach found the waitresses were wearing "little miniskirts that matched the tablecloths!" This style of cut-off denim shorts is now popularly known as "Daisy Dukes" in reference to Bach's character of that name from the show. She starred on The Dukes of Hazzard opposite Tom Wopat, John Schneider and James Best.

At the suggestion of the show's producers, Bach posed as Daisy Duke for a poster, which sold 5 million copies. The poster once caused a stir when Nancy Reagan took a liking to it after Bach visited the White House with one as a gift for one of her former schoolteachers then working there.

While she was starring on The Dukes of Hazzard, her legs were insured for $1,000,000. In 1985, she served as the model for the figurehead for the schooner Californian.

After the series ended, Bach had roles in a number of low-profile films. From 1992 to 1994, she starred in the Canadian family drama series, African Skies. In 2006, she guest-starred on Monk, and in 2010 had a small cameo in the comedy film You Again. In 2012, Bach joined the cast of CBS daytime soap opera, The Young and the Restless in the recurring role of Anita Lawson.

In 2002, Bach launched a line of diamond jewelry at Debenhams.

== Personal life ==
Bach married David Shaw (stepson of Angela Lansbury) in 1976; the couple divorced in 1981. Bach married entertainment lawyer Peter Lopez in August 1990. They had two daughters. On April 30, 2010, 60-year-old Lopez was found shot dead in an apparent suicide.

Bach is Catholic.

On October 30, 2025, Bach's Dukes of Hazzard co-star Ben Jones announced on social media that Bach was forced to cancel an appearance at Cooter's Place as she had been hospitalized in Los Angeles due to an embolism that developed as a result of a recent surgery. Bach's other Dukes of Hazzard co-stars Tom Wopat and John Schneider posted on social media offering their thoughts and prayers as she recovered. Bach was released from the hospital a few days later and was spotted out walking her dog on November 5, 2025.

== Filmography ==
=== Film ===
Year	Title	Role	Notes
1974	The Midnight Man	Natalie Clayborne	
1974	Thunderbolt and Lightfoot	Melody	
1975	Hustle	Peggy Summers	
1978	Crazed	Sue	
1983	Cannonball Run II	Marcie Thatcher	
1987	Street Justice	Tamarra	
1989	Criminal Act	Pam Weiss	
1989	Driving Force	Harry	
1990	Masters of Menace	Kitty Wheeler	
1992	The Nutt House	Benefit Reporter	
1992	Rage and Honor	Captain Murdock	
2004	Dragons: A Fantasy Made Real	Biologist	
2010	You Again	Daisy	
2013	Chapman	Mother	
2015	The Breakup Girl	Ellen	
2015	Book of Fire	Bibiana	

=== Television ===
Year	Title	Role	Notes
1975	Matt Helm	Alice	Episode: "Matt Helm"
1975	Strange New World	Lara	Television film
1977	Murder in Peyton Place	Linda	Television film
1977–1978	Police Woman		Episodes: "Screams" and "A Shadow on the Sea"
1979–1985	The Dukes of Hazzard	Daisy Duke	Series regular, 145 episodes
1980-1983	The Love Boat	Pamela Hodgekins / Pat Bigelow	Episodes: "No Girls for Doc/Marriage of Convenience/The Caller/The Witness" and "Going to the Dogs/Putting on the Dog/Women's Best Friend/Whose Dog Is It Anyway"
1980	Enos	Daisy Duke	Episode 1: "Enos"
1981	Enos	Daisy Duke	Episode 8: "One Daisy Per Summer"
1983	White Water Rebels	Trisha Parker	Television film
1983	The Dukes	Daisy Duke	Voice, 20 episodes
1992–1994	African Skies	Margo Dutton	Series regular, 52 episodes
1995	Space Ghost Coast to Coast	Herself	Episode: "Urges"
1997	The Dukes of Hazzard: Reunion!	Daisy Duke	Television film
2000	The Dukes of Hazzard: Hazzard in Hollywood	Daisy Duke	Television film
2006	Monk	Sara Jo	Episode: "Mr. Monk Meets His Dad"
2012-2019	The Young and the Restless	Anita Lawson	Recurring role
2014	Almost Royal	Herself	Episode: "Nashville"
2015	Hawaii Five-0	Amy Harlan	Episode: "Luapo'i"
2016	My Best Friend	Pearl	Television film
