= Deran Sarafian =

American film director

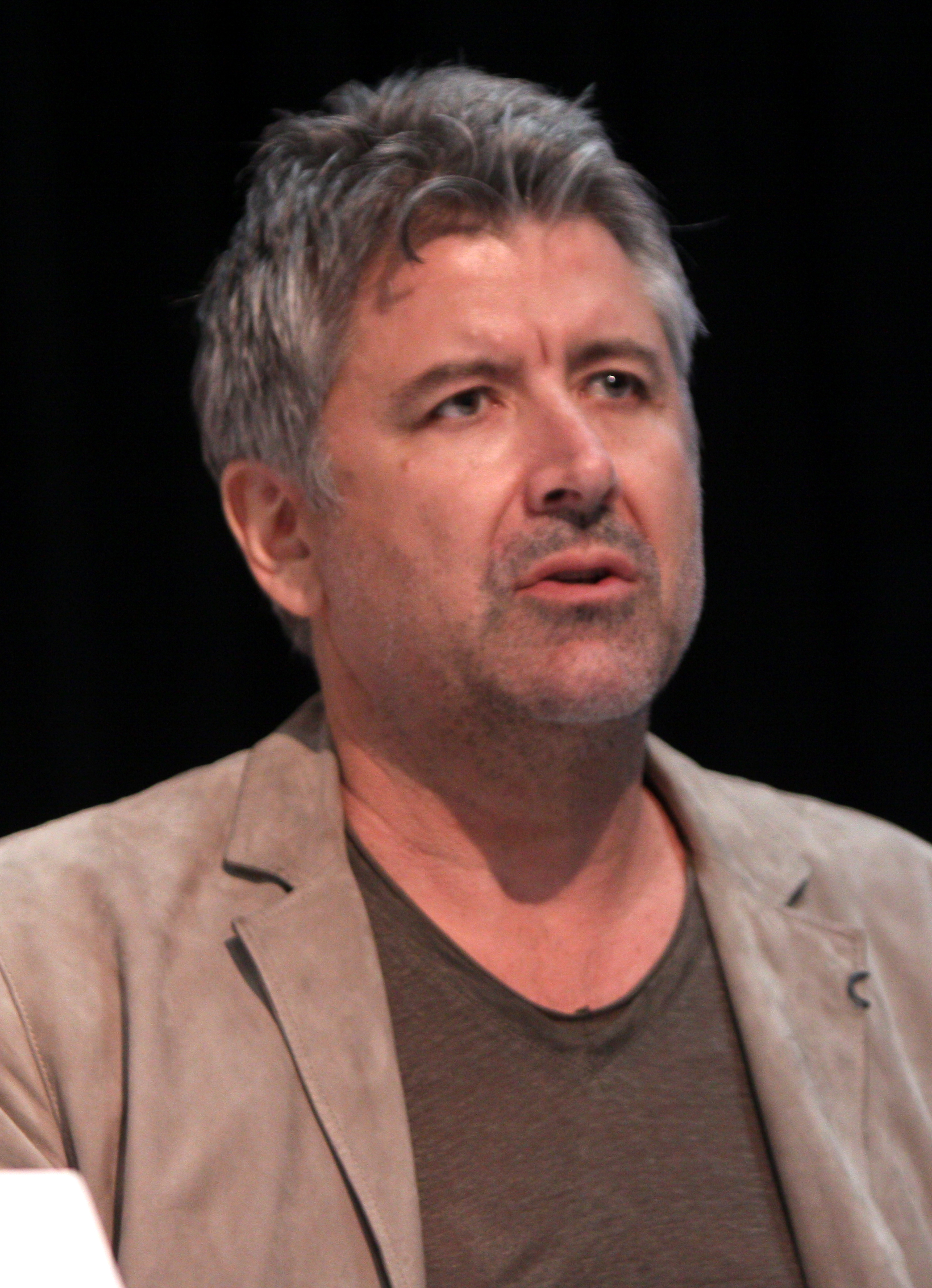
- Occupations: Director, actor
- Parent: Richard C. Sarafian

Deran Sarafian is an American film and television director and actor. He directed Death Warrant, Gunmen, and Terminal Velocity. He has been nominated for two Primetime Emmy Awards.

== Life and career ==
Sarafian is the son of film director Richard C. Sarafian, and the nephew of director, screenwriter and producer Robert Altman. He is the brother of Ani Sarafian, Tedi Sarafian, Richard Sarafian, Jr. and Damon B. Sarafian. He has two children with ex-wife, actress Laurie Fortier.

In 1983, Sarafian said he had spent the previous five years "ghost directing"; i.e., taking over films where the original director was unable to complete filming. These films included Young Warriors (1983).

After directing a number of genre movies in Spain and Italy, Sarafian entered into the mainstream by directing the Jean-Claude Van Damme action film Death Warrant. As a film director, he has worked primarily in the action and thriller genres.

Sarafian has directed twenty-three episodes of the FOX series House and was made a co-executive producer of the series from 2007 and 2009. He was the producing director for several episodes of the first season of CSI: NY. Sarafian has directed installments of: CSI: Crime Scene Investigation, CSI: Miami, Cold Case, The District, Without a Trace, Buffy the Vampire Slayer, Nash Bridges, Fringe, The Cape, Lost, Hell on Wheels, and Nikita.

== Select filmography ==
=== Directing ===
- The Falling (1986)
- Interzone (1987)
- To Die For (1989)
- Death Warrant (1990)
- Back in the USSR (1992)
- Gunmen (1994)
- The Road Killers (1994)
- Terminal Velocity (1994)
- Buffy the Vampire Slayer (1998) – Television | Season 2 Episode 18
- Road Rage (1999) – Television movie
- Trapped (2001) – Television
- House MD (2004) – Television
- Lost (2006) – Television
- Fringe (2010) – Television
- The Cape (2011) – Television
- Nikita (2012) – Television
- Hemlock Grove (2013) – Television
- The Strain (2014) – Television
- Dominion (2015) – Television
- Game of Silence (2015) – Television
- Rosewood (2016) – Television
- Wisdom of the Crowd (2017) – Television | Season 1 Episode 5
- Blue Bloods (2018) – Television
- The Gifted (2018) – Television | Season 2 Episode 17
- Swamp Thing (2019) – Television
- Project Blue Book (2020) – Television

=== Acting ===
- 10 to Midnight (1983) as Dale Anders
- Interzone (1987)
- Zombie 3 (1988)
- Gunmen (1994) as the Bishop
