= Karen Kondazian =

American actress

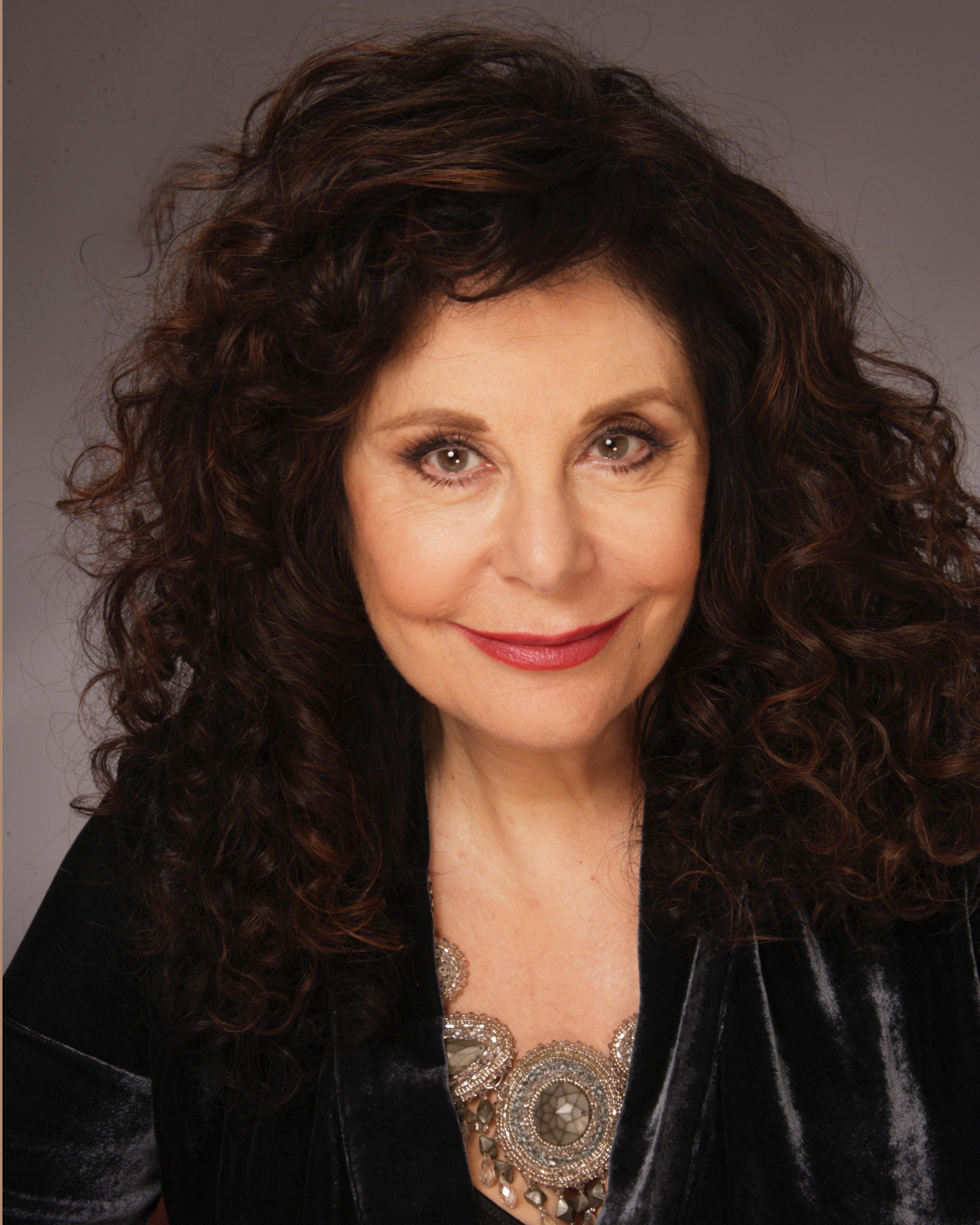
- Kondazian in 2012
- Born: January 27, 1941 (age 85); Newton, Massachusetts, U.S.
- Education: San Francisco State College (BA); University of Vienna; London Academy of Music and Dramatic Art
- Occupations: Actress; novelist
- Years active: 1972–2016
- Partner: Lex Barker (1972–1973; his death)

Karen Kondazian (born January 27, 1941) is an American actress and author. She is a recipient of the Los Angeles Drama Critics Circle Award's Best Actress award and is a four-time Drama-Logue Awards winner. She had a regular starring role in Shannon, as well guest-starring roles on Wiseguy, Frasier, NYPD Blue, and others.

== Life and career ==
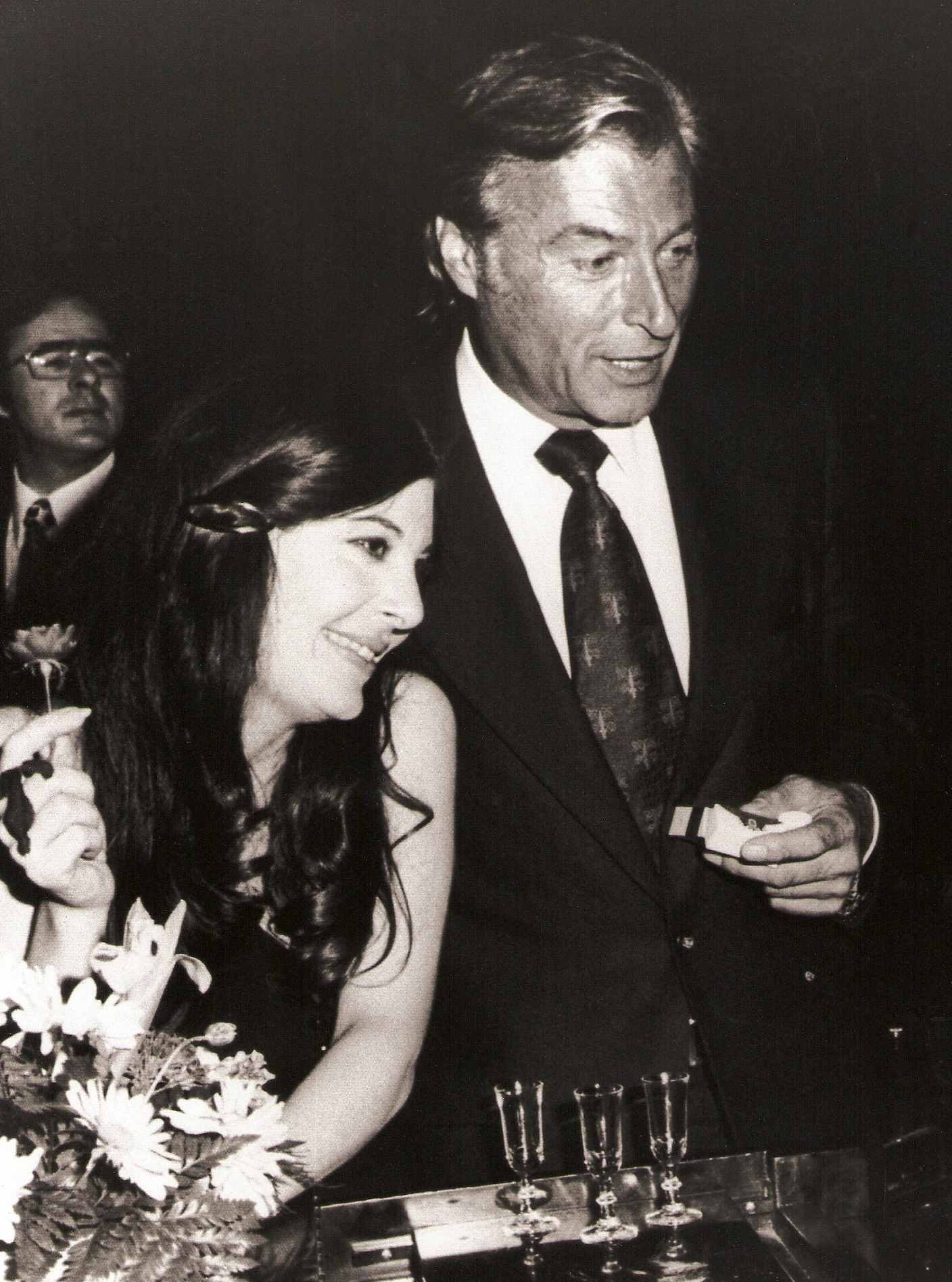
Kondazian with her fiancé Lex Barker, May 1973

Karen Kondazian was born in Newton, Massachusetts to an Armenian family. She attended Abraham Lincoln High School, received a B.A. from San Francisco State College, and graduated from the London Academy of Music and Dramatic Art. Kondazian began working in theater, starring in productions such as The Rose Tattoo and Master Class.

As a child, she appeared on Art Linkletter's Kids Say the Darndest Things.

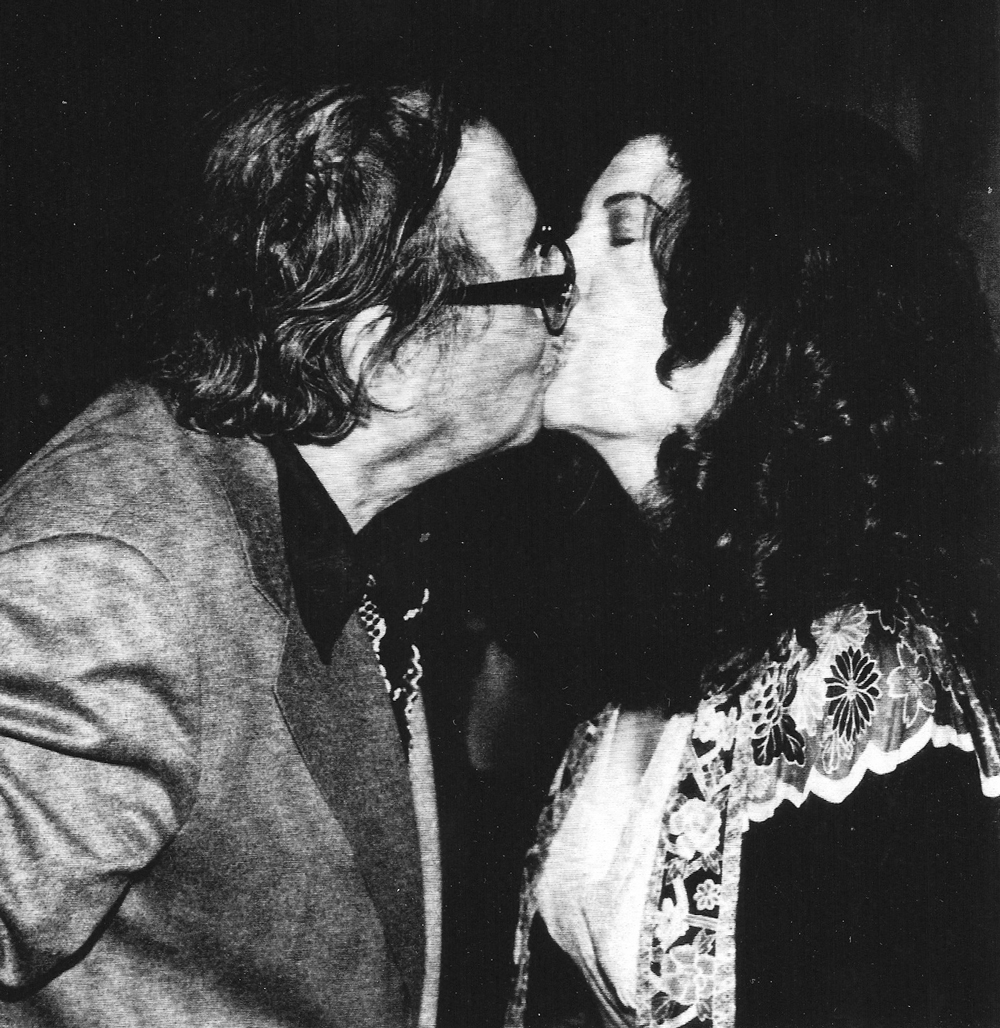
Kondazian and Tennessee Williams

She won the (1978) Los Angeles Drama Critics Circle Award's Best Actress award for her role in the Tennessee Williams play The Rose Tattoo (1978) and four Drama-Logue Awards for Sweet Bird of Youth (1980), Lady House Blues (1981), Vieux Carré (1983) and Tamara (1985). Kondazian met Williams at a Los Angeles Drama Critics Circle luncheon honoring him, and Williams reportedly allowed Kondazian to produce any of his plays. She was also nominated for an Ovation Best Actress Award in Master Class.

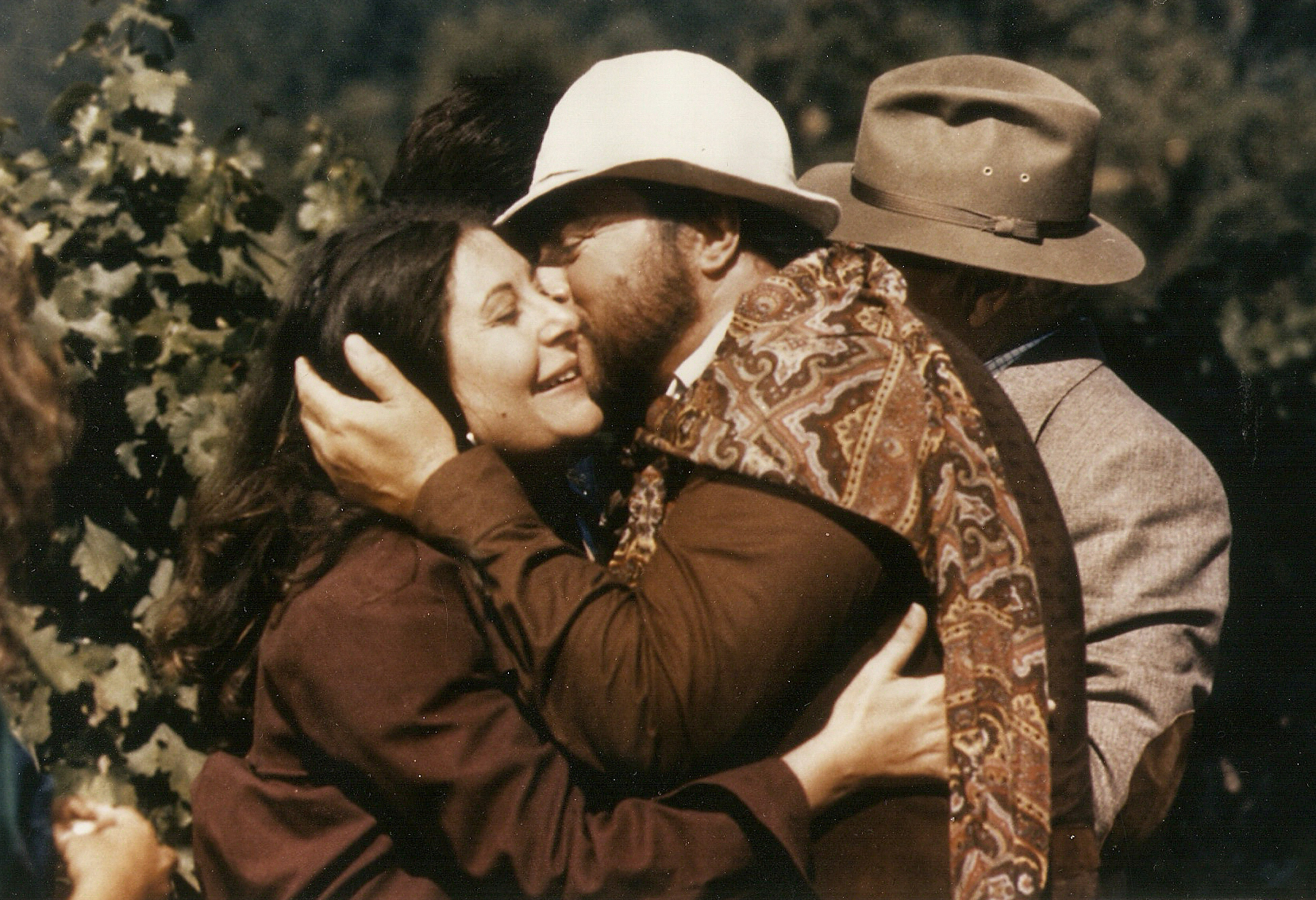
Luciano Pavarotti embraces Kondazian on the set of Yes, Giorgio

Her work on the stage led to numerous TV and film roles, including a recurring starring role the CBS series Shannon as Irene Lokatelli, and guest-starring roles in Wiseguy, Frasier, NYPD Blue, and the TV biopic James Dean. She also was in Yes, Giorgio and Cobra.

In 2000, Kondazian wrote the reference work The Actors' Encyclopedia of Casting Directors and The Whip in 2012, published by the Hansen Publishing Group, a historical novel about stagecoach driver Charley Parkhurst. The Whip was well-reviewed for its historical accuracy and story.

Kondazian is a member of the Actors Studio and the Academy of Television Arts and Sciences.

== Personal life ==
Kondazian was in a relationship with actor Lex Barker from 1972 until his death on May 11, 1973. They were engaged.

== Filmography ==
=== Film ===
Year	Title	Role	Notes
1977	Bare Knuckles	Pamela Devlin	
1981	Gangster Wars	Mrs. Luciano	
1981	Dream On!	Unknown	
1982	Yes, Giorgio	Francesca Giordano	
1982	Forty Days of Musa Dagh	Mme. Kebussyan	
1986	Cobra	Nurse Irene	
1995	Steal Big Steal Little	Mrs. Agopian	
1997	My Brother Jack	Rose Casale	
1998	Shadow of Doubt	TV Host / Panel (voice)	
1999	California Myth	Sonia	
2001	Wedding Album	Unknown	Short film
2001	Beyond the City Limits	Helena's Mother	
2007	The Blue Hour	Tello	
2009	The Shift	Sophia	Direct-to-DVD

=== Television ===
Year	Title	Role	Notes
1972	The Hound of the Baskervilles	Mrs. Mortimer	Television film
1972	Appointment with Destiny	Kate Elder Holliday	Episode: "Showdown at O.K. Corral"
1973	The Waltons	Franzia	Episode: "The Gypsies"
1980	A Rumor of War	Mrs. Modesta	Television miniseries
1981	Time Warp	Mrs. Cesere	Television film
1981–1982	Shannon	Irene Lokatelli	9 episodes
1982	Hill Street Blues	Widow Alessi	Episode: "The Shooter"
1986	Cagney & Lacey	Arroyo	Episode: "Capitalism"
1987	Moonlighting	Margaret Renborn	Episode: "Poltergeist III - Dipesto Nothing"
1987	Walt Disney's Wonderful World of Color	Madeleinska	Episode: "Bride of Boogedy"
1987	CBS Summer Playhouse	Lila	Episode: "Reno and Yolanda"
1988	Wiseguy	Unknown	Episode: "Aria for Don Aiuppo"
1990	Ferris Bueller	Marjorie Ganesha	Episode: "Ferris Bueller Can't Win"
1991	Locked Up: A Mother's Rage	Unknown	Television film
1991	Murder, She Wrote	Rosalee Rossari	Episode: "Lines of Excellence"
1992	Baywatch	Bella	Episode: "Summer of '85"
1992	Mortal Sins	Rose Croce	Television film
1995	Land's End	Mrs. Commandante	Episode: "El Perico"
1995	Ellen	Gypsy Fortune Teller	Episode: "Ellen's Choice"
1997	Tracey Takes On...	Casaba Woman	Episode: "Sex"
2000	Animated Stories from the New Testament	Old Woman	Episode: "Lazarus Lives"
2000	Frasier	Adrianna Pettibone	Episode: "And the Dish Ran Away with the Spoon: Part 2"
2001	James Dean	Mrs. Pierangeli	Television film
2002	NYPD Blue	Mrs. Kilik	Episode: "Oh, Mama!"
2005	McBride: The Doctor Is Out... Really Out	Nurse Williams	Television film
2009	The Bill Engvall Show	Fatima	Episode: "The Way We Were"

=== Video games ===
Year	Title	Role	Notes
1996	Zork Nemesis	Maria, Female Patient #2	

== Theatre ==
Year	Title	Role	Venue	Notes
1972	Richard II	Queen's Lady in Waiting	Ahmanson Theatre	
1974	Hamlet	Gertrude's Lady in Waiting	Mark Taper Forum Theater	
1978–1979	The Rose Tattoo	Serafina	Beverly Hills Playhouse	Los Angeles Drama Critics Circle Award – Best Actress
1980	Sweet Bird of Youth	Princess Kosmonopolis	Gene Dynarski Theater	Drama-Logue Award
1981	Lady House Blues	Liz Madden	South Coast Repertory Theater	Drama-Logue Award
1983	Vieux Carré	Mrs. Wire	Beverly Hills Playhouse	LA Weekly Theater Award – Best Actress; Drama-Logue Award
1984	Broken Eggs	Sonia	Ensemble Studio Theatre	
1985–1986	Tamara	Aelis	Il Vittoriale	Drama-Logue Award
1987	The Night of the Iguana	Maxine	Old Globe Theatre	
1989	Freedomland	Claude	South Coast Repertory Theater	Play; Nominated—Pulitzer Prize
1989	Mixed Blessings	Velia Martinez	Coconut Grove Playhouse	
1991	Who's Afraid of Virginia Woolf?	Martha	Berkeley Repertory Theatre	Nominated—San Francisco Drama Critics Circle Award – Best Actress
1996	Orpheus Descending	Lady	The Fountain Theatre	Nominated—Ovation Award – Best Actress
2000	The Night of the Iguana	Maxine	The Fountain Theatre	Back Stage Garland Award
2003–2004	Master Class	Maria Callas	The Fountain Theatre	Ovation Award – Best Production of the Year; Back Stage Garland Award; Maddy Award; Entertainment Today Award – Best Actress
2005	Kissing Fidel	Miriam	42nd Street Theater	
2007	The Milk Train Doesn't Stop Here Anymore	Mrs. Goford	The Fountain Theatre	Nominated—LA Weekly Theater Award – Best Actress
2016	Baby Doll	Aunt Rose Comfort	The Fountain Theatre	

== Bibliography ==
- The Actors Encyclopedia of Casting Directors (2000)
- The Whip (2012)

== Awards ==
=== Acting ===
- Los Angeles Drama Critics Circle Award for Best Actress, The Rose Tattoo (1979)
- Drama-Logue Award for Sweet Bird of Youth (1980)
- Drama-Logue Award for Lady House Blues (1981)
- LA Weekly Theater Award for Best Actress, Vieux Carré (1983)
- Drama-Logue Award for Vieux Carré (1983)
- Drama-Logue Award for Tamara (1985)
- Back Stage Garland Award for The Night of the Iguana (2000)
- Ovation Award for Master Class, Best Production of the Year (2004)
- Back Stage Garland Award for Master Class (2004)
- Maddy Award for Master Class (2004)
- Entertainment Today Award for Best Actress, Master Class (2004)

=== Writing ===
- 2014 Readers Favorite, Gold Medal Prize for Winner Best Western Fiction, The Whip
- 2013 Global Ebook Awards, First Place - Winner Best Historical Fiction, The Whip
- USA Book News Award, Best Historical Fiction, The Whip (2012)
- National Indie Excellence Award, Best Western, The Whip (2013)
- International Book Award, Best Western, The Whip (2013)
