= Roadflower =

- German theatrical release poster
- Directed by: Deran Sarafian
- Written by: Tedi Sarafian
- Produced by: John Flock; Lance Hool
- Starring: Christopher Lambert; Craig Sheffer; David Arquette; Josh Brolin; Joseph Gordon-Levitt; John Pyper-Ferguson; Christopher McDonald; Michelle Forbes
- Cinematography: James L. Carter
- Edited by: Peck Prior
- Music by: Les Hooper
- Production companies: Dimension Films; John Flock Productions; Roadflower; Silver Lion Films
- Distributed by: Miramax Films; Dimension Films
- Release date: February 10, 1995
- Running time: 89 minutes
- Country: United States
- Language: English

Roadflower (also known as Road Flower or The Road Killers) is a 1995 American road thriller film directed by Deran Sarafian from a screenplay by his brother Tedi. It stars Christopher Lambert, Craig Sheffer, Michelle Forbes, Joseph Gordon-Levitt, David Arquette, Josh Brolin, Christopher McDonald, John Pyper-Ferguson and Adrienne Shelly.

== Plot ==
Jack Lerolland, his wife Helen and daughter Ashley are on a cross country trip with his brother Glen and Glen's son Rich when they run into car trouble. After Rich is nearly run down, a confrontation at a diner leads to Glen racing after the car that was involved. The driver, a psychopath named Cliff, forces Glen into a game of chicken, which results in Glen crashing his car off the side of the road; Jack and the others are unable to pull Glen from the burning car before it explodes. Cliff and his gang confront Jack on the road, knocking him unconscious and kidnapping the others. Cliff tells one of his gang, Tom, to kill Jack, but Tom is unable, shooting the ground next to Jack, who plays possum. The gang meets up at a dilapidated house, where they hold the family hostage.

Meanwhile, Jack has made his way to a police station, but is thrown into a cell while the on-duty officer goes to check out the gang's hideout. The police officer arrives later at the hideout but is shot dead by a surprised Cliff. Cliff becomes suspicious of Tom, angered by his inability to kill Jack, and kills him in cold blood. At the station, Jack and Hauser, Cliff's older brother, break out of the prison. Jack is tricked by Hauser into waiting at the station, while Hauser takes the police car to join his brother at the hideout. Jack subsequently takes another car and races to the hideout to free his family.

After the deaths of two more of his gang, Cliff escapes the hideout with Hauser and Ashley. Cliff says he can't remember killing their mother, and Hauser confesses to being the murderer; Cliff kills Hauser for having Cliff take the blame for years. They continue to evade police capture, until they reach a major railway crossing. Jack, who has been following Cliff, chases him onto the other side of the crossing and a fight ensues, with Jack gaining the upper hand and handcuffing Cliff to his car. Jack then moves the car onto one of the tracks and leaves it to be smashed by an approaching train, killing Cliff.

== Cast ==
- Christopher Lambert as Jack Lerolland
- Craig Sheffer as Cliff
- David Arquette as Bobby
- Josh Brolin as Tom
- John Pyper-Ferguson as Hauser
- Joseph Gordon-Levitt as Rich Lerolland
- Michael Greene as Sheriff Hodes
- Christopher McDonald as Glen Lerolland
- Michelle Forbes as Helen Lerolland
- Alexondra Lee as Ashley Lerolland
- Adrienne Shelly as Red
- George Salazar as Milo
- Paulo Tocha as Officer Garcia
- Ernest Smith as Officer Cortez
- Jack Rader as Deputy Wilcox
- Joe La Due as Majestic
- Pamela Gordon as Clerk
- Patrick Thompson as Local
- Richard C. Sarafian as Shaller
- Richard Sarafian as Trucker

== See also ==
- Hot Rods To Hell
