= Street Justice (film) =

- Directed by: Richard C. Sarafian
- Written by: James J. Docherty
- Produced by: Michael Masciarelli; David Witz
- Starring: Michael Ontkean; Joanna Kerns; Catherine Bach
- Cinematography: Roland "Ozzie" Smith
- Edited by: Mark Lee Goldberg
- Music by: Paul Hertzog; Jamii Szmadzinski
- Production companies: Street Justice Productions; Warner Bros.
- Distributed by: Warner Bros.
- Release date: June 1, 1987
- Running time: 93 minutes
- Country: United States
- Language: English

Street Justice is a 1987 American action film directed by Richard C. Sarafian.

The plot involves CIA agent Curt Flynn (Michael Ontkean) who narrowly avoids death in a bombing, escapes from imprisonment by the Soviets, and returns to his New Jersey hometown. There he attempts to protect his wife Catherine (Joanna Kerns) from a corrupt family which controls the town.

Despite being set in New Jersey, the bulk of filming took place in Toronto.

Street Justice was Dukes of Hazzard star Catherine Bach's debut as a lead in a feature film.

== Cast ==
- Michael Ontkean as Curt Flynn
- Joanna Kerns as Catherine Watson
- Catherine Bach as Tamarra
- J. D. Cannon as Dante
- Jeanette Nolan as Mrs. Chandler
- Richard Cox as Sam Chandler
- Sandee Currie as Mandy
- David B. Nichols as Ed Watson
- William Windom as Father Burke
- Alan Scarfe as Eugene Powers

== Reception ==
From contemporary reviews, "Lor." of Variety called the film "a minor action drama", writing that a "good cast is mired in routine scripting." TV Guide criticized the film's script as "clumsy" and "loaded with lackluster dialog and stock characters." Leonard Maltin called it "slow, unconvincing, and instantly forgettable."
