= Liberty (1986 film) =

- Genre: Historical drama
- Screenplay by: Pete Hamill (billed as Robert Malloy)
- Directed by: Richard C. Sarafian
- Starring: Chris Sarandon; Frank Langella; Carrie Fisher; Dana Delany
- Composer: William Goldstein
- Country of origin: United States
- Original language: English

Production
- Executive producers: Jean Chalopin; Robert Greenwald
- Producer: Paul Pompian
- Production locations: Baltimore, Maryland; Chateau de Ferrières 77164, Ferrières-en-Brie, France; Maison Opéra Paris, France; Senlis 60300 Oise, France
- Cinematography: Al Francis
- Editor: Robert Florio
- Running time: 180 minutes

Original release
- Network: NBC
- Release: June 23, 1986

Liberty is a television film which aired on NBC on June 23, 1986. It is a largely fictionalized account of the construction of the Statue of Liberty (Liberty Enlightening the World), which had been completed 100 years earlier.

Scenes were shot on location in Paris and Baltimore.

== Plot ==
Sculptor Frédéric Auguste Bartholdi (Frank Langella) and author Édouard de Laboulaye (Jean-Pierre Cassel) agree to create a monument to present to the United States on behalf of the French people. Bartholdi searches for a model, approaching (and romancing) young woman Jeanne Baheau (Corinne Touzet) for the body of the statue, and deciding to use his mother (Claire Bloom) as a model for its face.

Enlisted to help with its construction are immigrant coppersmith Jacque Marchant (Chris Sarandon), shop owner Seamus Reilly (George Kennedy), and assistant Robert Johnson (LeVar Burton). Marchant falls in love with poet Emma Lazarus (Carrie Fisher), who supplies the sonnet "The New Colossus" for the base of the statue.

== Cast ==
Actor	Role
Chris Sarandon	Jacque Marchant
Frank Langella	Frédéric Auguste Bartholdi
Carrie Fisher	Emma Lazarus
Dana Delany	Moya Trevor
Corinne Touzet	Jeanne Baheau
George Kennedy	Seamus Reilly
Claire Bloom	Madame Bartholdi
LeVar Burton	Robert Johnson
Jean-Pierre Cassel	Édouard de Laboulaye
Remak Ramsay	John La Farge
Philip Bosco	Boss William Tweed
Alan North	Ulysses S. Grant
Max Wright	Alexandre Gustave Eiffel
Jean De Baer	Allyse
Dennis Boutsikaris	Joseph Pulitzer
Walter Gotell	Rabbi Goteyel
Angela Bassett	Linda Thornton

== Reception ==
Reviews of Liberty were generally negative. Jeff Jarvis of People and Clifford Terry of the Chicago Tribune criticized the film for its screenplay and the mixing of fictional characters with historical figures.

Screenwriter Pete Hamill was unhappy with the finished product, and had his name changed to "Robert Malloy" in the credits.
