= Tidal Wave: No Escape =

- Genre: Disaster
- Written by: Tedi Sarafian; George Malko
- Directed by: George T. Miller
- Starring: Corbin Bernsen; Julianne Phillips; Gregg Henry; Larry Brandenburg; Lawrence Hilton-Jacobs
- Music by: Bruce Rowland
- Country of origin: United States
- Original language: English

Production
- Executive producers: Robert Halmi; Tedi Sarafian
- Producer: J. Boyce Harman Jr.
- Cinematography: Mark Irwin
- Editor: Corky Ehlers
- Running time: 91 minutes
- Production company: Hallmark Entertainment

Original release
- Network: ABC
- Release: May 5, 1997

Tidal Wave: No Escape is a 1997 American made-for-television disaster film directed by George T. Miller starring Corbin Bernsen, Julianne Phillips, Gregg Henry. It originally aired on ABC on Monday May 5, 1997.

== Plot ==
A series of tidal waves bring chaos to the coast of California, prompting a navy scientist and an oceanographer to find the cause. They are not prepared for what they find and try to stop the person behind the man-made tidal waves.

== Cast ==
- Corbin Bernsen as John Wahl
- Julianne Phillips as Jessica Weaver
- Gregg Henry as Edgar Purcell
- Larry Brandenburg as Frank Brisick
- Lawrence Hilton-Jacobs as Marlan Clark

== See also ==
Killer Wave, a 2007 miniseries with a similar plot and identically-named villain.
