= Larry Brandenburg =

American actor

- Born: May 3, 1948 (age 78); Wabasha, Minnesota
- Years active: 1984–present

Larry Brandenburg (born May 3, 1948) is an American actor. He has appeared in numerous television shows and films including The Shawshank Redemption, Fargo, The Santa Clause and The Untouchables.

== Filmography ==
Year	Title	Role	Notes
1984	Grandview, U.S.A.	Mickey	
1987	Murder Ordained	Judge	TV movie
1987	The Untouchables	Reporter #2	Feature film role
1989	Field of Dreams	PTA Heckler	
1989	Music Box	John Staley	
1989	Cold Justice	Ray	
1990	Goodnight Sweet Wife: A Murder in Boston	Captain Brady	TV movie
1991	Dillinger	Pfouhl	TV movie
1991	Hard Promises	Garber	
1991	Victimless Crimes		
1992	Quantum Leap	Commander Hugh Dobbs	episode "A Leap for Lisa"
1992	Mo' Money	Businessman	
1992	Shame	Sheriff Wallace Cuddy	TV movie
1992	Desperate Choices: To Save My Child	Ed Foster	TV movie
1992	Cheers	Cop	2 episodes
1993	Bakersfield P.D.	Gonzo	in episode "Bakersfield Madam"
1994	Wings	Investigator	in episode "The Faygitive"
1994	The Shawshank Redemption	Skeet	
1994	SeaQuest 2032	DeNado	in episode "Daggers"
1994	The Santa Clause	Detective Nunzio	
1995	The George Wendt Show	Sheriff	in episode "A River Runs Through His Head"
1995	The Client	Sergeant Fleming	in episode "Dear Harris"
1995	Almost Perfect	Judge Andrew Vaupen	in episode "Presumed Impotent"
1996	Fargo	Stan Grossman	
1996	Land's End	Bruce	in episode "Who's Killing Cole Porter?"
1997	Tidal Wave: No Escape	Frank Brisick	TV movie
1997	ER	Mr. Lensky	in episode "Make a Wish"
1997	Total Security	Art McLaren	in episode "The Never Bending Story"
1997	Profiler	Judge A. Santa Croce	in episode "Power Corrupts"
1998	Brooklyn South	Lieutenant Peter Fiorello	in episode Doggonit
1998	Major League: Back to the Minors	Chuck Swartski	
1998	Sour Grapes	Landlord	
1998	Fear and Loathing in Las Vegas	Cop in Back	
1998	The Drew Carey Show	Father McNabb	3 episodes
1998	Michael Hayes	Businessman	in episode "Vaughn Mower"
1998	Maximum Bob	Pastor Buddy	in episode "Good Dog Karl"
1998	Rugrats	Friendly Guy / Massuer	in episode "Man of the House / A Whole New Stu", Voice
1998	Mighty Joe Young	Animal Control Duty Officer	
1997-1999	Ally McBeal	Judge Raynsford Hopkins	3 episodes
1999	The Mod Squad	Eckford	
1999	JAG	Glen Dobie	in episode "The Adversaries"
2001	Imp, Inc.	Guy Westher	TV short, Voice
2001	Touched by an Angel	Slave-Catcher	in episode "The Sign of the Dove"
1997-2001	The Practice	Judge Steven Winwood	in episodes "Inter Arma Silent Lege" and "Part I"
2002	Charmed	Mr. Martin	in episode "A Paige from the Past"
2002	The West Wing	Senator Michael Jackson	in episode "The Red Mass"
2003	The Guardian	Bill Klapperman	in episode "My Aim Is True"
2003	Boston Public	Judge Marcus Weisman	in episode "Chapter Sixty-Two"
2003	Baby Bob	Ken Holden	in episode "Rush Limbob"
2003	Skin		in episode, "Pilot"
2004	Cold Case	Mike Richardson	in episode Hubris
2004	What the Bleep Do We Know!?	Bruno	Documentary
2004	Monk	Val Birch	in episode "Mr. Monk and the Game Show"
2005	Blind Justice	Glen Semple	in episode "Up on the Roof""
2006	?What the Bleep!?: Down the Rabbit Hole	Bruno	Documentary
2007	John from Cincinnati	Ernie, Bartender at the VFW	2 episodes
2008	Grey's Anatomy	Arnie Grandy	in episode "Brave New World"
2009	Raising the Bar		in episode "Fine and Dandy"
2010	Last Harbor	Sam Black	
2010	NCIS	Hubble	in episode "Jurisdiction"
2010	Star Wars: The Clone Wars	Bric	in episode "Clone Cadets", Voice
