= Jorts =

Shorts made of denim

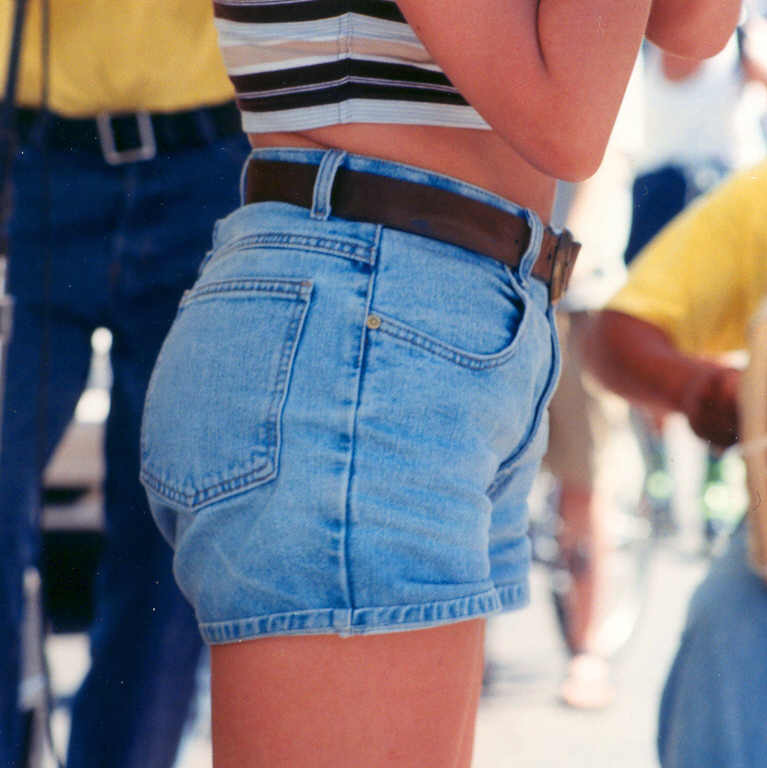
Women's upper-thigh–length hemmed jorts

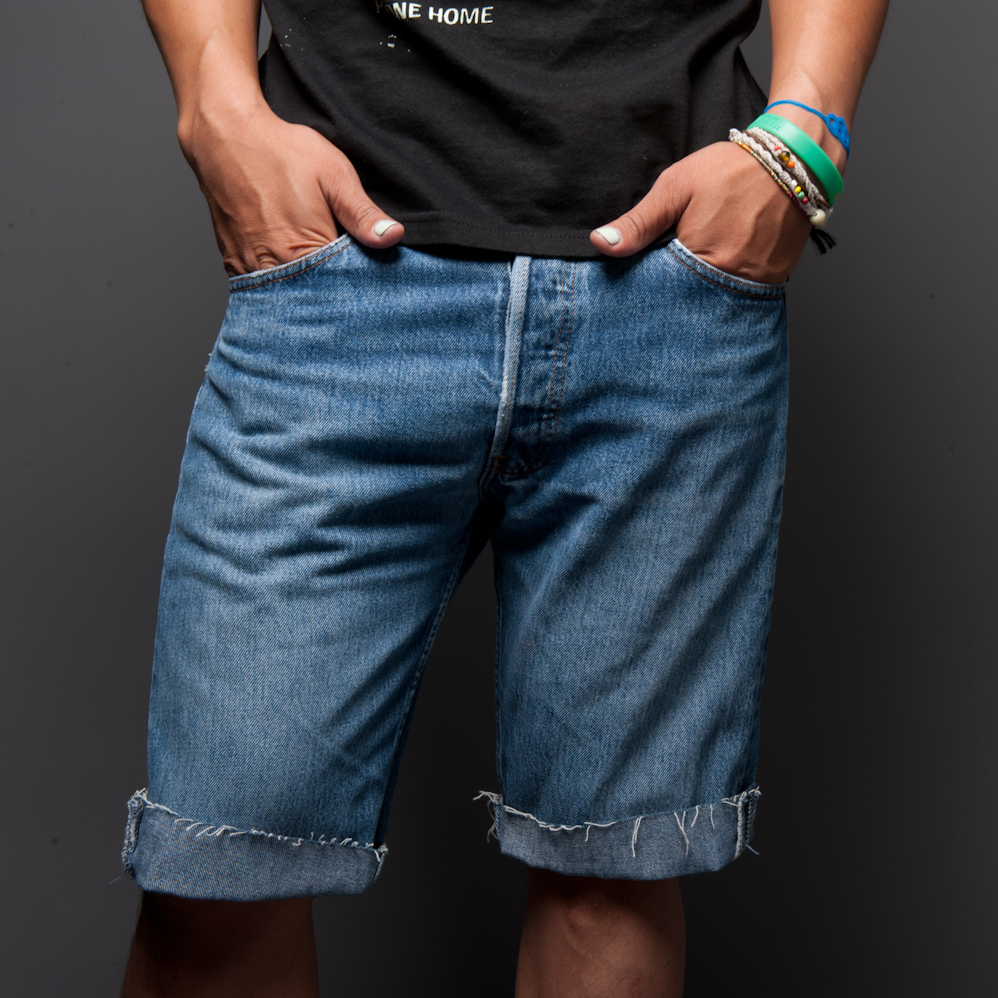
Men's knee-length cut-off jorts

Jean shorts or jorts are shorts made out of denim. They may be cutoffs, which are made by cutting jeans, or store-bought jorts. The word "jorts" sometimes refers specifically to oversized denim shorts popularly worn by men. The word is often used humorously, and the style has been associated with uncool or "dad" fashion.

Jean shorts were invented during the counterculture of the 1960s. In following decades, they were associated with countercultures such as punk, hip hop, and skateboarding. Very short cutoffs, known as Daisy Dukes (after a character from the series The Dukes of Hazzard), were popular in the 1970s. Baggy jorts were introduced in the 1980s. In the 1990s and 2000s, various styles of jorts were popular, and baggy shorts were often worn by hip hop musicians. Long jorts became a trend in the early 2020s, before which Daisy Dukes had been more fashionable. Celebrities and luxury brands became associated with jorts, which people wore for both comfort and ironic value.

== Etymology ==
The word "jorts", a portmanteau of "jean shorts", was first attested in the 1990s. It was added to the Oxford English Dictionary in 2013 and to Merriam-Webster in 2023. The word may refer to denim shorts in general or to an oversized style popular in the 2020s. The use of the word "cutoffs", referring to jeans or other pants that have been cut, is attested by 1967.

The word "jorts" is often used to humorously or derisively refer to unfashionable denim shorts worn by men, while the words "cutoffs" and "Daisy Dukes" refer to more popular women's styles. According to The Washington Post's André Wheeler, the funny sound of the word contributes to the humorous reputation of jorts.

== History ==
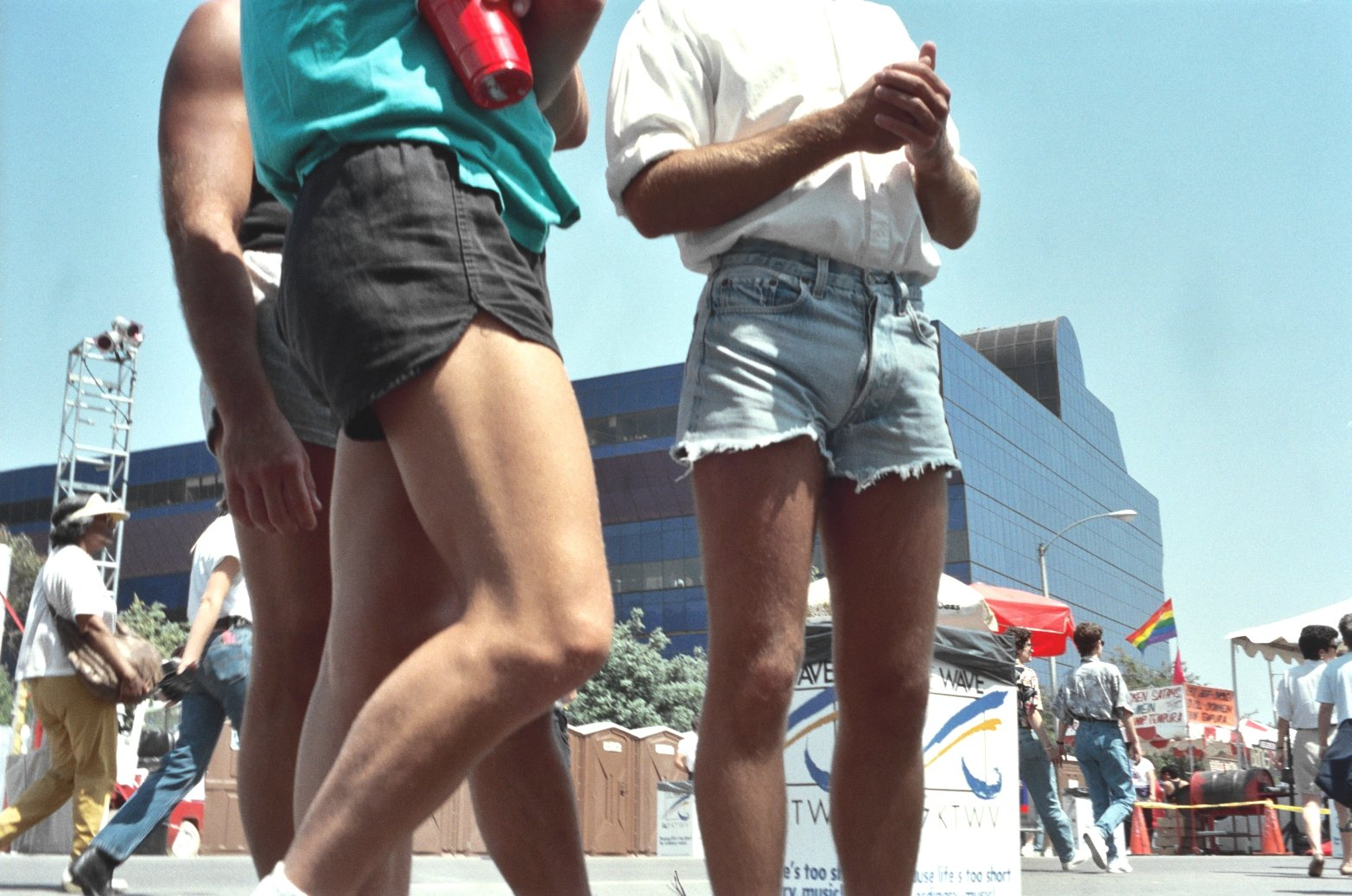
Men wearing jorts in 1991

Jeans were popularized in the 19th century, but shorts were seen as immodest. During the counterculture of the 1960s, when shorts became popular, people began cutting jeans to shorten them. Jean shorts continued to be associated with counterculture in the 1970s, when they were worn by punk artists such as Debbie Harry and Patti Smith. In following decades, jean shorts were popular among countercultures such as hip hop, skaters, and rave culture.

The character Daisy Duke, played by Catherine Bach in The Dukes of Hazzard, wore very short cutoffs. The style became known in the 1970s as Daisy Dukes, a term used into the 2020s. Very short denim shorts were the dominant style for both men and women of the 1970s. In the 1980s, long jorts with high waists and light washes were popular. Tennis player Andre Agassi wore short, acid-washed Nike jean shorts at the 1988 US Open, an atypical choice of fabric for the sport. Oversized, baggy jorts entered the market in the 1980s, becoming associated with skateboarding and surf culture.

Various jorts styles were popular in the 1990s. New York hip hop artists of the 1990s, such as Ol' Dirty Bastard and Killah Priest, popularized baggy jorts. Short jorts were popular in the 1990s among designers such as Azzedine Alaïa. They were worn by 1990s celebrities such as Cindy Crawford, Mariah Carey, Halle Berry, and Britney Spears. The older style of cut-off jeans was associated with punk and grunge musicians like Courtney Love.

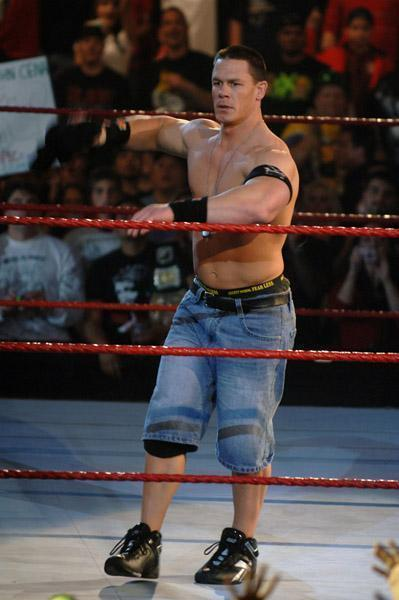
John Cena wrestling in jorts

Jorts of varying lengths became trends in the 2000s. Rappers such as Nelly and Lil Jon wore loose, ankle-length jorts, and Chingy wore extremely long orange jorts to the BET Awards 2005. Wrestler John Cena became known for baggy jorts, which he wore as part of his early hip hop persona and continued to wear through his career. The 2010s saw fashions including colorful and studded jorts. A 2016 article in The Washington Post found that, based on Google Trends data, jorts were more popular in the Midwestern United States than cargo shorts, which were popular in the Southeast and Northwest.

By the early 2020s, Daisy Dukes were the most popular style of denim shorts, but long jorts began to gain popularity. Long jorts were seen as frumpy and associated with the outfits of "dads", but became popular among young men who wore them ironically in the summer of 2021. Models such as Kendall Jenner and Gigi and Bella Hadid brought long jorts into fashion. Long jorts became a major trend in 2023, and were labelled by Vogue as a summer trend of 2024. The style of Bermuda-length, wide-legged, narrow-waisted jorts gained popularity on social media. Celebrities such as Charli XCX, Justin and Hailey Bieber, and Dua Lipa wore them. Brands such as Givenchy, Marine Serre, Valentino, Diesel, and Louis Vuitton released luxury versions. The trend was widely associated with the slacker subculture, while some wearers associated them with Y2K fashion or androgynous fashion. The Washington Post's André Wheeler associated it with Charli XCX's "Brat summer" trend. The trend was polarizing; some internet users viewed long jorts as their comfortable and versatile summer clothing, while others negatively associated the length with "dad" fashion.

== Styles and popularity ==
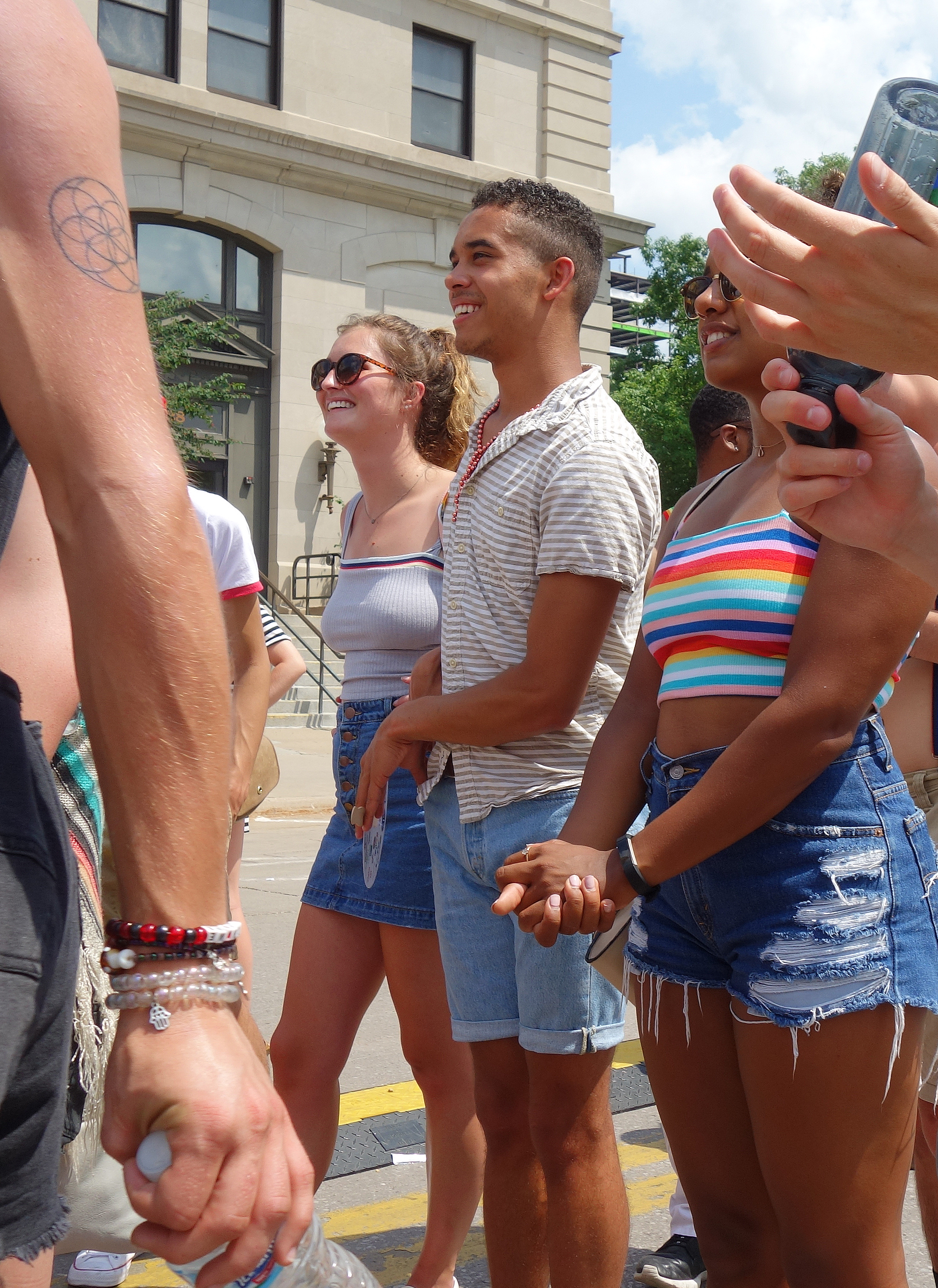
People at a pride event wearing various styles of jorts

Jorts can be DIY and made by cutting existing jeans, and store-bought jorts may be hemmed or may be frayed to resemble handmade jorts. Many jorts are sold through secondhand vendors. Jorts are available in various colors and inseam lengths, and they may have visible pockets. Technical jorts, such as those made by Ripton & Co, are designed for outdoor protection.

Jorts are often disparaged due to being unusually short or being too long to fit the wearer's body shape, and for being an outdated style from the 1990s or 2000s. Popular culture often humorously references men's jorts, such as a Bud Light commercial in the Real Men of Genius series; a sketch on The Tonight Show in which Jimmy Fallon, Will Ferrell, and Nick Jonas sing about jorts; and the phrase "Gators wear jean shorts", coined in 1997 to insult the Florida Gators and their fans.

== See also ==
- Canadian tuxedo
- Denim skirt
