= Richard C. Sarafian =

American film director and actor (1930–2013)

- Born: Richard Caspar Sarafian; April 28, 1930; New York City, New York, U.S.
- Died: September 18, 2013 (aged 83); Santa Monica, California, U.S.
- Education: New York University
- Occupations: Film director, writer, actor
- Years active: 1952–2007
- Spouse: Helen Joan Altman
- Children: 5, including Deran and Tedi

Richard Caspar Sarafian (April 28, 1930 – September 18, 2013) was an Armenian-American film director and actor. He compiled a versatile career that spanned over five decades as a director, actor, and writer. Sarafian is best known as the director of the 1971 film Vanishing Point and the classic The Twilight Zone episode "Living Doll".

== Biography ==
Sarafian was born in New York City on April 28, 1930, to Armenian immigrants. He studied pre-law and pre-med at New York University and was a poor student, but changed over to studying film, at which he excelled. He left college to join the United States Army, in which he served as a reporter for an Army news service. While stationed in Kansas City, Missouri during the Korean War (1950–1953) he met the future Hollywood director Robert Altman, and the two became friends.

Sarafian worked with Altman on industrial films and married Altman's sister, Helen Joan Altman. He also acted in a local play Altman directed. His television career began in the early 1960s in Kansas City as Altman's assistant. Sarafian soon began to direct television shows, and in 1963, he scored one of his great successes as director of the "Living Doll" episode of The Twilight Zone. His first feature film was Andy in 1965. His greatest success as a feature film director came with Vanishing Point, an existential road movie that followed a man driving a white Dodge Challenger from Denver to San Francisco in 15 hours; critics disliked the movie, but it became a cult hit.

Besides The Twilight Zone, Sarafian's directing credits on television included episodes of Gunsmoke and Batman. In addition to Andy and Vanishing Point, he directed a number of feature films, including Run Wild, Run Free in 1969, Man in the Wilderness in 1971, and The Man Who Loved Cat Dancing in 1973. In his film acting career, he played a gangster in Bugsy in 1991, Paul Castellano in Gotti, and a hitman in Bulworth in 1998, and in 2001 he voiced the animated God Beaver character in Dr. Dolittle 2. On television, he played a coffee shop owner as a regular member of the cast of the 1985–1986 sitcom Foley Square.

== Personal life ==
Sarafian and Helen Altman Sarafian married, divorced, and remarried; she died in 2011. They had five children, including actor Richard Sarafian Jr., actor/director Deran Sarafian, special effects expert Damon B. Sarafian, screenwriter Tedi Sarafian, and Catherine Sarafian.

== Death ==
Sarafian died at the age of 83 in Santa Monica, California, on September 18, 2013, of pneumonia, which he contracted while recovering from a broken back.

== Filmography ==
=== Film ===
Director

Year	Title	Director	Writer	Producer
1962	Terror at Black Falls	Yes	Yes	Yes
1965	Andy	Yes	Yes	Yes
1969	Run Wild, Run Free	Yes	No	No
1970	Fragment of Fear	Yes	No	No
1971	Vanishing Point	Yes	No	No
1971	Man in the Wilderness	Yes	No	No
1973	Lolly-Madonna XXX	Yes	No	No
1973	The Man Who Loved Cat Dancing	Yes	No	No
1976	The Next Man	Yes	Yes	No
1979	Sunburn	Yes	No	No
1981	Gangster Wars	Yes	No	No
1984	The Bear	Yes	No	No
1986	Eye of the Tiger	Yes	No	No
1987	Street Justice	Yes	No	No
1990	Solar Crisis*	Yes	No	No

* Credited as "Alan Smithee"

Actor

Year	Title	Role	Notes
1956	The Magic Bond		Short
1976	The Next Man	Gregory Zolnikov	uncredited
1984	Songwriter	Rodeo Rocky	
1986	Alien Predator	Capt. J.J. Wells	voice, uncredited
1987	Street Justice	Taxi Driver	
1989	To Die For	Bartender	
1991	Bugsy	Jack Dragna	
1992	Ruby	Proby	
1994	Gunmen	Chief Chavez	
1994	Roadflower	Trucker	
1995	Don Juan DeMarco	Detective Sy Tobias	
1995	The Crossing Guard	Sunny Ventura	
1996	Bound	Gino Marzzone	
1998	Bulworth	Vinnie	
1999	Blink of an Eye	Erlik	
1999	Blue Streak	Uncle Lou	
2000	Picking Up the Pieces	Wino	
2001	Dr. Dolittle 2	God Beaver	voice
2002	Hitters		
2003	Masked and Anonymous	President	
2007	Reeling	Teeth	voice, short

=== Television ===
==== TV series ====
Director

Year	Title	Notes
1961	Maverick	episode: "The Forbidden City"
1961	Bronco	episode: "Guns of the Lawless"
1961	Surfside 6	episode: "Count Seven!"
1961	The Roaring 20's	episode: "Blondes Prefer Gentlemen"
1961–1962	Lawman	22 episodes
1961–1962	Cheyenne	2 episodes
1962	Hawaiian Eye	2 episodes
1962–1963	The Dakotas	3 episodes
1962–1963	The Gallant Men	9 episodes
1962–1963	77 Sunset Strip	3 episodes
1963	Redigo	episode: "Lady War-Bonnet"
1963	The Great Adventure	episode: "Six Wagons to the Sea"
1963	The Twilight Zone	episode: "Living Doll"
1963	Bonanza	episode: "The Waiting Game"
1963–1965	Ben Casey	3 episodes
1964	Dr. Kildare	episode: "An Exchange of Gifts"
1965	Slattery's People	4 episodes
1965	The Wild Wild West	2 episodes
1965	Convoy	episode: "Lady on the Rock"
1965	The Long, Hot Summer	episode: "Home Is a Nameless Place"
1965	The Big Valley	episode: "Winner Lose All"
1965	The Wackiest Ship in the Army	episode: "The Stowaway"
1965–1968	Gunsmoke	4 episodes
1966	The Trials of O'Brien	episode: "Alarums and Excursions"
1966	Batman	2 episodes
1966	Jericho	5 episodes
1966	The Girl from U.N.C.L.E.	episode: "The Romany Lie Affair"
1966–1968	I Spy	8 episodes
1967	Iron Horse	episode: "Consignment, Betsy the Boiler"
1967	The Guns of Will Sonnett	3 episodes
1967	Cimarron Strip	episode: "The Battle of Bloody Stones"
1967–1968	The Danny Thomas Hour	2 episodes
1968	Premiere	
1975	Doctors' Hospital	episode: "One of Our Own"
1981	The Gangster Chronicles	miniseries
1981	Shannon	2 episodes
1982	The Mississippi	episode: "The Mississippi"
1985	Wildside	3 episodes
1990	Zorro	episode: "Zorro: The Legend Continues" (unaired TV pilot)

Actor

Year	Title	Role	Notes
1985–1986	Foley Square	Spiro Papadopolis	14 episodes
1989	Wiseguy		episode: "Le Lacrime D'Amore: Part 2"
1990	MacGyver	Caspar Kasabian	episode: "Bitter Harvest"
1997	Michael Hayes	Restaurant Owner	episode: "Retribution"

==== TV movies ====
Director

- Shadow on the Land (1968)
- One of Our Own (1975)
- The African Queen (1977)
- A Killing Affair (1977)
- Disaster on the Coastliner (1977)
- The Golden Moment: An Olympic Love Story (1980)
- Splendor in the Grass (1981)
- Liberty (1986)

Actor

Year	Title	Role	Notes
1986	Long Time Gone	Omar	
1986	Liberty	Philbert Evans	
1993	Sex, Love and Cold Hard Cash	Abe	Uncredited
1996	Miami Hustle	Henry Kronfeld	
1996	Gotti	Paul Castellano	

== Awards ==
- Nominee, Gold Hugo, Best Feature Film – Chicago International Film Festival (The Next Man) (1976)
