= Shannon (1981 TV series) =

- Created by: Albert Ruben
- Starring: Kevin Dobson; Charles Fields; Karen Kondazian; Al Ruscio; Michael Durrell; William Lucking; Bruce Kirby
- Composer: John Cacavas
- Country of origin: United States
- Original language: English
- No. of seasons: 1
- No. of episodes: 9 (1 unaired)

Production
- Running time: 60 minutes
- Production companies: The Aubrey Company; Universal Television

Original release
- Network: CBS
- Release: November 11, 1981 – April 7, 1982

Shannon is an American crime drama series starring Kevin Dobson that aired for nine episodes on CBS during the 1981–82 television season.

== Cast ==
- Kevin Dobson as Det. Jack Shannon
- Charlie Fields as Shannon's son

== Episodes ==
Jack Shannon is a recent widower and police detective who moves from New York City to San Francisco with his young son.

No.	Title	Directed by	Written by	Original release date	Prod. code
1	"Gotham Swansong"	Richard Sarafian	Albert Ruben	November 11, 1981	56501
2	"Neither a Borrower"	Richard Sarafian	Albert Ruben	November 18, 1981	56502
3	"The Untouchable"	Gordon Hessler	Ken Pettus	November 25, 1981	58505
4	"Secret Rage"	Richard A. Colla	Patricia Joyce	December 2, 1981	56512
5	"Copscam"	Bernard L. Kowalski	Story by : David Michael Jacobs & William A. Schwartz; Teleplay by : William A. Schwartz & Colley Cibber	March 17, 1982	56510
6	"Favor for an Enemy"	Peter Carter	Paul F. Edwards	March 24, 1982	56523
7	"Beating the Prime"	Richard A. Colla	Paul F. Edwards	March 31, 1982	56507
8	"John's Awakening"	George McCowan	Carol Saraceno	April 7, 1982	56516
9	"Curtain Calls"	Gordon Hessler	Lee Kalcheim	Unaired	56515

== Reception ==
Shannon's first four episodes aired on CBS in fall 1981, in a Wednesday night lineup with Mr. Merlin, WKRP in Cincinnati, and Nurse. None of the shows found a strong audience, and Shannon's remaining episodes were shelved. In March and April 1982, four more episodes aired, again on Wednesday nights, with Herbie, the Love Bug, WKRP in Cincinnati, and Baker's Dozen; but it still ranked very low in the ratings, and was cancelled before the final produced episode aired.
