= Killer Wave =

- Written by: William Gray; Tedi Sarafian; George Malko
- Directed by: Bruce McDonald
- Starring: Angus Macfadyen; Karine Vanasse; Louis Philippe Dandenault; John Robinson; Tom Skerritt
- Theme music composer: Normand Corbeil
- Country of origin: United States
- Original language: English

Production
- Producers: Robert Halmi Sr.; Michael Prupas
- Cinematography: Pierre Jodoin
- Editor: Denis Papillon

Original release
- Release: January 10, 2007 – 2007

Killer Wave is a 2007 joint American-Canadian action-disaster TV mini-series, directed by Canadian filmmaker Bruce McDonald and written by Tedi Sarafian, George Malko, William Gray.

== Plot ==
The US east coast is suddenly struck by a type of a massive destructive force of nature usually only happening after a major earthquake in the Pacific and Indian Ocean rims: tidal waves of the destructive tsunami type. Scientist and fiction author John McAdams is forced to attend a type of Department of Homeland Security conference which concludes the phenomenon must be man-made, quite possibly abusing the findings of John's secret former Sea Lion project, but leaves questions of who wants to and has the means unanswered. Indeed, John and his colleague Sophie, a Québécois, soon find John set up for the murder of a potential whistleblower and are pursued by The FBI, Maine State Police and a pair of foreign ruthless assassins. Major destruction means major contracts for construction and coastal defenses, so building tycoons like Victor Bannister certainly have a considerable interest. The movie is two part mini-series originally aired in The UK.

== Cast ==
- Angus MacFadyen as John McAdams
- Karine Vanasse as Sophie Marleau
- John Robinson as Frank Brisick
- Tom Skerritt as Victor Bannister
- Stephen McHattie as Edgar Powell

== Production ==
McDonald began the production under the company Muse Entertainment Enterprises in June 2006. Filming initially took place in Montreal and Nova Scotia. The action thriller was shot in just seven weeks in Montreal and one week on the ocean shore in Nova Scotia, until August 2006. The $9.6 (USD) million mini-series is a production of Muse Entertainment Enterprises. Killer Wave was produced by Irene Litinsky and Michael Prupas, as executive producer was Robert Halmi Sr. of RHI Entertainment in work.

== Release ==
The international distributor is RHI International Distribution Inc. The Miniseries aired on 10 January 2007 in the United Kingdom and is available on streaming Netflix.

== See also ==
- Tidal Wave: No Escape, a 1997 American movie with a similar plot and identically named villain.
