= Julianne Phillips =

American model and actress (born 1960)

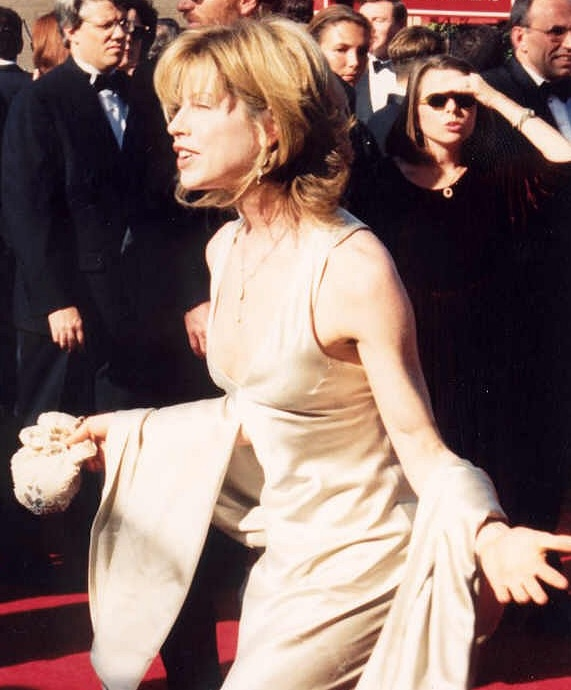
- Phillips at the 1994 Emmy Awards
- Born: May 6, 1960 (age 66); Evanston, Illinois, U.S.
- Occupations: Model; actress
- Years active: 1982–1997
- Spouse: Bruce Springsteen (m. 1985; div. 1989)

Julianne Phillips (born May 6, 1960) is an American former model and actress. She began her career as a model in the early 1980s before moving on to acting. She first attracted attention as the first wife of Bruce Springsteen and later for her role as Francesca "Frankie" Reed on the television drama series Sisters (1991–1996).

== Biography ==
Phillips was born in Evanston, Illinois, the youngest of six children in a Catholic family. She is the daughter of William Phillips, an insurance broker and executive, and his wife, Ann. She has four elder brothers and one elder sister. Phillips's family relocated to Oregon in her early years, settling in the affluent Portland suburb of Lake Oswego, where she was raised.

Phillips graduated from Lake Oswego High School and attended Brooks College in Long Beach, California.

=== Early career ===
After graduating from college, Phillips returned to Oregon and began appearing in local community theater productions. This led to her being signed by Elite Modeling Agency in 1982, who characterized her as a "perfect-ten package," earning as much as $2,000 a day. After modeling in New York City, Phillips moved to Los Angeles, where she appeared in the .38 Special music video for the song "If I'd Been the One." This led to Phillips' acting roles in 1984's made-for-TV movies His Mistress, in which she co-starred with Robert Urich, and Summer Fantasy. She also appeared at the end of then-husband Bruce Springsteen's music video "Glory Days."

=== Marriage and divorce ===
Phillips garnered publicity as the girlfriend and, later, the first wife of musician Bruce Springsteen. The two met in October 1984 and were subsequently married in her native Lake Oswego shortly after midnight on Monday, May 13, 1985, surrounded by intense media attention. Citing irreconcilable differences, she filed for divorce in August 1988, which was finalized the following March. Following the divorce, neither party commented publicly on their relationship until Springsteen's autobiography Born to Run where he describes the marriage from his point of view.

=== Acting career ===
Phillips continued her acting career during and after the marriage. She appeared in Odd Jobs (1986), Sweet Lies (1988), and Seven Hours to Judgment (1988), and starred opposite Chevy Chase in Fletch Lives and John Ritter in Skin Deep both in 1989.

Two years later, she accepted the role of Frankie Reed, the business-oriented character on Sisters; it became her best-known role. She left the show at the end of its fifth season in 1995, returning for its final episode in 1996. She then briefly returned to movies, appearing in Big Bully (1996), Colin Fitz Lives! (1997), Allie & Me (1997), and the made-for-TV disaster film Tidal Wave: No Escape (1997).

=== 1997–present ===
Phillips stopped acting in 1997 and has rarely been in the public eye since. In 2001, she was interviewed on an episode of the biographical documentary series Intimate Portrait that profiled her Sisters co-star Sela Ward. In 2014, she reunited with Ward and her other Sisters co-stars, Swoosie Kurtz and Patricia Kalember, for Entertainment Weekly. The reunion was documented on Today.

== Filmography ==
Film
Year	Title	Role	Notes
1983	If I'd Been the One	Woman	(Music video)
1985	Bruce Springsteen: Glory Days	Woman	(Music video)
1986	Odd Jobs	Sally	
1986	A Fine Mess	Loraine	uncredited
1987	Sweet Lies	Dixie	
1988	Seven Hours to Judgment	Lisa Eden	
1989	Skin Deep	Molly	
1989	Fletch Lives	Becky Culpepper	
1996	Big Bully	Victoria Tucker	
1996	Hollywood Boulevard	Linda Morgan / Sarah Constance Banks	
1997	Colin Fitz Lives!	Justice Fitz	
1997	Allie & Me	Angela Nansky	

Television
Year	Title	Role	Notes
1984	Summer Fantasy	Joanna Brannigan	TV movie
1984	His Mistress	Anne Davis	TV movie
1990	Midnight Caller	Danielle Hopkins	Episode: "The Class of 1980"
1992	Getting Up and Going Home	Janet	TV movie
1993	The Only Way Out	Susannah	TV movie
1994	The Larry Sanders Show	Julianne Phillips	Episode: "The Mr. Sharon Stone Show"
1995	A Vow to Kill	Rachel Waring	TV movie
1995	Original Sins	Becka Sharp	TV movie
1995	Where's the Money, Noreen?	Noreen Rafferty	TV movie
1991–1996	Sisters	Francesca 'Frankie' Reed Margolis	93 episodes
1997	Tidal Wave: No Escape	Jessica Weaver	TV movie
