= African Skies =

Television series, 1992–1994

- Genre: Drama
- Created by: Phil Savath; Larry Mollin
- Directed by: Peter Rowe; Jeff Woolnough; and others
- Starring: Catherine Bach; Robert Mitchum; Raimund Harmstorf
- Composer: Eric Allaman
- Countries of origin: Canada; United States
- Original language: English
- No. of seasons: 2
- No. of episodes: 52

Production
- Running time: 30 minutes
- Production companies: Franklin/Waterman Entertainment; The Family Channel; Atlantis Films

Original release
- Network: The Family Channel
- Release: October 11, 1992 – April 24, 1994

African Skies is an adventure drama series that aired from October 11, 1992, until April 24, 1994, on The Family Channel. It starred Catherine Bach and Robert Mitchum. It was shot in Kenya, Zimbabwe and then in South Africa.

== Plot summary ==
An adventure-drama series about two male teenagers, one black and one white, living in post-Apartheid South Africa. Rory lives with his mother on a large range out in the countryside, while Jam lives with his mother while his father runs a medical clinic far away. Together, the two friends get into different adventures, often having to rely on each other to get out of trouble.

== Cast ==
- Catherine Bach as Margo Dutton
- Simon James as Rory Dutton
- Rouxnet Brown as Jam Mathiba
- Robert Mitchum as Sam Dutton
- Nakedi Ribane as Nyasa Mathiba
- Raimund Harmstorf as Raimund

== Episodes ==
=== Season 1 (1992–93) ===
No. overall	No. in season	Title	Directed by	Written by	Original release date
1	1	"The Rainmaker"	Neill Fearnley	Phil Savath & Jack Corso	October 11, 1992
2	2	"Romeo and Jambele"	Peter Rowe	Phil Savath & Jack Corso	October 18, 1992
3	3	"Cruel to Be Kind"	Peter Rowe	Larry Mollin & Phil Savath	October 25, 1992
4	4	"The Flies"	Peter Rowe	Dennis Foon	November 1, 1992
5	5	"Red Winds"	Peter Rowe	Phil Savath & Jack Corso	November 8, 1992
6	6	"Rites of Passage"	Neill Fearnley	Phil Savath & Jack Corso	November 15, 1992
7	7	"Mountain Man"	Peter Rowe	Larry Mollin & Phil Savath	November 22, 1992
8	8	"Take Your Best Shot"	Neill Fearnley	Larry Mollin & Phil Savath	November 29, 1992
9	9	"The Gift"	Peter Rowe	Larry Mollin & Phil Savath	December 6, 1992
10	10	"Children of the Dust"	Peter Rowe	Unknown	December 13, 1992
11	11	"Wildfire"	Jeff Woolnough	Unknown	December 20, 1992
12	12	"Architect"	Neill Fearnley	Unknown	December 27, 1992
13	13	"The Hunted"	Peter Rowe	Unknown	January 3, 1993
14	14	"The Lost Crown"	Peter Rowe	Unknown	January 10, 1993
15	15	"Pay the Piper"	Peter Rowe	Unknown	January 17, 1993
16	16	"So... Where to Now?"	Peter Rowe	Unknown	January 24, 1993
17	17	"Safety Last"	Jeff Woolnough	Unknown	January 31, 1993
18	18	"The Foul"	Jeff Woolnough	Unknown	February 7, 1993
19	19	"Inside Moves"	Dug Rotstein	Unknown	February 14, 1993
20	20	"Smoke"	Jeff Woolnough	Unknown	February 21, 1993
21	21	"Crocodile Tears"	Dug Rotstein	Unknown	February 28, 1993
22	22	"Aid and Comfort"	Jeff Woolnough	Unknown	March 7, 1993
23	23	"Quarantine"	Clark Johnson	Unknown	March 14, 1993
24	24	"The Goat"	Peter Rowe	Unknown	March 21, 1993
25	25	"Waste Not"	Neill Fearnley	Unknown	March 28, 1993
26	26	"Wild Child"	Peter Rowe	Unknown	April 4, 1993

=== Season 2 (1993–94) ===
No. overall	No. in season	Title	Directed by	Written by	Original release date
27	1	"The Bottom Line"	Bill Corcoran	Unknown	October 9, 1993
28	2	"The One That Got Away"	Peter Rowe	Leila Basen	October 16, 1993
29	3	"Children in Chains"	Unknown	Unknown	October 23, 1993
30	4	"Swing Vote"	Unknown	Unknown	October 30, 1993
31	5	"Extinct is Forever"	Unknown	Unknown	November 6, 1993
32	6	"Market Day"	Peter Rowe	Phil Savath & Larry Molin	November 13, 1993
33	7	"Woman Alone"	Unknown	Unknown	November 20, 1993
34	8	"Ancient History"	Unknown	Unknown	December 4, 1993
35	9	"Question of the Heart"	Unknown	Unknown	December 11, 1993
36	10	"A Bone to Pick"	Unknown	Unknown	December 18, 1993
37	11	"Ties That Bind"	Unknown	Unknown	January 1, 1994
38	12	"Diamonds Aren't Forever"	Bill Corcoran	Unknown	January 8, 1994
39	13	"Baby Talk"	Otta Hanus	Dennis Foon	January 15, 1994
40	14	"The Writing on the Wall"	Unknown	Unknown	January 22, 1994
41	15	"Payback"	Unknown	Unknown	January 29, 1994
42	16	"Pet Shop Boys"	Unknown	Unknown	February 5, 1994
43	17	"The Lion Sleeps Tonight"	Unknown	Unknown	February 12, 1994
44	18	"Samson and Charley"	Unknown	Unknown	February 26, 1994
45	19	"Fear of Wages"	Unknown	Unknown	March 5, 1994
46	20	"Under Pressure"	Unknown	Unknown	March 12, 1994
47	21	"Road to Nowhere"	Unknown	Unknown	March 19, 1994
48	22	"Head in the Sand"	Unknown	Unknown	March 26, 1994
49	23	"Noah and the Arc"	Unknown	Unknown	April 2, 1994
50	24	"Natural Beauty"	Unknown	Unknown	April 9, 1994
51	25	"Star Turn"	Unknown	Unknown	April 16, 1994
52	26	"Poker Face"	Unknown	Unknown	April 23, 1994
