= James Nelson (sound editor) =

American sound editor and film producer

- Born: James M. Falkinburg; September 25, 1932; California, U.S.
- Died: June 18, 2014 (aged 81); California, U.S.
- Occupations: Sound editor, sound designer, film producer, post-production supervisor, production and post-production advisor
- Years active: 1949–1994
- Spouse: Barbara

James M. Falkinburg (September 25, 1932 – June 18, 2014), known in the entertainment industry as James "Jim" Nelson, was an American sound editor, film producer and post-production supervisor.

As a sound editor, Nelson worked on many of the iconic films and television programs of the 1950s, '60s and '70s, including Rock Around the Clock, The Monkees, the beach party films, The Brady Bunch, Easy Rider, Five Easy Pieces and The Exorcist. In total, he edited the sound effects for over 100 films and 38 television programs comprising more than 1,700 episodes, as well as several made-for-TV movies, documentaries and television specials.

Expanding into film production in the 1970s, Nelson helped George Lucas in launching Industrial Light & Magic and took part in the making of the first Star Wars. Nelson worked in a production capacity on 20 other films, including The China Syndrome, Ghostbusters and Big Trouble in Little China.

== Personal life ==
James M. Falkinburg was born in California on September 25, 1932. He grew up in a show business family; his grandparents were stage actors and his father was Sam Nelson, a silent movie actor (The Circus Kid) who later became a film director (Mandrake the Magician; Sagebrush Law) and assistant director (The Lady from Shanghai; Some Like It Hot).

Nelson died in California on June 18, 2014, at the age of 81; no other details about his death were given. Among his survivors are his wife of 36 years, Barbara; his two daughters, Kimberley and Leslie; and his younger brother, The Black Hole director Gary Nelson.

== Career ==
=== Sound editing ===
==== Early film and TV work, API and Edit-Rite ====
Falkinberg began working in the film industry at the age of 17, taking the name of James "Jim" Nelson. He became a sound effects editor in 1954, starting with the TV drama series Medic. His first feature films as sound editor were the 1956 release Rock Around the Clock—considered to be the first true rock and roll musical film—and its immediate follow-up, Don't Knock the Rock.

Over the next 10 years, Nelson served as supervising sound editor on such TV programs as The Donna Reed Show, Father Knows Best, Naked City, Dennis the Menace, Hazel, The Andy Griffith Show and Get Smart. Some of the films Nelson worked on during this period were The Girl Most Likely, Birdman of Alcatraz, Bye Bye Birdie and the first six of American International Pictures' (AIP) seven beach party films, from Beach Party (1963) to How to Stuff a Wild Bikini (1965). He also worked on related AIP productions such as Ski Party and Dr. Goldfoot and the Bikini Machine.

In 1965, Nelson co-founded Edit-Rite, considered to have been "the premier post-production facility of its time." Much of the sound editing he did between 1965 and 1972 was done at this facility.

==== Counterculture and New Hollywood ====
Nelson served as supervising sound editor on several television shows which grew out of the counterculture movement of the '60s. His first such project was The Monkees, starring the pop/rock band of the same name. The other counterculture-related TV shows on which Nelson worked were Love, American Style, H.R. Pufnstuf and The Brady Bunch.

Nelson was also supervising sound editor on many of the iconic films of the "New Hollywood" or "American New Wave" movement in the late '60s and early '70s. Just as this "New Wave" was influenced by 1960s counterculture, so too was Nelson's involvement with "New Hollywood" a result of his counterculture-related projects. After The Monkees ended its run in 1968, series creators Bob Rafelson and Bert Schneider brought in Nelson to work on The Monkees' first and only feature film, Head, which was directed by Rafelson. This led to Nelson being hired as supervising sound editor of the landmark counterculture film Easy Rider, on which Rafelson and Schneider served as producers. Nelson's collaboration with Rafelson extended to three other milestone "New Wave" films: Five Easy Pieces and The King of Marvin Gardens, both directed by Rafelson, and Peter Bogdanovich's The Last Picture Show.

Among the other "New Hollywood" films on which Nelson worked were Two-Lane Blacktop (one of many films he did for producer/director Monte Hellman), Bob Fosse's Cabaret, Terrence Malick's Badlands, George Lucas' American Graffiti and William Friedkin's The Exorcist. The latter film earned Nelson a Golden Reel Award from the Motion Picture Sound Editors; he won another for Richard Rush's Freebie and the Bean.

==== ILM, EEG/Boss Film and producing career ====
Nelson expanded into film production in 1972 with the formation of his own company, James Nelson Enterprises.

In 1975, George Lucas–with whom Nelson had worked on American Graffiti–recruited Nelson to help in the formation of visual effects company Industrial Light & Magic (ILM). From 1975 through 1977, Nelson oversaw the administration and management of ILM, helping to build the company from scratch in a warehouse near Van Nuys Airport. Among those he was responsible for hiring at ILM was John Dykstra. During this time, Nelson also functioned as Associate Producer on the film for which ILM was launched, Star Wars. Nelson is not credited in the final film, however; he is said to have had his name removed from the credits following a disagreement with Lucas.

Nelson went on to serve as Associate Producer on the acclaimed 1979 film The China Syndrome, for which he was also Unit Production Manager. He then produced Borderline, starring Charles Bronson.

In 1984, Nelson assisted Richard Edlund in founding Boss Film Studios, launched through the acquisition of Douglas Trumbull's Entertainment Effects Group (EEG). Nelson spent the next four years at the company as Vice-President and production advisor. While at EEG/Boss, Nelson consulted on such films as Ghostbusters, 2010, Fright Night, Big Trouble in Little China and The Monster Squad. Nelson and Edlund later produced the 1990 science fiction film Solar Crisis.

Nelson semi-retired in 1994, after executive producing The Seventh Coin, though he still occasionally served as an advisor and mentor.

== Selected filmography ==
=== Sound editing ===
Film
| Year | Title | Director | Notes |
|---|---|---|---|
| 1956 | Rock Around the Clock | Fred F. Sears | First feature film as sound editor |
| 1956 | Don't Knock the Rock | Fred F. Sears | |
| 1957 | The James Dean Story | Robert Altman, George W. George | |
| 1958 | The Girl Most Likely | Mitchell Leisen | |
| 1962 | Walk on the Wild Side | Edward Dmytryk | |
| 1962 | Experiment in Terror | Blake Edwards | |
| 1962 | Birdman of Alcatraz | John Frankenheimer | |
| 1963 | Bye Bye Birdie | George Sidney | |
| 1963 | Beach Party | William Asher | First of six beach party movies he worked on for AIP |
| 1963 | The Comedy of Terrors | Jacques Tourneur | |
| 1964 | Muscle Beach Party | William Asher | |
| 1964 | Bikini Beach | William Asher | |
| 1964 | Pajama Party | Don Weis | |
| 1964 | Beach Blanket Bingo | William Asher | |
| 1965 | How to Stuff a Wild Bikini | William Asher | |
| 1966 | The Wild Angels | Roger Corman | |
| 1966 | Ride in the Whirlwind | Monte Hellman | |
| 1966 | The Shooting (1966) | Monte Hellman | |
| 1967 | The War Wagon | Burt Kennedy | |
| 1968 | Psych-Out | Richard Rush | |
| 1968 | Head | Bob Rafelson | |
| 1969 | Easy Rider | Dennis Hopper | |
| 1970 | Five Easy Pieces | Bob Rafelson | |
| 1971 | Johnny Got His Gun | Dalton Trumbo | |
| 1971 | Drive, He Said | Jack Nicholson | |
| 1971 | Two-Lane Blacktop | Monte Hellman | |
| 1971 | The Last Picture Show | Peter Bogdanovich | |
| 1972 | Cabaret | Bob Fosse | |
| 1972 | The Candidate | Michael Ritchie | |
| 1973 | The Exorcist | William Friedkin | Won Golden Reel Award for Best Sound Editing - Sound Effects |
| 1973 | American Graffiti | George Lucas | |
| 1973 | Badlands | Terrence Malick | |
| 1974 | Freebie and the Bean | Richard Rush | Won Golden Reel Award for Best Sound Editing - Sound Effects |

Television
| Year | Title | Notes |
|---|---|---|
| 1954-1956 | Medic | at least 7 episodes |
| 1957-1960 | Father Knows Best | 55 episodes |
| 1958-1959 | The Adventures of Rin Tin Tin | 25 episodes |
| 1958-1964 | The Donna Reed Show | 218 episodes |
| 1958-1962 | Naked City | 104 episodes |
| 1959-1960 | Manhunt | 39 episodes |
| 1959-1963 | Dennis the Menace | 76 episodes |
| 1961-1965 | Hazel | 114 episodes |
| 1965-1966 | The Andy Griffith Show | 30 episodes |
| 1965-1966 | The Legend of Jesse James | 33 episodes |
| 1966-1967 | Get Smart | 30 episodes |
| 1966-1968 | The Monkees | 58 episodes |
| 1966-1968 | Tarzan | 59 episodes |
| 1967-1969 | The Mothers-In-Law | 56 episodes |
| 1969-1970 | H.R. Pufnstuf | 16 episodes |
| 1969-1971 | Love, American Style | 48 episodes, |
| 1969-1971 | The Brady Bunch | 49 episodes |

=== Film production ===
As producer
| Year | Title | Notes |
|---|---|---|
| 1977 | Star Wars | Associate producer (uncredited) |
| 1979 | The China Syndrome | Associate producer, unit production manager |
| 1980 | Borderline | |
| 1990 | Solar Crisis | |
| 1993 | The Seventh Coin | Executive Producer |

As advisor for EEG/Boss Film
| Year | Title |
|---|---|
| 1984 | Ghostbusters |
| 1984 | 2010 |
| 1985 | Fright Night |
| 1986 | Poltergeist II: The Other Side |
| 1986 | Big Trouble in Little China |
| 1987 | Masters of the Universe |
| 1987 | The Monster Squad |
