= The Gangster Chronicles =

- Written by: David Assael; Art Eisenson; Stephen McPherson; Mark Rodgers
- Directed by: Richard C. Sarafian
- Starring: Michael Nouri; Joe Penny; Jon Polito; Madeleine Stowe; Markie Post; Robert Davi; Brian Benben; Louis Giambalvo; E.G. Marshall; Karen Kondazian
- Theme music composer: Billy Goldenberg
- Country of origin: United States
- No. of seasons: 1
- No. of episodes: 13

Production
- Executive producer: Matthew Rapf
- Production locations: Capitola, California; Santa Cruz, California
- Running time: 60 minutes per episode; 780 minutes total

Original release
- Network: NBC
- Release: February 12 – May 8, 1981

The Gangster Chronicles is a 1981 American crime drama television miniseries starring Michael Nouri, Joe Penny, Jon Polito, Louis Giambalvo, Kathleen Lloyd, Madeleine Stowe, Chad Redding, Markie Post, Allan Arbus, James Andronica, Robert Davi, Joseph Mascolo, and narrated by E.G. Marshall.

== Overview ==
A historically-based crime drama about the lives of gangsters Bugsy Siegel, Lucky Luciano and Meyer Lansky. Covering seven decades, starting in 1907.

== Cast ==
- Michael Nouri as Charles "Lucky" Luciano
- Joe Penny as Benny "Bugsy" Siegel
- Brian Benben as Michael Lasker (The character was based on real life Jewish gangster Meyer Lansky who was still alive when the series went to production. The character's name was changed to Michael Lasker to avoid legal complications)
- Jon Polito as Tommy "Three Finger Brown" Lucchese
- George DiCenzo as Arnold Rothstein
- Kathleen Lloyd as Stella Siegel
- Madeleine Stowe as Ruth Lasker
- Chad Redding as Joy Osler
- Robert Burke as Inspector Reardon
- Markie Post as Chris Brennan
- Allan Arbus as Goodman
- Louis Giambalvo as Al Capone
- James Andronica as Frank Costello
- Robert Davi as Vito Genovese
- Joseph Mascolo as Salvatore Maranzano
- David Wilson as Vincent "Mad Dog" Coll
- Kenneth Tigar as Thomas E. Dewey
- Richard S. Castellano as Giuseppe "Joe The Boss" Masseria
- Jonathan Banks as Dutch Schultz
- Karen Kondazian as Mrs. Luciano
- Michael Ensign as Owen "Owney The Killer" Madden
- Thom Rachford as Charles "King" Solomon
- Vincent Schiavelli as Jacob "Gurrah" Shapiro

== Episodes ==
There were thirteen 60-minute episodes. Although there were 13 episodes, the entire series was only aired over 9 nights. The premiere consisted of the first 3 episodes. On two subsequent airings, there were 2 episodes shown on both nights with the other six weekly airings consisting of only 1 episode each.

No.	Title	Original release date
1	"Chapter 1"	February 12, 1981
2	"Chapter 2"	February 12, 1981
3	"Chapter 3"	February 12, 1981
4	"Chapter 4"	February 21, 1981
5	"Chapter 5"	February 28, 1981
6	"Chapter 6"	March 7, 1981
7	"Chapter 7"	March 14, 1981
8	"Chapter 8"	March 21, 1981
9	"Chapter 9"	April 24, 1981
10	"Chapter 10"	April 24, 1981
11	"Chapter 11"	May 1, 1981
12	"Chapter 12"	May 1, 1981
13	"Chapter 13"	May 8, 1981

== Gangster Wars ==
Gangster Wars
- Directed by: Richard C. Sarafian
- Written by: Richard DeKoker
- Produced by: Stuart Cohen
- Starring: Michael Nouri Joe Penny Brian Benben Kathleen Lloyd Madeleine Stowe Markie Post Allan Arbus Louis Giambalvo James Andronica Robert Davi Joseph Mascolo Kenneth Tigar Richard S. Castellano Jon Polito Jonathan Banks George DiCenzo Robert F. Lyons Richard Foronjy Karen Kondazian
- Music by: John Cacavas
- Distributed by: CIC
- Release date: October 9, 1981
- Running time: 121 min.
- Language: English

Gangster Wars is a 1981 American crime film directed by Richard C. Sarafian and based on the original Gangster Chronicles telecast. The film tells the story of three teenagers, based on real life gangsters Charles "Lucky" Luciano (Michael Nouri), Benjamin "Bugsy" Siegel (Joe Penny) and Michael Lasker (Brian Benben) (a fictional character who was most likely modeled after Meyer Lansky), growing up in New York's ghettos during the early 1900s to their rise through organized crime.

This movie was a three-hour opener for the subsequent miniseries. In addition to the characters above Brian Benben's character is a fictional composite of several mobsters (here named "Michael Lasker"). While the miniseries covered seven decades, the opener takes us from 1907 to the Prohibition era of the 1920s. After its initial run, the entire Gangster Chronicles saga was boiled down to 121 minutes and released to videocassette as Gangster Wars.

== Sources ==
- Brooks, Tim; Marsh, Earle F. (2007). The Complete Directory to Prime Time Network and Cable TV Shows, 1946-Present. New York City: Ballantine Books. p. 517. ISBN 978-0345497734.
- Terrace, Vincent (2013). Encyclopedia of Television Series, Pilots and Specials. New York City: McFarland & Company. p. 161. ISBN 978-0786474455.
