= Death Warrant (film) =

1990 American action thriller film by Deran Sarafian

- Theatrical release poster
- Directed by: Deran Sarafian
- Written by: David S. Goyer
- Produced by: Mark di Salle
- Starring: Jean-Claude Van Damme; Robert Guillaume; Cynthia Gibb; George Dickerson; Patrick Kilpatrick
- Cinematography: Russell Carpenter
- Edited by: John A. Barton; Cheryl Kroll; G. Gregg McLaughlin
- Music by: Gary Chang
- Production company: MGM-Pathé Communications
- Distributed by: Metro-Goldwyn-Mayer
- Release date: September 14, 1990
- Running time: 89 minutes
- Country: United States
- Language: English
- Budget: $6 million
- Box office: $46.7 million

Death Warrant is a 1990 American prison action thriller film directed by Deran Sarafian, produced by Mark di Salle, and starring Jean-Claude Van Damme. The film was written by David S. Goyer while a student at USC, and was Goyer's first screenplay to be sold and produced commercially. In the film, police detective Louis Burke is going into a prison facility in California as an undercover cop in order to find out who was behind a mysterious series of murders, and finds himself locked up with his nemesis: Christian Naylor, a psychotic serial killer who calls himself "The Sandman," who sets out to exact revenge upon him after getting into prison.

Death Warrant was released on September 14, 1990. Upon its release, the film grossed $46 million against a production budget of only $6 million. The film received negative reviews from critics who found the direction, its storyline, villain, and the plot poor, but highly praised the acting as well as the action scenes and the thrilling atmosphere.

== Plot ==
Detective Louis Burke of the Royal Canadian Mounted Police from Quebec confronts the maniac that killed his partner: a psychopathic serial killer who calls himself "The Sandman". Burke searches an abandoned house in Los Angeles, where he comes across a series of bodies hanging from the ceiling, and is then attacked by the Sandman. Burke shoots the Sandman several times in the chest, apparently killing him.

Sixteen months later, Burke joins a task force assembled by the governor to investigate a series of murders in the Harrison State Prison in California. While Burke poses as an inmate, attorney Amanda Beckett acts as his wife. Burke goes undercover and is interned in the state penitentiary, where he befriends his cellmate Konefke and clerk Hawkins. Despite Burke saving Hawkins from a confrontation with a gang, neither he nor Konefke will talk about the recent murders. Burke is able to track down Mayerson, the cellmate of the most recent victim, who works at the infirmary, but he also refuses to talk. When Burke threatens him, Mayerson reveals that he doesn't know what's going on, but that the guards are involved and that there is an "outside man." He sends Burke to talk to Priest, who gets him a key to the records room.

In the records room, Burke finds Barrett's death certificate covered in codes. He feeds the codes to Beckett and connects her with a teenage hacker, Tisdale, who determines the codes come from the infirmary. With help from Priest and Hawkins, Burke breaks into the infirmary and finds several boxes labeled "medical waste" that are actually full of human organs.

Later, a new inmate arrives; Burke is horrified to find that it's the Sandman. The Sandman recognizes Burke and briefly apprehends him; instead of killing Burke, the Sandman reveals to their fellow prisoners that Burke is a cop.

Meanwhile, Beckett and Tisdale decipher a code they find in the computer, which comprises prisoner identification numbers followed by their blood type. None of the inmates on the list have drug-related crimes, and they are mostly young, first-time offenders. All of the ID numbers match those of prisoners who have been murdered. Beckett identifies it as a "hit list", and tips off Burke that he's next on the list. During the night, Burke's cell is attacked: he manages to fend off the attackers, but Konefke is killed. Burke is dragged off by the guards and interrogated by Sgt. de Graff.

Later, Beckett attends a party hosted by the state's attorney general, Tom Vogler. Beckett believes that her boss, Ben Keane, is responsible for the murders, and prepares to tell Vogler of her theory. However, just as she is about to do so, she receives a call from Tisdale, who tells her that the man behind the murders is in fact Vogler.

Vogler produces a gun and reveals to Beckett that his wife needed a liver transplant, and when it turned out that even his money and influence couldn't move her up the donor list in time, he created a conspiracy to murder healthy prisoners for organs. After his wife's transplant, he continued the scheme for profit. He also reveals that he sent the Sandman to assassinate Burke, because Burke was too hard for the other inmates to kill. When his wife unexpectedly enters the room, Beckett escapes.

In the prison, Burke escapes his cell and the Sandman opens all the other cells to create a riot. Priest and Hawkins help him evade the guards; Hawkins is injured but saved by Priest, but Priest is then killed by the Sandman. The scene culminates in a showdown between Sandman and Burke with the inmates looking on. At first, the Sandman gets the better of the fight, but when he opens the door to the boiler room to throw Burke into it, Burke turns the tables by kicking the Sandman into the flames. However, the Sandman emerges from the boiler, grossly burned. Burke kicks him again, this time sending him careering backward into a pillar, where his head is impaled on a valve stem. Despite this mortal injury, stuck to the valve, the Sandman continues to taunt Burke: "You can't kill me, Burke. I'm the Sandman."

Burke responds by twisting the Sandman's head around; the valve stem inflicts damage on the Sandman's brain, finally killing him. The inmates quietly allow Burke to leave the prison, where he is reunited with Hawkins and Beckett.

== Cast ==
- Jean-Claude Van Damme as Detective Louis Burke
- Robert Guillaume as Hawkins
- Cynthia Gibb as Amanda Beckett
- George Dickerson as Tom Vogler
- Art LaFleur as Sergeant De Graff
- Patrick Kilpatrick as Christian "The Sandman" Naylor
- Abdul Salaam El-Razzac as Priest
- Armin Shimerman as Dr. Gottesman
- Joshua John Miller as Douglas Tisdale
- Larry Hankin as Mayerson
- Hank Stone as Romaker
- Conrad Dunn as Konefke
- Joe Dassa as Cop With Inmate

== Production ==
=== Development and writing ===
The film was originally known as Dusted. It was the second script ever written by David S. Goyer and the first one he sold.

=== Filming ===
Filming started August 1989.

== Reception ==
=== Box office ===
The film debuted strongly at the box office, opening with a $5 million weekend to place No. 3. It would gross over $16 million at the domestic box office.

=== Critical response ===
On Rotten Tomatoes the film has a rating of 11% based on 9 reviews. On Metacritic the film has a weighted average score of 34 out of 100, based on 9 critics, indicating "generally unfavorable" reviews.
