= Tedi Sarafian =

American screenwriter

- Born: United States
- Occupations: Screenwriter, film producer, film director, CEO of Barefoot Sound
- Father: Richard C. Sarafian
- Relatives: Robert Altman (uncle)

Tedi Sarafian is an American screenwriter. He was a co-writer of Terminator 3: Rise of the Machines (2003). He is the son of Richard C. Sarafian, and the brother of Richard Sarafian Jr. and Deran Sarafian and the nephew of Robert Altman. He is also co-owner of Barefoot Sound, manufacturer of high-end recording monitors.

== Filmography ==
=== Films ===
- Tank Girl (1995, writer)
- The Road Killers (1994, writer/co-producer)
- Rush Hour (1998, uncredited writer)
- Terminator 3: Rise of the Machines (2003, story)
- The Possession of Michael King (2013, co-executive producer/writer/story)
- Altergeist (2014, writer/director)

=== Television ===
- Killer Wave (2007, writer/co-executive producer)
- Tidal Wave: No Escape (1997, writer/co-executive producer)
