= Peter Lopez (attorney) =

American attorney

- Born: Peter Michael Lopez; June 7, 1949; San Francisco, California, U.S.
- Died: April 30, 2010 (aged 60); Encino, Los Angeles, California, U.S.
- Resting place: Westwood Memorial Park
- Education: UCLA
- Spouse(s): Catherine Bach (m. 1990; his death 2010)
- Children: 3

Peter Lopez (June 7, 1949 – April 30, 2010) was an American entertainment attorney, music manager, and film producer. He represented talent including Michael Jackson, Glenn Frey, Andrea Bocelli, Julio Iglesias, Michael Buble among the notable artists, worked closely with Jimmy Iovine, and was a producer of the Jennifer Lopez film Selena. Lopez was a partner at Kleinberg Lopez Lange Cuddy & Klein.

== Early life and education ==
In 1971, Lopez received his undergraduate degree from UCLA and his Juris Doctor three years later from the same school. He was admitted to the State Bar in 1974.

== Career ==
Peter Lopez began his career as an attorney in Los Angeles, in 1974. Over the span of his career, he represented Michael Jackson, Glenn Frey, Andrea Bocelli, Julio Iglesias, Mónica Naranjo,Michael Buble, Gerardo, Babyface, Laura Pausini, Il Volo, Manterola, among his many notable clients. Lopez co-produced the Jennifer Lopez biopic “Selena”, López served as legal counsel for the Mexican rock band Maná, helping negotiate key recording and publishing agreements during the 1990s and 2000s.

He had a close working relationship with Jimmy Iovine and Interscope.

In 2009, Lopez was appointed by Governor Arnold Schwarzenegger to the California Exposition and State Fair Board of Directors and to the State Athletic Commission.

== Personal life ==
Peter Lopez was married to American actress Catherine Bach from 1990 until his death in 2010. They had two daughters together.

On April 30, 2010, Peter Lopez was found dead at his Encino home in an apparent suicide after gunshots were heard and police arrived. A funeral was held at Santa Monica Catholic Church in Santa Monica, California. He had a son from a previous marriage. Pallbearers included Billy Bush, Oscar De La Hoya, Sugar Ray Leonard and his son, Michael, along with family and friends including Maria Shriver, LA Mayor Antonio Villaraigosa; Cheech Marin and Kenneth “Babyface” Edmonds.
