= Mon Histoire =

French-language children's book series

Mon Histoire is a French series based on the Dear America and Dear Canada series. The books are written in French and each one is in the style of a diary based on true events. While most of the characters are fictional, some of them are based on historical personages, such as Marie Antoinette. Most of the books are set in France. They are published by Gallimard Jeunesse.

== Books ==
| Title | English Translation | Location | Year | Author | Published |
|---|---|---|---|---|---|
| SOS Titanic: Journal de Julia Facchini | SOS Titanic: Journal of Julia Facchini | RMS Titanic | 1912 | Christine Féret-Fleury | 2005 |
| Pendant la guerre de Cent Ans: Journal de Jeanne Letourneur | During the Hundred Years' War | | 1418 | Brigitte Coppin | 2005 |
| Marie-Antoinette: Princesse autrichienne à Versailles | Marie-Antoinette: Austrian Princess in Versailles | Versailles | 1769-1771 | Kathryn Lasky and Lilas Nord | 2005 |
| Dans Paris occupé: Journal d'Hélène Pitrou | In Occupied Paris | Occupied France | 1940-1945 | Paule Du Bouchet | 2005 |
| Cléopâtre, fille du Nil | Cleopatra, Girl of the Nile | Egypt | 57-55 avant J.-C. | Kristiana Gregory and Marie Saint-Dizier | 2005 |
| Je suis une esclave: Journal de Clotée | I Am a Slave | | 1859-1860 | Patricia-C McKissack and Bee Formentelli | 2005 |
| Le sourire de Joséphine | Josephine's Smile | | | Claude Helft | 2005 |
| Nzingha, princesse africaine | Nzingha, African Princess | | 1595-1596 | Patricia-C McKissack and Marie Saint-Dizier | 2006 |
| En route vers le Nouveau Monde: Journal d'Esther Whipple | On Route to the New World | | 1620-1621 | Kathryn Lasky and Bee Formentelli | 2006 |
| Le Temps des cerises: Journal de Mathilde | The Time of Cherries | | 1870-1871 | Christine Féret-Fleury | 2006 |
| Catherine, princesse de Russie | Catherine, Russian Princess | Russia | 1743-1745 | Kristiana Gregory | 2006 |
| Pendant la famine, en Irlande: Journal de Phyllis McCormack | During the Famine in Ireland | Ireland | 1845-1847 | Carol Drinkwater and Bee Formentelli | 2006 |
| Sous la Révolution française: Journal de Louise Médréac | Under the French Revolution | | 1789-1791 | Dominique Joly | 2006 |
| Marie Stuart: Reine d'Ecosse à la cour de France | Mary Stuart: Queen of Scotland at the Court of France | | 1553-1554 | Kathryn Lasky and Julie Lafon | 2007 |
| J'ai fui l'Allemagne nazie: Journal d'Ilse | I Fled Nazi Germany | | 1938-1939 | Yaël Hassan | 2007 |
| A l'aube de la révolution russe: Journal de Liouba | At the Dawn of the Russian Revolution | | 1916-1917 | Anne-Marie Pol | 2007 |
| Au temps des martyrs chrétiens: Journal d'Alba | At the time of Christian Martyrs | | 175-178 après J.-C. | Paule du Bouchet | 2007 |
| Sissi: Journal d'Elisabeth, future impératrice d'Autriche | Sissi: The Journal of Elisabeth, Future Empress of Austria | | 1853-1855 | Catherine de Lasa | 2008 |
| Au temps de François Ier: Journal d'Anne de Cormes | At the Time of Francis I | | 1515-1516 | Brigitte Coppin | 2008 |
| A l'aube du XXe siècle: Journal de Flora Bonnington | The Dawn of the 20th Century | | 1899-1900 | Carol Drinkwater and Julie Lafon | 2008 |
| A la cour de Louis XIV: Journal d'Angélique de Barjac | At the Court of Louis XIV | | 1684-1685 | Dominique Joly | 2008 |
| Catherine de Médicis: Journal d'une princesse italienne | Catherine de' Medici: A Journal of an Italian Princess | | 1530-1533 | Catherine de Lasa | 2009 |
| Isabelle de Castille: Journal d'une princesse espagnole | Isabel of Castile: A Journal of a Spanish Princess | | 1466-1469 | Carolyn Meyer and Bee Formentelli | 2009 |
| Constance, fiancée de Mozart: Vienne | Constance, the Fiancée of Mozart | | 1781-1783 | Isabelle Duquesnoy | 2009 |
| Les cendres de Pompéi: Journal de Briséis | Ashes of Pompeii | | an 79 | Christine Féret-Fleur | 2010 |
| Yves, captif des pirates | Yves, a Captive of Pirates | Avril-Août | 1718 | Dominique Joly | 2010 |
| Du côté des impressionnistes: Journal de Pauline | Side of the Impressionists | | 1873-1874 | Clara Bourreau | 2010 |
| Martin, apprenti de Gutenberg: Carnet de voyage d'un imprimeur | Martin, an Apprentice of Gutenberg: The Travels of a Printer | | 1467-1468 | Sophie Humann | 2010 |
| Li Mei : Suivante dans la Cité Interdite | Li Mei: Next in the Forbidden City | The Forbidden City, China | 1692-1693 | Isabelle Duquesnoy | 2011 |
| Guillaume, fils de chef viking : Chronique Normande | William, son of the Viking chief: Norman Chronicle | | 911-912 | Sigrid Renaud | 2011 |
| Anne de Bretagne: Duchesse insoumise | Anne of Brittany: Rebellious Duchess | | 1488-1491 | Catherine de Lasa | 2011 |
| Minémès, explorateur pour Pharaon: Récit d'une expédition | Minemes, Explorer for the Pharaoh: Story of an Expedition | | 1472 BC | Viviane Koenig | 2011 |
| Au temps des crinolines: Journal de Charlotte | At the Time of the Crinolines | | 1855 | Jean-Côme Noguès | 2012 |
| La chanteuse de Vivaldi: Journal de Lucrezia | The Singer of Vivaldi | | 1720 | Christine Féret-Fleury | 2012 |
| Infirmière pendant la Première Guerre mondiale: Journal de Genevière Darfeuil | Nurse During World War I | | 1914-1918 | Sophie Humann | 2012 |
| Anne, fiancée de Louis XIII: Journal d'une future reine de France | Anne, Fiancée of Louis XIII: Diary of a Future Queen of France | | 1615-1617 | Isabelle Duquesnoy | 2012 |
| Au temps du théâtre grec: Journal de Cléo | At the Time of Greek Theatre | | 468 BC | Viviane Koenig | 2013 |
| Mon rêve d'Amérique: Journal de Reïzel | My Dream of America | | 1914-1915 | Yaël Hassan | 2013 |
| Blanche de Castille: Future reine de France | Blanche of Castile: Future Queen of France | | 1199-1200 | Catherine de Lasa | 2013 |
| Léon, sur le chantier de la Tour Eiffel: Journal d'un ouvrier | Leon, on the Site of the Eiffel Tower: Diary of a Worker | | 1888-1889 | Dominique Joly | 2014 |
| Apprentie Geisha: Journal d'Ayami | Geisha Apprentice | | 1923 | Isabelle Duquesnoy | 2014 |
| Comédienne de Molière: Journal d'Armande | Molière's Actress | | 1658-1661 | Christine Féret-Fleury | 2015 |
| Marco Polo, la grande aventure: Journal de la Route de la Soie | Marco Polo, the Great Adventure: Diary of the Silk Road | | 1269-1275 | Viviane Koenig | 2016 |
| Marie, fiancée de Louis XV: Journal d'une future reine de France | Marie, fiancée of Louis XV: Diary of a Future Queen of France | | 1724-1725 | Sophie Humann | 2017 |
| J'ai aimé le Roi-Soleil: Journal de Marie Mancini | I Loved the Sun King: Diary of Marie Mancini | | 1656-1659 | Christine Féret-Fleury | 2018 |
| Dans la révolte des canuts: Journal de Pauline | During the Canuts Revolts | | 1831-1832 | Catherine de Lasa | 2019 |
| Berlin, 1989: un mur s'écroule: Journal d'Anita | Berlin 1989: A Wall Collapses | | 1989 | Sophie Humann | 2019 |
| Julia, fille de César: Journal d'une jeune Romaine | Julia, Daughter of Caesar: Diary of a Young Roman | | 73-59 BC | Viviane Koenig | 2020 |
| Camille Claudel: Journal d'une apprentie sculptrice | Camille Claudel: Diary of a Sculptor's Apprentice | | 1877-1879 | Justine Duquesnoy | 2021 |
| Dans l'atelier de Coco Chanel: Journal d'Aimée Dubuc | Inside Coco Chanel's Studio | | 1914-1919 | Christine Féret-Fleury | 2022 |
| Peintre de Marie-Antoinette: Journal d'Élisabeth Vigée Le Brun | Painter of Marie-Antoinette: Diary of Élisabeth Vigée Le Brun | | 1766-1770 | Catherine de Lasa | 2022 |

== See also ==
- Dear America
- My Name Is America
- My America
- The Royal Diaries
- My Australian Story
- Dear Canada
- My Story (UK)
- My Story (New Zealand)
- My Royal Story
