= My America =

Children's novel

- Author: Mary Pope Osborne; Patricia Hermes; Kristiana Gregory; Kate McMullan:
- Country: United States
- Language: English
- Genre: Fiction
- Publisher: Scholastic Corporation

My America is a series of fictional diaries of children that take place during significant moments in American history. Created by Scholastic, it is a spin-off of the series, Dear America, geared toward younger children (ages 7–10). The series covers: Jamestown, the American Revolution, the American Civil War, Westward Expansion, Underground Railroad, and slavery. Each topic has three books and is authored by a different writer. Writers include well respected and popular children's authors, such as Mary Pope Osborne of Magic Tree House fame. The series was discontinued in 2004, but the books continue to be a popular teaching device for introducing American history to elementary school age children.

== Books ==
My America Series:

Elizabeth "Lizzy" Mary Barker's Jamestown Colony Diaries (1609) by Patricia Hermes:

(1) Our Strange New Land

(2) The Starving Time

(3) Season of Promise

Hope Penny Potter's Revolutionary War Diaries (1776) by Kristiana Gregory:

(1) Five Smooth Stones

(2) We Are Patriots

(3) When Freedom Comes

Joshua Martin McCullough's Oregon Trail Diaries (1848) by Patricia Hermes:

(1) Westward To Home

(2) A Perfect Place

(3) The Wild Year

Margaret "Meg" Cora Wells' Prairie Diaries (1856) by Kate McMullan:

(1) As Far As I Can See

(2) For This Land

(3) A Fine Start

Corey Birdsong's Underground Railroad Diaries (1857) by Sharon Dennis Wyeth:

(1) Freedom's Wings

(2) Flying Free

(3) Message In The Sky

Virginia "Ginny" B. Dickens' Civil War Diaries (1863) by Mary Pope Osborne & Will Osborne:

(1) My Brother's Keeper

(2) After The Rain

(3) A Time To Dance

Sofia Monari's Immigrant Diaries (1903) by Kathryn Lasky:

(1) Hope In My Heart

(2) Home At Last

(3) An American Spring

== See also ==
- Dear America
- My America
- My Name Is America
- The Royal Diaries
- My Australian Story
- Dear Canada
- My Story (UK)
- My Story (New Zealand)
- Mon Histoire (France) (non-Scholastic)
- I Am Canada
