= Dear America =

Children's historical fiction series

Dear America is a series of historical fiction novels for children published by Scholastic starting in 1996. By 1998, the series had 12 titles with 3.5 million copies in print. Each book is written in the form of a diary of a young woman's life during important events or time periods in American history, such as the establishment of Plymouth Colony, the Salem Witch Trials, slavery, the California gold rush, the Great Depression, the Triangle Shirtwaist Factory fire, the sinking of the RMS Titanic, and most major wars. Originally all the books had a ribbon inserted as a bookmark, furthering the concept of the book as a diary, but this was later discontinued.

Nine books in the series were adapted as half-hour television episodes for HBO in 1999 and 2000, followed by three volumes of the spin-off series The Royal Diaries.

== List of books ==
There are thirty-six books in the original Dear America series, which was published between 1996 and 2004.

The series was relaunched in September 2010 with its first new title since 2004, The Fences Between Us by Kirby Larson, as well as re-releases of earlier books. 2011 saw the publication of the first sequel in the series: Cannons at Dawn, a sequel to The Winter of Red Snow.

List of Dear America books
Date (original)	Date (reprint)	Author	Title
1996	September 2010	Kathryn Lasky	A Journey to the New World: The Diary of Remember Patience Whipple, Mayflower, 1620
1996	September 2010	Kristiana Gregory	The Winter of Red Snow: The Revolutionary War Diary of Abigail Jane Stewart, Valley Forge, Pennsylvania, 1777
1996	April 2011	Barry Denenberg	When Will This Cruel War Be Over? The Civil War Diary of Emma Simpson, Gordonsville, Virginia, 1864
1997	January 2011	Patricia McKissack	A Picture of Freedom: The Diary of Clotee, a Slave Girl, Belmont Plantation, Virginia, 1859
1997	April 2012	Kristiana Gregory	Across the Wide and Lonesome Prairie: The Oregon Trail Diary of Hattie Campbell, 1847
1997	—N/a	Barry Denenberg	So Far from Home: The Diary of Mary Driscoll, an Irish Mill Girl, Lowell, Massachusetts, 1847
1997	July 2011	Joyce Hansen	I Thought My Soul Would Rise and Fly: The Diary of Patsy, a Freed Girl, Mars Bluff, South Carolina, 1865
1998	—N/a	Jim Murphy	West to a Land of Plenty: The Diary of Teresa Angelino Viscardi, New York to Idaho Territory, 1883
1998	—N/a	Kathryn Lasky	Dreams in the Golden Country: The Diary of Zipporah Feldman, a Jewish Immigrant Girl, New York City, 1903
1998	May 2011	Mary Pope Osborne	Standing in the Light: The Captive Diary of Catherine Carey Logan, Delaware Valley, Pennsylvania, 1763
1998	November 2010	Ellen Emerson White	Voyage on the Great Titanic: The Diary of Margaret Ann Brady, RMS Titanic, 1912
1998	—N/a	Sherry Garland	A Line in the Sand: The Alamo Diary of Lucinda Lawrence, Gonzales, Texas, 1836
1999	—N/a	Ann Rinaldi	My Heart Is on the Ground: The Diary of Nannie Little Rose, a Sioux Girl, Carlisle Indian School, Pennsylvania, 1880
1999	—N/a	Kristiana Gregory	The Great Railroad Race: The Diary of Libby West, Utah Territory, 1868
1999	March 2011	Karen Hesse	A Light in the Storm: The Civil War Diary of Amelia Martin, Fenwick Island, Delaware, 1861
1999	—N/a	Ann Turner	The Girl Who Chased Away Sorrow: The Diary of Sarah Nita, a Navajo Girl, New Mexico, 1864
2000	—N/a	Susan Campbell Bartoletti	A Coal Miner's Bride: The Diary of Anetka Kaminska, Lattimer, Pennsylvania, 1896
2000	—N/a	Patricia McKissack	Color Me Dark: The Diary of Nellie Lee Love, The Great Migration North, Chicago, Illinois, 1919
2000	—N/a	Barry Denenberg	One Eye Laughing, the Other Weeping: The Diary of Julie Weiss, Vienna, Austria to New York, 1938
2000	—N/a	Mary Pope Osborne	My Secret War: The World War II Diary of Madeline Beck, Long Island, New York, 1941
2001	—N/a	Sherry Garland	Valley of the Moon: The Diary Of Maria Rosalia de Milagros, Sonoma Valley, Alta California, 1846
2001	—N/a	Kristiana Gregory	Seeds of Hope: The Gold Rush Diary of Susanna Fairchild, California Territory, 1849
2001	September 2012	Kathryn Lasky	Christmas After All: The Great Depression Diary of Minnie Swift, Indianapolis, Indiana, 1932
2001	—N/a	Barry Denenberg	Early Sunday Morning: The Pearl Harbor Diary of Amber Billows, Hawaii, 1941
2001	—N/a	Jim Murphy	My Face to the Wind: The Diary of Sarah Jane Price, a Prairie Teacher, Broken Bow, Nebraska, 1881
2002	—N/a	Ellen Emerson White	Where Have All the Flowers Gone? The Diary of Molly MacKenzie Flaherty, Boston, Massachusetts, 1968
2002	—N/a	Kathryn Lasky	A Time for Courage: The Suffragette Diary of Kathleen Bowen, Washington, D.C., 1917
2002	—N/a	Barry Denenberg	Mirror, Mirror on the Wall: The Diary of Bess Brennan, Perkins School for the Blind, 1932
2002	—N/a	Katelan Janke	Survival in the Storm: The Dust Bowl Diary of Grace Edwards, Dalhart, Texas, 1935
2002	—N/a	Beth Seidel Levine	When Christmas Comes Again: The World War I Diary of Simone Spencer, New York City to the Western Front, 1917
2002	—N/a	Marion Dane Bauer	Land of the Buffalo Bones: The Diary of Mary Ann Elizabeth Rodgers, an English Girl in Minnesota, New Yeovil, Minnesota, 1873
2003	—N/a	Ann Turner	Love Thy Neighbor: The Tory Diary of Prudence Emerson, Green Marsh, Massachusetts, 1774
2003	—N/a	Megan McDonald	All the Stars in the Sky: The Santa Fe Trail Diary of Florrie Mack Ryder, The Santa Fe Trail, 1848
2004	—N/a	Patricia McKissack	Look to the Hills: The Diary of Lozette Moreau, a French Slave Girl, New York Colony, 1763
2004	September 2011	Lisa Rowe Fraustino	I Walk in Dread: The Diary of Deliverance Trembley, Witness to the Salem Witch Trials, Massachusetts Bay Colony, 1691
2004	January 2014	Deborah Hopkinson	Hear My Sorrow: The Diary of Angela Denoto, a Shirtwaist Worker, New York City, 1909
September 2010	—N/a	Kirby Larson	The Fences Between Us: The Diary of Piper Davis, Seattle, Washington, 1941
January 2011	—N/a	Lois Lowry	Like the Willow Tree: The Diary of Lydia Amelia Pierce, Portland, Maine, 1918
May 2011	—N/a	Kristiana Gregory	Cannons at Dawn: The Second Diary of Abigail Jane Stewart, Valley Forge, Pennsylvania, 1779
September 2011	—N/a	Andrea Davis Pinkney	With the Might of Angels: The Diary of Dawnie Rae Johnson, Hadley, Virginia, 1954
January 2012	—N/a	Susan Patron	Behind the Masks: The Diary of Angeline Reddy, Bodie, California, 1880
March 2013	—N/a	Judy Blundell	A City Tossed and Broken: The Diary of Minnie Bonner, San Francisco, California, 1906
March 2013	—N/a	Susan Campbell Bartoletti	Down the Rabbit Hole: The Diary of Pringle Rose, Chicago, Illinois, 1871

== Spin-offs ==
Three similar series were also published by Scholastic:

- My Name is America, a series of fictional journals of young men during American history
- My America, a series of fictional diaries of young children during American history
- The Royal Diaries, a series of fictional journals about the teenage years of famous royal women throughout world history

In addition, several of Scholastic's international divisions have published series inspired by the Dear America series:

- Dear Canada and I Am Canada, published by Scholastic Canada
- My Story, published by Scholastic UK. This series republishes at least three of the Dear America books: A Journey to the New World (as Mayflower), A Picture of Freedom (as Slave Girl), and Voyage on the Great Titanic.
- My Australian Story, published by Scholastic Australia
- My New Zealand Story, published by Scholastic New Zealand
- Dear India and The Teenage Diary of..., published by Scholastic India

Similar series from other publishers include:

- Diarios Mexicanos, published by Planeta (Spain)
- Mon Histoire, published by Gallimard Jeunesse (France)
- Fy Hanes I, published by Gamer Press (Wales)

== Television adaptation ==
Half-hour dramatizations of nine books from the series aired on HBO between March 1999 and July 2000. They were also played on FX in the 2000s. As of November 2025, all nine episodes are available for streaming on Tubi and The Roku Channel, split into two "volumes" of six and three episodes.

=== Episodes ===
No.	Title	Directed by	Written by	Original release date
1	"A Picture of Freedom"	Helaine Head	Ron Stacker Thompson & Ashley Tyler	March 14, 1999
Main cast: Shadia Simmons as Clotee, Alison Sealy-Smith as Aunt Tee, Erica Luttrell as Spicy, Jason Burke as Hince, Richard Sali as Master Henley, Andrew Dinner as William, Catherine Fitch as Miz Lilly, Delores Etienne as Hannah
2	"Dreams in the Golden Country"	Shawn Levy	Jill Soffer	April 1, 1999
Main cast: Natalie Vansier as Zippy, Dov Tiefenbach as Yitzy, Heather Brown as Tovah, Joshua Peace as Sean, Paul Hecht as Papa, Maggie Huculak as Mama, Sarah Manninen as Helen
3	"A Journey to the New World"	Don McCutcheon	Eric Tuchman	May 6, 1999
Main cast: Alison Pill as Mem, Andrew Airlie as Father, Brenda Bazinet as Mother, Susannah Hoffmann as Hannah, Kennetch Charlette as Squanto, Donald Burda as Captain Standish, Cody Jones as John Billington, Sally Cahill as Mistress Billington, Alana Brascoupe as Noami, Chris Britton as Brewster
4	"Standing in the Light"	Stacey Stewart Curtis	Jill Soffer	September 12, 1999
Main cast: Stephanie Mills as Caty, Marc Donato as Thomas Logan, Grant Nickalls as Snow Hunter, Madeleine Bergeron as White Bird, C. David Johnson as Father, Jane Johanson as Mother, Jennifer Podemski as Bright Eyes, Jack Burning as Sachem
5	"So Far From Home"	Don McCutcheon	Carl Binder	October 2, 1999
6	"The Winter of Red Snow"	Don McCutcheon	Carl Binder	November 6, 1999
7	"Color Me Dark"	Helaine Head	Ann MacNaughton	February 7, 2000
8	"A Line in the Sand"	William Fruet	Heather Conkie	April 10, 2000
9	"When Will This Cruel War Be Over?"	William Fruet	Rhonda Olson	July 5, 2000
