= Standing in the Light (disambiguation) =

Standing in the Light may refer to:

- Standing in the Light: The Captive Diary of Catherine Carey Logan, a novel by Mary Pope Osborne
- Standing in the Light, an album and its title track by Level 42
- "Standing in the Light", a song by Gotthard from their self-titled debut album
