= Cyborg: The Second Book of the Clone Codes =

2011 novel by Fredrick McKissack

- First edition
- Authors: Patricia McKissack, Fredrick McKissack, John Patrick McKissack
- Cover artist: Ken Choi
- Language: English
- Subject: Children's literature, Science fiction
- Published: 2011 (Scholastic Press)
- Publication place: United States
- Media type: Print (hardback, paperback)
- Pages: 107
- ISBN: 9780439929851
- OCLC: 731183759

Cyborg: The Second Book of the Clone Codes is a 2011 book by Patricia and Fredrick McKissack. It is the second book in the Clone Codes trilogy and is about Houston Ye, a teen cyborg who, with Leanna (a girl who discovered she is a clone in the first book, The Clone Codes), attempt to obtain civil rights for themselves.

== Reception ==
A review in the School Library Journal wrote "It's a fast-paced book, sometimes too much so. There is little character development, and the plot takes sudden jumps that makes it difficult to follow." Other reviews were critical, with Library Media Connection writing "Way too much telling, not enough showing.", and Voice of Youth Advocates finding it "didactic and lackluster."

Cyborg has also been reviewed by Kirkus Reviews.
