= My Royal Story =

My Royal Story is a series for older children that are some re prints of the Royal Diaries and some of the girls My Story. They are written in diary forms of real and fictional characters in different parts of the world and in different time periods.

- Egyptian Princess, Egypt, 1490 BC by Vince Cross (2009)
- Cleopatra: An Egyptian Princess Diary, Egypt BC 57 by Kristiana Gregory (2010)
- Catherine of Aragon, London, 1501 by Alison Prince (2010)
- Anne Boleyn and Me:A Tudor Girl's Diary, London, 1525 by Alison Prince (2010)
- Elizabeth: A Tudor Princess Diary, England, 1544 by Kathryn Lasky (2010)
- Mary Queen of Scots: A Scottish Queen's Diary, France, 1553 by Kathryn Lasky (2010)
- Marie Antoinette: An Austrian Princess Diary, Vienna, 1769 by Kathryn Lasky (2010)
- Victoria: An English Princess' Diary, London, 1829 by Anna Kirwan (2010)
- Anastasia: A Russian Grand Duchess' Diary, Russia, 1914 by Carolyn Meyer (2010)
- Bloody Tower: A Tudor Girl's Diary, England, 1553-1559 by Valerie Wilding (2009)
- Henry VIII's Wives by Alison Prince (2011)
- Lady Jane Grey by Sue Reid (2012)
- Wartime Princess by Valerie Wilding (2012).
