= David Mulligan =

David Mulligan may refer to:

- Dave Mulligan (born 1982), New Zealand football player and coach
- David B. Mulligan (1869–1954), Canadian-born hotel executive
- David Mulligan, author of the young adult historical novel Heroes of Tobruk
