= Exodusters =

Movement of African Americans in Kansas to live freely from their former slave masters

Exoduster movement
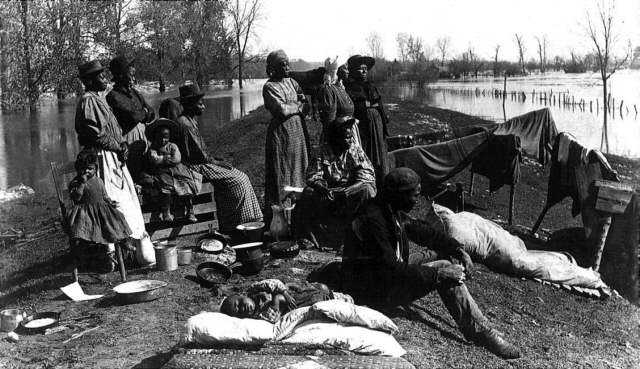
- Refugees on a levee in Mississippi, April 17, 1897
- Date: 1879
- Location: United States
- Also known as: Exodus of 1879
- Cause: Disenfranchisement after the Reconstruction Era; Jim Crow economy; Mass racial violence in the United States
- Participants: Government of the United States; African Americans
- Outcome: 98,000 sign emigration papers; Around 26,000 African Americans arrive in Kansas

Exodusters was a name given to African Americans who migrated from states along the Mississippi River to Kansas in the late 19th century, as part of the Exoduster Movement or Exodus of 1879. It was the first general migration of black people following the Civil War and end of Reconstruction.

The movement received substantial organizational support from prominent figures, such as Benjamin Singleton of Tennessee, Philip D. Armour of Chicago, and Henry Adams of Louisiana. As many as 40,000 Exodusters left the South to settle in Kansas, Oklahoma and Colorado.

== Background ==
The main cause of black migration out of the South during and following Reconstruction era was to escape racial violence or "bulldozing" by white supremacist groups such as the Ku Klux Klan and the White League, as well as widespread repression under the Black Codes—discriminatory laws that rendered blacks second-class citizens after Reconstruction ended. Vigilantes operated with impunity, and no other issue was of more importance to the majority of southern blacks living in the countryside. Given the level of discrimination and violent intimidation blacks faced in the rural South, some historians describe Exodusters as refugees.

Although blacks greatly outnumbered whites in Louisiana, black armed resistance was rare. According to William Murrell in testimony given to the United States Senate, "the white people in Louisiana are better armed and equipped now than during the war". As evidence of the lawlessness which empowered the terrorist activities of the White League in the mid-1870s, the League "managed to seize a huge cache of arms from the arsenal in New Orleans [...] worth about $67,000" stolen from the United States government.

Throughout Reconstruction a majority of the southern white population continued to resent black emancipation, resulting in an oppressive environment. Most black migration, including the Exodus of 1879, was spurred on by the dire economic prospects of black labor in the rural South. The depression of the 1870s served to exacerbate the racist policies of white merchants and planters, who sought to offset their agricultural losses by increasing prices and interest rates for blacks.

Most southern states undermined federal Reconstruction efforts to promote landowning as the blacks' ticket to economic freedom and equality. For example, in 1865 the Mississippi Black Code outlawed the selling or leasing of land to blacks. As a result, in large parts of Mississippi, less than 1 in 100 black workers owned land or a house.

In the aftermath of the Compromise of 1877 and the traumatic political campaigns of 1878 in Louisiana, the plight of organized black resistance had reached a point of hopelessness, leading to the Exodus of 1879. Political and economic oppression was enforced by means both legal and illegal, on the streets and in contracts, at both the local and federal levels. Grassroots black political activism, exemplified by the leadership of Henry Adams in Louisiana, functioned only in total secrecy and at great risk of assassination. Such efforts were eventually pushed out of rural communities and into New Orleans, where many organizers including Adams found themselves exiled.

=== Millenarianism ===
The movement has been characterized as an example of millenarianism, in that many Exodusters created settlements they believed to be their Promised Land. That the journey of these refugees was termed an "exodus", a word taken from the Old Testament in reference to the Jews' flight from Egypt, indicates that the movement had spiritual motivations. The millenarian aspect of the exodus was most realized in Tennessee, where Benjamin "Pap" Singleton's boisterous proselytizing mostly found an enthusiastic black following and a more amenable white audience.

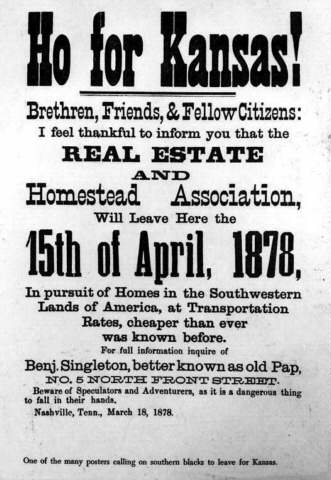
"Ho For Kansas!" Copyprint handbill

=== Role of black leadership ===
While the roles of community leaders like Singleton and Adams, white facilitators like Thomas W. Conway, formal politicians, and white philanthropists were in some ways crucial to the exodus, the migration ultimately came about as a result of the collective misery of black southerners and the individual inquiry and initiative taken in response by migrants. Black political leaders at the time, such as Adams and Singleton at the local level and Frederick Douglass and Mississippi Senator Blanche K. Bruce at the national level, were limited in their ability to influence the southern black populace. For this reason, during the post-Reconstruction period, blacks did not enjoy any truly representative national leadership.

== Promised lands ==
Before the Exodus of 1879 to Kansas, southern blacks convened to discuss the option of emigration both formally and informally. Delegates from Louisiana, Mississippi, Alabama, Texas, Arkansas, and Georgia met at a New Orleans conference in 1875 and discussed black emigration to western territories and to Liberia. Black settlement outside of the South as a result of emigration was termed "colonization", and the New Orleans committee meeting became a full-fledged organization dubbed "The Colonization Council". The council held its first public meetings in 1877. Council meetings consisted of speechmaking and petition writing and signing, with some 98,000 men, women, and children from Louisiana signed onto emigration lists.

Liberia proved an unrealistic destination for black refugees financially and logistically. As the land of John Brown, Kansas had fought bitterly for its free state status and took its fair treatment of black immigrants as a point of pride. Kansas did not actively encourage the Exodusters, but its equal-opportunity stance was more welcoming than most of the country.

The most successful of the Exodusters were those who moved to urban centers and found work as domestic or trade workers. Almost all who attempted to homestead in the countryside settled in the Kansas uplands, which presented the most formidable obstacles to small-scale farmers. The uplands were the only lands available for purchase after the squatters, railroads, and speculators had taken the best farmland. Given the agricultural challenge of farming these lands, many Exodusters were still destitute a year after their arrival.

== Response ==
The Exodus of 1879 consisted mostly of refugees fleeing Mississippi and Louisiana between March and May and Texas later in the year. There was considerable uncertainty at the time as to the actual number that arrived in St. Louis. However, the Colored Relief Board estimated that about 20,000 reached the city between 1879 and 1880; the St. Louis Globe-Democrat states 6,206 arrived between March and April 1879.

Many steamboat captains refused to carry migrants across the Missouri River, and thousands were stranded for months in St. Louis. Black churches in St. Louis, together with eastern philanthropists, formed the Colored Relief Board and the Kansas Freedmen's Aid Society to help those stranded in St. Louis reach Kansas. In contrast to fundraising success in Kansas, "St. Louis officials discouraged the Exodusters whenever possible", and therefore the burden of providing for stranded Exodusters fell on the St. Louis black community. Other private relief organizations were funded by Quakers and other abolitionists in northern states and England. The Kansas Freedman's Aid Society raised some $70,000, with $13,000 of coming from England.

The reluctance of federal and state governments to financially support black migrants can be attributed to both bureaucratic incompetence (as in the case of the mayor of Kansas being denied temporary assistance from the secretary of war due to congressional jurisdiction) and to 19th-century preferences for limited government. At the local level, Topeka Mayor Michael C. Case declined to spend municipal funds to aid Exodusters, believing that the money would be better spent to return them to the South. Moreover, much of the poor white population resented the extent of relief efforts aimed at helping immigrant blacks.

The political response of southern white Democrats, and of some conservative "representative" black men, was one of disgust and incomprehension. They distrusted the intentions of white philanthropy in aiding black migration; in fact, they were convinced of ulterior motives. They denied claims of economic hardship and political oppression as motivating factors for black flight. They attributed feelings of discontent to a small group of leading black rabble-rousers and outside white meddling. In solidarity, the Democratic Party as a whole "refused to admit to the fact of Southern lawlessness because many of the crimes had been perpetrated by Democrats, usually for their party's own advancement". In contrast the Senate minority opinion, represented in a report by Senators William Windom and Henry W. Blair, utilized the direct testimony of prominent black figures and sided with them. Ultimately, the Democratic majority in Congress ensured that no legislation would be passed in support of the Exodus Movement. Appropriation bills for refugee aid introduced by Kansas Senator John J. Ingalls and Ohio Representative James A. Garfield died in committee.

Senate investigations debated whether or not black migration fit into a greater conspiratorial political scheme on the part of Republicans, who were thought to be packing swing states to increase their chances of success in the upcoming 1880 presidential election, which Republicans did win. Such accusations, lobbed in particular at Conway and Kansas Governor John St. John, were only seriously considered at the end of 1879, when more attention was being given to the black migrants from North Carolina, who, unable to reach Kansas, were being redirected to Indiana.

The exodus was not universally praised by African Americans; indeed Douglass, a former slave who escaped captivity, was a critic of the movement. Douglass did not disagree with the Exodusters in principle, but he felt that the movement was ill-timed and poorly organized.

== Impact ==
Although the Exodus of 1879 saw a high volume of black migration during a shorter period of time, most of the black migration to Kansas occurred steadily throughout the decade. The black population of Kansas increased by some 26,000 people during the 1870s. Historian Nell Painter further asserts that "the sustained migration of some 9,500 Blacks from Tennessee and Kentucky to Kansas during the decade far exceeded the much publicized migration of 1879, which netted no more than about 4,000 people from Louisiana". During the 1870s and the decade that followed, blacks bought more than 20,000 acres (81 km^{2}) of land in Kansas. The only surviving Exoduster settlements established during the period is Nicodemus, Kansas, which was founded in 1877.

The impact of the Exoduster migration on subsequent white treatment of African Americans was mixed. On the one hand, the exodus did little to alleviate the national propensity for violence towards blacks. From the 1880s through the 1930s, the lynching of African Americans increased, and some 3,000 lynchings took place during that period nationwide. On the other hand, the Exoduster migration seems to have had some impact on labor relations between southern black farm workers and their white employers. Temporary benefits accorded to counties with the highest black labor scarcity included better price terms in leasing contracts and shrinking long-term contract commitments.

== Fictional accounts ==
- Gabriel's Story, by David Anthony Durham
- Justin and the Best Biscuits in the World, by Mildred Pitts Walker
- Why the Dark Man Cries, by Connie Fredricks
- Scraps of Time: Away, West 1879 by Patricia C. McKissack

== See also ==
- African American settlements in Western Canada
- Camp Nelson Heritage National Monument
- Freedmen's town
- Great Migration (African American)
- Nadir of American race relations
