= The All-I'll-Ever-Want Christmas Doll =

Book by Patricia McKissack

- First edition
- Author: Patricia McKissack
- Illustrator: Jerry Pinkney
- Language: English
- Genre: Children's literature, picture book
- Published: 2007 (Schwartz & Wade Books, an imprint of Random House)
- Publication place: United States
- Media type: Print (hardback, paperback)
- Pages: 40 (unpaginated)
- ISBN: 9780375837593
- OCLC: 838317346

The All-I'll-Ever-Want Christmas Doll is a 2007 picture book by Patricia McKissack, illustrated by Jerry Pinkney. It is about a girl, Nella, living during the Great Depression, who receives a doll for Christmas. Initially, she doesn't share it with her sisters but later relents after discovering that it's not fun to play by herself.

== Reception ==
School Library Journal, in a review of The All-I'll-Ever-Want Christmas Doll, wrote: "McKissack's knack for combining historical detail with true-to-life family drama and language is shown to good effect, showcased beautifully by Pinkney's evocative watercolors, which give a real flavor of the time period. Learning to appreciate what you have and to share what you get are two lessons that never go out of style". Library Media Connection called it "a memorable book".

Booklist, Publishers Weekly and Kirkus Reviews gave starred reviews and commended Pinkey's illustrations.

The All-I'll-Ever-Want Christmas Doll has also been reviewed by The Horn Book Magazine, and The New York Times.

== Awards ==
- 2008 ALA Notable Children's Book
- 2008 CCBC Choice
- 2008 Charlotte Zolotow Award - highly commended
- NCTE Picturebooks With Noteworthy Endpapers - recommended
