= Goin' Someplace Special =

2001 children's book by Patricia McKissack

- Author: Pat Mckissack
- Illustrator: Jerry Pinkney
- Language: English
- Genre: Children's literature, picture book
- Published: 2001 (Atheneum Books for Young Readers)
- Publication place: United States
- Media type: Print (hardback)
- Pages: 32 (unpaginated)
- ISBN: 9780689818851
- OCLC: 43050147

Goin' Someplace Special is a 2001 children's book by Pat McKissack and illustrated by Jerry Pinkney. It is about a young African American girl, Tricia Ann, who goes to the public library by herself during the time of the Jim Crow laws.

== Reception ==
Common Sense Media, in a review of Goin' Someplace Special, wrote "The text and artwork here works beautifully together to tell a straightforward story with emotional depth and a strong message."

School Library Journal called it "A thought-provoking story for group sharing and independent readers." The Horn Book Magazine wrote "McKissack and Pinkney strike just the right balance in a picture book for young readers and listeners: informative without being preachy; hopeful without being sentimental."

Goin' Someplace Special has also been reviewed by Booklist, BookPage, Publishers Weekly, Teaching Librarian, Black Issues Book Review, and Library Talk.

It has also been used for studying children's literature.

== Awards ==
- 2002 Coretta Scott King Award illustrator - winner
- 2002 ALA Notable Children's Book - Younger Readers
- 2003-04 Texas Bluebonnet Award - nominated
