= To Establish Justice =

2004 book by Patricia McKissack and Arlene Zarembka

To Establish Justice: Citizenship and Constitution
- Authors: Patricia McKissack, Arlene Zarembka
- Language: English
- Subject: Young adult non-fiction, American history, Discrimination, Law, Civil rights
- Published: 2004 (Alfred A. Knopf)
- Publication place: United States
- Media type: Print (hardback, paperback)
- Pages: 154
- ISBN: 9780679893080
- OCLC: 760064870

To Establish Justice: Citizenship and Constitution is a 2004 book by Patricia McKissack and Arlene Zarembka. It is a history of the U.S. Supreme Court's role in civil rights.

== Reception ==
A review of To Establish Justice by Kirkus Reviews wrote "the authors present a compelling mix of analyses and quoted passages from judicial opinions to demonstrate that the Constitution and the Court are both flexible entities, sometimes ahead of the curve of change, sometimes behind." and concluded "this will give serious students of this country’s legal foundations plenty of food for thought."

To Establish Justice has also been reviewed by Illinois Reading Council Journal, the School Library Journal, Library Media Connection, Booklist, and Black Issues Book Review.

It is an American Library Association Lincoln: The Constitution and the Civil War Site Support Notebook Book for Younger Readers.
