= Sojourner Truth (biography) =

Biography for children (1992)

Sojourner Truth: Ain't I a Woman?
- First edition
- Author: Patricia McKissack, Frederick McKissack
- Language: English
- Genre: Children's biography
- Published: 1992 (Scholastic)
- Publication place: United States
- Media type: Print (hardback)
- Pages: 186
- ISBN: 9780590446914
- OCLC: 967852524

Sojourner Truth: Ain't I a Woman? is a 1992 children's biography by Patricia and Frederick McKissack. It tells the story of African-American abolitionist and women's rights activist, Sojourner Truth.

== Reception ==
The School Library Journal, in a review of Sojourner Truth wrote "With compassion and historical detail, the McKissacks offer a rich profile of Isabella Van Wagener. .. the McKissacks emphasize the condition of African-Americans from 1797-1883, their subject's convictions and magnetism, her contributions to the welfare of her people, and her involvement with other influential abolitionists and activists during the last 40 years of her life."

Sojourner Truth has also been reviewed by Booklist, Kirkus Reviews, and Publishers Weekly.

== Awards ==
- 1992 CCBC Choice
- 1993 Boston Globe–Horn Nonfiction Book Award – winner
- 1993 Coretta Scott King Book Author Award – honor
