= Tippy Lemmey =

Book by Patricia McKissack

- Author: Patricia McKissack
- Illustrator: Susan Keeter
- Language: English
- Subject: Children's literature, Chapter book
- Published: 2003 (Aladdin Paperbacks)
- Publication place: United States
- Media type: Print (paperback)
- Pages: 59
- ISBN: 9780689850196
- OCLC: 51205809

Tippy Lemmey is a 2003 chapter book by Patricia McKissack about three children, Leandra, Paul, and Jeannie, who are terrorised by a neighborhood dog, called Tippy Lemmey, but manage to overcome their fears and befriend him.

== Reception ==
A review of Tippy Lemmey by the School Library Journal wrote "This charming and humorous story moves along at a fast pace, making it perfect for readers just venturing into chapter-book territory. Evocative black-and-white illustrations effectively portray the children's changing perceptions of Tippy Lemmey. A delightful addition to any collection." and Booklist called it a "pleasing Ready-for-Chapters book that will appeal to fans of both animal stories and realistic fiction."

The Horn Book Magazine wrote "This is a terrific read-aloud, but why bother? Get Tippy Lemmey into one kid's hands and it will be the pass-it-on hit of the summer reading club."

Tippy Lemmey has also been reviewed by Kirkus Reviews.

It was a 2005 Texas Bluebonnet Award nominee.
