= Nzingha: Warrior Queen of Matamba, Angola, Africa, 1595 =

Book by Patricia McKissack

- Author: Patricia McKissack
- Language: English
- Genre: Children's literature, Biography, African history
- Published: 2000 (Scholastic)
- Publication place: USA
- Media type: Print (hardback, paperback)
- Pages: 136
- ISBN: 9780439112109
- OCLC: 43757459

Nzingha: Warrior Queen of Matamba, Angola, Africa, 1595 is a 2000 book by Patricia McKissack about Queen Anna Nzinga as a girl told through fictitious diary entries based on real historical events. It is part of the book series The Royal Diaries.

== Reception ==
Although found to have "an awkward, confusing narrative", Nzingha: Warrior Queen of Matamba, has also been described as "a good addition to the [Royal Diaries] series", and a "remarkable book".

It is a 2001 Notable Social Studies Trade Book for Young People
