= Lisa Rowe Fraustino =

American writer

Lisa Rowe Fraustino is an American writer and editor of children's literature.

== Biography ==
In 1961 Lisa was born in Dover-Foxcroft, Maine. She currently lives with her husband in Connecticut where she teaches at Eastern Connecticut State University.

== Education ==
Lisa has a Ph.D. from Binghamton University.

== Career ==
A professor of English at Eastern Connecticut State University, Lisa is also a visiting associate professor at the Hollins University Graduate Program in Children's Literature. In 2006 Lisa was the recipient of the Fulbright Scholarship with which she journeyed to Thailand in order to teach and consult in children's literature at Mahasarakham University.

== Scholarships ==
Lisa was awarded a Fulbright Scholarship in 2006. She chronicled her experiences teaching and traveling through Thailand at her wikispace.

== Books ==
=== Picture books ===
- The Hickory Chair (an ALA Notable Book)

=== Novels ===
- The Hole in the Wall (Milkweed Prize for Children's Literature)
- Ash: A Novel (an ALA Best Book for Young Adults)
- I Walk in Dread: the Diary of Deliverance Trembly, Witness to the Salem Witch Trials (Dear America series)
- Grass and Sky

=== Anthologies ===
- Don't Cramp My Style: Stories About That Time of the Month
- Dirty Laundry
- Mothers in Children’s and Young Adult Literature: From the Eighteenth Century to Postfeminsim
- Soul Searching: Thirteen Stories About Faith and Belief

=== Poetry ===
- Hitching to Istanbul
