= Ol' Clip-Clop =

Book by Patricia McKissack

Ol' Clip-Clop: A Ghost Story
- Author: Patricia McKissack
- Illustrator: Eric Velásquez
- Language: English
- Subject: Children's literature, American history,
- Published: 2013 (Holiday House)
- Publication place: United States
- Media type: Print (hardback, paperback)
- Pages: 32
- ISBN: 9780823422654
- OCLC: 868394482

Ol' Clip-Clop: A Ghost Story is a 2013 children's picture book written by Patricia McKissack and illustrated by Eric Velásquez. It is about John Leep, a stingy landlord, who cheats a tenant but then gets his come-uppance.

== Reception ==
Booklist, reviewing Ol' Clip-Clop, wrote "The expert pacing, attention-grabbing sound effects make this a winner, not to mention an ending featuring the kind of quick revelation that will have your whole audience of kids screaming and your storyteller laughing. .. The extreme darkness in many of the scenes, though adding to the creepiness, might present some challenges for large groups, so plan your (spooky) lighting accordingly." and the School Library Journal recommended it "for storytellers who want to actively engage their audiences."

The Horn Book Magazine found "The dark, muted shades of Velasquez’s oil paintings enhance the hair-raising text."

Ol' Clip-Clop has also been reviewed by Library Media Connection, Kirkus Reviews, and Publishers Weekly,

== Awards ==
- 2014 Bank Street CBC Best Children's Book of the Year (Five to Nine) - Outstanding Merit
- 2014-2015 Georgia Children's Book Award: Picturebook - winner
- 2015 Anne Izard Storytellers' Choice Award - winner
