= The Dark-Thirty =

1992 children's novel by Patricia McKissack

The Dark-Thirty Southern Tales of the Supernatural
- First edition
- Author: Patricia McKissack
- Illustrator: Brian Pinkney
- Language: English
- Genre: Young Adult Fiction Short Stories Anthology
- Publisher: Alfred A. Knopf
- Publication date: 1992
- Publication place: United States
- Media type: Print
- Pages: 166
- Awards: 1993 Coretta Scott King Author Award; Newbery Honor
- ISBN: 0-679-89006-8

The Dark-Thirty: Southern Tales of the Supernatural, is a children's thriller book, filled with ten tales of supernatural activity occurring throughout times of slavery and civil rights in the south. The authors of the book, Patricia McKissack and Fredrick McKissack, husband and wife, are known for their writings about African American culture. The illustrator of this book is Brian Pinkney, who has illustrated many highly acclaimed children's picture books. The Dark Thirty: Southern Tales of the Supernatural was published in 1992 and received a Newbery Honor along with a Coretta Scott King Award in 1993.

== Plot summaries ==
The Legend of Pin Oak tells the story of Henri, a free biracial man married to an enslaved woman. When his white half-brother, Harper, sells Henri’s wife and child, the family flees and has to make a life or death decision.

We Organized is about a slave who was freed before Abraham Lincoln signed the Emancipation Proclamation. His narrative describes voodoo rituals performed by slaves against their master.

Justice: Riley Holt, the richest man in Tallahatchie, Mississippi, is murdered. White garage owner Hoop Granger blames black veterinary student Alvin Tinsley for the crime, and gathers a group of his fellow Klansmen to lynch Alvin. After Alvin's murder, Hoop is haunted when the true story of Riley Holt's death refuses to disappear from his windows.

The 11:59: Lester Simmons, an old Pullman car porter, tells about the train called the 11:59. No porter hears the whistle of the 11:59 and lives. One night Lester hears the whistle of the 11:59 and tries to escape.

The Sight: Esau is born with a veil and according to the midwife has a gift called the sight, which could be blessing or a curse. Esau sees future visions and succeeds at controlling the visions, but is forced to use his ability for evil when his father Tall comes back.

The Woman in the Snow: Grady Bishop, a white bus driver, is assigned the route nicknamed the "Blackbird Express". On a snowy night, Grady sees a young black woman, Eula Mae Daniels, with a baby struggling to get through the snow. Grady refuses to allow her on the bus because she has no fare, and Eula Mae and her baby freeze to death. Their ghosts haunt the bus line until a black driver sets them free years later.

The Conjure Brother is about Josie, who badly wanted a little brother. In hopes that her mom would get pregnant, by eating a lot of food, but her mother stayed skinny and barely ate. Josie asks the town's conjure woman if she could help her. Upon granting Josie's wish, the conjure woman gave her precise directions to follow. Josie did not follow the directions and ends up with a big brother.

Boo Mama: A toddler named Nealy disappears from outside his house. After a year Nealy is found on church steps and seems in good condition, but has developed an unknown language, perplexing Leddy, his mother. As time passes, Leddy realizes that a supernatural creature took care of Nealy during his disappearance.

The Gingi is about Laura who bought a beautiful artifact, but was warned by Mrs. Aswadi that it might be evil. Mrs. Aswadi gave her a gift that would later be used to protect them from the evil of the Dabobo woman.

The Chicken-Coop Monster is about Missy, who stays with her grandparents and is sure there is a monster in the chicken coop. As President of the Monster Watchers of America, she uses her monster rules to steer clear of the Chicken Coop Monster.

== Characters ==
The Legend of Pin Oak

- Harper McAvoy - Slave master and white son of Amos McAvoy and Alva Dean
- Henri McAvoy - Mulatto son of Amos McAvoy and Mary DuPriest
- Charlemae - Wife of Henri

We Organized

- Massa, slave master
- Ajax, slave freed by Massa

Justice

- Riley Holt, richest white man in Tallahatchie, Mississippi
- Hoop Granger, white man who accused Alvin of committing crimes
- Chief Baker, Mississippi police officer and investigator for the Holt case
- Alvin Tinsley, black man blamed by Hoop Granger for the killing of Riley Holt

The 11:59

- Lester Simmons, a Pullman car porter

The Sight

- Amanda Mayes, Esau's mother
- Esau Mayes, Amanda and Tall Mayes's son and born with the gift to predict the future
- Tall Mayes, Esau's father
- Charity Rose, Esau's wife

The Woman in the Snow

- Grady Bishop, white bus driver of the Hall Street Express aka the Blackbird Express
- Eula Mae Daniels, young black mother who pleads for a ride to get her baby to the hospital and ghost of the Hall Street Express Route
- Ray Hammond, black bus driver who sets Eula Mae Daniels free

The Conjure Brother

- Josie, Hudson family's daughter
- JoBeth, Josie's friend
- Arthur Lee, Josie's friend
- Madam Zinnia, the conjure woman
- Adam, Josie's older brother

Boo Mama

- Leddy, activist who moved to Orchard City, Tennessee with her son
- Nealy, Leddy's son who went missing
- Germaine, Leddy's friend
- Sylvia, Leddy's friend
- Boo Mama, human like bear creature named Noss and saved Nealy's life
- Sheriff Martin, Orchard City sheriff

The Gingi

- Laura Bates, mother who bought the ebony sculpture
- Lizzie, Laura's daughter and released the gingi's powers
- Mrs. Aswadi, Ghanaian woman who sold the ebony sculpture to Laura
- Jack, Laura's husband
- Thomas Lester, Laura's son
- August, family cat
- The Dabobo Woman, evil witch disguised in the ebony sculpture

The Chicken-Coop Monster

- Missy, Franky and James Leon Russell's granddaughter and president of the Monster Watchers of America
- Franky Russell, Missy's grandmother
- James Leon Russell, Missy's grandfather
- Jay, Missy's friend and fellow member of the MWA

== Themes ==
- Slavery
- Underground Railroad
- Abolition
- Magic and Supernatural
- Civil Rights Movement
- African American

== Awards ==
- Newbery Medal Honor Book
- Coretta Scott King Award winner
- ALA Notable Children's Book
- NCSS-CBC Notable Children's Trade Book in the Field of Social Studies
- IRA Teacher's Choice
