= Where Crocodiles Have Wings =

2005 picture book by Patricia McKissack

Where Crocodiles have Wings
- Author: Patricia McKissack
- Illustrator: Bob Barner
- Language: English
- Genre: Children's picture book, Poetry
- Published: 2005 (Holiday House)
- Publication place: United States
- Media type: Print (hardback)
- Pages: 32 (unpaginated)
- ISBN: 9780823417483
- OCLC: 54425429

Where Crocodiles have Wings is a 2005 children's picture book by Patricia McKissack and illustrated by Bob Barner. It is a rhyming story where imaginative animals occur.

== Reception ==
Criticism of Where Crocodiles Have Wings came from the School Library Journal that wrote "Unfortunately, the world that this book depicts is one in which bouncy rhyme schemes are picked up and inexplicably dropped in the space of a single page, and in which meter is halting, jolting, and inconsistent. Also, some of the busy, cut-paper collage illustrations do not depict what is described in the text. Stick with McKissack's more successful titles, such as Precious and the Boo Hag (S & S, 2005), and skip this offering. " Booklist also found the book a lower standard, writing "The nighttime adventure is less a story than a string of imaginative flights of fancy .. This is a far cry from McKissack's top-notch books reflecting ethnic culture; it's a mishmash of creatures with incongruous traits, fanciful but fairly frivolous."

Where Crocodiles have Wings has also been reviewed by Kirkus Reviews, and Publishers Weekly, and The Horn Book Magazine,
