= Hard Labor (book) =

2004 book by Patricia and Fredrick McKissack

Hard Labor: The First African Americans, 1619
- Author: Patricia McKissack, Fredrick McKissack
- Illustrator: Joseph Daniel Fiedler
- Language: English
- Subject: Children's literature, United States history, African-American history
- Published: 2004 (Aladdin Paperbacks)
- Publication place: United States
- Media type: Print paperback)
- Pages: 68
- ISBN: 9780689861499
- OCLC: 824278600

Hard Labor: The First African Americans, 1619 is a 2004 book by Patricia and Fredrick McKissack about the first African Americans to set foot in America.

== Reception ==
Booklist, reviewing Hard Labor, wrote "The McKissacks take on a difficult and disturbing subject in this small history in the Milestone Books series, an account of the very first Africans who came to this country in the early seventeenth century .. The type is big and clear, with occasional black-and-white illustrations, but middle-graders will need adult help with the sweeping history, which includes an overview of slavery around the world." and the School Library Journal, although noting " The research is not supported by a bibliography or source notes, and the lack of a table of contents and index makes it difficult for students to find specific facts." concluded "Barring these shortcomings, this well-written offering will stimulate interest and spark discussions."

The Horn Book Magazine found "Hard Labor benefits from a timeline and list of websites but covers too many topics, which results in a confusing narrative." and Kirkus Reviews was more critical, writing "The McKissacks tell the story of the first African-Americans in America in an addition to the Milestone Books series. Unfortunately, they take a straightforward story and make it confusing. .. There are many stories in this volume that would make interesting history for the young reader; too bad they are sloppily combined into one choppy offering."

The ALAN Review lists Hard Labor as a Recommended Young Adult Nonfiction book for United States labor history.
