= The Royal Kingdoms of Ghana, Mali, and Songhay =

1993 Book about medieval West African history

The Royal Kingdoms of Ghana, Mali, and Songhay: Life in Medieval Africa
- First edition
- Authors: Patricia McKissack, Fredrick McKissack
- Language: English
- Subject: Children's literature, Picture book, Poetry
- Published: 1993 (Holt)
- Publication place: United States
- Media type: Print (hardback, paperback)
- Pages: 142
- ISBN: 9780805016703
- OCLC: 320539561

The Royal Kingdoms of Ghana, Mali, and Songhay: Life in Medieval Africa is a 1993 book by Patricia and Fredrick McKissack. It is a history of Western Africa and the kingdoms that flourished there from 700AD to 1700AD.

== Reception ==
School Library Journal in its review of The Royal Kingdoms of Ghana, Mali, and Songhay wrote that while "The authors have attempted something unique", they found shortcomings with the extensive use of oral history as it "prevents the line between history and mythology from being clearly drawn." The review concluded "In spite of its limitations, this title will be an important addition to most collections." Booklist commended its coverage of slavery issues; they described it as "not easy reading" and not "the best of the McKissacks' work."

A Publishers Weekly review wrote "Because much of the available information about medieval Africa is sketchy at best, the narrative is sometimes confusing, especially when the authors combine divergent theories or rely on myth and legend to fill holes in the historical record. Still, their volume contains insightful information about an important period in both African and world history."

== Awards ==
- 1994 Africana Older Children Book Award - Honor
- 1994 CCBC Choice
- 1997 NCTE Kaleidoscope book.
