= Yax Ahau Xoc =

Lady Yax Ahau Xoc
- Ajaw

Queen consort of Tikal
- Tenure: c.742-755
- Born: Palenque
- Died: After 755; Tikal
- Spouse: Yikʼin Chan Kʼawiil
- Issue: 28th Ruler; Yax Nuun Ahiin II
- Father: Kʼinich Ahkal Moʼ Nahb III, King of Palenque
- Mother: Lady Men Nik
- Religion: Maya religion

Yax Ahau Xoc (8th-century) was a Mayan Queen of Tikal and the wife of Yik'in Chan K'awiil. Her personal name is unknown; in official writings, her son Yax Pasaj Chan Yopat identified her by the name and title Yax Ahau Xoc ("A Noble Young Reader" or "The Young Lord's Counter"). She was also historically known as Chac Nik Ye ("Lady of Palenque"), from the family of Pacal the Great.

== Life ==
Yax Ahau Xoc was a princess of Lakamha, and the daughter of Lord K'inich Hanaab Pacal II. Her only known sibling was her brother, K'uk Balaam ("Quetzal Jaguar"), who was Lord of Lakamha after his father. The name and origin of her mother is unknown.

In her early teens, she married Lord Yik'in Chan K'awlil and bore him a son, Yax Pasaj Chan Yopat. Her husband died in 762 AD after thirteen years of marriage and her young son was crowned Lord of Tikal. By the end of his reign, tension between the upper and lower classes as well as inbreeding among the small number of noble families led to the loss of the Lords' influence over the common people. Shortly after, in the middle of the ninth century, the Classic Mayan cities collapsed due to deforestation, soil depletion, drought, over-hunting, and overpopulation.

== Cultural depictions ==
A fictional portrayal of Yax Ahau Xoc is found in the young adult novel in the form of a diary, Lady of Palenque: Flower of Bacal by Anna Kirwan. In the novel, the author gives Yax Ahau Xoc the fictional personal name Shana'Kin Yaxchel Pacal ("Green Jay on the Wall"). The book presents an account of the Lady's early days in Lakamha (modern-day Palenque) when she is thirteen years old, and her subsequent journey to Xukpi after she is engaged to Yik'in Chan K'awlil (Fire Keeper Serpent of Holy Lineages), who was twenty years her senior. The epilogue states that a year after their marriage, they had a son, Yax Pasaj Chan Yopat (New Dawn Sky Anther). The Lady's husband, Lord Fire Keeper, died at age 46 after thirteen years of marriage and left his kingdom to his 12-year-old son. It is suggested that the Lady may have married again and had another son after her husband's death.
