= Flossie & the Fox =

Book by Patricia McKissack

- First edition
- Author: Pat McKissack
- Illustrator: Rachel Isadora
- Language: English
- Genre: Children's literature, picture book, Trickster tale
- Published: 1986 (Dial Books for Young Readers)
- Publication place: USA
- Media type: Print (hardback)
- Pages: 32 (unpaginated)
- ISBN: 9780803702516
- OCLC: 13092593

Flossie & the Fox is a 1986 picture book by Patricia C. McKissack about a girl, Flossie, who takes some eggs to a neighbor, meets a fox on the way and manages to outwit it. In 1991, a film adaptation of the book was made with the author narrating.

== Reception ==
Kirkus Reviews, in a starred review of Flossie & the Fox, wrote "Isadora's watercolor, ink and pencil illustrations fully realize the spirit of the text, with Flossie's sturdy, self-reliant stance and the fox growing progressively more tentative and defensive. Mellow green, lemon, rust and earth tones fill a safe, sun-dappled world." The review called it "A perfect picture book." School Library Journal wrote "The language is true, and the illustrations are marvelously complementary in their interpretation of the events. This spirited little girl will capture readers from the beginning, and they'll adore her by the end of this delightful story."

Flossie & the Fox has also been reviewed by Booklist, and Publishers Weekly.

It is a 1986 Horn Book Fanfare Book,

== Analysis ==
In discussing literary innovations in diverse children's literature, scholar Jonda C. McNair explores how the dialogue present in Patricia C. McKissack'a Flossie & the Fox portrays African American English Vernacular in a positive light. This link discusses its use of a clever character that is able to outsmart the fox who speaks standard English.

== See also ==
- Little Red Riding Hood
