= Red-Tail Angels: The Story of the Tuskegee Airmen of World War II =

1995 children's book by Patricia McKissack

Red-Tail Angels: The Sory of the Tuskegee Airmen of World War II
- Author: Patricia McKissack, Frederick McKissack
- Illustrator: Dena Schutzer
- Language: English
- Subject: Children's non-fiction book, African American Military history
- Published: 1995 (Walker and Co.)
- Publication place: United States
- Media type: Print (hardback)
- Pages: 136
- ISBN: 9780802782922
- OCLC: 32429004

Red-Tail Angels: The Story of the Tuskegee Airmen of World War II is a 1995 Children's picture book by Patricia and Frederick McKissack. It is about the African Americans of the 332nd Fighter Group and the 477th Bombardment Group of the USAF who were known as the Tuskegee Airmen.

== Reception ==
A Horn Book Magazine review wrote "Here is a piece of history that needed to be told, and the McKissacks have told it superbly." and " Impeccably documented, handsomely designed, thoughtfully executed, this book by two of our most committed and talented writers gives these pioneers' accomplishments meaning for a new generation." The School Library Journal called it a "well-crafted, thoroughly researched account" and recommended it as "A lively, compelling addition to any collection."

Red-Tail Angels has also been reviewed by Kirkus Reviews, Booklist, Publishers Weekly, and the American Book Review.

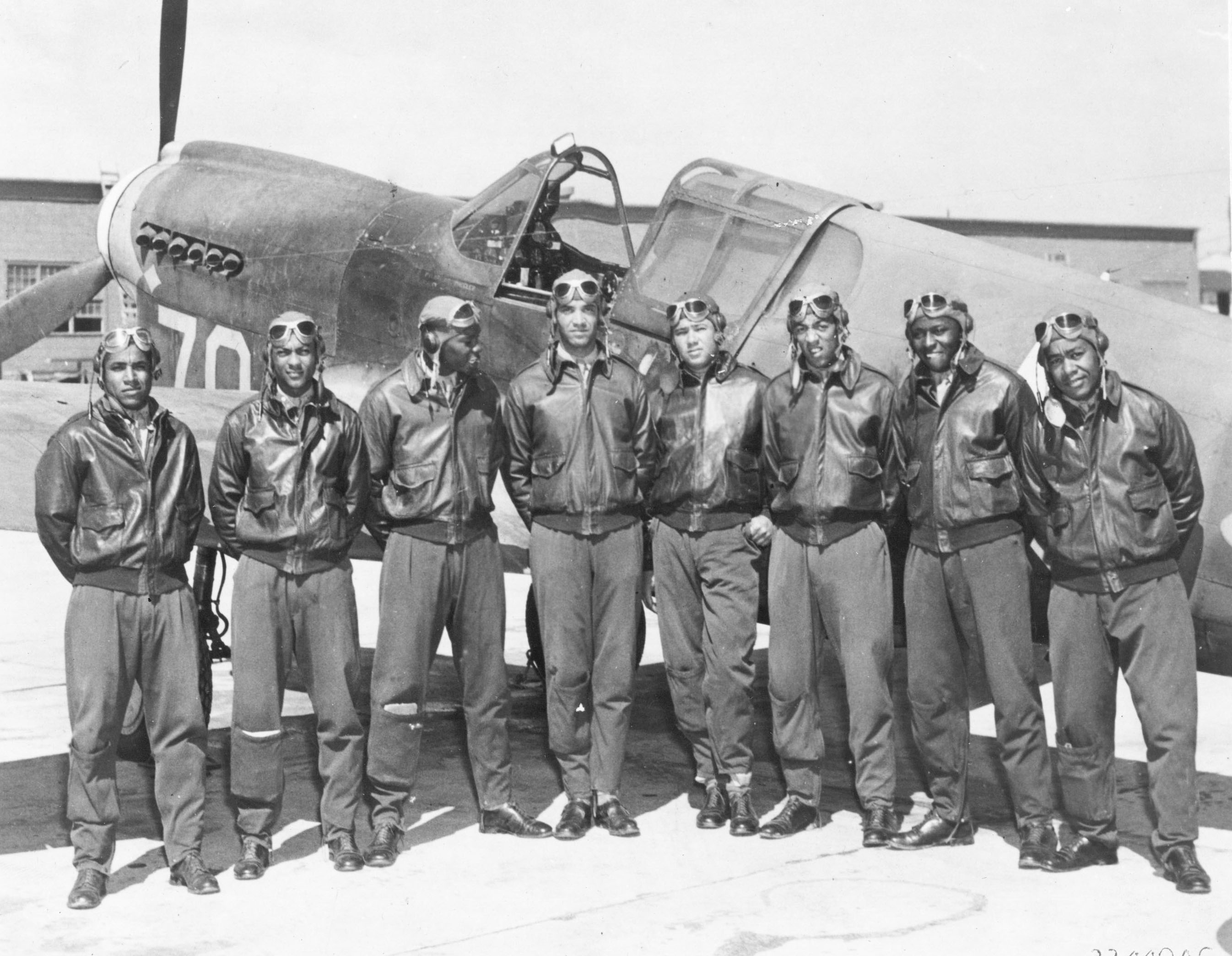
Tuskegee Airmen during WWII

== Awards ==
- 1996 ALA Best Book for Young Adults
- 1997 Carter G. Woodson Book Award – honor
