= A Song for Harlem =

Book by Patricia McKissack

Scraps of Time: 1928, A Song for Harlem
- First edition
- Author: Patricia McKissack
- Illustrator: Gordon James
- Language: English
- Subject: Children's literature, American history,
- Published: 2007 (Viking Press)
- Publication place: United States
- Media type: Print (hardback, paperback)
- Pages: 108
- ISBN: 9780670062096
- OCLC: 126225477

Scraps of Time: 1928, A Song for Harlem is a 2007 American book by Patricia McKissack about a girl, Lilly Belle, who spends the Summer of 1928 in Harlem, New York attending a writers' workshop led by Zora Neale Hurston.

== Reception ==
Booklist, reviewing A Song for Harlem, wrote "McKissack writes with empathy for the characters as well as a good eye for details that bring the period to life. Especially appripriate for aspiring writers, the themes of finding your voice and telling the truth resonate throughout this appealing chapter book." and the School Library Journal wrote "This easy-to-read novel has succinct chapters and sentences that, while simple, convey a feel for the characters and the time, and a vivid sense of place."

A Song for Harlem has also been reviewed by The Horn Book Magazine, and Kirkus Reviews.

It is a 2008 CCBC Choice.
