= Away West =

Children's historical novel

Scraps of Time: 1879, Away West
- First edition
- Authors: Patricia McKissack
- Illustrator: Gordon James
- Language: English
- Subject: Children's literature, American history,
- Published: 2006 (Viking Press)
- Publication place: United States
- Media type: Print (hardback, paperback)
- Pages: 121
- ISBN: 9780670060122
- OCLC: 61520244

Scraps of Time: 1879, Away West is a 2006 book by Patricia McKissack about a farmboy, Everett Turner, who runs away and joins the Exodusters, travelling to Nicodemus, Kansas.

== Reception ==
Away West has been reviewed by a number of journals including Booklist and the School Library Journal, that recommended it for developing readers, and Kirkus Reviews. It has been on school reading lists.
