= Let's Clap, Jump, Sing & Shout; Dance, Spin & Turn It Out! =

2017 book by Patricia McKissack

- First edition
- Author: Patricia McKissack
- Illustrator: Brian Pinkney
- Language: English
- Subject: Children's literature, Games, Songs, Fables
- Published: 2017 (Schwartz & Wade Books, an imprint of Random House Children's Books)
- Publication place: United States
- Media type: Print (hardback, paperback)
- Pages: 173
- ISBN: 978-0-375-87088-0
- OCLC: 947074808

Let's Clap, Jump, Sing & Shout; Dance, Spin & Turn It Out!: Games, Songs & Stories From An African American Childhood is a 2017 book by Patricia McKissack. It is a collection of games, songs, proverbs, stories including those from McKissack's childhood.

== Reception ==
The School Library Journal, in a star review of Let's Clap, Jump, Sing & Shout, wrote "Part songbook, part research text, this work is perfect for families to share together or for young scholars who seek to discover an important piece of cultural history. McKissack and Pinkney capture the essence of the songs, stories, and play of an African American childhood."

The Horn Book Magazine found "Children’s book royalty and storyteller supreme, Patricia McKissack here compiles an impressive and cohesive treasury of African American children’s culture .. Although sourcing is only variously complete and readers will have to find melody lines for the songs elsewhere, this is a rich compilation to stand beside Rollins’s Christmas Gif’ (rev. 5/94) and Hamilton's The People Could Fly (rev. 3/86)."

Let's Clap, Jump, Sing & Shout also received star reviews by Kirkus Reviews, and Publishers Weekly,
