= Voyage on the Great Titanic =

1998 novel by Ellen Emerson White

Voyage on the Great Titanic: The Diary of Margaret Ann Brady, R.M.S. Titanic, 1912
- First edition
- Author: Ellen Emerson White
- Language: English
- Series: Dear America
- Genre: Young adult fiction
- Publisher: Scholastic Inc., New York
- Publication date: 1998
- Publication place: United States
- Media type: Print
- Pages: 202
- ISBN: 0-590-96273-6
- LC Class: PZ
- Preceded by: Standing in the Light
- Followed by: A Line in the Sand

Voyage on the Great Titanic: The Diary of Margaret Ann Brady, RMS Titanic, 1912 is a romantic historical novel written by Ellen Emerson White, and is the eleventh book of the Dear America series. The book was first published in 1998, and republished with new cover art in 2010.

== Summary ==
13-year-old Margaret Ann Brady is an orphan whose parents died when she was only 8 years old. Subsequently, she was sent to live in an orphanage for girls, she lives a life of penury and dreams that her older brother, William, who lives in America, will someday earn enough money to send for her. One day, however, her fortunes take an unexpected turn for a better when a wealthy, privileged woman named Mrs. Carstairs expresses the desire for a companion for her upcoming trip to the States. The job, which involves simple tasks such as dressing her and walking her dog, is easy, and Margaret accepts readily.

Within merely a few days, Margaret and Mrs. Carstairs board the Titanic, the newly built and highly glamorous liner deemed to be supposedly "unsinkable," as first-class passengers. There, Margaret, who has lived most of her life in destitute conditions, is enthralled by her luxurious premises. She quickly becomes best friends with a handsome, young steward, Robert, and their relationship gradually turns romantic, though the two are too shy to tell each other.

All is going well, until one night, April 14, 1912, when Mrs. Carstairs and Margaret are awakened by a frantic shaking and noise. Robert informs them that the ship has just struck an iceberg, before advising them to put on their lifebelts. The two women obey and hurriedly make their way up to the deck where they discover with horror that the ship is sinking rapidly. Though her life is hanging in precariously on the line, Margaret is averse to leaving Robert, who is part of the crew and must remain on the ship, and runs back to him. Finding him sitting dejectedly alone in a vacant hallway, she attempts to persuade him to follow her. Robert, though, replies that he can't, and the two share a long, passionate kiss before parting.

Back on deck, Margaret is rapidly put in a lifeboat and whisked away. Floating for several hours, the small group is finally rescued when a passing ship picks them up. There, everyone, including Margaret, is treated for pneumonia and put to rest. Though she expresses hope for Robert's survival, it is later revealed in the book that he, in fact, did go down with the ship.

Though deeply distraught over Robert's death, Margaret decides to continue living for Robert, and later after arriving safely in America, Margaret is finally reunited with William, who heard of the Titanic's sinking and Margaret's survival, but he wanted to see her for himself before believing it.

Later while going with William to their new home, Margaret asks William if they could get a cat, and William agrees, adding that they can get two cats.

In the epilogue, Margaret continued to live with William, but dropped out of college when he was injured during World War I, and even though he did recover, she never went back to college. She wrote letters to Mrs. Carstairs (who left before William came to get Margaret), with her writing in return, but they never saw each other again. Margaret continued to suffer from survivor guilt, and has never forgiven herself for surviving the sinking of the Titanic. She refuses to travel by boat ever since. She later marries, and has three children, with her naming one of them "Robert" to honour Robert's memory. She later dies peacefully in her sleep in 1994 at the age of 95 years.
