= Ma Dear's Aprons =

- Author: Patricia McKissack
- Illustrator: Floyd Cooper
- Language: English
- Subject: Children's literature
- Published: 1997 (Atheneum Books for Young Readers)
- Publication place: United States
- Media type: Print (hardback, paperback)
- Pages: 32
- ISBN: 9780689810510
- OCLC: 31938515

Ma Dear's Aprons is a 1997 book by Patricia McKissack about the relationship between a son, David Earl, and his mother, Ma dear.

== Reception ==
Booklist, reviewing Ma Dear's Aprons, wrote "As with most loving memories, there is a softening of the harsh edges, but McKissack's words and Cooper's warm double-spread oil-wash paintings are true to the period. They show the exhausting work as well as the proud and loving bonds of family." The School Library Journal stated "The real story is Ma Dear's. Children who have this book read to them will see an African-American woman whose life in the rural south of the early 1900s was difficult but lived with dignity and joy."

The Horn Book Magazine found "There is little plot, but there is plenty of emotion and many details to attract a child. .. Text and illustrations together create a portrait of a family working hard to survive but also finding much to be joyful about."

Ma Dear's Aprons has also been reviewed by Kirkus Reviews, Publishers Weekly, and the Journal of Reading Education.

== Awards ==
- 1997 CCBC Choice
- 1998 Charlotte Zolotow Award - highly commended
- 2001 NCTE Kaleidoscope book
