= A Million Fish ... More or Less =

Book by Patricia McKissack

A Million Fish ... more or less
- Author: Patricia McKissack
- Illustrator: Dena Schutzer
- Language: English
- Genre: Children's picture book
- Published: 1992 (Knopf)
- Publication place: United States
- Media type: Print (hardback)
- Pages: 32 (unpaginated)
- ISBN: 9780679906926
- OCLC: 191730132

A Million Fish ... more or less is a 1992 children's picture book by Patricia McKissack. It is about a boy of the bayou, Hugh Thomas, who has a fishing adventure.

== Reception ==
Booklist, in a review of A Million Fish, called it "a joyful story about storytelling" and concluded "Rooted in the words and landscape of Louisiana's Bayou Clapateaux, this celebrates that we all live in "a mighty peculiar place." Entertainment Weekly wrote: "Dena Schutzer’s paintings swirl with movement and high-spirited fun, and Patricia McKissacks’ narrative is expansive, evocative, and tangy with Southern-flavored dialect. In all, a fine read-aloud for a hot summer day."

A Million Fish has also been reviewed by Kirkus Reviews, School Library Journal, Publishers Weekly,

== Awards ==
- 1992 CCBC Choice
- 1994 Kaleidoscope: A Multicultural Booklist for Grades K-8
- 1995 Young Hoosier Award Picture Book (K-3) - nominee
- 1996 NCTE Books That Invite Talk, Wonder, and Play
