= Never Forgotten =

2011 picture book by Pat McKissack

- Author: Pat McKissack
- Illustrator: Leo Dillon, Diane Dillon
- Language: English
- Genre: Children's literature, picture book, poetry
- Published: 2011 (Schwartz & Wade Books)
- Publication place: USA
- Media type: Print (hardback)
- Pages: 48
- ISBN: 9780375843846
- OCLC: 651153676

Never Forgotten is a 2011 picture book by Pat McKissack about a blacksmith father in West Africa who has Musafa, his son, kidnapped by slavers and with the assistance of the four elements discovers that Musafa is working in Charleston as a blacksmith's apprentice.

== Reception ==
School Library Journal, in a review of Never Forgotten, wrote "As an author, Patricia McKissack has always had a knack for language. Her wordplay can be a delight to listen to .. or chill you to the core. Here, she does both at once." and concluded " Ms. McKissack is striding into new territory here. And while I might have tweaked that ending a bit, there’s no denying that as a visual and audible product, Never Forgotten it is difficult to find a match. .. A true, unadulterated, original."

The Horn Book Magazine found "The free-verse text can weigh heavily on the ear, but the Dillons' rousing illustrations -- at once bold, complex, and lucid -- impart dramatic conviction to the thwarted Fire and the slave-boat beyond reach, the pursuing Wind peering into the Carolina blacksmith's window."

Never Forgotten has also been reviewed by Publishers Weekly, and Kirkus Reviews

It was a 2012 Coretta Scott King Author Award honor book.
