= Black Diamond: The Story of the Negro Baseball Leagues =

1994 book by Patricia McKissack and Fredrick McKissack, Jr.

- Author: Patricia McKissack, Fredrick McKissack, Jr.
- Language: English
- Subject: Children's literature, History of baseball
- Published: 1994 (Scholastic Press)
- Publication place: United States
- Media type: Print (hardback, paperback)
- Pages: 184
- ISBN: 978-0-590-45809-2
- OCLC: 28221299

Black Diamond: The Story of the Negro Baseball Leagues is a 1994 book by Patricia McKissack and Fredrick McKissack, Jr. It tells the history African-American and Latin American involvement with baseball in the United States.

== Reception ==
Booklist, in its review of Black Diamond: The Story of the Negro Baseball Leagues, wrote "This book goes far beyond the few familiar photographs and names most readers associate with the Negro Baseball Leagues, and it makes the trip in style."

Black Diamond has also been reviewed by The Horn Book Magazine, and Book Report.

The Negro Leagues Baseball Museum lists it as a secondary resource in its lesson on Negro league baseball vocabulary.

Black Diamonds is a 1994 CCBC Choice, a 1994 NCTE Kaleidoscope book, and received a 1997 Coretta Scott King Award author honor.
