= A Friendship for Today =

Book by Patricia McKissack

- Author: Patricia McKissack
- Language: English
- Genre: Children's literature,
- Published: 2007 (Scholastic Press)
- Publication place: USA
- Media type: Print (hardback, paperback)
- Pages: 172
- ISBN: 9780439660983
- OCLC: 74029160

A Friendship for Today is a 2007 book by Patricia McKissack about the life of a girl, Rosemary Patterson, attending one of the first integrated Missouri schools during the 1950s.

== Reception ==
School Library Journal, in its review of A Friendship for Today, found it "A wealth of historical references, from civil rights to polio vaccine to early TV, is embedded in the narrative." and concluded "Readers will enjoy the protagonist's spunky, resilient response to adversity and her candid, often amusing observations of human nature." and Booklist wrote "McKissack's insights into the two steps forward . . . one giant step back nature of the civil rights struggle are valuable, whether children encounter them on their own or in a classroom, where the novel will poignantly extend character education and history curricula."

A Friendship for Today has also been reviewed by The Horn Book Magazine, Kirkus Reviews, Library Media Connection, Multicultural Review, and Publishers Weekly.

== Awards ==
- 2008 CCBC Choice
- 2009-10 Mark Twain Award - nominee
- 2009-10 William Allen White Children's Book Award - nominee
- 2011 Rebecca Caudill Young Readers' Book Award - nominee
