= Let My People Go (book) =

Book by Patricia McKissack

Let My People Go: Bible Stories Told by a Freeman of Color
- Author: Patricia McKissack, Frederick McKissack
- Illustrator: James Ransome
- Language: English
- Genre: Children's literature, Historical novel, US history
- Published: 1998 (Atheneum Books for Young Readers)
- Publication place: United States
- Media type: Print (hardback, paperback)
- Pages: 134
- ISBN: 9780689808562
- OCLC: 36865694

Let My People Go: Bible Stories Told by a Freeman of Color is a 1998 book by Patricia McKissack. Set in 19th century South Carolina, it is about a freed slave, Price Jeffries, who uses Bible stories from the Old Testament to answer questions that his daughter, Charlotte, poses about the things she sees around her.

== Reception ==
Booklist, in its review of Let My People Go, called it "stirring" and concluded, "With the rhythm and intimacy of the oral tradition, this is storytelling for family and group sharing and also for talking about history and our connections with the universals of the Old Testament." School Library Journal found it "A masterful combination of Bible stories and African-American history."

Let My People Go has also been reviewed by Publishers Weekly, The Horn Book Magazine. Library Media Connection, Multicultural Review, and Parenting.

== Awards ==
- 1998 Capital Choices Noteworthy Book for Children and Teens
- 1998 CCBC Choice
- 2000 Anne Izard Storytellers' Award - winner
