= Color Me Dark =

2000 book by Patricia McKissack

Color Me Dark: The Diary of Nellie Lee Love, The Great Migration North
- First edition
- Author: Patricia McKissack
- Language: English
- Genre: Children's literature, African-American history
- Published: 2000 (Scholastic)
- Publication place: USA
- Media type: Print (hardback, paperback)
- Pages: 218
- ISBN: 9780590511599
- OCLC: 41649573

Color Me Dark: The Diary of Nellie Lee Love, The Great Migration North is a 2000 book by Patricia McKissack about a girl, Nellie, who from 1919 records her thoughts and experiences in a diary including her home in rural Tennessee, as a part of The Great Migration, and her new home in Chicago. It is part of the Dear America book series.

== Reception ==
School Library Journal, in a review of Color Me Dark, wrote "McKissack deftly explores the social unrest between blacks and whites and the social stratification within the black community, where newly arrived southern blacks were looked down upon by the more affluent residents."

Voice of Youth Advocates commended the Dear America format and wrote "McKissack has written a story about a family whose strength and solidarity will touch readers, regardless of their cultural or ethnic backgrounds. The author's notes and illustrations additionally serve as an excellent introduction not only to the civil rights movement but also to the lives and works of prominent African Americans."

Color Me Dark has also been reviewed by The Horn Book Magazine, Kirkus Reviews, and Booklist.

== Awards ==
- 1999-2001 NCTE Adventuring with Books: A Booklist for Pre-K--Grade 6 book
- 2001 Notable Social Studies Trade Book for Young People
- 2002 Indian Paintbrush Book Award - nominee
- 2017 National African American Read-In Supplemental List for Young Children book
