= The Honest-to-Goodness Truth =

2000 picture book by Patricia McKissack

- Author: Patricia McKissack,
- Illustrator: Giselle Potter
- Language: English
- Genre: Children's literature, children's picture book
- Published: 2000 (Atheneum Books)
- Publication place: USA
- Media type: Print (hardback, paperback)
- Pages: 40
- ISBN: 9780689826689
- OCLC: 40135279

The Honest-to-Goodness Truth is a 2000 picture book written by Patricia McKissack and illustrated by Giselle Potter. It is about a girl, Libby Louise, who decides to only tell the truth, the problems this causes, and her eventual understanding about the need for empathy and kindness in some situations.

== Reception ==
Booklist, in its review of The Honest-to-Goodness Truth, wrote "The story is very much a lesson, but it's a subtle one, and Potter's colorful, naive-style illustrations capture the innocence and eagerness of the "good girl" who learns that telling tales is not the way to be nice, that some things are private." and School Library Journal called it "A welcome offering about honesty and consideration."

Book Links has included it in a list of picture books that can be used to teach ethics to younger children and wrote "McKissack's book helps to convey the subtleties of being truthful to younger children who might not yet understand the difference between dishonesty and discretion.".

The Honest-to-Goodness Truth has also been reviewed by The Horn Book Magazine, Kirkus Reviews, Library Media Connection, and Publishers Weekly.

It appears on the 2002 NCTE Adventuring with Books for Pre-K—Grade 6 booklist.
