= Stitchin' and Pullin' =

2008 picture book by Patricia McKissack

Stitchin' and Pullin': A Gee's Bend Quilt
- Author: Patricia McKissack
- Illustrator: Cozbi A. Cabrera
- Language: English
- Subject: Children's literature, Picture book, Poetry
- Published: 2008 (Random House)
- Publication place: United States
- Media type: Print (hardback, paperback)
- Pages: 32 (unpaginated)
- ISBN: 9780375831638

Stitchin' and Pullin': A Gee's Bend Quilt is a 2008 picture book by Patricia McKissack and illustrated by Cozbi A. Cabrera. It is about a young girl, Baby girl, who, growing up amongst the quilters of Gee's Bend, Alabama, makes her first quilt.

== Reception ==
School Library Journal in its review of Stitchin' and Pullin' wrote "The story is full of love and spirit. Cabrera's acrylic paintings depict the richness of tradition and strength of character as connections are made between fabric and history." and Booklist stated "Both words and images glow with the love, creativity, and strength that are shared among the generations .."

The Horn Book Magazine found "Rich naif-style paintings in a warm, deep palette bring the poems to life and reflect their tone and spirit. McKissack detours a bit to tell about some of the icons and lesser-known martyrs of the Selma movement; while the history is fascinating, there are times when the more didactic poems interrupt Baby Girl's own story. However, it's marvelously clear that McKissack understands the creative pulse of the quilter and artist. "

Stitchin' and Pullin' has also been reviewed by Kirkus Reviews, and Library Media Connection.

It is a 2009 CCBC Choice.
