= Run Away Home =

1997 book by Patricia McKissack

- Author: Patricia McKissack
- Language: English
- Genre: Children's literature, Historical novel, US history
- Published: 1997 (Scholastic)
- Publication place: USA
- Media type: Print (hardback, paperback)
- Pages: 160
- ISBN: 9780590467513
- OCLC: 35620346

Run Away Home is a 1997 book by Patricia McKissack. Set in the late 19th century, it is about an African-American girl, Sarah Jane, who finds an Apache boy in the family barn and the subsequent affects on their lives.

== Reception ==
School Library Journal, in a review of Run Away Home, wrote "Grabbing readers with wonderful characters, an engaging plot, and vital themes, McKissack weaves a compelling story of cultural clash, tragedy, accommodation, and ultimate triumph." while Booklist found it a "generally fast-paced story flags occasionally when information-heavy dialogue intrudes." and concluded "The happy ending ties things up too neatly, but this story is fine for the undemanding reader who wants an old-fashioned, feel-good saga."

Run Away Home has also been reviewed by Publishers Weekly, and The Horn Book Magazine.

== Awards ==
- 1997 CCBC Choice
- 1999-2000 Young Hoosier Intermediate (4-6) Award - nominee
- 2000 NCTE Adventuring with Books: A Booklist for Pre-K to Grade 6
- 2001 NCTE Kaleidoscope: A Multicultural Booklist for Grades K-8
