= My Australian Story =

Historical novel series

My Australian Story is a series of historical novels for older children published by Scholastic Australia which was inspired by Dear America. Each book is written in the form of a fictional diary of a young person living during an important event or time period in Australian history.

== Series ==
- On Board the Boussole: The Diary of Julienne Fulbert, Laperouse's Voyage of Discovery, 1785-1788 by Christine Edwards (2002)
- Surviving Sydney Cove: The Convict Diary of Elizabeth Harvey, Sydney, 1790 by Goldie Alexander (2000)
- The Rum Rebellion: The Diary of David Bellamy, Sydney Town, 1807-1808 by Libby Gleeson (2001)
- A Banner Bold: The Diary of Rosa Aarons, Ballarat Goldfield, 1854 by Nadia Wheatley (2000)
- Archer's Melbourne Cup: The Diary of Robby Jenkins, Terara, New South Wales, 1860-1861 by Vashti Farrer (2007)
- New Gold Mountain: The Diary of Shu Cheong, Lambing Flat, New South Wales, 1860-1861 by Christopher W. Cheng (2005)
- Riding with Thunderbolt: The Diary of Ben Cross Northern NSW, 1865 by Allan Baillie (2004)
- The Yankee Whaler: The Diary of Thomas Morris, Bunbury, Western Australia, 1876 by Deborah Lisson (2001)
- Claw of the Dragon: The Diary of Billy Shanghai Hamilton, Broome, Western Australia, 1899-1900 by Patricia Bernard (2008)
- Plagues and Federation: The Diary of Kitty Barnes, The Rocks Sydney - 1900 by Vashti Farrer (2000)
- The Melting Pot: The Diary of Edward, Chek Chee, Sydney, 1903-1904 by Christopher W. Cheng (2007)
- Our Enemy, My Friend: The Diary of Emma Sheldrake, Adelaide Hills, 1915 by Jenny Blackman (2005)
- A Different Sort of Real: The Diary of Charlotte McKenzie, Melbourne, 1919 - 1919 by Kerry Greenwood (2001), also titled The Deadly Flu as printed in 2012, and Contagion: My Australian Story, Scholastic Australia, 2020
- Fords and Flying Machines: The Diary of Jack McLaren, Longreach, 1919-1921 by Patricia Bernard (2003)
- Outback: The Diary of Jimmy Porter, Central Australia, 1927-1928 by Christine Harris (2005), ISBN 186504850X
- Our Don Bradman: The Diary of Victor McDonald, Sydney, 1932 by Peter Allen (2004)
- Who am I? The Diary of Mary Talence, Sydney, 1937 by Anita Heiss (2001)
- The Bombing of Darwin: The Diary of Tom Taylor, Darwin, 1942 by Alan Tucker (2002)
- My Story: Journey to Tangiwai, The Diary of Peter Cotterill, Napier 1953 by David Hill (2003)
- Atomic Testing: The Diary of Anthony Brown, Woomera, 1953 by Alan Tucker (2009) ISBN 9781741692174
- A Marathon of Her Own: The Diary of Sophia Krikonis, Melbourne, 1956 by Irini Savvides (2004)
- Snowy: The Diary of Eva Fischer, Cabramurra, 1958-1959 by Siobhan McHugh (2003)
- A Tale of Two Families: The Diary of Jan Packard, Melbourne, 1974 by Jenny Pausacker (2000)
- Cyclone Tracy: The Diary of Ryan Turner, Darwin, 1974 by Alan Tucker (2006)
- Refugee: The Diary of Ali Ismail, Woomera, 2001-2002 by Alan Sunderland (2006)
- The Hunt for Ned Kelly by Sophie Masson (2010)
- The Phar Lap Mystery by Sophie Masson (2010)
- My Father's War by Sophie Masson (2011)
- The Melting Pot by Christopher Cheng (2011)
- Secrets and Sisterhood by Jenny Pausacker (2012)
- The Rum Rebellion by Libby Gleeson (2012)
- Snatched by Pirates by Patricia Barnard (2012)
- The Deadly Flu by Kerry Greenwood (2012)
- Voyage to Botany Bay by Chrissie Michaels (2012)
- Sydney Harbour Bridge by Vashti Farrer (2012)
- Heroes of Tobruk by David Mulligan (2012)
- Escape from Cockatoo Island by Yvette Poshoglian (2013)
- Gallipoli by Alan Tucker (2013)
- Fremantle Prison Break by Deborah Lisson (2013)
- Kokoda by Alan Tucker (2014)
- Convict Girl by Chrissie Michaels (2014)
- Black Sunday: Australia's Biggest Beach Rescue by Evan McHugh (2016)

== See also ==
- Dear America
- Dear Canada
- I Am Canada
- My Story
