= Ellen Emerson White =

American writer

Ellen Emerson White is an American author who has written a number of young adult fiction novels.

White grew up in Narragansett, Rhode Island. Many of her fiction novels feature characters who reside in Boston or are from Boston and are fans of the Boston Red Sox (as White is). White now resides in New York City.

== Writing ==
Ms. White wrote her first book, a murder mystery titled Friends for Life (1983), while she attended her freshmen year at Tufts University. She wrote The President's Daughter, the first in what would be a four book series, the following year.

In addition to her fiction novels, White has written both sports biographies and historical fiction/biography books. She wrote four stories about the Echo Company in the midst of the Vietnam War under the pseudonym Zack Emerson. White got the name Zack from the name of her shepherd dog. She has also written the Santa Paws series under the pseudonym Nicolas Edwards.

The young adult characters in White's novels are realistic people who struggle with very difficult lives—whether those lives include war, murder, kidnapping, or some other trouble. The focus of all of her books is on overcoming the difficulties and surviving as a better person. None of her characters' live what could be classified an "ordinary" life, but all are relatable to an "ordinary" person.

Elements of White's stories are connected within her works. For example, the character Trudy (President's Daughter series) is from Brighton, the section of Boston where Molly and Patrick (Where Have All the Flowers Gone?) live. Perhaps the most intricate cross-work involvement occurs with the character Susan McAllister/Dowd. In the final book of the President's Daughter series, Meg's JA at Williams College is Susan, whose 'life'is chronicled in Friends For Life, and Life Without Friends. Another example of these connections is the character of nurse Rebecca Phillips from The Echo Company series, who was romantically connected to an army grunt named Michael Jennings. Rebecca's future is hinted at in both "All Emergencies, Ring Super" and the Santa Paws series when a "Dr. Jennings" is mentioned. In addition, most of White's main characters are animal lovers, as is White.

== Published works ==
=== Series ===
==== The President's Daughter series ====
- The President's Daughter (1984)
- White House Autumn (1985)
- Long Live the Queen (1989) (Winner: ALA Best Book for Young Adults)
- Long May She Reign (2007) Released October 2007 by Feiwel & Friends, which is an imprint of Holtzbrinck.)

==== Echo Company series (as Zack Emerson) ====
- Echo Company #1: Welcome to Vietnam (1991)
- Echo Company #2: Hill 568 (1991)
- Echo Company #3: 'Tis The Season (1991)
- Echo Company #4: Stand Down (1992)

- The Road Home (as Ellen Emerson White) (1995) (Nominated: Young Reader's Choice Award, 1998; ALA Best Book for Young Adults ALA | 1996 Best Books for Young Adults)

==== Santa Paws series (as Nicholas Edwards) ====
- Santa Paws (1991)
- Return of Santa Paws (1997)
- Santa Paws to the Rescue (2000)
- Santa Paws, Come Home (2000)
- Santa Paws, Our Hero (2002)
- Santa Paws and the New Puppy (2004)

- None of the unauthorized books by Kris Edwards (Santa Paws Saves the Day [2005], Santa Paws and the Christmas Storm [2006], and Santa Paws on Christmas Island [2007]) have anything to do with the Santa Paws series, Nicholas Edwards, or Ellen Emerson White.

==== Friends series ====
- Friends for Life (1983)
- Life Without Friends (1987)

==== Historical fiction / biography ====
- Voyage on the Great Titanic (1998)
- Kaiulani: The People's Princess, Hawaii, 1889 (2001)
- The Journal of Patrick Seamus Flaherty: United States Marine Corps Khe Sanh, Vietnam, 1968 (2002)
- Where Have All the Flowers Gone?: The Diary of Molly Mackenzie Flaherty (2002)

==== My Story Series ====
Titanic: The Diary of Margaret Anne Brady

==== Sports biographies ====
- Bo Jackson: Playing the Games (1990)
- Jennifer Capriati (1991)
- Jim Abbott: Against All Odds (1994)
- Shaquille O'Neal (1994)

==== Short stories ====
- The Boy Next Door (collected in Thirteen)

=== Other books ===
- Romance is a Wonderful Thing (1983)
- All Emergencies, Ring Super (1998)
- Santa Paws: The Picture Book (2003)
- Webster: Tale of an Outlaw (2015)
- A Season of Daring Greatly (2017)
