= Porch Lies =

Porch Lies: Tales of Slicksters, Tricksters, and Other Wily Characters
- First edition
- Author: Patricia McKissack
- Illustrator: Andre´ Carrilho
- Language: English
- Subject: Children's literature
- Published: 2006 (Schwartz & Wade Books)
- Publication place: United States
- Media type: Print (hardback & paperback)
- Pages: 146
- ISBN: 9780375936197
- OCLC: 61278414

Porch Lies: Tales of Slicksters, Tricksters, and Other Wily Characters is a 2006 book by Patricia McKissack, and illustrated by Andre Carrilho, published by Schwartz & Wade Books. It is a collection of tales based on oral stories that McKissack heard from her grandfather and his friends when she was a child.

== Reception ==
Booklist, reviewing Porch Lies, noted that "History is always in the background (runaway slaves, segregation cruelty, white-robed Klansmen), and in surprising twists and turns that are true to trickster tradition, the weak and exploited beat powerful oppressors with the best lies ever told." and School Library Journal stated "they're great fun to read aloud and the tricksters, sharpies, slicksters, and outlaws wink knowingly at the child narrators, and at us foolish humans."

The Horn Book Magazine, although finding two of the tales not having "the same snap" as one of the others, appreciated others by calling them "a real cliffhanger", "a hum-dinger" and another that "scores on its crafty staging".

Porch Lies has also been reviewed by Kirkus Reviews, Publishers Weekly, Library Media Connection, Journal of Children's Literature, Reading Horizons, and Teaching Pre K-8.
