= Abby Takes a Stand =

Book by Patricia McKissack

- Author: Patricia McKissack
- Illustrator: Gordon C. James
- Language: English
- Series: Scraps of Time
- Subject: Children's literature, Historical Fiction
- Published: 2005 (Viking Press)
- Publication place: USA
- Media type: Print (hardback, paperback)
- Pages: 104
- ISBN: 9780670060115
- OCLC: 56591046

Abby Takes a Stand is a 2005 book by Patricia McKissack. It is the first book in the Scraps of Time series and is predominantly set in the 1960s. It concerns an African-American grandmother, Abby, talking with some of her young relatives about the time she was a young girl in Nashville, Tennessee, her experiences with racial segregation, and her involvement with the Civil Rights Movement.

== Reception ==
Booklist, reviewing Abby Takes a Stand, wrote "Although short and simply told, the book gives readers a kid's-eye view of important happenings and reminds them that history is something that is always in the making.", and School Library Journal found "This easy chapter book, with simple sentences, plenty of white space, and a liberal sprinkling of Gordon's expressive black-and-white drawings, is an appealing and welcome title."

The Horn Book Magazine wrote "McKissack deftly weaves all the familiar details of the time into this entry in the Scraps of Time series for emerging readers .. This accessible, lively, and heartfelt chapter book reads like a memoir and makes a perfect introduction to an extraordinary time when regular people, even ten-year-old girls, made a difference."

Abby Takes a Stand has also been reviewed by Kirkus Reviews, Publishers Weekly, and Multicultural Review.
