= Christmas in the Big House, Christmas in the Quarters =

1994 children's book by Patricia McKissack and Frederick McKissack

- Author: Patricia McKissack, Frederick McKissack
- Illustrator: John Thompson
- Language: English
- Genre: Children's book, Christmas
- Published: 1994 (Scholastic)
- Publication place: United States
- Media type: Print (hardback)
- Pages: 68
- Awards: 1995 Coretta Scott King Author Award
- ISBN: 978-0-590-43027-2
- OCLC: 26858298

Christmas in the Big House, Christmas in the Quarters is a 1994 children's book by Patricia McKissack and Frederick McKissack. It is about the preparations and workings around the Christmas season on a slave plantation in 1850s Virginia.

== Reception ==
Publishers Weekly, reviewing Christmas in the Big House, wrote "This is a book of significant dimension and importance, and could be read at any time of year. The authors also add riddles, rhymes, recipes and copious notes. Rendered in acrylic on board, Thompson's remarkably realistic paintings are charged with emotion and masterfully tie together the book's diverse contents." Kirkus Reviews, on the other hand, wrote "The McKissacks .. have written a strangely romantic view of a pre-emancipation Christmas." and concluded "The line between glorifying aspects of slave culture and seeming to ignore the brute evil of slavery is thin. Unfortunately, the McKissacks have stepped over."

Christmas in the Big House has also been reviewed by Booklist, The Horn Book Magazine, and Library Talk.

== Awards ==
- 1994 CCBC Choice
- 1995 Coretta Scott King Book Author Award - winner
- 1995 Orbis Pictus Award - honor
