= The Clone Codes =

2010 book by Patricia and Fredrick McKissack

- First edition
- Author: Patricia McKissack, Fredrick McKissack, John Patrick McKissack
- Cover artist: Ken Choi
- Language: English
- Genre: Children's literature, Science fiction
- Published: 2010 (Scholastic Press)
- Publication place: United States
- Media type: Print (hardback, paperback)
- Pages: 173
- ISBN: 9780439929837
- OCLC: 426389600

The Clone Codes is a 2010 science fiction novel by American writers Patricia and Fredrick McKissack. It is about a girl, Leanna, who lives in 22nd century America where human clones and cyborgs are treated like second-class citizens, and what happens when she discovers that her parents are activists and that she is a clone.

== Reception ==
Booklist, in its review of The Clone Codes, wrote "The McKissacks' slight story for younger readers packs a great deal of messaging, which will no doubt prove useful in classroom discussions of issues and themes but sometimes comes at the expense of the story. The science-fiction backdrop serves as a framework for issues of identity and societal prejudice but is not predominant in the reading experience." School Library Journal's review was more critical, calling it "A clunky, didactic science-fiction allegory." and wrote "Some aspects of the plot are predictable and poorly drawn .. too many references to the distant past .. prevent the futuristic setting from coming to life." Nevertheless, it did conclude "Still, the fast pace, short chapters, and slim page count will make this volume attractive to reluctant readers, and the obvious curriculum tie-ins will appeal to teachers."

The Clone Codes has also been reviewed by The Horn Book Magazine, Library Media Connection, Voice of Youth Advocates, Kirkus Reviews, Publishers Weekly, The Bulletin of the Center for Children's Books, and Multicultural Review.

It was an Iowa Children's Choice Award nominee.
