= Rachel Isadora =

American writer

Rachel Isadora (born 1953) is an American illustrator, children's book author, specializing in picture books, and painter. She is most famous for the book Ben's Trumpet, runner-up for the 1980 Caldecott Medal, or Caldecott Honor Book, and winner of the Boston Globe-Horn Book honor. Ben's Trumpet was adapted to video and also translated into a ballet by the Boston ballet company BalletRox in 2009. The more than 150 children's books Isadora has written and illustrated span a wide variety of topics, including ballet and dance, American urban culture and family life, life in Africa, and traditional fairy tales. Several of Isadora’s books have been selected by Dolly Parton’s Imagination Library. Isadora was a professional ballet dancer before an injury led to a change of careers. In addition to freelance writing and illustration, Isadora shows and sells oil paintings, many of which reflect her love of dance, as well as her experiences living in Africa and New York City.

== Biography ==
Isadora started dancing as a young girl and went on to study at the School of American Ballet on a scholarship from the Ford Foundation. She studied under New York City Ballet founder and artistic director, George Balanchine, and costume and scenic designer, Rouben Ter-Arutunion. She briefly danced with the Boston Ballet Company, until a foot injury caused her to seek work as a visual artist instead. Her first book published in 1976, Max, is about a boy who realizes that taking ballet can help him become a better baseball player. Max was named an ALA Notable Book. Many of her other works incorporate ballet and dance, most notably the series, Lili at Ballet, Lili on Stage, Lili Backstage, and the Caldecott Honor award-winning Ben's Trumpet, which combines music and dance.

She lived in Africa for almost ten years, and has adapted a number of well-known stories and fairy tales to African settings, including Rapunzel, The Princess and the Pea, Hanzel and Gretel, The Fisherman and His Wife, The Twelve Dancing Princesses, The Night before Christmas, and The Twelve Days of Christmas.

Isadora's love for visual arts continues as well through her oil paintings. Her solo exhibit in 2016 called "Art of the Dance" featured 25 paintings about classic ballet and modern dance. She has continued to exhibit in multiple shows; in 2019 at ArtNY, The Reveal Art Show in Saratoga Springs, NY and ArtMiami.

== Works ==
=== Writer and illustrator ===
1. Max, Macmillan (New York, NY), 1976
2. The Potters' Kitchen, Greenwillow (New York, NY), 1977
3. Willaby, Macmillan (New York, NY), 1977
4. Backstage, with Robert Maiorano, Greenwillow (New York, NY), 1978
5. Ben's Trumpet, Greenwillow (New York, NY), 1979
6. My Ballet Class, Greenwillow (New York, NY), 1980
7. No, Agatha!, Greenwillow (New York, NY), 1980
8. Jesse and Abe, Greenwillow (New York, NY), 1981
9. The Nutcracker, (Retold) Macmillan (New York, NY), 1981
10. City Seen from A to Z, Greenwillow (New York, NY), 1983
11. Opening Night, Greenwillow (New York, NY), 1984
12. I Hear, Greenwillow (New York, NY), 1985
13. I See, Greenwillow (New York, NY), 1985
14. I Touch, Greenwillow (New York, NY), 1985
15. The Pirates of Bedford Street, Greenwillow (New York, NY), 1988
16. The Princess and the Frog (based on The Frog King and Iron Heinrich by Wilhelm and Jacob Grimm), Greenwillow (New York, NY), 1989
17. Swan Lake: A Ballet Story (based on the ballet Swan Lake by Pyotr Ilich Tchaikovsky), Putnam (New York, NY), 1989
18. Friends, Greenwillow (New York, NY), 1990
19. Babies, Greenwillow (New York, NY), 1990
20. At the Crossroads, Greenwillow (New York, NY), 1991
21. Over the Green Hills, Greenwillow (New York, NY), 1992
22. Lili at Ballet, Greenwillow (New York, NY), 1993
23. Firebird (based on the ballet by Stravinsky), Putnam (New York, NY), 1994
24. My Ballet Diary, Penguin Putnam (New York, NY), 1995
25. Lili on Stage, Penguin Putnam (New York, NY), 1995
26. The Steadfast Tin Soldier (based on the story by Hans Christian Andersen), Penguin Putnam (New York, NY), 1996
27. The Little Match Girl (based on the story by Hans Christian Andersen), Penguin Putnam (New York, NY), 1996
28. Lili Backstage, Penguin Putnam (New York, NY), 1997
29. Young Mozart, Penguin (New York, NY), 1997.
30. The Little Mermaid (based on the story by Hans Christian Andersen), Penguin Putnam (New York, NY), 1998.
31. Isadora Dances, Viking Penguin (New York, NY), 1998
32. A South African Night, HarperCollins (New York, NY), 1998
33. Caribbean Dreams, Putnam (New York, NY), 1998
34. Listen to the City, Putnam (New York, NY), 1999
35. ABC Pop!, Viking Penguin (New York, NY), 1999
36. Sophie Skates, Penguin Putnam (New York, NY), 1999
37. 123 Pop!, Penguin Putnam (New York, NY), 2000
38. Nick Plays Baseball, Penguin Putnam (New York, NY), 2001
39. Bring on That Beat, Penguin Putnam (New York, NY), 2002
40. Peekaboo Morning, Penguin Putnam (New York, NY), 2002
41. Mr. Moon, Greenwillow (New York, NY), 2002
42. On Your Toes: A Ballet ABC, Greenwillow (New York, NY), 2003
43. Not Just Tutus, Putnam (New York, NY), 2003
44. In the Beginning, Putnam (New York, NY), 2003
45. What a Family, Putnam (New York, NY), 2005
46. Luke Goes to Bat, Putnam (New York, NY), 2005
47. Yo, Jo!, Harcourt (Orlando, FL), 2007
48. The Princess and the Pea (based on the story by the Brothers Grimm), Putnam Juvenile (2007)
49. Rapunzel, (based on the story by the Brothers Grimm), Putnam Juvenile (2008)
50. The Fisherman and His Wife, (based on the story by the Brothers Grimm), Putnam Juvenile (2008)
51. The Twelve Dancing Princesses (based on the story by the Brothers Grimm), Putnam Juvenile (2008)
52. Hanzel and Gretel (based on the story by the Brothers Grimm), Putnam Juvenile (2009)
53. The Night before Christmas, Putnam Juvenile (2009)
54. The Twelve Days of Christmas, Putnam Juvenile (2010)
55. Say Hello, Putnam Juvenile, (2010)
56. There Was a Tree (adapted from the folk song "And the Green Grass Grew All Around"), Nancy Paulsen Books, Division of Penguin Random House, (2012)
57. Bea at the Ballet, Nancy Paulsen Books, Division of Penguin Random House (2012)
58. Old Mikamba Had a Farm, Nancy Paulsen Books, Division of Penguin Random House, (2013)
59. Jake at Gymnastics, Nancy Paulsen Books, Division of Penguin Random House, (2014)
60. Bea in the Nutcracker, Nancy Paulsen Books, Division of Penguin Random House, (2015)
61. I Hear a Pickle, Nancy Paulsen Books, Division of Penguin Random House, (2016)
62. I Just Want to Say Goodnight, Nancy Paulsen Books, Division of Penguin Random House, (Pub Date, Fall, 2016)
63. My Dog Laughs, Nancy Paulsen Books, Division of Penguin Random House, (Pub Date, Spring, 2017)

=== Illustrator ===
- Robert Maiorano, Francisco, Macmillan (New York, NY), 1978
- Elizabeth Shub, Seeing Is Believing, Greenwillow (New York, NY), 1979
- Robert Maiorano, A Little Interlude, Coward, McCann & Geoghegan (New York, NY), 1980
- Elizabeth Shub, The White Stallion, Greenwillow (New York, NY), 1982
- Elizabeth Shub, Cutlass in the Snow, Greenwillow (New York, NY), 1986
- Patricia C. McKissack, Flossie & the Fox, Dial (New York, NY), 1986
- Ruth Young, Golden Bear, Viking (New York, NY), 1990
- Sandol Stoddard, editor, Prayers, Praises, and Thanksgivings, Dial (New York, NY), 1992
- Reeve Lindbergh, Grandfather's Lovesong, Viking (New York, NY), 1993
- Jane Kurtz, In the Small, Small Night, Greenwillow (New York, NY), 2005
- Deborah Hopkinson, Saving Strawberry Farm, Greenwillow (New York, NY), 2005
- Carolyn Vaughan, "Invitation to Ballet: A Celebration of Dance and Degas", The Metropolitan Museum of Art, Abrams Books (2012)

=== Painter ===
To view Isadora’s paintings, refer to this link to her Official website, rachelisadora.com.

== Awards and honors ==
- Max received the 1976 Child Study Association Children's Book of the Year award; Children's Choice award, International Reading Association/Children's Book Council (CBC), 1976; Children's Book Showcase award, CBC, 1977; American Library Association (ALA) notable book citation, and was designated a Reading Rainbow selection
- 1979 ALA Notable Book citation, for Seeing Is Believing, written by Elizabeth Shub
- Ben's Trumpet received a Boston Globe/Horn Book honor book for illustration citation in 1979; Best Book for Spring designation, School Library Journal, 1979; and the Caldecott Honor Book award, 1980
- 1982 Best Book award, School Library Journal, and ALA notable book citation for The White Stallion, by Elizabeth Shub
- 1982 Children's Book award, New York Public Library, for City Seen from A to Z
- 1985 Child Study Association Children's Book of the Year award for I Hear and I See
- 1986 Child Study Association Children's Book of the Year awards for Flossie and the Fox, by Patricia C. McKissack (which also received a 1987 Horn Book honor list citation) and Cutlass in the Snow, by Elizabeth Shub
- 1991 ALA Notable Book citation for At the Crossroads
- 2008 Parent's Choice award for "The Fisherman and His Wife"
- 2011 Virginia Reader's Choice award for "Hansel and Gretel"
- 2012 Horn Book award for "Bea at Ballet"
- 2013 ALA Notable Book award for "Old Mikamba Had a Farm"
- 2013 100 top Children's Books of the Last 100 Years - New York Public Library includes "Ben's Trumpet"
- 2015 Kirkus Review - 3 Star Reviews for "I Hear a Pickle"
- 2016 School Library Journal, Amazon Featured Best Book of Month for January - "I Hear a Pickle"

== Legacy ==
Ben's Trumpet was adapted into a jazz ballet choreographed by Tony Williams and debuted by BalletRox in 2009.
