= A Journey to the New World =

1996 novel by Kathryn Lasky

A Journey to the New World: The Diary of Remember Patience Whipple, Mayflower, 1620
- Original 1996 release cover
- Author: Kathryn Lasky
- Language: English
- Series: Dear America
- Genre: young adult fiction
- Publisher: Scholastic, Inc
- Publication date: September 1, 1996
- Publication place: United States
- Media type: Print
- Followed by: The Winter of Red Snow

Original 2010 release cover

A Journey to the New World: The Diary of Remember Patience Whipple, Mayflower, 1620 is a historical novel for young readers. It is the first book in the series Dear America. Remember Patience Whipple is a girl who was on board the Mayflower and is sailing from England. She is headed toward the New World with her family of four. Mr. Whipple is Patience’s father and can fix things. Mam, Patience’s mother, and Blessing who is Patience’s little sister. Patience has a friend called Hummy and she too is sailing on the Mayflower to the New World. Hummy's father is who takes care of her, because Hummy's mother died, this makes Hummy's father very melancholic. This is the first novel in the Dear America series.
