= A Picture of Freedom =

1997 novel by Patricia McKissack

A Picture of Freedom: The Diary of Clotee, a Slave Girl
- Author: Patricia McKissack
- Language: English
- Series: Dear America
- Genre: Young adult
- Publisher: Scholastic
- Publication date: March 1997
- Media type: Print ()
- Pages: 202
- ISBN: 978-0-590-25988-0
- Preceded by: When Will This Cruel War Be Over?
- Followed by: Across the Wide and Lonesome Prairie

A Picture of Freedom is a children's historical novel written by Patricia C. McKissack and published by Scholastic in 1997 as part of their Dear America series.

== Plot summary ==
The book is written in the form of a diary kept by Clotee, a young slave girl on a Virginia plantation in 1859. Clotee secretly teaches herself to read and write while fanning William, her owner's young son, during his lessons with his mother Miz Lilly. Clotee is discovered by Mr Harms, the tutor, who is actually an abolitionist working to help slaves escape via the Underground Railroad. When Clotee is given the opportunity to escape, she must decide whether to run away to freedom or stay behind to help other slaves escape.

Clotee's best friend on the plantation is a very strong girl named Spicy. Spicy desperately wants to change her name to Rose (the name her mother picked out for her), but is forced to accept the name given by her owners. Clotee later writes in Spicy's Bible, the only keepsake that Spicy has from her mother, that Spicy's name is actually Rose. Spicy is also in love with Hince, the person who Clotee calls her "brother-friend".

Clotee and Spicy are the property of "Mas' Henley," a cruel man. While Master Henley never whips or beats Clotee in the book, he does strike Spicy across the face in the final chapter. Mistress Lilly Henley is a weak, foolish woman and a disinterested mother. Clotee's mother was Lilly Henley's personal maid, but Master Henley forced his wife to sell her maid; Clotee's mother later died far from her daughter. Clotee's father is not present in the story as he drowned in the river before she was born. Mistress Lilly often tries to make Clotee her little pet, claiming that Clotee's mother was a very good friend of hers. Clotee always finds a way to decline and Lilly soon gives up, taking another housemaid under her wing and trying to turn the household servants against each other.

When Ely Harms is driven off the Henley Plantation, Clotee takes his place as a conductor on the Underground Railroad. Clotee comes up with a plan so that Mr Harms didn't get arrested. Clotee eventually runs away; we later learn that she has become a teacher. She also keeps up correspondence with William Henley, who becomes an abolitionist as well. Clotee dies at the age of 92, and the book ends with the quote from her gravestone: "Freedom is more than a word".

== Adaptations ==
In 1997, the book was adapted for television by HBO for their Dear America miniseries. The episode starred Shadia Simmons as Clotee.

== Further reading and reviews ==
- Burnett, Jeanie (Winter 1997–1998). "A Picture of Freedom: The Diary of Clotee, A Slave Girl, Belmont, Virginia, 1859". Childhood Education. 74 (2): 106. ProQuest 210384139.
- Chandler, Karen (2006). "Paths to Freedom: Literacy and Folk Traditions in Recent Narratives about Slavery and Emancipation". Children's Literature Association Quarterly. 31 (1): 3–26. doi:10.1353/chq.2006.0022. ISSN 1553-1201. S2CID 143986439.
- Hubler, Angela E. (2000). "Girl Power and History in the Dear America Series Books". Children's Literature Association Quarterly. 25 (2): 98–106. doi:10.1353/chq.0.1657. ISSN 1553-1201. S2CID 144302979.
- Connan-Pintado, Christiane (June 6, 2022), Fictionalisation of Slavery in Children's Books in France, De Gruyter, pp. 313–324, doi:10.1515/9783110733501-022, ISBN 978-3-11-073350-1
