= I Am Canada =

Series of non-fiction books

I Am Canada is a series of Canadian historical novels marketed at older boys, with the first book being published in September 2010. The series is written by a variety of Canadian authors and is published by Scholastic Canada Ltd.

The books are a mixture of fact and fiction, including actual maps, documents and photographs alongside first-person narratives. The stories are set all over the world, showing the involvement of Canadians in world events as well as the history of Canada.

== Books ==
- Yee, Paul (January 1, 2000). Blood and Iron: Building the Railway, Lee Heen-gwong, British Columbia, 1882. Scholastic Canada.
- Brewster, Hugh (September 1, 2010). Prisoner of Dieppe: World War II, Alistair Morrison, Occupied France, 1942. Scholastic Canada. ISBN 9780545985949.
- Wilson, John (February 1, 2011). Shot at Dawn: World War I, Allan McBride, France, 1917. Scholastic Canada. ISBN 9780545985956.
- Brewster, Hugh (September 1, 2011). Deadly Voyage: RMS Titanic, Jamie Laidlaw, April 14, 1912. Scholastic Canada. ISBN 9781443104654.
- Matas, Carol (February 1, 2012). Behind Enemy Lines: World War II, Sam Frederiksen, Nazi-Occupied Europe, 1944. Scholastic Canada. ISBN 9780545990660.
- Chan, Gillian (September 1, 2012). A Call to Battle: The War of 1812, Alexander MacKay, Upper Canada, 1812. Scholastic Canada. ISBN 9781443100069.
- Trottier, Maxine (February 1, 2013). Storm the Fortress: The Siege of Quebec, William Jenkins, New France, 1759. Scholastic Canada. ISBN 9781443100076.
- Ward, David (September 1, 2013). Fire in the Sky: World War I, Paul Townend, Over No Man's Land, 1916. Scholastic Canada. ISBN 9781443104005.
- Wilson, John (January 1, 2014). Graves of Ice: The Lost Franklin Expedition, The Northwest Passage, George Chambers, 1845. Scholastic Canada. ISBN 9781443107945.
- Kay, Edward (September 1, 2014). Sink and Destroy: The Battle of the Atlantic, Bill O'Connell, North Atlantic, 1940. Scholastic Canada. ISBN 9781443107815.
- Chan, Gillian (February 1, 2015). Defend or Die: The Siege of Hong Kong, Jack Finnigan, Hong Kong, 1941. Scholastic Canada. ISBN 9781443113052.
- Aker, Don (September 1, 2015). Brothers in Arms: The Siege of Louisbourg, Sébastien deL'Espérance, New France, 1758. Scholastic Canada. ISBN 9781443119597.
- Webb, Jonathan (October 1, 2016). Sniper Fire: The Fight for Ortona, Paul Baldassara, Italy, 1943. Scholastic Canada. ISBN 9781443128612.

== Awards and honours ==
Awards for I am Canada books
Year	Title	Award	Result	Ref.
2012	Behind Enemy Lines	Forest of Reading Golden Oak Award	Finalist	
2012	Shot at Dawn	Geoffrey Bilson Award	Finalist	
2013	A Call to Battle	Geoffrey Bilson Award	Finalist	

== See also ==
- Dear Canada
- My Name is America
- My Australian Story
- My Story
- History of Canada
