= Patricia McKissack =

American writer (1944–2017)

- McKissack in 2012
- Born: Patricia L'Ann Carwell; August 9, 1944; Smyrna, Tennessee, U.S.
- Died: April 7, 2017 (aged 72); Bridgeton, Missouri, U.S.
- Spouse: Fredrick McKissack
- Writing career
- Pen name: L'Ann Carwell; Pat McKissack; Patricia C. McKissack
- Period: 1985–2017
- Genres: Children's literature, Biography, Historical fiction, Folktale

Patricia C. McKissack (née Carwell; August 9, 1944 – April 7, 2017) was a prolific African-American children's writer. She was the author of more than 100 books, including Dear America books A Picture of Freedom: The Diary of Clotee, a Slave Girl; Color Me Dark: The Diary of Nellie Lee Love, The Great Migration North; and Look to the Hills: The Diary of Lozette Moreau, a French Slave Girl. She also wrote a novel for The Royal Diaries series: Nzingha: Warrior Queen of Matamba. Notable standalone works include Flossie & the Fox (1986), The Dark-Thirty: Southern Tales of the Supernatural (1992), and Sojourner Truth: Ain't I a Woman? (1992). What is Given from the Heart was published posthumously in 2019.

McKissack lived in St. Louis. In addition to her solo work, she co-wrote many books with her husband, Fredrick, with whom she also co-won the Regina Medal in 1998. McKissack died in April 2017 at the age of 73.

Patricia McKissack was also a board member of the National Children's Book and Literacy Alliance, a national not-for-profit that actively advocates for literacy, literature, and libraries.

She also published under the names L'Ann Carwell, Pat McKissack, and Patricia C. McKissack.

== Biography ==
Patricia L'Ann Carwell was born to parents Robert and Erma Carwell on August 9, 1944, in Smyrna, Tennessee. She was inspired to be a writer by her mother, who liked to read her the poetry of Paul Laurence Dunbar, and by her grandparents who told her many stories. Her grandfather's stories usually included the names of her and siblings Nolan and Sarah. Many of the childhood stories she heard from her mother and grandparents later became stories she wrote as an author of books for children and young adults. Other stories, such as Goin' Someplace Special (2000), incorporated McKissack's lived experiences. In Goin' Someplace Special, she recalled her favorite place to go as a child, which was the Nashville Public Library. The library was one of the few places in downtown Nashville that was not segregated, so it became a place where McKissack always felt welcome and where she learned her love for reading.

While attending Tennessee Agricultural and Industrial State University, now known as the Tennessee State University, McKissack met up with a childhood friend, Fredrick McKissack, who would later become her husband. She graduated with an English degree in 1964, while Fredrick obtained a civil engineering degree. They were married on December 12, 1965, and started their family right away. After traveling to Missouri, McKissack attended Webster University and graduated with a M.A. in child education. She then became a junior high-school English teacher, but in 1971 realized that she wanted to be an author. After Fredrick's business failed in 1980, the couple decided to pursue a new career path together—writing full-time. They continued their writing partnership up until his death in 2013.

Patricia and Fredrick had three sons. The eldest, Fredrick McKissack, Jr., is also a writer and a journalist who collaborated with his mother to create several books, including the award-winning book for older readers, Black Diamond: The Story of the Negro Baseball Leagues (1994). Her other two sons, twins Robert Lewis and John Patrick, also collaborated on separate projects with their mother. Robert co-wrote Itching and Twitching: A Nigerian Folktale (2003), and John Patrick co-wrote The Clone Codes trilogy (2010, 2011, 2012). For many years, the McKissacks lived in a renovated inner-city home. In 1995, they moved to Chesterfield, Missouri, a suburb of St. Louis.

Patricia and Fredrick McKissack worked and published more than 100 books together over the course of 20 years. At the time of Fredrick's death, they were working together on at least one work—Let's Clap, Jump, Sing & Shout; Dance, Spin & Turn It Out!: Games, Songs & Stories From An African American Childhood (2017)—which Patricia completed on her own. McKissack continued writing on her own, but died of cardio-respiratory arrest on April 7, 2017, at the age of 72.

== Career ==
In 1975, Patricia McKissack began her professional writing career. In 1980, she became a full-time author. Her family moved to St. Louis, where she started a writing service. Her husband, Fredrick, also became interested in writing and researching for non-fiction books. One of their goals as a couple was to introduce children to African-American history and the historical figures that went along with it. Fredrick was the researcher of the pair, while Patricia mostly wrote up the research. They worked together to make manuscripts that suited them both, and together they aimed to make history come alive in stories for children. She and Fredrick believed strongly in the contributions of African Americans, and it showed in many of the stories they created together.

Patricia and Fredrick co-authored many books together, starting in 1984, with a biography of Paul Laurence Dunbar entitled Paul Laurence Dunbar: A Poet to Remember. McKissack went on to write many more biographies, some with Fredrick and some by herself, about prominent African American figures, including Frederick Douglass, Langston Hughes, and Sojourner Truth.

McKissack wrote mostly non-fiction and focused on issues such as racism and African American history. She wrote several non-fiction books before her first picture book, Flossie & the Fox, which was eventually published in 1986 at Dial Press. This was soon followed by Mirandy and Brother Wind (1988) and Nettie Jo's Friends (1989), all of which focused on Southern African American girls, and were written in an old style of African-American Vernacular English.

The Dark-Thirty: Southern Tales of the Supernatural (1992) is McKissack's work most widely held in WorldCat participating libraries. It is a book she wrote from childhood memories, describing the 30 minutes before dark on a summer night when her grandmother would tell spooky stories to her grandchildren.

Patricia and Fredrick worked collaboratively on many works including A Long Hard Journey: The Story of Pullman Porter, which won the Coretta Scott King Award in 1990. They also were the authors of Sojourner Truth: Ain't I a Woman, which also won the Coretta Scott King Award in 1993. Patricia is also a recipient of a Newbery Honor Book citation (Newbery Medal runner-up), the National Council of Teachers of English's Orbis Pictus Award, the Boston Globe–Horn Book Award, and an NAACP Image Award. After Fredrick's death the McKissacks jointly received the Coretta Scott King – Virginia Hamilton Award for Lifetime Achievement.

== Awards ==
- 1990: Coretta Scott King Award, winner, A Long Hard Journey: The Story of the Pullman Porter (Fredrick & Patricia)
- 1990: Jane Addams Children's Book Award, winner, A Long Hard Journey: The Story of the Pullman Porter (Fredrick & Patricia)
- 1993: Carter G. Woodson Book Award, winner, Madam C.J. Walker (Patricia & Fredrick)
- 1993: Coretta Scott King Award, winner, The Dark-Thirty: Southern Tales of the Supernatural
- 1995: Coretta Scott King Award], winner, Christmas in the Big House, Christmas in the Quarters (Fredrick & Patricia)
- 2012: PEN/Steven Kroll Award, winner, Never Forgotten
- 2014: Virginia Hamilton Award for Lifetime Achievement (Fredrick & Patricia)

Beside the three Coretta Scott King Award winners listed here, six other books by McKissack were runners-up or Coretta Scott King Honor Books (all in the writers category). All nine of those books are marked in the list of works immediately below (‡).

Other runners-up:

- 1993: Horn Book Award, runner-up, Sojourner Truth: Ain't I a Woman? (Fredrick & Patricia)
- 1993: Newbery Medal runner-up, The Dark-Thirty: Southern Tales of the Supernatural
- 1995: Orbis Pictus Award, honor book, Christmas in the Big House, Christmas in the Quarters (Fredrick & Patricia)

== Selected books ==
- The Good Shepherd Prayer: Understanding the 23rd Psalm, as by L'Ann Carwell, illustrated by Pam Erickson (1979)
- God Gives New Life, as Carwell, illus. Deborah Stockton Miller (Concordia, 1981)
- Who Is Who?, illus. Elizabeth M. Allen (1983)
- Paul Laurence Dunbar: A Poet to Remember (1984)
- Aztec Indians (1985)
- Flossie & the Fox, illus. Rachel Isadora (1986)
- The Civil Rights Movement in America from 1865 to the Present, with Fredrick McKissack (1987)
- Messy Bessey, with Fredrick McKissack (1987)
- Bugs!, with Fredrick McKissack (1988)
- Mirandy and Brother Wind (1988)
- A Piece of the Wind and Other Stories to Tell (1990)
- A Long Hard Journey: The Story of the Pullman Porter, with Fredrick McKissack (1990) ‡
- Carter G. Woodson: The Father of Black History (1991)
- Frederick Douglass: Leader against Slavery, with Fredrick McKissack (1991)
- Ralph J. Bunche: Peacemaker (1991)
- A Million Fish ... more or less (1992)
- Sojourner Truth: Ain't I a Woman? (1992) ‡
- The Dark-Thirty: Southern Tales of the Supernatural (1992) ‡
- Langston Hughes: Great American Poet (1992)
- Satchel Paige: The Best Arm in Baseball (1992)
- Sojourner Truth: A Voice for Freedom (1992)
- Zora Neale Hurston: Writer and Storyteller (1992)
- The Royal Kingdoms of Ghana, Mali, and Songhay: Life in Medieval Africa, with Fredrick McKissack (1993)
- Black Diamond: The Story of the Negro Baseball Leagues, with Fredrick McKissack, Jr. (1994) ‡
- Christmas in the Big House, Christmas in the Quarters, with Fredrick McKissack (1994) ‡
- Rebels Against Slavery: American Slave Revolts, with Fredrick McKissack (1996) ‡
- Red-Tail Angels: The Story of the Tuskegee Airmen of World War II (1996)
- A Picture of Freedom: the Diary of Clotee, a Slave Girl Belmont Plantation, Virginia, 1858 (1997), Dear America series
- Ma Dear's Aprons (1997)
- Run Away Home (1997)
- Let My People Go: Bible Stories Told By A Freeman Of Color, with Fredrick McKissack (1998)
- Young, Black, and Determined, with Fredrick McKissack (1998)
- Black Hands, White Sails: The Story of African-American Whalers, with Fredrick McKissack (1999) ‡
- Nzingha: Warrior Queen of Matamba (2000), Royal Diaries series
- Color Me Dark: The Diary of Nellie Lee Love, The Great Migration North (2000), Dear America series
- Goin' Someplace Special (2000)
- The Honest-to-Goodness Truth (2000)
- Days Of Jubilee: The End of Slavery in the United States, with Fredrick McKissack (2002) ‡
- Itching and Twitching: A Nigerian Folktale, with Robert L. McKissack (2003)
- Tippy Lemmey (2003)
- Hard Labor: The First African Americans, 1619, with Fredrick McKissack, Jr. (2004)
- Look to the Hills: The Diary of Lozette Moreau, a French Slave Girl (2004), Dear America series
- Precious and the Boo Hag (2004)
- To Establish Justice: Citizenship and Constitution (2004)
- Abby Takes a Stand (2005)
- Where Crocodiles have Wings (2005)
- Scraps of Time: 1879, Away West (2006)
- Porch Lies: Tales of Slicksters, Tricksters, and Other Wily Characters (2006)
- A Friendship for Today (2007)
- The All-I'll-Ever-Want Christmas Doll (2007)
- A Song for Harlem (2007)
- Stitchin' and Pullin': A Gee's Bend Quilt (2008)
- The Clone Codes series, by John Patrick McKissack, Fredrick McKissack, and Patricia C. McKissack
  - The Clone Codes (2010)
  - Cyborg (2011)
  - The Visitor (2012)
- Best Shot in the West: The Adventures of Nat Love, with Fredrick McKissack, Jr., illus. Randy DuBurke (2011)
- Never Forgotten, illus. Leo and Diane Dillon (2011) ‡
- Ol' Clip-Clop: A Ghost Story (2013)
- Let's Clap, Jump, Sing & Shout; Dance, Spin & Turn It Out!: Games, Songs & Stories From An African American Childhood (2017)
- Who Will Bell the Cat?, illus. Christopher Cyr (2018)
- What is Given from the Heart, illus. April Harrison (2019)
