= Standing in the Light: The Captive Diary of Catherine Carey Logan =

1998 Dear American novel by Mary Pope Osborne

- Author: Mary Pope Osborne
- Series: Dear America
- Publisher: Scholastic
- Publication date: 1998
- ISBN: 0-590-13462-0

Standing in the Light: The Captive Diary of Catharine Carey Logan, is a Dear America novel written by American author Mary Pope Osborne, first published in 1998. The novel is set in Delaware Valley, Pennsylvania in 1763.

== Plot summary ==
Catherine was born to a Quaker family and has always lived a simple life. But when she and her brother are captured by Indians her whole world is turned upside down. She is adopted by an old woman and her daughter. The old woman lost her other daughter, Snow Bird, to measles. Initially, Catherine despises the Indians and is in anguish for her brother who was taken to live with another tribe. She yells at and insults the Indians, until she gets dreams of her brother indicating that he lives over the hill. She decided to climb it, but first she had to cross an icy river. the ice broke, and she was saved by a hunter named Snow Hunter. She discovers that he can speak English, and tells him of the dreams she had of her brother. The next day, Thomas was with her, but he was very sick. Catherine and the old woman nurse him back to health. Catherine and Thomas start to develop close bonds with Snow Hunter and the other Indians, Catherine especially. And then, one day the English attack their camp. They took Catherine and Thomas back to their original family, not knowing if Snow Hunter and the others are alive or not. This was especially hard for Catherine, because she had grown to love Snow Hunter. She felt estranged from her true family, and when her father read her diary, she still was miserable. She eventually adapted to her true life but never forgot her experiences with the Lenape.

== Main characters ==
- Catherine
- Snow Hunter
- Thomas
- Little Cloud
- White Owl
- Little One
- Mother
- Father
