= My Name Is America =

Children's novel series

My Name Is America is a series of historical novels published by Scholastic Press. Each book is written in the form of a journal of a fictional young man's life during an important event or time period in American history. Seen as a companion to Scholastic's Dear America series, it was primarily aimed at boys 9–12 years old. The series was discontinued in 2004.

== List of books ==
There are nineteen books in the original My Name is America series, which was published between 1998 and 2004. Scholastic launched the Dear America series in Fall 1996 as a series of "diaries of fictitious girls writing from various points in American history." After the initial success of the Dear America series, Scholastic introduced the My Name is America series, using the same formatting, "in an attempt to reach out to boy readers."

In March 2012, alongside the relaunch and re-release of several books in the Dear America series, ten books in the My Name is America series were also re-released. While the text of the books did not change, the titles of the re-releases were updated to include an additional phrase before the original titles.

List of My Name Is America books
Date (original)	Date (reprint)	Author	Reprint Title Addition	Title
September 1998	December 2012	Barry Denenberg	A True Patriot:	The Journal of William Thomas Emerson: A Revolutionary War Patriot, Boston, Massachusetts, 1774
September 1998	September 2012	Jim Murphy	On Enemy Soil:	The Journal of James Edmond Pease: A Civil War Union Soldier, Virginia, 1863
April 1999		Walter Dean Myers		The Journal of Joshua Loper: A Black Cowboy, The Chisholm Trail, 1871
June 1999	March 2012	Walter Dean Myers	We Were Heroes:	The Journal of Scott Pendleton Collins: A World War II Soldier, Normandy, France, 1944
September 1999	September 2013	William Durbin	Until the Last Spike:	The Journal of Sean Sullivan: A Transcontinental Railroad Worker, Nebraska and Points West, 1867
September 1999		Barry Denenberg		The Journal of Ben Uchida: Citizen 13559, Mirror Lake Internment Camp, California, 1942
April 2000	November 2013	Laurence Yep	Staking a Claim:	The Journal of Wong Ming-Chung: A Chinese Miner, California, 1852
July 2000		Ann Rinaldi		The Journal of Jasper Jonathan Pierce: A Pilgrim boy, Plymouth, 1620
September 2000	February 2014	Kathryn Lasky	Blazing West:	The Journal of Augustus Pelletier: Lewis and Clark Expedition, 1804
September 2000		William Durbin		The Journal of Otto Peltonen: A Finnish Immigrant, Hibbing, Minnesota, 1905
April 2001	January 2013	Walter Dean Myers	Down to the Last Out:	The Journal of Biddy Owens: The Negro Leagues, Birmingham, Alabama, 1948
June 2001	January 2014	Joseph Bruchac	On This Long Journey:	The Journal of Jesse Smoke: A Cherokee Boy, The Trail of Tears, 1838
November 2001	December 2021	Rodman Philbrick	Stay Alive:	The Journal of Douglas Allen Deeds: The Donner Party Expedition, 1846
April 2002		William Durbin		The Journal of C.J. Jackson: A Dust Bowl Migrant, Oklahoma to California, 1935
June 2002	June 2012	Ellen Emerson White	Into No Man's Land:	The Journal of Patrick Seamus Flaherty: United States Marine Corps, Khe Sanh, Vietnam, 1968
September 2002		Ellen Levine		The Journal of Jedediah Barstow: An Emigrant on the Oregon Trail, Overland, 1845
May 2003		Susan Campbell Bartoletti		The Journal of Finn Reardon: A Newsie, New York City, 1899
October 2003		Sid Hite		The Journal of Rufus Rowe: A Witness to the Battle of Fredericksburg, Bowling Green, Virginia, 1862
April 2004		Jim Murphy		The Journal of Brian Doyle: A Greenhorn on an Alaskan Whaling Ship, The Florence, 1874

== Reception ==
The series was generally well received by libraries, educators, and parents, for its accessible and engaging historical fiction. However some critics, such as Melissa Kay Thompson, felt the series reinforced national myths and whitewashed the nation's treatment of native communities.

== See also ==
- Dear America
- My America
- The Royal Diaries
