= Jenny Pausacker =

Australian author (born 1948)

- Born: 2 November 1948 (age 77) Adelaide, South Australia
- Occupation: Author, academic
- Genre: Children's literature, young adult fiction
- Years active: 1972–present
- Notable works: Mr Enigmatic; What Are Ya? Dancing on Knives

Jenny Pausacker (born 2 November 1948 in Adelaide) is an Australian author.

Pausacker won her first literary competition prize at the age of ten, shortly after the death of her father. She finished her first novel at the age of sixteen, whilst attending Methodist Ladies' College, Melbourne, though it was rejected. Pausacker went on to do a Bachelor of Arts with Honours at Melbourne University in 1969, and a Master of Arts in 1972. In 1972 her first book was published, a picture book entitled The Three Dragons. She lectured in children's literature at Flinders University from 1975 until she obtained her PhD in that field in 1981. Pausacker has lectured at five other Australian universities, and also at the University of Bristol and the University of British Columbia. She has published over sixty books for children and young adults, and also wrote reviews for The Australian for 5 years. She has written under the pen names Jaye Francis, Jade Forrester, Mary Forrest and Rosa Tomaselli.

Her book What Are Ya? was shortlisted for the 1998 Victorian Premier's Literary Award. Mr Enigmatic won the 1995 New South Wales Premier's Literary Award. Getting Somewhere, was short-listed for the Older Readers category of the 1996 Children's Book Council Awards, and The Rings was listed as a notable book at the 1998 Children's Book Council Awards. Dancing on Knives was shortlisted for the 2005 Ethel Turner Prize for Young People's Literature.
