= Kristiana Gregory =

American children's author (born 1951)

- Born: 1951 (age 74–75); Los Angeles, California, U.S.
- Other name: Lynn Christine

Kristiana Gregory (born 1951) is an American children's author.

Gregory grew up in a small town by the sea near Los Angeles with her parents and two younger siblings. Gregory is a popular author of children's historical fiction, including several for the Dear America and The Royal Diaries series. She lives in Idaho with her husband near her grown children.

Her book Jenny of the Tetons won the Golden Kite Award for Fiction and her Dear America diary Seeds of Hope: The Gold Rush Diary of Susanna Fairchild was named Best Book of the Year by Oppenheim Toy Portfolio. Two books were made into films. The first was Winter of Red Snow Dear America Journals and the second was originally written for The Royal Diaries series, Cleopatra VII, Daughter of the Nile, was made into an HBO Family Channel movie.

== Novels ==
- Jenny of the Tetons (1989)
- The Legend of Jimmy Spoon (1990)
- Earthquake at Dawn (1992)
- Jimmy Spoon and the Pony Express (1994)
- The Stowaway: A Tale of California Pirates (1995)
- The Winter of Red Snow: The Revolutionary War Diary of Abigail Jane Stewart, Valley Forge, Pennsylvania, 1777 (1996)
- Across the Wide and Lonesome Prairie: The Oregon Trail Diary of Hattie Campbell, 1847 (1997)
- Orphan Runaways (1998)
- The Great Railroad Race: The Diary of Libby West, Utah Territory, 1868 (1999)
- Cleopatra VII: Daughter of the Nile, Egypt, 57 B.C. (1999)
- Five Smooth Stones: Hope's Revolutionary War Diary, Book One (2000)
- Seeds of Hope: The Gold Rush Diary of Susanna Fairchild, California Territory, 1849 (2001)
- Eleanor: Crown Jewel of Aquitaine, France, 1136 (2002)
- We Are Patriots: Hope's Revolutionary War Diary, Book Two (2002)
- Prairie River #1: Journey of Faith, A (2003)
- Prairie River #2: Grateful Harvest, A (2003)
- Prairie River #3: Winter Tidings (2004)
- Prairie River #4: Hope Springs Eternal (2005)
- Catherine: The Great Journey, Russia, 1743 (2005)
- The Legend Of Skull Cliff
