= Heroes of Tobruk =

2006 novel by David Mulligan

- Author: David Mulligan
- Language: English
- Genre: Historical novel
- Publisher: Scholastic
- Publication date: 2006
- Publication place: Australia
- Media type: Print (Paperback)
- Pages: 196
- ISBN: 978-1-74169-077-4

Heroes of Tobruk is a young adult historical novel written by David Mulligan. It is set in Italian North Africa during World War II and was first published by Scholastic in 2008.

== Plot summary ==
The story follows Peter Fullerton and Tony Cantonelli's teen life as they illegally join the Australian army and are shipped off to the Siege of Tobruk. They soon become men as they experience heartfelt moments and feel much hurt throughout the story.
