= The Royal Diaries =

Fictional diaries of royal women as children (1999–2005)

The Royal Diaries is a series of 20 books published by Scholastic Press from 1999 to 2005. In each of the books, a fictional diary of a real female figure of royalty as a child throughout world history was written by the author. The Royal Diaries was a spin-off of Scholastic's popular Dear America series. While Dear America, My Name Is America, and My America were all cancelled in 2004, The Royal Diaries continued until 2005.

Unlike Dear America, which consisted of diaries of young girls living during pivotal periods in American history, The Royal Diaries is a series that features women of royalty from all over the world. The series is fictional, though it involves real historical figures. Facts and images concerning the historical figure featured in the book are given at the end of each of the books.

== Subjects ==
The Royal Diaries has covered many famous women in royalty, including Jahanara, Marie Antoinette, Eleanor of Aquitaine, Elizabeth I, Mary, Queen of Scots, Isabella I of Castile, Cleopatra VII, the Grand Duchess Anastasia Nikolaevna, Catherine the Great, Empress Elisabeth of Austria, and Queen Victoria. The series has also covered less known women, such as Queen Seondeok of Silla, Anacaona of the Taínos, Weetamoo of the Pocassets, the Lady of Ch'iao Kuo of the Hsien, the Lady of Palenque of the Mayans, and Nzingha of Ndongo. It also covers the life and customs of these women. The target age for these books is nine to twelve.

== List of books ==
List of The Royal Diaries books
Release date	Author	Title
1999	Kathryn Lasky	Elizabeth I: Red Rose of the House of Tudor, England, 1544
1999	Kristiana Gregory	Cleopatra VII: Daughter of the Nile, Egypt, 57 B.C.
2000	Carolyn Meyer	Isabel: Jewel of Castilla, Spain, 1466
2000	Kathryn Lasky	Marie Antoinette: Princess of Versailles, Austria-France 1769
2000	Carolyn Meyer	Anastasia: The Last Grand Duchess, Russia, 1914
2000	Patricia McKissack	Nzingha: Warrior Queen of Matamba, Angola, Africa, 1595
2001	Ellen Emerson White	Kaiulani: The People's Princess, Hawaii, 1889
2001	Laurence Yep	Lady of Ch'iao Kuo: Warrior of the South, Southern China, 531 A.D.
2001	Anna Kirwan	Victoria: May Blossom of Britannia, England, 1829
2002	Kathryn Lasky	Mary, Queen of Scots: Queen Without a Country, France, 1553
2002	Sheri Holman	Sŏndŏk: Princess of the Moon and Stars, Korea, 595 A.D.
2002	Kathryn Lasky	Jahanara: Princess of Princesses, India, 1627
2002	Kristiana Gregory	Eleanor: Crown Jewel of Aquitaine, France, 1136
2003	Barry Denenberg	Elisabeth: The Princess Bride, Austria-Hungary, 1853
2003	Carolyn Meyer	Kristina: The Girl King, Sweden, 1638
2003	Patricia Clark Smith	Weetamoo: Heart of the Pocassets, Massachusetts–Rhode Island, 1653
2004	Anna Kirwan	Lady of Palenque: Flower of Bacal, Mesoamerica, A.D. 749
2004	Kathryn Lasky	Kazunomiya: Prisoner of Heaven, Japan, 1858
2005	Edwidge Danticat	Anacaona: Golden Flower, Haiti, 1490
2005	Kristiana Gregory	Catherine: The Great Journey, Russia, 1743

== Television adaptations ==
Following the Dear America series, in 2000, HBO created three TV films based on three of the Royal Diaries books: Elizabeth I, Isabel, and Cleopatra VII. Reruns of these adaptations later aired on Qubo. As of November 2025, they are available to stream on Tubi and The Roku Channel.

In November 2021, it was reported that Legendary Television and Scholastic Entertainment were developing a new adaptation for television.

No.	Title	Directed by	Written by	Original release date
1	"Cleopatra: Daughter of the Nile"	Randy Bradshaw	Lori Lansens	September 9, 2000
Cast includes Elisa Moolecherry as Cleopatra, Hrant Alianak as Pharaoh, David Calderisi as Marcus Cicero, Linda Gizirian as Tryphaina, Matthew Witherly as Marc Antony, Jan Filips as Julius Caesar, Larissa Gomes as Berenice, and Yani Gellman as Olympus.
2	"Elizabeth I: Red Rose of the House of Tudor"	René Bonnière	Ann MacNaughton	November 4, 2000
Cast includes Tamara Hope as Elizabeth, Daniel Clark as Robin Dudley, Marion Day as Mary, Jefferson Mappin as King Henry, Jennifer Wigmore as Queen Catherine, and Susan Sheridan as Jane the Bald.
3	"Isabel: Jewel of Castilla"	William Fruet	Barbara O'Kelly	December 20, 2000
Cast includes Lisa Jakub as Isabel, Cara Pifko as Catalina Valera, Christopher Ralph as Fernando, Ken Staines as Juan Pacheco, and Barna Moncz as Alphonso.

== See also ==
- Dear America
- My America
- My Name is America
