= My Story (Scholastic UK) =

Series of historical novels for children

My Story is a series of historical novels for children published by Scholastic UK. They are similar to the Dear America series, each book is written in the form of the diary of a fictional young woman or man living during an important event in history. Most of the books feature British characters and history, but some are about non-British characters during important events and times in world history.

== My Story: Girls ==
- Princess of Egypt: The Diary of Asha 1490 BC by Vince Cross (2008)
  - Egyptian Princess (re-released 2009)
- Pompeii: The Diary of Claudia, Pompeii, AD 78 by Sue Reid (2008)
- My Tudor Queen: The Diary of Eva De Puebla, London, 1501 by Alison Prince (2001)
  - Catherine of Aragon (re-released 2010)
- Anne Boleyn and Me: The Diary of Elinor Valjean, London, 1525 by Alison Prince (2005)
  - Anne Boleyn and Me: A Tudor Girl's Diary, London, 1525 (re-released 2010)
- Lady Jane Grey, 1547 by Sue Reid (2012)
- Bloody Tower: The Diary of Matilda "Tilly" Middleton, London, 1553 by Valerie Wilding (2002)
  - Bloody Tower: The Diary of a Tudor Girl (re-released 2008)
- The Queen's Spies: The Diary of Catherine "Kitty" Lumsden, London, 1583–1586 by Valerie Wilding (2006)
  - To Kill a Queen (re-released 2008)
- Mayflower: The Diary of Remember Patience Whipple, 1620 by Kathryn Lasky (1996)
- The Great Plague: The Diary of Alice Paynton, London, 1665–1666 by Pamela Oldfield (2001)
  - The Great Plague An London Girl’s Diary 1665–1666 (re-release)
- Highway Girl An English Girl’s Diary, 1670 by Valerie Wilding (2008)
- The '45 Rising: The Diary of Euphemia Grant, Scotland, 1745–1746 by Francis Mary Hendry (2001)
- Transported: The Diary of Elizabeth Harvey, Sydney Cove, 1790 by Goldie Alexander (2002)
  - Australia (re-release) (This one is also in the My Australia Story series)
- No Way Back by Valerie Wilding (2012)
- The Fall of the Blade: A Young Aristocrat's Diary, 1792–1794 by Sue Ried (2010)
- Mill Girl: the diary of Eliza Helsted, Manchester, 1842–1843 by Sue Reid (2002)
  - Mill Girl, The Diary of a Victorian girl 1842–1843 (re-released 2008)
- The Hunger: The Diary of Phyllis McCormack, Ireland, 1845–1847 by Carol Drinkwater (2001)
  - The Hunger An Irish Girl's Diary 1845–1847 (re-release)
- The Crystal Palace: The Diary of Lily Hicks, London, 1850–1851 by Francis Mary Hendry (2001)
  - Young Nanny A Victorian Girl’s Diary, 1850 (re-released 2010)
- Slave Girl, The Diary of Clotee, Virginia, USA, 1859 by Patricia McKissack (1997)
  - Slave Girl, An African American Girl's Story, 1859 (re-release 2008)
- Victorian Workhouse: The Diary of Edith Lorriner, London, 1871 by Pamela Oldfield (2003)
  - Workhouse A Victorian Girl’s Diary, 1871 (re-released 2008)
- Factory Girl by Pamela Oldfield (2011)
- Twentieth Century Girl: The Diary of Flora Bonnington, London, 1900 by Carol Drinkwater (2001)
  - 1900: A Brand-New Century A London Girl’s Diary 1899–1900 (re-released, 2010)
- Suffragette: The Diary of Dollie Baxton, London, 1901–1913 by Carol Drinkwater (2003)
  - Suffragette (re-released 2011)
- Titanic: The Diary of Margaret Anne Brady, RMS Titanic, 1912 by Ellen Emerson White (1998)
  - Titanic A Edwardian Girl’s Diary, 1912 (re-released 2008)
- Road to War A First World War Girl's Diary, 1917 by Valerie Wilding (2007)
- Berlin Olympics: Olympic Swimmer, 1936 by Vince Cross (2012)
- Wartime Princess by Valerie Wilding (2012)
- Nowhere to Run A Second World War Refugee's Diary, 1938–1943 by Carol Drinkwater (2012)
- Sophie's Secret War A Second World War Girl’s Diary 1939–1940 by Jill Atkin (2008)
- War Nurse: The Diary of Kitty Langley, Dunkirk, 1939–1940 by Sue Reid (2005)
  - War Nurse A Second World War Girl’s Diary, 1939–1940 (re-released 2009)
- Blitz: The Diary of Edie Benson, London, 1940–1941 by Vince Cross (2001)
  - Blitz: A Wartime Girl 1940–1941 (re-released 2008)

== My Story: Boys ==
- Pyramid of Secrets: Pharaoh Khafra, Egypt, 2554BC by Jim Eldridge (2010)
- Roman Invasion: A British Boy, AD 84 by Jim Eldridge (2008)
- Viking Blood: A Viking Warrior, 1006 AD by Andrew Donkin (2008)
- Agincourt: Jenkin Lloyd, France, 1415 by Michael Cox (2003)
- Armada: The Story of Thomas Hobbs, England, 1587–1588 by Jim Eldridge (2002)
- Civil War: Thomas Adamson, England, 1644 by Vince Cross (2002)
- Trafalgar: James Grant, HMS Norseman 1799–1806 by Bryan Perrett (2002)
- Waterloo: Bob Jenkins, Royal House Artillery, 1814–1817 by Bryan Perrett (2003)
- Crimea: The Story of Michael Pope, 110th Regiment, 1853–1857 by Bryan Perrett (2004)
- Indian Mutiny: Hanuman Singh, India, 1857–1858 by Pratima Mitchell (2002)
- Sweep's Boy: A Victorian Boy, London, 1870 by Jim Eldridge (2010)
- Zulu War: Jabulani, Africa, 1879–1882 by Vince Cross (2002)
- The Trenches: Billy Stevens, the Western Front, 1914–1918 by Jim Eldridge (2002)
  - The Trenches: A First World War Soldier, 1914–1918 (2008 re-release)
- Flying Ace: Jack Fairfax, Royal Flying Corps, 1915–1918 by Jim Eldridge (2003)
- The Storm to Come, Vienna, 1939 by Yankev Glatshteyn (2010)
- U-Boat Hunter: Peter Rogers, HMS Arum, 1939–1945 by Bryan Perrett (2005)
- Battle of Britain: Harry Woods, England 1939–1941 by Chris Priestley (2002)
  - Battle of Britain: A Second World War Spitfire Pilot, 1939–1941 (2008 re-release)
- Spy Smuggler: Paul Lelaud, France, 1942–1944 by Jim Eldridge (2004)
- Desert Danger: Tim Jackson, North Africa, WWII by Jim Eldridge (2005)
  - Desert Danger (re-released 2012)
- D-Day: Lieutenant Andy Pope, Normandy, 1944 by Bryan Perrett (2004)
  - D-Day: A Second World War Soldier, 1944 (2009 re-release)

== See also ==
- Dear America
- Dear Canada
- I Am Canada
- My Australian Story
- My Story (New Zealand)
- My Royal Story
