= List of The Real Ghostbusters episodes =

The Real Ghostbusters Complete Collection DVD box set, released in North America by Time-Life on November 15, 2008.

The animated television series The Real Ghostbusters premiered on ABC on September 13, 1986. It continued airing weekly until the series conclusion on October 5, 1991. After the first season aired, the series entered syndication with its second season, during which new episodes aired each weekday. 65 episodes aired in syndication simultaneously with the third season in 1987. At the start of the fourth season in 1988, the show was renamed to Slimer! and the Real Ghostbusters and expanded to an hour-long time slot, during which the regular 30-minute episode aired along with a half-hour Slimer! sub-series which included two to three short animated segments focused on the character Slimer and returned to ABC. At the end of its seven-season run, 173 episodes had aired, including 13 episodes of Slimer!, with multiple episodes airing out of production order.

Sony Pictures Entertainment released several DVD volumes of the show in North America in 2006. They include random episodes and no extras. Time-Life released the complete series in a single 25-disc box-set collection on November 25, 2008. The discs were packed in five plastic or steelbook volumes, housed in a box modeled on the Ghostbusters' firehouse, a design chosen in a fan vote. Beginning the next year, the separate volumes were released on their own, first in the United States. Sony only released a 2-disc set featuring all 13 episodes from Season 1 in Australia and the UK.

Sony later released most of the series on individual disc volumes in 2016 (the first 5 volumes were also made available in a boxed bundle). In October 2017, the entire collection of all 10 volumes was released in a 10-disc box set. It was not complete as 29 episodes, or approximately 20% of the series, was omitted. No extras were included, and several episodes were modified in that their opening title cards were removed. Some of this box set's missing episodes from earlier seasons are found on Sony's 2006 (out-of-print) DVD releases.

Every episode of the series (including Slimer! and the Real Ghostbusters) was released in 2018 through both a 21-disc DVD and 3-disc Blu-ray (non upscaled transfers) by German distributor Turbine, including both English and German audio tracks.

With the exception of the syndicated episodes, all the others are arranged in airing order. The events of episodes would later be adapted as comic books and video games.

== Series overview ==
Season	Episodes	Originally released		
Season	Episodes	First released	Last released	Network
1	13	September 13, 1986	December 13, 1986	ABC
2	65	September 14, 1987	December 11, 1987	Syndication
3	13	September 12, 1987	December 12, 1987	ABC
Slimer!	33	September 10, 1988	December 3, 1988	ABC
4	8	September 10, 1988	December 3, 1988	ABC
5	21	September 9, 1989	December 23, 1989	ABC
6	16	September 8, 1990	November 24, 1990	ABC
7	4	September 7, 1991	October 5, 1991	ABC
Crossover		April 21, 1990		ABC; NBC; Fox; CBS; USA Network; Syndication

== Episodes ==
=== The Real Ghostbusters ===
==== Season 1 (1986; ABC Season 1) ====
No. overall	No. in season	Title	Directed by	Written by	Original air date	Prod. code
1	1	"Ghosts R Us"	Richard Raynis	Len Janson; Chuck Menville	September 13, 1986	75002
It's business as usual when the Ghostbusters entrap a family of Class Fives - an irritable dad, a doting mom and a dumb baby. When Slimer tries to sneak some food without permission, he accidentally ensures that the Class Fives' stay won't even last through the night. The newly-freed family are now out for one thing - revenge. Soon enough, Ghosts 'R Us hits the scene and their "successes" make the guys look second-rate at every turn. The Ghostbusters may soon be out of business, but when the ghost family attempts to finish the job, they unleash a force that endangers all of New York City. Note: In the original (ABC) airing of Season 1, each episode ended with a green DiC vortex logo with the byline "Produced In Association With", followed by a CPT logo with the byline "A Unit of the Coca-Cola Company". The first note of the CPT logo would overlap with the final note of the end credits theme. Note: The title card and start-of-Act 2 bumper were silent, and only had Arsenio Hall's voice-over in this episode. Afterwards, the former began using a 7-note jingle, trimmed from one of the music cues, and the latter had a 9-note jingle. These would also be used during the second (ABC) season. Note: Also exists in a re-dubbed version with Dave Coulier and Kath Soucie as Peter and Janine, respectively. This version first aired in 1988.
2	2	"Killerwatt"	Richard Raynis	Len Janson; Chuck Menville	September 20, 1986	75001
An electric ghost named Killerwatt (James Avery) has taken over the power plant, leaving New York City powerless. Note: This was the first episode to be produced, after the 4-minute pilot was successfully sold to ABC and local stations.
3	3	"Mrs. Roger's Neighborhood"	Richard Raynis	Len Janson; Chuck Menville	September 27, 1986	75004
After a week-long lull, the Ghostbusters get a case - and to a haunted house, no less. Ray takes the house's occupants - Mrs. Rogers and her pet bird - back to the firehouse for their own safety, while the others inspect the area. A variety of increasingly bizarre happenings do occur and Egon attributes it all to Watt, a powerful demon, disguised as a kindly old lady who traps the Ghostbusters in a haunted house while it infiltrates the firehouse and attempts to break open the containment unit. The situation proves worse than they would've imagined, however, as Watt has a bigger plan than a mere haunting. He possesses Peter in order to break open the containment unit. Note: Also exists in a re-dubbed version with Dave Coulier and Kath Soucie as Peter and Janine, respectively. This version first aired in 1988.
4	4	"Slimer, Come Home"	Richard Raynis	J. Michael Straczynski	October 4, 1986	75006
After being yelled at by Peter, Slimer runs away and gets mixed up with some very mean poltergeists. The ghosts' leader then tries to absorb Slimer and hundreds of other ghosts into himself, making him invincible. Note: Also exists in a re-dubbed version with Dave Coulier and Kath Soucie as Peter and Janine, respectively. This version first aired in 1988.
5	5	"Troll Bridge"	Richard Raynis	Bruce Reid Schaeffer	October 11, 1986	75007
A young troll leaves his tribe, goes exploring and ends up in New York. While he has a good time, his tribe takes over the bridge and threatens to destroy the city if he isn't returned by sundown, using a group of flying, fire-breathing birds. The Ghostbusters have a hard time catching the troll, but when they do, they can't stand to separate the party animal from the city. Instead, they convince the other trolls he was turned into a statue when their proton stream hit him. While the other trolls leave, the Ghostbusters send the young troll to a friend out of town. Note: Also exists in a re-dubbed version with Dave Coulier and Kath Soucie as Peter and Janine, respectively. This version first aired in 1988.
6	6	"The Boogieman Cometh"	Richard Raynis	Michael Reaves	October 18, 1986	75008
Meghan and Kenny Carter (Susan Blu) are being scared by the Boogieman and go to the Ghostbusters for help. The children's parents aren't happy when the Ghostbusters barge into their homes in the middle of the night and ask them to leave. To make things even better, Egon knows the Boogieman from childhood, and convinces the guys to go after him. But in order to stop him, they'll have to find another way to get to the Boogieman, which leads them to a showdown in his realm. Note: Also exists in a re-dubbed version with Dave Coulier and Kath Soucie as Peter and Janine, respectively. This version first aired in 1988.
7	7	"Mr. Sandman, Dream Me a Dream"	Richard Raynis	J. Michael Straczynski	October 25, 1986	75009
All over New York, people are falling asleep and their dreams are becoming reality. A rogue Sandman has plans to put everyone to sleep in order to bring peace to the world, despite the fact that they will be asleep for 500 years. Egon realizes how to beat him, but falls sleep before he can say it. One by one, Ray, Peter and Egon are put to sleep, until only Winston is left. Knowing that he can't stop the Sandman alone, Winston tries to figure out what Egon had realized, but couldn't say. It is only with the help of Albert Einstein (from Egon's dream) that Winston is able to figure out what to do. He returns to the firehouse, where he tells Janine his plan. Janine falls under the Sandman's spell and falls asleep as Winston is cornered by the Sandman. In Janine's dream, she transforms herself into a Ghostbuster as she hits the Sandman from behind and, with the help of Slimer, traps him. Note: Also exists in a re-dubbed version with Dave Coulier and Kath Soucie as Peter and Janine, respectively. This version first aired in 1988.
8	8	"When Halloween Was Forever"	Richard Raynis	J. Michael Straczynski	November 1, 1986	75010
Samhain (William E. Martin), the spirit of Halloween, is released from his centuries-old prison and seeks to make Halloween last forever by stopping time, forcing Ghostbusters to prevent eternal Halloween.
9	9	"Look Homeward, Ray"	Richard Raynis	Marc Scott Zicree	November 8, 1986	75003
For once, Ray is asked to be in a parade in his hometown, but his homecoming is far from pleasant when a jealous rival tries to make him look bad by casting ghostly spells. However, the spells ultimately backfire, releasing a gigantic flying, fire-breathing puma upon his hometown, and only the Real Ghostbusters can stop it. Egon is as serious as ever (at least he isn't possessed again).
10	10	"Take Two"	Richard Raynis	J. Michael Straczynski	November 15, 1986	75011
Get ready for Hollywood makes blockbuster about the Ghostbusters. The advisors to the project are the guys themselves, and Slimer joins them on their flight to Hollywood. Tinsel Town may not be ready for the resulting antics, but bigger problems await. The studio turns out to be the home to a ghost that demands total peace and quiet, and it has just woken up. Even worse, workers mistake the proton packs for props and place them in storage without the Ghostbusters' knowledge. When the ghost possesses a giant robot prop and begins an attack, the guys find themselves completely defenseless.
11	11	"Citizen Ghost"	Richard Raynis	J. Michael Straczynski	November 22, 1986	75012
Peter tells reporter Cynthia Crawford (Julie Bennett) the story of what happened to the Ghostbusters after they defeated Gozer. While rebuilding their headquarters and Ecto-Containment Unit, the group is forced to deal with a certain green ghost from the Sedgwick Hotel (which Ray named Slimer). But having the green ghost constantly hanging around them is nothing compared to the trouble they have when a group of evil ghostly doubles decide to take their place by getting rid of the original Ghostbusters.
12	12	"Janine's Genie"	Richard Raynis	Len Janson; Chuck Menville	December 6, 1986	75005
Janine accompanies the Ghostbusters on a job and accepts an old lamp as part of the payment. A genie (Charlie Adler) happens to be inside the lamp and he grants her wishes (the first making her the boss and the second making Egon love her). However, the genie is also opening a gateway to let many ghosts enter the real world.
13	13	"Xmas Marks the Spot"	Richard Raynis	J. Michael Straczynski	December 13, 1986	75013
On the way back to the firehouse on Christmas Eve, the Ghostbusters unknowingly stumble through a portal to the past and into 19th-century Britain, where they run into Ebenezer Scrooge (Peter Renaday) and capture the three Ghosts of Christmas. The Ghostbusters return to the present, find Christmas destroyed and quickly realize what happened. Without the three Ghosts of Christmas, Scrooge never learned his lesson and destroyed Christmas. Now the Ghostbusters must make sure that Scrooge learns his lesson, while Egon plunges into the Ecto-Containment Unit to rescue the three spirits and return them to the past to rehabilitate Scrooge before the portal to the past closes.

==== Season 2 (1987; Syndication Season) ====
For this season, episodes are listed in order of production code, rather than air date.

No. overal	No. in season	Title	Directed by	Written by	Original air date	Prod. code
14	1	"Knock, Knock"	Masakazu Higuchi	J. Michael Straczynski	November 6, 1987	76001
When a group of subway construction workers accidentally uncover an ancient door that isn't meant to be opened up until doomsday, their persistence accidentally triggers the door's opening, which sends incredible amounts of poltergeist energy surging through the New York subway system, mutating the trains into worm-like monsters. The Ghostbusters are called in to deal with it, and Egon discovers that if they don't close the door soon, the entire world will be transformed into a twisted and barren wasteland of ghostly and demonic creatures that will replace all of humankind and civilization. Note 1: One of the differences between the ABC and Syndicated episodes was that the crew had more freedom with certain storylines and villains on the latter, that would have been vetoed by the network, due to their strict protocols. Note 2: First released on video by RCA/Columbia's Magic Window division on October 22, 1986. Note 3: This is the only syndicated episode to have a silent title card, different from the others in this season. The others used an alternate jingle, different from the one used in the first two ABC seasons. Note 4: "THE REAL GHOSTBUSTERS is available on MAGIC WINDOW Videocassettes from RCA/Columbia Pictures Home Video. Original Soundtrack Album Available on Polydor Records, Tapes and Compact Disc". This tagline only appeared on the syndicated episodes' closing credits. Note 5: Much like the first ABC season, all syndicated episodes carried a 1986 copyright date, as they were produced during that year. Fewest episodes in their original airing used the DIC choir variant kid in bed logo. Some episodes used the DIC green vortex/CPT logo (with the latter freeze-framed after the last note of the fanfare), others used the DIC kid in bed (warp-speed variant)/Coca-Cola Telecommunications logo. Arsenio Hall (Winston) does the voice of the NO GHOST in the bumpers, and the episode title is silent. Subsequent syndicated episodes used an 8-note jingle, trimmed from one of the commercial bumper cues. The closing theme music continues to play over the DIC kid in bed Logo with the "In Association With" tagline in some prints. It is a rare variant in this episode, as usually it is only reserved for the DIC green vortex logo. Note 6: This episode originally ended with the DIC green vortex/CPT logo.
15	2	"Station Identification"	Masakazu Higuchi	Marc Scott Zicree	December 9, 1987	76002
Ghosts with plans for world domination create a TV station as part of their scheme. Manifesting as various television characters and commercial products, the ghosts can travel through any television in the city to terrorize the public. The Ghostbusters try to stop these ghosts, but when Slimer gets captured by the ghosts, it's up to the guys to get him back and make sure the ghost station does not go nationwide, and then worldwide. Note: This episode originally ended with the warp-speed DIC kid in bed/Coca-Cola Telecommunications logo.
16	3	"Play Them Ragtime Boos"	Masakazu Higuchi	Michael Reaves; Steve Perry	November 26, 1987	76003
A ghostly bayou trumpet player, Malachi, is living - sort of - in the past, and seeks to turn back the clock by playing a haunting rendition of "When the Saints Go Marching In". Ghostbusters, with help from a bewitching mambo, try to fight this time-warping menace. Note 1: First released on video by RCA/Columbia's Magic Window division in the fall of 1986. Note 2: This episode originally ended with the DIC green vortex/CPT logo.
17	4	"Sea Fright"	Masakazu Higuchi	Arthur Byron Cover; Lydia Marano	November 10, 1987	76004
When a treasure-seeker uncovers a treasure chest on the ocean floor, he unwittingly summons a ship of pirate ghosts, who wreak havoc on New York in order to reclaim their treasure. The ship, called The Stag, is commanded by Captain Jack Higgins (Jack Angel), one of the most notorious pirates in history, whose pirates prove to be too much for the Ghostbusters to handle. Despite being outnumbered, the Ghostbusters give chase to the pirates in order to stop them. To make things worse, Slimer tries to help, and gets into a fight with a ghost parrot, while the guys take on Higgins and his pirates, ambushing The Stag first from another land-beached ship, and then leading the pirates into a trap so that they can end their plundering once and for all. Note: This episode originally ended with the DIC green vortex/CPT logo.
18	5	"The Spirit of Aunt Lois"	Masakazu Higuchi	Richard Mueller	November 9, 1987	76005
Ray's Aunt Lois (Marilyn Lightstone) hires a phony psychic to get rid of ghosts in her house, much to the Ghostbusters' dismay. Instead of helping, though, this phony psychic enrages the ghosts, who are, in fact, protective house spirits called domoviye, even more, causing them to throw a nasty temper tantrum. Note: This episode originally ended with the DIC green vortex/CPT logo.
19	6	"Cry Uncle"	Masakazu Higuchi	Bruce Reid Schaeffer	November 12, 1987	76006
It is not suitable for a Spengler to be anything as unscientific as a Ghostbuster, at least in the eyes of Egon's Uncle Cyrus (Danny Wells). Egon has to reluctantly go back to the Midwest, over 1,500 miles from New York, and feed mice at the Spengler Labs, but the Ghostbusters will try anything to convince Uncle Cyrus that there actually are such things as ghosts. But things get out of hand when Uncle Cyrus unwittingly lets the Stay Puft Marshmallow Man out of the containment unit, and the Ghostbusters have to put him back before he destroys the city again. Note 1: First released on video by RCA/Columbia's Magic Window division as a special prize in select Ghostbusters cereal boxes in the fall of 1986. Note 2: This episode originally ended with the DIC green vortex/CPT logo.
20	7	"Adventures in Slime and Space"	Masakazu Higuchi	David Gerrold	September 15, 1987	76007
One of Egon's contraptions has a bad effect on Slimer, making millions of little versions of the green ghost. Worse, when they try to fix the problem, Slimer turns evil and starts causing trouble across the entire city, which ends up slimed to great excess. The episode itself is infamous for its numerous in-jokes such as Pac-Man, 2001: A Space Odyssey, King Kong, The Three Stooges, Howard the Duck, and even Star Trek and Adventures in Time and Space. Note: This episode originally ended with the warp-speed choir DIC kid in bed/Coca-Cola Telecommunications logo.
21	8	"Night Game"	Masakazu Higuchi	Kathryn M. Drennan	September 22, 1987	76008
Winston and Slimer go to the Jaguars baseball stadium to see them play. There, Winston witnesses a supernatural event and tries, unsuccessfully, to convince the guys to investigate. Winston's research into the event leads to an old Native American legend that involves an ancient battle between the forces of Good and Evil that takes place once every 500 years. When Winston becomes trapped in the stadium during the ghostly takeover, the guys go to rescue him. However, when they get inside, they find two supernatural forces playing baseball instead of fighting. According to Winston, the two forces choose their method of battle based on their surroundings, which is now housing a baseball stadium. What's more, the two groups are playing for a single human soul. If Good loses, the soul must spend 500 years doing Evil's bidding. The umpire, who seems to be the judge for this contest, has allowed Winston to play on the side of Good since he was there when the battle began, and allows the Ghostbusters to remain and watch. Peter thinks that they are playing for Winston's soul, and that they have to help the good guys win this contest. However, Egon points out that if they try to interfere, Good will lose, and Winston will lose his soul. Winston is the last up to bat for the side of Good, and faces off against a mammoth pitcher with a cannon-trunk for a pitching arm. Winston manages to hit the last ball, scoring a home run and winning the game. The umpire then reveals that the whole thing was a test, that the Ghostbusters had to decide whether or not to interfere and let Good win on its own terms. But Winston reveals the biggest secret of all, that they were not playing for his soul, but Peter's, and that's why they let Winston play. Note 1: First released on video by RCA/Columbia's Magic Window division in the spring of 1987, along with "The Bird of Kildarby" and "Lost and Foundry". Note 2: This episode originally ended with the DIC green vortex/CPT logo.
22	9	"Venkman's Ghost Repellers"	Masakazu Higuchi	Richard Mueller	October 20, 1987	76009
Peter's conman father sells a product that he claims acts as a ghost repellent. However, the products, which are actually plain and ordinary ponchos, prove to be useless against a ghost as simple as Slimer. Worse, when the Ghostbusters try to convince Peter's dad to stop selling them, due to the fact it is fraudulent and amoral, he sells them anyway to a science expedition that is out to investigate the New Jersey Parallelogram, apparently a 'smaller, nastier version' of the Bermuda Triangle, then the expedition gets trapped in the Parallelogram. Peter's father, thinking he may be responsible, goes to locate them at the same time the Coast Guard contracts the Ghostbusters to help them locate the missing ship. When the Ghostbusters and Coast Guard get pulled into the Parallelogram, they eventually find the ship and are able to get it out. Once out, they find Peter's father's speedboat, but he is not there. The boys go back into the Parallelogram in order to locate Peter's dad, finding him at the center of the supernatural structure battling a horde of ghosts. Their fight to save Peter's father results in damaging the center of the Parallelogram, and the Ghostbusters barely manage to escape before the entire structure collapses into the ocean. Peter's father later sends Peter a postcard from Alaska, letting him know that he's now got a job selling iceboxes to the natives. Note 1: First released on video by RCA/Columbia's Magic Window division in the fall of 1986. Note 2: This episode originally ended with the DIC green vortex/CPT logo.
23	10	"The Old College Spirit"	Masakazu Higuchi	John Shirley	November 27, 1987	76010
Peter's old college fraternity asks for help from the Ghostbusters to bust a gang of ghosts on campus. Apparently, their frat is being framed for numerous crimes by a gang of ghostly delinquents who, several decades ago and when they were still alive, swore revenge against the college for expelling them. The gang of spirit-hooligans vastly outnumber the Ghostbusters, but the Ghostbusters find out that the gang has one weakness: they want to graduate. Note: This episode originally ended with the DIC green vortex/CPT logo.
24	11	"Ain't NASA-Sarily So"	Masakazu Higuchi	Craig Miller; Mark Nelson	November 17, 1987	76011
The crew of a newly-created space platform calls the Ghostbusters for assistance in ridding them of a power-sucking ghost – a crew that oddly resembles that of another spacecraft on a five-year mission. Note: This episode originally ended with the warp-speed DIC kid in bed/Coca-Cola Telecommunications logo. Absent: Janine Melnitz & Slimer
25	12	"Who're You Calling Two-Dimensional?"	Masakazu Higuchi	J. Michael Straczynski	September 24, 1987	76012
Strange noises emanating from the room that legendary animator, Walt Fleishman (Don Messick), used to animate his characters until his disappearance in the 1940s prompts an old lady working at the studio to contact the Ghostbusters. The Ghostbusters enter a cartoon world, where they meet the one and only Dopey Dog. Note: This episode originally ended with the DIC green vortex/CPT logo.
26	13	"A Fright at the Opera"	Masakazu Higuchi	Mark Edward Edens	October 26, 1987	76013
The Ghostbusters confront Valkyrie ghosts that have been terrorizing an opera. While there, Peter starts up a romance with the opera's diva. There, they also meet the Phantom of the Opera (who apparently summoned the Valkyries in the first place). Note 1: First released on video by RCA/Columbia's Magic Window division in the fall of 1986. Note 2: This episode originally ended with the DIC green vortex/CPT logo. Absent: Janine Melnitz & Slimer
27	14	"Doctor, Doctor"	Masakazu Higuchi	J. Michael Straczynski	October 13, 1987	76014
The Ghostbusters have to go to the hospital after a job at a chemical plant. The bust at the plant causes a strange chemical to cover the guys, which results in a thick layer of slime and muck to cover everything but their heads. What's more, the slime seems to react to Slimer in a very unusual way, and the doctors at the hospital are less than helpful in dealing with something they have never seen before. The Ghostbusters eventually realize that the slime is actually part of the ghost they tried to bust at the chemical plant, and that it needs ectoplasm to survive, which it why it goes after Slimer. Now the guys have to save Slimer before he is eaten. Note: This episode originally ended with the warp-speed DIC kid in bed/Coca-Cola Telecommunications logo.
28	15	"Ghost Busted"	Masakazu Higuchi	Michael Reaves	October 22, 1987	76015
When a dry season of ghostbusting puts financial stress on the guys and Janine, the group tries to compensate by taking side jobs, much to their own disaster. Things change when the guys bust a criminal, and decide to go into business as the Crimebusters. Within a very short time the guys have busted every criminal in New York, adjusting their proton packs and ghost traps to trap and contain criminals. However, their actions anger the head Mafia boss in New York, called Crimelord (Hamilton Camp), who takes Janine hostage to force them to give up. The guys track down the kidnappers and rescue Janine, and Peter uses Slimer to force the thugs to tell them where Crimelord is. Using Ecto-2, the guys go after Crimelord and finally manage to chase him down, impaling his own helicopter on the Empire State building after a lengthy chase. With all the criminals in the city locked up, the Crimebusters are once again out of business, as the ghosts decide to come back, including Stay Puft Marshmallow Man before the episode ends. Note: This episode originally ended with the DIC green vortex/CPT logo.
29	16	"Beneath These Streets"	Masakazu Higuchi	Richard Mueller; Daniel Pitlik	November 25, 1987	76016
Ray goes into the sewer to find out what's causing earthquakes and heat waves in the city. What he finds is an ancient and mysterious pillar that is holding up all of Manhattan Island. Worse, the ghosts have disrupted the axle grease that keeps the pillar turning and holding up the island, in order to get it to break and eventually sink the island into the sea. The Ghostbusters go after Ray in order not only to save him from the ghosts, but also to prevent the pillar from being destroyed. Note: This episode originally ended with the DIC green vortex/CPT logo.
30	17	"Boo-Dunit"	Masakazu Higuchi	Dennys McCoy; Pamela Hickey	October 30, 1987	76017
As ghosts are acting out an incomplete mystery, Winston is in charge of finishing and solving it. But at the end of the episode, because Winston spoils the endings whenever the Ghostbusters watch mystery movies, he is tied up. Note: This episode originally ended with the DIC green vortex/CPT logo.
31	18	"Chicken, He Clucked"	Masakazu Higuchi	J. Michael Straczynski	October 19, 1987	76018
A chicken-fearing man named Cubby finally has a breakdown and uses a trio of magic books from the New York Public library, which Egon was also looking to check out, to summon up a demon named Morgannan (and his imp) in order to get rid of all the chickens in the world. Despite the ridiculous request, Morgannan gives Cubby the power to make anything disappear or reappear. Cubby then uses the power to make all the chickens in the world disappear, which brings the Ghostbusters running to investigate. However, when they confront Cubby about it, they get teleported into another dimension where the chickens are. They begin falling fast towards the rocky ground as the chickens are floating above them, but are saved from a very nasty crash into the ground by Morgannan, who has been so humiliated by Cubby's actions that he enlists the guys to help him undo the deal. The demon sends them back to the firehouse, where the Ghostbusters make a gaggle of robotic chickens to trick Cubby into returning the real chickens to Earth. Once the chickens are returned, Morgannan breaks the contract, removing Cubby's powers. The guys take Cubby and put him into a mental hospital, where Morgannan tortures Cubby with his least favorite food chicken. Note: This episode originally ended with the DIC green vortex/CPT logo.
32	19	"Ragnarok and Roll"	Masakazu Higuchi	J. Michael Straczynski	September 16, 1987	76019
Abandoned by his girlfriend Cindy (Lynn Ann Leveridge), a lonely man named Jeremy and his hunchbacked friend, DyTillio, sets loose the forces of evil as he uses a magical flute to bring about the end of the world in Norse mythology. However, DyTillio and Jeremy's ex-girlfriend manage to convince him to undo his destruction, which the evil force that Jeremy contracted with refuses to allow, and nearly kills him. The Ghostbusters are able to push the spirit back into his dark realm after Jeremy weakens it, and help Jeremy to reverse the damage he's done to the world, by using their own energies to repair the damaged flute. Note: This episode originally ended with the warp-speed DIC kid in bed/Coca-Cola Telecommunications logo.
33	20	"Don't Forget the Motor City"	Masakazu Higuchi	Dennys McCoy; Pamela Hickey	December 3, 1987	76020
When Peter gets a new car, it suddenly and unexpectedly blows up. The Ghostbusters are then summoned to investigate malfunctioning equipment in a Detroit factory where the cars came from; they discover that gremlins, who have been left over from World War II, are messing with the plant's equipment. In order to defeat the gremlins, since their weapons only work on ghosts, the Ghostbusters create a special vehicle that the gremlins cannot resist. Note: This episode originally ended with the warp-speed DIC kid in bed/Coca-Cola Telecommunications logo.
34	21	"Banshee Bake a Cherry Pie?"	Masakazu Higuchi	Pamela Hickey; Dennys McCoy	October 28, 1987	76021
Peter's favorite rock-star singer Shanna O'Callahan arrives in New York and turns out to be a banshee, an Irish spirit whose voice causes chaos. She is now planning to use a major rock concert to broadcast her chaotic spell across the nation, and then, the world. When the Ghostbusters go to confront her, Peter falls under her siren spell, which complicates matters for the team. Note: This episode originally ended with the DIC green vortex/CPT logo. Absent: Janine Melnitz
35	22	"Who's Afraid of the Big Bad Ghost"	Masakazu Higuchi	Lydia Marano; Arthur Byron Cover	October 9, 1987	76022
During a routine ghostbust in the city, the Ghostbusters take down a bunch of ghosts at a restaurant, where a young couple are talking about getting rid of a ghost in their own mansion. The man, named John, suggests that they hire the guys for the job, but the woman, Olivia, refuses. Winston gives John one of their business cards before they go. At the mansion, when the pair try to scare the ghost of Olivia's Uncle Horace away, John loses the card that Winston gave him, and Horace himself uses it to call the Ghostbusters to scare away the other two ghosts so that he can find what he lost. Another ghost (that escaped from the restaurant the guys were busting) causes trouble in the mansion. When the Ghostbusters arrive, they mistakenly try to bust Horace, who is unaware of the fact that he has now become a ghost. After convincing the guys not to bust him, Egon's PKE meter detects the other ghost, and the guys go after him, only to find that it has taken Olivia hostage. Egon uses a Tarzanesque move to rescue Olivia as the Ghostbusters trap the rogue spook. Horace, now reunited with Olivia, finally remembers that it was his niece he was searching for. Finally able to say good-bye, Horace passes on peacefully, and both John and Olivia thank the Ghostbusters for their help. Note: This episode originally ended with the DIC green vortex/CPT logo. Absent: Slimer
36	23	"Hanging By a Thread"	Masakazu Higuchi	William Rotsler; Richard Mueller	December 10, 1987	76023
A demon (Lewis Arquette) and his legion of minions seek to steal the Shears of Fate, possessed by the Three Fates who determine the life of humans, in order to control the lives of all mortals. The Fates send the Shears into time and space in order to keep them out of the demon's hands. However, the Shears eventually fall into the hands of the Ghostbusters, causing the demons to invade New York in order to locate the Shears. After they attack the firehouse, the Shears fall into the hands of the demons, and the Three Fates recruit the Ghostbusters to retrieve the Shears from the demons. But in order to do that, they must go into the Underworld. Worse, they only have an hour to locate the Shears and return to the spot they were sent to, otherwise they will be trapped in the Underworld forever. With the help of Charon, the ferryman of the River Styx, the Ghostbusters locate the Shears and battle the demons in a pitched fight to get back to their rendezvous point. The boys barely make it, and return the Shears to the Three Fates. Note: This episode originally ended with the DIC green vortex/CPT logo.
37	24	"You Can't Take It With You"	Masakazu Higuchi	Durnie King; Richard Mueller	October 14, 1987	76024
Wishing to take his vast fortune with him to the afterlife, a dying and insanely avaricious billionaire creates a machine to open a doorway to the afterlife. This causes a rupture in the separation between the human world and the ghost world. With ghosts invading the human world, the Ghostbusters must find a way to shut down his machine before the entire world is overrun with spooks and phantoms. Note: This episode originally ended with the DIC green vortex/CPT logo. Absent: Janine Melnitz & Slimer
38	25	"No One Comes to Lupusville"	Masakazu Higuchi	J. Michael Straczynski	October 5, 1987	76025
The Ghostbusters are hired by a mysterious man named Gregore, leader of a small secluded village called Lupusville, that is located deep in the woods, to get rid of a coven of vampires. As they investigate, it turns out that all of the residents are vampires, having their own servants as well. One group is led by Gregore, who took over the town and wishes to come out into the modern world. The other group is led by the old leader, an unnamed vampire who wishes to keep their existence a secret from the world. While Ray and Peter are captured/recruited by the forest vampires after a desperate fight, Egon and Winston are held captive by Gregore and his followers, who want to use them to eliminate their vampiric enemies. As both sides prepare to battle, Winston and Egon are freed by a young slave named Lita, who takes a liking to Egon. Once freed, thanks to Lita finding one of their undamaged proton packs, Egon and Winston find the imprisoned townspeople who originally lived in the village and release them. As the two vampire groups battle, with the Ghostbusters caught in the middle, the townspeople arrive and reveal themselves to be werewolves who chose to live in isolation from the rest of the world for their own safety. Gregore and his minions were unaware of this when they imprisoned them, which leads to a three-way fight consisting of two supernatural races. The Ghostbusters are finally united and escape the chaos, as the battle between the vampries and werewolves is mutating the two groups into each other. The Ghostbusters destroy the dam to the village, causing a moat to form which prevents both the vampires and werewolves from leaving. As they are leaving Lupusville, Lita is seen sitting on the bumper of Ecto-1 as it drives away. Note: This episode originally ended with the DIC green vortex/CPT logo.
39	26	"Drool, the Dog-Faced Goblin"	Masakazu Higuchi	Linda Woolverton	October 29, 1987	76026
The Ghostbusters meet Drool, an unamalgamated shapeshifting entity, at a Poconos sideshow. Later, it seems the creature has escaped the main tent and is delighted in wreaking havoc and taunting the boys. But, especially when dealing with shapeshifters, things are seldom what they seem, when the guys realize that they're being stalked by a vengeful and maliciously playful shapeshifter that they failed to bust a week ago. Note 1: First released on video by RCA/Columbia's Magic Window division in the summer of 1987, along with "The Revenge of Murray the Mantis" and "Ghostbuster of the Year". Note 2: This episode originally ended with the DIC green vortex/CPT logo. Absent: Janine Melnitz & Slimer
40	27	"The Man Who Never Reached Home"	Masakazu Higuchi	Kathryn M. Drennan	October 12, 1987	76027
In 1887, Simon Queg, a selfish and wealthy man, began to ride home to Providence from New York on a dark and stormy night, but is chased by a mysterious man on horseback that appears out of nowhere and disappears, never reaching his home. One hundred years later, Ray sees him ride by, followed by a mysterious figure. After learning from a local cook that Queg is one of the 'local ghosts', but that 'the Rider' is a sign of disaster, the Ghostbusters decide to find out what is happening. It turns out that Queg has spent the past century trying to avoid the figure, and as a result has never been able to get home. When Ray tries to help him, he accidentally trades places with Queg, becoming trapped in the endless cycle Queg was in. The Ghostbusters, with Slimer's help, are able to summon back Ray and the ghost buggy, and together with Queg they are able to force the Rider into a showdown and break the curse that Queg has been under for over a century. As it turns out, the Rider was actually Queg's cruel and selfish nature that he has been running from for 100 years. Thanks to Ray, he was able to face it and free himself. The episode is loosely based on the 19th century fable of Peter Rugg. Note: This episode originally ended with the DIC green vortex/CPT logo. Absent: Janine Melnitz
41	28	"The Collect Call of Cathulhu"	Masakazu Higuchi	Michael Reaves	October 27, 1987	76028
When the Necronomicon, the most powerful book of spells in the world, is stolen from the New York Public Library, the Ghostbusters find themselves up against the Spawn, and Cult, of Cthulhu, who have stolen the book in order to bring the malevolent god back to Earth. Barely escaping from the Spawn when their weapons prove useless against them, as the Spawn are capable of super-regeneration, the guys turn to Professor Alice Derleth (Jodi Carlisle), a beautiful scholar and spell user, from Arkham, Mass., to help them stop Cthulhu's return. The guys raid the Cult's meeting place, only to get attacked by another Spawn-like creature, called a shoggoth, and Alice uses her spells to turn it to stone. The guys then turn to an old friend of Ray's who has access to old pulp magazines that tell how to defeat Cthulhu (which H. P. Lovecraft and other authors wrote based on the Necronomicon). When the team heads to Coney Island, they are unable to stop the resurrection as Cthulhu rampages through the park. The Ghostbusters' proton packs and Alice's spells prove useless in stopping the powerful 'Old One', and the boys are left with one option. Peter lures Cthulhu towards the roller coaster by shooting it in the head, so that the guys can ionize the coaster enough to attract a lightning bolt, blasting Cthulhu with 100 gigavolts of electricity, which they succeeded in doing and sends the creature back into hibernation. The Cult of Cthulhu has failed and is arrested by the cops, and Alice returns the Necronomicon to Arkham, but not before Peter takes her out on a date, though her version of a date is very different from Peter's. Note 1: This episode's title misspells "Cthulhu" as "Cathulhu". Note 2: This episode originally ended with the DIC green vortex/CPT logo. Absent: Slimer
42	29	"Bustman's Holiday"	Masakazu Higuchi	Richard Mueller	November 13, 1987	76029
Ray's Uncle Andrew dies in Scotland and names Ray as his heir to his castle. However, in order to claim it, Ray must get rid of a ghost that plagued his uncle for most of his life. Ray and the guys go to Scotland and, guided by the castle's executor, Angus Lenny, manage to bust the ghost, but when they do, they find out that it is a 'keystone' ghost. According to history, one man started a war between the Highlanders and the Lowlanders, called the Battle of Dunkell, and that one ghost pays for this tragedy. He is doomed to never rest so that the others may sleep. Once the keystone ghost is captured, the souls of the Highlanders and Lowlanders wake up and start fighting once again. Their war, which will ultimately destroy the village of Dunkell, is put on Ray's shoulders, and he heads to the village to plan a countermove while the others try to stall the two clans. Ray is able to rig a group of garbage trucks into makeshift ghost traps, and traps both clans inside them. The group later finds out that Mr. Lenny actually worked for Uncle Andrew's freeloading relatives, who wanted to frame Ray for destroying the village so that they could get the castle and the treasure. Ray turns the castle over to the village, and makes the executor pay for all the damage that was caused. Note: This episode originally ended with the DIC green vortex/CPT logo.
43	30	"The Headless Motorcyclist"	Masakazu Higuchi	Randy Lofficier	November 3, 1987	76030
For generations, the Headless Horseman has been haunting those descended from Ichabod Crane. It's up to the Ghostbusters to put a stop to it, especially when Peter is framed for the crime of nearly killing one of the Horseman, now Motorcyclist's, latest victims. Note: This episode originally ended with the DIC green vortex/CPT logo.
44	31	"The Thing in Mrs. Faversham's Attic"	Masakazu Higuchi	J. Michael Straczynski	November 4, 1987	76031
For 70 years, ghostly noises have emanated from the attic of a woman named Mrs. Agatha Faversham. She eventually hires the Ghostbusters to end this threat. Peter takes the case for free, because Mrs. Faversham reminds him of his mother. What they find is a demonic spirit that was summoned up by Agatha's father, Charles, in order to try to give his young daughter a better life. Unable to control the spirit, her father locked the creature in the attic and forbade his daughter from ever going up there. The Ghostbusters trick the spirit into revealing its true form and lure it into a ghost trap, with Slimer as bait. Note: This episode originally ended with the DIC green vortex/CPT logo.
45	32	"Egon on the Rampage"	Masakazu Higuchi	Marc Scott Zicree	December 8, 1987	76032
The Ghostbusters seem to have two problems: a newscast at their headquarters and Egon's soul being swapped with a demon's thanks to the reporters playing with their equipment. Now, Ray and Winston have to get Egon's possessed body back to the firehouse while Peter goes into another dimension to retrieve Egon's soul before the change becomes permanent. Note: This episode originally ended with the DIC green vortex/CPT logo.
46	33	"Lights! Camera! Haunting!"	Masakazu Higuchi	Marc Scott Zicree	December 7, 1987	76033
A movie director gets ghosts to help out in his project and all they want in return is to finish off the Ghostbusters. Note: This episode originally ended with the DIC green vortex/CPT logo. Absent: Janine Melnitz & Slimer
47	34	"The Bird of Kildarby"	Masakazu Higuchi	Craig Miller; Mark Nelson	October 6, 1987	76034
The Ghostbusters are called in by the Mayor of New York to evict a small army of ghosts from a recently-purchased Irish castle, set up in New York's Central Park, who will not allow anyone to enter. Peter goes to negotiate with the leader of the ghosts, only to aggravate the ghost leader as only he can, who forces the Ghostbusters into a wager: if they can defeat the Bird of Kildarby, Lord Kildarby (Hal Smith) and his men will leave the castle, but if the birdlike monster defeats them, everyone in New York must leave Manhattan. Note 1: First released on video by RCA/Columbia's Magic Window division in the spring of 1987, along with "Night Game" and "Lost and Foundry". Note 2: This episode originally ended with the DIC green vortex/CPT logo. Absent: Slimer
48	35	"Janine Melnitz, Ghostbuster"	Masakazu Higuchi	Michael Reaves	September 29, 1987	76035
With the Ghostbusters captured by a powerful ghost, who is actually an Elder God like Gozer, it is up to Janine to rescue them. Note: This episode originally ended with the DIC green vortex/CPT logo.
49	36	"Apocalypse—What, Now?"	Masakazu Higuchi	Mark Edward Edens; Michael Edens	November 18, 1987	76036
Centuries ago, the Codex of Saint Theopolis was lost during a raid on a monastery by bandits. In modern-day New York, Peter and Ray accidentally buy the book at an auction, when Peter sneezes due to excess dust. Janine, on her lunch break, opens the book, not knowing that it contains the spirits of the legendary Four Horsemen of the Apocalypse, who wreak havoc upon the city, and ultimately the world. Unable to stop the four specters, the Ghostbusters are joined by a priest from Greece, whose ancient order once protected the Codex of St. Theopolis, since it was St. Theopolis who imprisoned the Four Horsemen 1,000 years ago. The Ghostbusters must journey to Greece to acquire a special ring/seal before the world ends. Note: This episode originally ended with the DIC green vortex/CPT logo. Absent: Slimer
50	37	"Lost and Foundry"	Masakazu Higuchi	Mark Edward Edens	October 16, 1987	76037
Escaping from the Ghostbusters, a ghost gets merged with a pot of molten steel at a Foundry, and ends up getting turned into a variety of everyday items: steel girders, a refrigerator, a steel pole, nails, food cans, a power cable, even a work of neo-Impressionist art, bringing them to life in order to make itself whole once again. The Ghostbusters chase down the inanimate objects to a junk yard, where the different metal pieces have come together to form a giant metal monster. The Ghostbusters trap it using a magnet, and then melt the metal back down in order to free the ghost so that they can trap him regularly. Note 1: First released on video by RCA/Columbia's Magic Window division in the spring of 1987, along with "The Bird of Kildarby" and "Night Game". Note 2: This episode originally ended with the DIC green vortex/CPT logo.
51	38	"Hard Knight's Day"	Masakazu Higuchi	Steve Perrin; Bruce Reid Schaeffer	November 30, 1987	76038
Peter's bookish and snobbish date takes him to see an ancient tapestry on display. The only thing is, the exhibit's main attraction is a painting of a knight who comes to life and Peter's date is a dead ringer for the knight's wife. Note: This episode originally ended with the warp-speed DIC kid in bed/Coca-Cola Telecommunications logo.
52	39	"Cold Cash and Hot Water"	Masakazu Higuchi	Richard Mueller	October 8, 1987	76039
Peter's father, Charles, is working in Alaska, and unearths an Inuit statue that holds a powerful demon called Hob Anagarak, who the Eskimos called 'The First Demon'. Egon states that 'The Hob' is one of the rarest of legends, and the guys go to Alaska in order to investigate. En route, Egon reveals that Hob Anagarak was created by the gods, and set to rule over Earth when it was newly created. But when the humans came, Hob attacked them. They defeated Hob and sealed the fire demon away in a block of magic black ice. This eventually led to the Ice Age. When the guys get to the village where the block is, they find out that Peter's father wants them to release the demon and trap it, so that he can put it on an exhibit. Peter, naturally, refuses to let this happen. Later that night, when the guys are psychically attacked by Hob Anagarak, who levitates and throws silverware and a moose's head at them, Peter's dad switches the block for a fake. The next morning, the guys use their proton packs to destroy the black ice, which they find pretty easy. Thinking they have destroyed The Hob, the Ghostbusters return to New York. A few days later, the guys find out that Peter's father conned them and is planning to unveil The Hob at Madison Square Garden. Charles and Dr. Bassingame, the phony spiritualist responsible for destroying Ray's aunt's home, free The Hob from the ice, and in true King Kong-fashion the demon breaks free of his confinement and goes on a rampage. Peter, upset at his father for tricking him, leads the Ghostbusters to try to stop Hob, but their weapons prove useless against the mighty fire demon. Egon eventually finds out two important things: 1) The Hob is looking to enslave an army of ghosts to lay waste to the world, meaning he is coming for the Ecto-Containment Unit in the firehouse, and 2) he finds a tricky binding ritual that requires all of them, Janine, Peter's father and Dr. Bassingame, to stop The Hob. The ritual proves effective, and The Hob is once again sealed in his block of ice. Peter's father is sent back to Iowa after Peter pays his fines, only to sneak off the bus and get on another one, heading for Hollywood to sell the film rights. Note: This episode originally ended with the DIC green vortex/CPT logo.
53	40	"The Scaring of the Green"	Masakazu Higuchi	Michael Edens; Mark Edward Edens	November 16, 1987	76040
When the Ghostbusters are arrested for accidentally nearly killing the Mayor's wife (June Foray) (actually just frying her dress off) the deputy police chief, O'Malley, makes a deal with them to get them out of their predicament. According to him, an ancestor of his stole a pot of gold from a leprechaun, which caused the leprechaun to curse the O'Malley family line. Every St. Patrick's Day, during a full moon, a Bog Hound rises up and seeks out the head of the O'Malley clan, which is the deputy police chief, to carry them off. The only thing that can stop the Hound is a four-leaf clover. The Ghostbusters search the city for a four-leaf clover, while Egon goes alone to try to catch the Bog Hound with 'science'. While Egon finds the Bog Hound at the New York City Zoo, he finds out that his proton pack is uncharged, leaving him defenseless as the Hound chases him down. After getting treed by the Hound, which is full of lions, tigers and leopards, Egon barely escapes by tricking the Hound, and then tries to regroup with the others. Peter eventually finds a four-leaf clover, but Slimer eats it. The Ghostbusters have no choice but to play bodyguard to Deputy Chief O'Malley in order to find and capture the Bog Hound. When the Hound attacks O'Malley at the St. Patrick's Day parade, the Ghostbusters try to stop it, only to get their proton packs damaged in the fight. Peter distracts the Hound with a fake four-leaf clover (which he didn't know was plastic) and leads it into a ghost trap laid by Egon. The Ghostbusters are then proclaimed 'Honorary Irishmen' by the St. Patrick's Day Committee. Note: This episode originally ended with the DIC green vortex/CPT logo.
54	41	"They Call me MISTER Slimer"	Masakazu Higuchi	J. Michael Straczynski	September 18, 1987	76041
Slimer tries to earn money by becoming a bodyguard for a kid that gets pushed around by bullies, who hire their own monsters to get back at Slimer, which turns out to be more trouble than they're worth. Note: This episode originally ended with the warp-speed choir DIC kid in bed/Coca-Cola Telecommunications logo, and was the last one to use it. These logos were only used for the first week of RGB on Episodes 1-2 and 4-5. Episode 3 ("Ragnarok and Roll") used the kid voice-over, which would frequently be used starting on 9/21/87, or sometimes the DIC green vortex logo.
55	42	"Last Train to Oblivion"	Masakazu Higuchi	Michael Edens; Mark Edward Edens	November 24, 1987	76042
Peter becomes trapped on a train with Casey Jones' ghost and it's up to the other guys to save him, before the train he has hijacked reaches oblivion. However, Casey Jones actually seeks redemption for a terrible train crash over 100 years ago, which the Ghostbusters are unaware of as they try to rescue Peter by chasing down the train and trying to survive Ray's crazy plans and driving. Note: This episode originally ended with the warp-speed DIC kid in bed/Coca-Cola Telecommunications logo. Absent: Janine Melnitz
56	43	"Masquerade"	Masakazu Higuchi	Mark Nelson; Craig Miller	December 1, 1987	76043
Bullied boy Kenny Fenderman (R. J. Williams) gets made a junior Ghostbuster, which Peter thinks is more of a game and joke to the boy. The other kids want him to prove himself by staying overnight in a house believed to be haunted. What's more is that Kenny was given an untested device of Egon's, by Peter, that could hurt him more than help. The guys track down Kenny at the haunted mansion, come face-to-face with a ghostly general and his minions, and need Kenny's help to stop the ghost once and for all. Note: This episode originally ended with the warp-speed DIC kid in bed/Coca-Cola Telecommunications logo. Absent: Slimer
57	44	"Janine's Day Off"	Masakazu Higuchi	Michael Reaves; Steve Perry	September 14, 1987	76044
Egon goes with Janine to see her relatives, while Peter, Winston and Ray have to deal with imps at the firehouse. But trouble starts when the imps merge into a gigantic monster that rampages across New York, and Janine, Louise (the temp secretary) and Slimer have to deal with a trio of ghosts who find one of the Ghostbusters proton packs and start shooting up the already-damaged firehouse. Note: This episode originally ended with the warp-speed choir DIC kid in bed/Coca-Cola Telecommunications logo.
58	45	"The Ghostbusters in Paris"	Masakazu Higuchi	Randy Lofficier	October 23, 1987	76045
When a workman accidentally damages a strange device in the workshop of Gustave Eiffel, at the top of the Eiffel Tower in Paris, France, he unwittingly frees a horde of ghosts that had been imprisoned within the Tower itself for nearly a century. With the Tower officially haunted, the French government turns to the Ghostbusters for help. The Ghostbusters agree to help, but when they arrive at the Tower, they find hundreds of thousands of ghosts haunting every level of the massive structure. After fighting through hordes of ghosts they get to the workshop, and Egon discovers that Gustave Eiffel designed the Tower to be a primitive but effective ghost containment unit. When the control box was damaged, the Tower started leaking ghosts. Worse, unless the leak is plugged it will eventually explode, releasing millions of ghosts from its structure. Using their own proton packs to power the control box, in order to temporarily imprison the ghosts, the Ghostbusters travel to the Louvre museum and Notre Dame cathedral in order to find Eiffel's secret papers that tell how to repair the device, fighting off the most aggressive of the ghosts that try to stop them from reaching those notes. The Ghostbusters succeed in repairing the device, only to fail in stopping the ghosts from destroying it. Unable to repair the control box before the Tower explodes, the Ghostbusters resort to a desperate measure, using the Tower's broadcasting equipment to transport the ghosts from France to America, via satellite, where they are pulled into the Ghostbusters' Ecto-Containment Unit thanks to Ray's new satellite dish. Once the guys get back to the states, they find out all the money they got from the French has gone to the cable company to pay off the customers who watched 'five hours of cursing French ghosts' on their satellite television sets. Note: This episode originally ended with the DIC green vortex/CPT logo.
59	46	"The Devil in the Deep"	Masakazu Higuchi	J. M. DeMatteis	December 4, 1987	76046
When Necksa, lord and ruler of the undines, declares war against the air-breathers for their constant pollution of the seas, the Ghostbusters are hard-pressed to stop him before he drowns the city. Things get worse when Egon, Ray and Winston are swallowed by Necksa, and Peter is left alone to stop the monstrous behemoth on his own. Note: This episode originally ended with the warp-speed DIC kid in bed/Coca-Cola Telecommunications logo. Absent: Slimer
60	47	"Ghost Fight at the O.K. Corral"	Masakazu Higuchi	Mark Edward Edens	November 11, 1987	76047
The Ghostbusters visit Tombstone, Arizona, where they have a showdown with the spirits of the Earp brothers and Doc Holliday. Note 1: First released on video by RCA/Columbia's Magic Window division in the Fall of 1987. Note 2: This episode originally ended with the DIC green vortex/CPT logo.
61	48	"Ghostbuster of the Year"	Masakazu Higuchi	Mark Edward Edens	October 1, 1987	76048
A woman (Anne E. Curry) hires Peter, Ray, Egon, and Winston to get rid of Hearst Castle from the ghost of publishing mogul Charles Foster Hearst. Whoever catches him will get named Ghostbuster of the Year. It eventually turns out that Hearst's ghost simply wanted his sled, called "Rosebud". Note 1: First released on video by RCA/Columbia's Magic Window division in the summer of 1987, along with "The Revenge of Murray the Mantis" and "Drool, the Dog-Faced Goblin". Note 2: This episode originally ended with the DIC green vortex/CPT logo. Absent: Slimer
62	49	"Deadcon I"	Masakazu Higuchi	Mark Edward Edens; Michael Edens	December 2, 1987	76049
Ghosts organize a convention at a hotel and the owner gets the Ghostbusters to bust them. What's more, the ghosts want the Stay Puft Marshmallow Man out for their convention. Note: This episode originally ended with the warp-speed DIC kid in bed/Coca-Cola Telecommunications logo. Absent: Slimer
63	50	"The Cabinet of Calamari"	Masakazu Higuchi	Michael Edens; Mark Edward Edens	September 30, 1987	76050
During the Ghostbusters' attempt to catch a ghost, a magician's interference sends Peter through a cabinet into another dimension. Note: This episode originally ended with the DIC green vortex/CPT logo. Absent: Slimer
64	51	"A Ghost Grows in Brooklyn"	Masakazu Higuchi	Michael Edens; Mark Edward Edens	November 20, 1987	76051
A ghost evades capture by hiding in a geranium. Janine takes the plant to her apartment, where it grows big enough to take over the city. Note: This episode originally ended with the warp-speed DIC kid in bed/Coca-Cola Telecommunications logo.
65	52	"The Revenge of Murray the Mantis"	Masakazu Higuchi	Richard Mueller	November 2, 1987	76052
He was thought to have been destroyed during the Gozer incident, but now Thanksgiving takes a turn for the worse when ghosts take over the Murray the Mantis balloon. The Ghostbusters are powerless to stop it, and all hope seems to have vanished, except for one faint beacon of light, a light that may yet shine again and save New York; that light is none other than the mascot of Stay Puft Marshmallows returning from the dead to battle Murray the Mantis and ghost is THE STAY PUFT MARSHMALLOW MAN. Note 1: First released on video by RCA/Columbia's Magic Window division in the summer of 1987, along with "Drool, the Dog-Faced Goblin" and "Ghostbuster of the Year". Note 2: This episode originally ended with the DIC green vortex/CPT logo.
66	53	"Rollerghoster"	Masakazu Higuchi	Richard Mueller	September 23, 1987	76053
An amusement park starts up a new ride by the name of Ecto-1, but it is haunted by ghosts of animals. Note: This episode originally ended with the DIC green vortex/CPT logo.
67	54	"I Am the City"	Masakazu Higuchi	Richard Mueller	November 23, 1987	76054
A Babylonian god known as Marduk (Stanley Ralph Ross) and his enemy, a multi-headed dragon called Tiamat, arrive in the city and the Ghostbusters get caught in the middle of their ancient battle to protect the city. Note: This episode originally ended with the warp-speed DIC kid in bed/Coca-Cola Telecommunications logo. Absent: Janine Melnitz & Slimer
68	55	"Moaning Stones"	Masakazu Higuchi	Steven Barnes	November 5, 1987	76055
Winston gets help from an ancestor in order to stop an ancient demon (Arthur Burghardt) from Africa that is unwittingly released by a scientist at the Natural History Museum. Note: This episode originally ended with the DIC green vortex/CPT logo.
69	56	"The Long, Long, Long, Etc. Goodbye"	Masakazu Higuchi	Pamela Hickey; Dennys McCoy	October 7, 1987	76056
The spirit of a private detective helps the Ghostbusters capture a cursed ghost named Blackey, who 40 years ago stole a cursed Egyptian treasure, was mutated into a monstrous guardian, and who cannot rest until the treasure is returned to the tomb. Note: This episode originally ended with the DIC green vortex/CPT logo.
70	57	"Buster the Ghost"	Masakazu Higuchi	Robert Loren Fleming; Keith Giffen	September 21, 1987	76057
Buster the Ghost, a lonely and confused ghost, tries to help the Ghostbusters out by gathering ghosts at the firehouse. Note: This episode originally ended with the DIC green vortex/CPT logo.
71	58	"The Devil to Pay"	Masakazu Higuchi	Dennys McCoy; Pamela Hickey	November 19, 1987	76058
Winston and Ray are convinced by Peter to go on a game show and win a free vacation to Tahiti. It turns out that the host is a minor demon (Greg Burson) looking to become the next devil, and the prize is their souls. Note: This episode originally ended with the warp-speed DIC kid in bed/Coca-Cola Telecommunications logo. Absent: Janine Melnitz & Slimer
72	59	"Slimer, Is That You?"	Masakazu Higuchi	J. Michael Straczynski	September 26, 1987	76059 (Note: "Slimer, Is That You?" was written for the syndicated season, but produced and aired in the second network season. "Transylvania Homesick Blues" was written for the second network season and switched places during production with "Slimer, Is That You?", airing in syndication and resulting in the use of Season 1 character designs.)
Egon and Slimer switch minds and the timing couldn't be worse, as an egomaniacal ghost named the Master of Shadows (William Marshall) wishes to test his wits against the brainy 'buster', and destroy New York if he fails to measure up. Note 1: Also exists in a re-dubbed version with Dave Coulier and Kath Soucie as Peter and Janine, respectively. This was the version that first aired in America, before it was replaced with the original, which had previously aired internationally. Note 2: This episode originally ended with the DIC green vortex/CPT logo.
73	60	"Egon's Ghost"	Masakazu Higuchi	Michael Reaves	September 28, 1987	76060
One of Egon's devices throws him slightly out of phase with reality, rendering him, for all intents and purposes, a ghost. Ghostbusters try bring him back to this plane of existence before he disappears forever. Note: This episode originally ended with the DIC green vortex/CPT logo.
74	61	"Captain Steel Saves the Day"	Masakazu Higuchi	Michael Reaves; Steve Perry	September 17, 1987	76061
A comic book is about to get cancelled, and so the superhero on whom it focuses escapes the pages and starts fighting crime in New York. His nemesis (Peter Cullen) also escapes and releases the ghosts from the containment unit. Note: This episode originally ended with the warp-speed choir DIC kid in bed/Coca-Cola Telecommunications logo.
75	62	"Victor the Happy Ghost"	Masakazu Higuchi	Marc Scott Zicree	October 15, 1987	76062
Note: This episode originally ended with the DIC green vortex/CPT logo.
76	63	"Egon's Dragon"	Masakazu Higuchi	Marc Scott Zicree	October 2, 1987	76063
Note: This episode originally ended with the DIC green vortex/CPT logo.
77	64	"Dairy Farm"	Masakazu Higuchi	Marc Scott Zicree	September 25, 1987	76064
Note: This episode originally ended with the warp-speed DIC kid in bed/Coca-Cola Telecommunications logo.
78	65	"The Hole in the Wall Gang"	Masakazu Higuchi	William Rostler; Richard Muller	October 21, 1987	76065
Note: This was the final episode where Lorenzo Music and Laura Summer, respectively, did the voices of Peter Venkman and Janine Melnitz. Note: This episode originally ended with the DIC green vortex/CPT logo.

==== Season 3 (1987; ABC Season 2) ====
No. overal	No. in season	Title	Directed by	Written by	Original air date	Prod. code
79	1	"Baby Spookums"	Richard Raynis; Masakazu Higuchi	Len Janson; Chuck Menville	September 12, 1987	140001
A rip between dimensions allows a small friendly ghost to wander off into New York and Slimer decides to look after it. However, the ghost's parents come looking for their child, but the Ghostbusters do not know that and try to bust them. Note: Kath Soucie and Dave Coulier replaced Laura Summer and Lorenzo Music as the respective voices of Janine Melnitz and Peter Venkman beginning with this season.
80	2	"It's a Jungle Out There"	Richard Raynis; Masakazu Higuchi	Len Janson; Chuck Menville	September 19, 1987	140003
An animalistic demon gives all the animals in New York the ability to talk and interact, acting like humans in a lot of ways, and uses them to help take over the world.
81	3	"The Boogeyman Is Back"	Richard Raynis; Masakazu Higuchi	Michael Reaves	October 3, 1987	140007
After an almost deadly fall off the World Trade Center, Egon's fears start to get the better of him, so much that the Boogeyman manages to tap into his fear and escape from his realm. Absent: Janine Melnitz
82	4	"Once Upon a Slime"	Richard Raynis; Masakazu Higuchi	Len Janson; Chuck Menville	October 10, 1987	140008
When Slimer hides a book of fairy tales under one of Egon's newest machines, everything in the book comes to life.
83	5	"The Two Faces of Slimer"	Richard Raynis; Masakazu Higuchi	Michael Reaves	October 17, 1987	140002
An ectoplasmic entity leaks out of the containment unit and it makes Slimer mutate into a big ugly monster during his sleep.
84	6	"Sticky Business"	Richard Raynis; Masakazu Higuchi	Richard Mueller	October 24, 1987	140006
The Ghostbusters release the Stay Puft Marshmallow Man from the containment unit to shoot a commercial in exchange for getting $50,000 for a children's hospital. During the process of letting Stay Puft out, a vicious manta ray-like phantom escapes in order to seek revenge against the Ghostbusters.
85	7	"Halloween II 1/2"	Richard Raynis; Masakazu Higuchi	Pamela Hickey; Dennys McCoy	October 31, 1987	140004
Samhain's goblins release the spirit of Halloween from the Ecto-Containment Unit, and he turns the firehouse into his fortress. The Ghostbusters' attempts to take him down are foiled when the Junior Ghostbusters are captured by the vengeful spirit, and it's up to Slimer to help get them out.
86	8	"Loathe Thy Neighbor"	Richard Raynis; Masakazu Higuchi	Michael Reaves	November 7, 1987	140013
A family asks the Ghostbusters to find out why a bunch of weird stuff is happening in their house. This is complicated by the macabre nature of their mansion, with a very Addams Family vibe. Absent: Janine Melnitz
87	9	"The Grundel"	Richard Raynis; Masakazu Higuchi	J. Michael Straczynski	November 14, 1987	140011
A boy named Lee goes to the Ghostbusters for help when his brother, Alec, begins acting strangely and doing bad things. When the guys decide to investigate, Egon learns that Grundel is making Alec do bad things and if something is not done soon, he will mutate into one.
88	10	"Big Trouble With Little Slimer"	Richard Raynis; Masakazu Higuchi	Len Janson; Chuck Menville	November 21, 1987	140005
The Ghostbusters' old "pal" and nemesis, Walter J. Peck, ex-EPA hatchet man extraordinaire, is back from the Gozer incident, and he's trying to raise some trouble with the Ghostbusters again. First he tries to get them arrested for illegal trespassing by calling in a phony ghost alert at a military base in Queens, but after that backfires, Peck joins up with BUFO (Bureau of Unidentified Flying Organisms), and takes Slimer with a court order. After some tests, Peck deems Slimer a hazard case and plans to destroy him with a cyclotron, forcing Ghostbusters to save Slimer from Peck.
89	11	"The Copycat"	Richard Raynis; Masakazu Higuchi	Michael Reaves	December 5, 1987	140009
The Ghostbusters have to deal with a shapeshifter in their own headquarters.
90	12	"Transylvanian Homesick Blues"	Richard Raynis; Masakazu Higuchi	Michael Reaves	December 11, 1987	140012
Count Vostak of Boldavia requests the Ghostbusters to join him at his castle. It turns out that giant humanoid bat are terrorizing a local village, and the villagers are turning against Vostak because they believe him to be a vampire. What is more, is that Vostak IS a vampire, but the attacking bats don't belong to him. Note: "Transylvanian Homesick Blues" was the last episode for Arsenio Hall as the scratched voice actor of Winston Zeddmore.
91	13	"Camping It Up"	Richard Raynis; Masazaku Higuchi	Michael Reaves	December 12, 1987	140010
Our heroes, the Ghostbusters, embark on a camping trip, only to run into, among other thing, Bigfoot. Note: Beginning on January 30, 1988, the program was expanded to an hour, predating the eventual renaming to Slimer! and the Real Ghostbusters by eight months.

=== Slimer! and the Real Ghostbusters ===
==== Season 4 (1988; ABC Season 3) ====
No. overal	No. in season	Title	Directed by	Written by	Original air date	Prod. code
92	1 (Note: During this seasons' hour-long block, two or three Slimer! shorts were shown, with an episode of The Real Ghostbusters, rerun or debut airing, sandwiched in between.)	"The Joke's on Ray"	Will Meugniot; Kazuo Terada	Len Janson; Chuck Menville	September 10, 1988	175003
Ray and Slimer have been in a joking mood lately, but things are about to get worse when a magical box is opened and releases two imps that like to play deadly practical jokes. Note: Buster Jones replaced Arsenio Hall as the voice of Winston Zeddemore, beginning with this season. Note: The show was now re-titled Slimer! and The Real Ghostbusters. Note: In the original broadcasts of the 1988-1989 season, the end credits were 1 minute long, and featured clips from the Slimer! spin-off, and the old sequence for the regular show. In international broadcasts, as well as on the Time-Life DVD, they're replaced with separate 30-second end credits for both shows. Note: In the original (ABC) airing, the Columbia Pictures Television logo with Coca-Coca byline was reused, as it was in Season 1. Note: The title card jingle is now the outro of the ending theme.
93	2	"Flip Side"	Will Meugniot; Kazuo Terada	Tony Marino	September 17, 1988	175001
Peter, Egon and Ray are transported to another dimension via a supernatural tornado. They arrive in Boo York and not only do they have to worry about getting home, but they must also avoid the ghostly Peoplebusters.
94	3	"Poultrygeist"	Will Meugniot; Kazuo Terada	Duane Capizzi; Steven Roberts	September 24, 1988	175002
Peter, Ray and Winston get a call from a farmer, who claims to have encountered a giant were-chicken. They find a giant were-chicken egg and Peter and Slimer bring it back to the firehouse, where it hatches and the were-chicken inside bites Egon, mutating him into one.
95	4	"Standing Room Only"	Will Meugniot; Kazuo Terada	Richard Mueller	October 8, 1988	175004
It's spring and a hay fever-stricken Peter doesn't want to leave the firehouse, so he invents a ghost attractor that will bring the ghosts to them instead. The ghosts do start arriving, but it's not because of Peter's invention. It's because the ghosts are fleeing from Mee-Krah, a ghost-eating entity that will destroy New York City if it isn't stopped.
96	5	"Robo-Buster"	Will Meugniot; Kazuo Terada	Francis Moss	October 15, 1988	175005
Janine's rich new boyfriend, Paul Smart (Dan Gilvezan), steals a ghost trap and other technology to build a ghost-catching robot, Robo-Buster. The Ghostbusters are being driven out of business by Robo-Buster, which seemingly destroys ghosts rather than trapping them. It turns out all of those ghosts, including poor Slimer, have been made into one giant ghost because of this and they want revenge.
97	6	"Short Stuff"	Will Meugniot; Kazuo Terada	Richard Mueller	October 22, 1988	175006
The vile Ghostmaster sends his three of his best bounty hunters to capture the Ghostbusters alive. The first two get busted, but the third shrinks the guys down. While they try to avoid being captured, Janine and Slimer must try to find a spell to return them to their normal size. Note: Len Janson, Chuck Menville, and Richard Mueller were credited for the story after the title card was shown.
98	7	"Follow That Hearse"	Will Meugniot; Kazuo Terada	Len Janson; Chuck Menville	November 5, 1988	175008
As Winston readies Ecto-1 for a car show, the Ghostbusters get called to a dump to stop a very angry ghost. They fail to trap the ghost and think it got away, but it really takes over Ecto-1.
99	8	"The Brooklyn Triangle"	Will Meugniot; Kazuo Terada	Richard Mueller	November 19, 1988	175007
The Ghostbusters have been losing stuff left and right lately and they aren't the only ones. As it turns out, it's part of a hole that has been opened at Winston's father's (Roscoe Lee Browne) construction site. When Winston and his dad fall in, Peter and Ray go after them and arrive in the Land of Lost Objects.

==== Season 5 (1989; ABC Season 4) ====
No. overal	No. in season	Title	Directed by	Written by	Original air date	Prod. code
100	1 (Note: During this season, the hour-long block would feature either a 14- minute episode of The Real Ghostbusters, a 21-minute episode, and a 7-minute Slimer! short rerun, or two 21-minute episodes of the former.)	"Transcendental Tourists (Note: 14-minute episode. This, and "Something's Going Around", aired alongside a rerun of the Slimer! short "Room at the Top".)"	Will Meugniot; Kazuo Terada	Len Janson; Chuck Menville	September 9, 1989	201010
A family of ghosts on vacation work to remove those they believe are interrupting their peace and quiet, including Peter, Winston and Slimer. Note: A new CPT byline is now used: A Unit of Columbia Pictures Entertainment with a new 6-note horn music. Note: The title card is now superimposed with the first scene of the episode, which the Slimer! spin-off had already done. Note: This season was set after the events of Ghostbusters II. Thus, Janine has her look from that film, and has a relationship with Louis Tully. Absent: Ray Stantz, Egon Spengler, Janine Melnitz, and Louis Tully
101	2	"Something's Going Around"	Will Meugniot; Kazuo Terada	Len Janson; Chuck Menville	September 9, 1989	201001
Peter falls ill, and Louis asks a doctor (Stanley Ralph Ross) he met two days ago to come and take a look. It turns out the doctor has sent them potato chips, which makes people allergic to ghosts, and only Peter has eaten enough of them. The doctor gives them more chips. What the Ghostbusters don't know is that the doctor is a ghost and they have to develop resistance to the allergy. Note: First appearance of Louis Tully.
102	3	"Trading Faces (Note: 14-minute episode. This, and "Elementary My Dear Winston", aired alongside a rerun of a Slimer! short.)"	Will Meugniot; Kazuo Terada	Len Janson; Chuck Menville	September 16, 1989	201009
A bad lookalike of Slimer on the run arrives in the firehouse via a mirror and sends Louis and the real Slimer to the Ghost World. Absent: Ray Stantz and Winston Zeddemore
103	4	"Elementary My Dear Winston"	Will Meugniot; Kazuo Terada	Richard Mueller	September 16, 1989	201003
The legendary and apparently ghostly Sherlock Holmes and Watson arrive in New York to find Professor Moriarty. When Watson gets captured, Sherlock Holmes selects Winston to help him. Moriarty seeks to absorb all the ghosts in the containment unit.
104	5	"Slimer's Curse (Note: 14-minute episode. This, and "Partners in Slime", aired alongside a rerun of a Slimer! short.)"	Will Meugniot; Kazuo Terada	Richard Mueller	September 23, 1989	201013
Slimer wins the lottery, only to find his winnings have been cursed. Absent: Louis Tully
105	6	"Partners in Slime"	Will Meugniot; Kazuo Terada	Richard Mueller	September 23, 1989	201005
A year after the Ghostbusters defeated Vigo the Carpathian, a ghost named Poso kidnaps Janine and Louis to force the Ghostbusters to hand over their business. The Ghostbusters get help from a recently-captured ghost, Shifter, to find out why Poso wants their business and where to find him. Covered in mood slime, Peter goes to the Ghost Town to save Louis and Janine.
106	7	"Til Death Do Us Part (Note: 14-minute episode. This, and a rerun of "Mrs. Roger's Neighborhood", aired alongside a rerun of the Slimer! short "Quickslimer Messenger Service".)"	Will Meugniot; Kazuo Terada	Pat Allee; Ben Hurst	September 30, 1989	201014
The Ghostbusters get a temp (who turns out to be a ghost) and she decides Egon would make a great husband. Absent: Louis Tully
107	8	"Three Men and an Egon (Note: Aired alongside a rerun of a previous season episode.)"	Will Meugniot; Kazuo Terada	Joe S. Landon	October 7, 1989	201002
A confrontation with a giant clock monster causes Egon to become younger and younger. The catch is that they only have until midnight, at which time the now infant Egon will vanish from existence forever. Absent: Janine Melnitz
108	9	"Kitty-Cornered (Note: 14-minute episode. This, and a rerun of "Troll Bridge", aired alongside a rerun of a Slimer! short.)"	Will Meugniot; Kazuo Terada	Pamela Hickey; Dennys McCoy	October 14, 1989	201012
Slimer finds a cat that can make all of his dreams come true. Absent: Janine Melnitz, Peter Venkman, and Winston Zeddemore
109	10	"If I Were a Witch Man (Note: Aired alongside a rerun of "Camping It Up".)"	Will Meugniot; Kazuo Terada	Charles Kaufman	October 21, 1989	201004
The Ghostbusters are called to stop a witch that has been terrorizing the town of Lewiston. She wants revenge against the descendants of those who imprisoned her 300 years ago, which includes Egon.
110	11	"It's About Time (Note: 14-minute episode. This, and a rerun of "Loathe Thy Neighbor", aired alongside a rerun of a Slimer! short.)"	Will Meugniot; Kazuo Terada	Len Janson; Chuck Menville	October 28, 1989	201015
The firehouse is going to be torn down to make way for a new expressway, but that's the least of the Ghostbusters' problems. The guys and Slimer get sent back to 1959 due to a trap accident. They have to find a way back and fight ghosts without their equipment. Absent: Louis Tully
111	12	"The Halloween Door"	Will Meugniot; Kazuo Terada	J. Michael Straczynski	October 29, 1989	75002 (Note: First aired as a prime-time special.)
The Ghostbusters are confronted by Crowley (Michael Rye) and his group, who want their help in ending Halloween. The guys turn him down, but one of their PKE meters is stolen and used by Crowley to accomplish his goal. All he does is break a seal, opening the real world to numerous ghosts – including the huge, rampaging Boogaloo (Brian O'Neal) – and giving the Ghostbusters a lot to handle on Halloween night.
112	13	"Jailbusters (Note: Aired alongside a rerun of a previous season episode.)"	Will Meugniot; Kazuo Terada	Len Janson; Chuck Menville	November 4, 1989	201007
The Ghostbusters are tricked into letting their guard down and get captured by ghosts. They're charged with crimes against ghosts and stand trial. It's up to Janine, Louis and Slimer to save them from a horrible punishment.
113	14	"Surely You Joust (Note: 14-minute episode. This, and "Future Tense", aired alongside a rerun of a Slimer! short.)"	Will Meugniot; Kazuo Terada	Tony Marino	November 11, 1989	201011
The Ghostbusters become involved in the world of knights and dragons to free a captured Janine. Absent: Louis Tully
114	15	"Future Tense"	Will Meugniot; Kazuo Terada	Richard Mueller	November 11, 1989	201006
The Ghostbusters get a new TV as payment for a job. When Ray stays up to watch television, he sees into the Ghostbusters' future. The others don't believe him at first, but Ray is quickly proved right and the next vision shows them their deaths.
115	16	"Venk-Man! (Note: 14-minute episode. This, and a rerun of "Flip Side", aired alongside a rerun of a Slimer! short.)"	Will Meugniot; Kazuo Terada	Richard Mueller	November 18, 1989	201019
After being hit by Egon's experimental proton ray, Peter becomes something of a superhero, as his muscles grow and he becomes a bulging muscle hunk with powers, but it won't last long. Absent: Louis Tully
116	17	"Loose Screws (Note: 14-minute episode. This, and a rerun of a previous season episode, aired alongside a rerun of a Slimer! short.)"	Will Meugniot; Kazuo Terada	Pat Allee; Ben Hurst	November 25, 1989	201018
Slimer breaks a trap and doesn't completely fix it before the guys use it on a job. Now the essence inside starts to leak out and make inanimate objects come to life. Absent: Louis Tully
117	18	"The Ghostbusters! Live, from Al Capone's Tomb! (Note: Aired alongside a rerun of a previous season episode.)"	Will Meugniot; Kazuo Terada	J. Michael Straczynski	December 2, 1989	201008
The Ghostbusters are on live TV at the tomb of Al Capone (Jocko Marcellino) where his ghost is supposed to appear at midnight. Something does happen and the guys get transported to the other side, getting involved with Al Capone and other supernatural criminals.
118	19	"Revenge of the Ghostmaster (Note: 14-minute episode. This, and a rerun of a previous season episode, aired alongside a rerun of a Slimer! short.)"	Will Meugniot; Kazuo Terada	Richard Mueller	December 9, 1989	201017
The Ghostmaster is back and casts a spell on the Ghostbusters that causes all electronic equipment near them to shut off, including their proton packs and ghost traps.
119	20	"Slimer Streak (Note: 14-minute episode. This, and a rerun of "Standing Room Only", aired alongside a rerun of a Slimer! short.)"	Will Meugniot; Kazuo Terada	Pamela Hickey; Dennys McCoy	December 16, 1989	201020
Stuck on a train, the Ghostbusters have to play games to bring it to a halt. Absent: Janine Melnitz and Louis Tully
120	21	"The Ransom of Greenspud (Note: 14-minute episode. This, and a rerun of "Xmas Marks the Spot", aired alongside a rerun of a Slimer! short.)"	Will Meugniot; Kazuo Terada	Stan Phillips	December 23, 1989	201016
A trio of ghosts abduct Slimer and will keep him unless the Ghostbusters agree to free a ghost named Spiderlegs. Note: Final episode to feature music composed by Haim Saban and Shuki Levy. They were replaced by Thomas Chase and Steve Rucker at the beginning of the sixth season. Note: Last episode animated in Japan. Absent: Janine Melnitz

==== Season 6 (1990; ABC Season 5) ====
No. overal	No. in season	Title	Directed by	Written by	Original air date	Prod. code
121	1 (Note: The hour-long block now consisted of two full-length episodes of The Real Ghostbusters.)	"Janine, You've Changed"	Stan Phillips; Will Meugniot	J. Michael Straczynski	September 8, 1990	140–504
Looking through a photo album causes the Ghostbusters and Slimer to realize Janine has gone through numerous changes over the years. Some investigating shows that a supernatural force disguised as a fairy godmother (Rosalyn Landor) is the cause of it. Note: Slimer is reverted to pre-Season 3 changes and his tail is now reverted to a stub. Note: Thomas Chase and Steve Rucker take over as show composers from this episode onward. Note: This is the only season in which the end credits don't have the Ghostbusters dancing in a parade. Instead, the intro from the first two ABC seasons and syndicated season was used for the outro. Note: The same CPT logo as in the season before it is used again here. Note: For this season, story editing credits were shown after the superimposed title cards. Most of the episodes for this season were story edited by Len Janson and Chuck Menville, while J. Michael Straczynski story edited the three he wrote, as well as one written by Larry DiTillio. Note: For this and the final season, the show was now animated in South Korea.
122	2	"You Can't Teach an Old Demon New Tricks"	Stan Phillips; Will Meugniot	Larry DiTillio	September 8, 1990	140–503
A cabinet sends the Ghostbusters to another dimension and they encounter a demon interested in learning magic tricks. After years of meeting only magicians' assistants and white doves, the demon chooses Ray as his new teacher. Note: J. Michael Straczynski story edited this episode.
123	3	"The Haunting of Heck House"	Stan Phillips; Will Meugniot	J. Michael Straczynski	September 15, 1990	140–502
Kids are visiting the firehouse and Peter tells the story behind an old souvenir. The Ghostbusters have an opportunity to get millions of dollars so long as they stayed in a haunted house for one night, but with one condition: no proton packs.
124	4	"Ghostworld"	Stan Phillips; Will Meugniot	Len Janson; Chuck Menville	September 15, 1990	140–509
A ghost uses an amusement park called Ghost World as a way to gain control over the Ghostbusters. With everyone else under his power, only a sick Egon is capable of stopping him. Fortunately, he has his mother (Rose Marie) to help him out.
125	5	"Mean Green Teen Machine"	Stan Phillips; Will Meugniot	Jules Dennis	September 22, 1990	140–505
The Ghostbusters take a turn for the worse when they're invaded by a trio of ghosts (Cam Clarke, Anderson Wong) who like to surf and eat pizza. The situation is worse because the ghosts invade their dreams in order to trap them forever.
126	6	"Spacebusters"	Stan Phillips; Will Meugniot	Len Janson; Chuck Menville	September 22, 1990	140–506
Winston gets the chance of a lifetime when he gets to go up on a space station, but there's a nasty ghost up there absorbing the life force of anyone it can find. It'll take Winston and the other Ghostbusters to save the station.
127	7	"My Left Fang (Note: Either this or "Very Beast Friends" originally aired alongside a rerun of "Baby Spookums".)"	Stan Phillips; Will Meugniot	Sean Roche	September 29, 1990	140–513
The Ghosbusters and Slimer arrive in a German town and get an unusual request from the locals: to save ghosts. It turns out the local ghosts have been threatened by a creature that feeds on them.
128	8	"Russian About"	Stan Phillips; Will Meugniot	J. Michael Straczynski	October 6, 1990	140–501
During a trip to Russia, the Ghostbusters face off against a bizarre cult who wish to awaken one of the Old Ones from his eons-long slumber. In order to stop this powerful creature, they send Slimer back to New York to bring back a device that Egon finished inventing before leaving for Russia.
129	9	"The Slob"	Stan Phillips; Will Meugniot	Pamela Hickey; Dennys McCoy	October 6, 1990	140–511
After once again failing to capture Slimer, Professor Dweeb reaches an agreement with a ghost known as the Glob. The Glob will catch Slimer for Professor Dweeb and Dweeb will set the captured Sleaze free.
130	10	"Deja Boo (Note: "Deja Boo" aired in both hour-long and half-hour-long versions. Both versions tell the same story. The half-hour version contains flashbacks from "The Copycat", "Halloween II 1/2" and "Sticky Business". In the hour-long version, flashbacks from "The Two Faces of Slimer" are also shown. The half-hour version was paired up with an encore airing of "The Slob".)"	Stan Phillips; Will Meugniot	Chuck Menville; Richard Mueller; Pamela Hickey; Dennys McCoy; Michael Reaves	October 13, 1990	140–517
Professor Dweeb uses a machine to see Slimer's past adventures with the Ghostbusters.
131	11	"Afterlife in the Fast Lane (Note: Aired alongside a rerun of "Ghosts 'R Us".)"	Stan Phillips; Will Meugniot	Tony Marino	October 20, 1990	140–510
The Ghostbusters and Slimer compete with each other in a race to win money for a charity, but a ghost gamesmaster tricks them into entering the Netherworld during the race and getting out won't be easy.
132	12	"Guess What's Coming to Dinner (Note: Aired alongside a rerun of the Primetime special "The Halloween Door".)"	Stan Phillips; Will Meugniot	Jules Dennis	October 27, 1990	140–507
The Ghostbusters and Slimer return home from vacation to find a ghost family (modeled after The Simpsons, though with the names and personalities of The Bundys from Married... with Children) has moved in. Getting rid of them won't be easy since they threw away the Ghostbusters' proton packs. Things quickly get worse when the ghosts fiddle with the containment unit and set it to self-destruct.
133	13	"Stay Tooned (Note: Aired alongside a rerun of "Big Trouble With Little Slimer".)"	Stan Phillips; Will Meugniot	Len Janson; Chuck Menville	November 3, 1990	140–514
Ray and Slimer try to fix the TV so they can continue watching The Sammy K. Ferret Show (Christopher Collins), but a freak accident occurs and brings the title character into the real world. The Ghostbusters have to deal with them as Sammy's cartoon antics become all too real and dangerous.
134	14	"Very Beast Friends (Note: Either this or "My Left Fang" originally aired alongside a rerun of "Baby Spookums".)"	Stan Phillips; Will Meugniot	Gordon Bressack	November 10, 1990	140–508
Sumerian gods Anshar (the god of wind and water) and Kishar (the god of fire and earth) are waging their millennial fight. As gods, they are immortal, and thus neither can ever defeat the other, and can only face each other once every thousand years. They decide to transfer themselves to mortal bodies in order to settle their fight. As it happens, the Ghostbusters are going sailing that day. The strong winds created by Anshar and Kishar blow the boat off course and strand the men on the island created by the gods. Peter is angry at Ray for getting them stranded, and Ray returns the anger. As a result of this, Anshar and Kishar possess the two Ghostbusters. Every time they start arguing, they mutate into the gods, getting bigger and meaner each successive time. Egon, Winston and Slimer must find a way to de-possess them before their friends kill each other.
135	15	"Busters in Toyland (Note: Aired alongside a rerun of "The Bogeyman is Back".)"	Stan Phillips; Will Meugniot	Mark McCorkle; Bob Schooley	November 17, 1990	140–512
The firehouse is the scene for a birthday party for Louis' nephew, Lawrence (Josh Keaton). Louis wants to get him a good gift, but he inadvertently buys three toys possessed by ghosts. They take Lawrence to Toyland and the Ghostbusters have to rescue him. Note: Final appearance of Louis Tully.
136	16	"The Magnificent Five (Note: Aired alongside a rerun of "Sticky Business".)"	Stan Phillips; Will Meugniot	Sean Roche	November 24, 1990	140–516
The Ghostbusters have a ghostly showdown with Black Bart (Ed Gilbert) in a Texan town.

==== Season 7 (1991; ABC Season 6) ====
No.	No. in season	Title	Directed by	Written by	Original air date	Prod. code
137	1 (Note: The show was now scaled back to a half-hour.)	"The Treasure of Sierra Tamale"	Stan Phillips	Jules Dennis; Richard Mueller	September 7, 1991	140–603
Peter's scheming dad is back with a plan to get rich by finding a treasure in Mexico. The others take a pass, but Ray and Slimer join him on the exciting and dangerous adventure.
138	2	"Not Now, Slimer!"	Stan Phillips	Len Janson; Chuck Menville	September 14, 1991	140–602
After getting yelled at by Peter for causing too many interruptions, Slimer has to contend with the ever-persistent Professor Dweeb by himself. Meanwhile, the Ghostbusters have to deal with a squid ghost created by the anger of the ghosts in the containment unit.
139	3	"Attack of the B-Movie Monsters"	Stan Phillips	Jules Dennis; Richard Mueller	September 21, 1991	140–605
The Ghostbusters and Slimer arrive in Tokyo, Japan to battle ghosts that resemble Japanese movie monsters.
140	4	"20,000 Leagues Under the Street"	Stan Phillips	Jules Dennis; Richard Mueller	October 5, 1991	140–601
New York City suffers an earthquake and giant insects. Peter is taken underground by the giant insects and meets their master, the Egyptian god Apshai, who plans to sacrifice him and destroy humanity. Only the Ghostbusters can stop him.

==== Slimer! sub-series (1988) ====
No.	Title	Directed by	Written by	Original air date
1a	"Slimer for Hire"	Arthur Vitello	Pat Allee; Ben Hurst	September 10, 1988
Slimer gets jobs working at the Ritz Cafe and walking dogs for Rudy. However, Professor Dweeb is after him with a Slime Sucking Machine.
1b	"Cruisin' for a Bruisin'"	Arthur Vitello	Dennis O'Flaherty	September 10, 1988
Mr. Grout hires Bruiser to make Fred stay in his hotel room, but Slimer tries to outsmart Bruiser, so he can get Fred to the Ghostbusters barbecue.
1c	"Nothing to Sneeze At"	Arthur Vitello	Don Dougherty	September 10, 1988
With the Ghostbusters sick, and resting in their beds upstairs, Slimer is left in charge of the firehouse – which means dealing with a hungry, noise-making Manx.
2a 13b	"A Mouse in the House"	Arthur Vitello	Len Janson; Chuck Menville	September 17, 1988; October 1, 1988
Manx chases a mouse around the firehouse, causing all kinds of havoc and Slimer gets blamed for.
2b	"Cash or Slime"	Arthur Vitello	Floyd Norman	September 17, 1988
Slimer goes to the department store to buy Chilly a gift for her birthday, but he has to deal with security guard dog Bruiser.
2c	"Doctor Dweeb, I Presume"	Arthur Vitello	Tony Marino	September 17, 1988
Slimer goes to the doctor's with Janine. When he smells food, he goes on an adventure through the hospital. As usual, Professor Dweeb is there to catch him. Slimer must avoid Professor Dweeb and be back before Janine gets out of the doctor's office.
3a	"Quickslimer Messenger Service"	Arthur Vitello	Dennys Hickey; Pamela McCoy	September 24, 1988
In need of money to buy ice cream, Slimer takes a job as a messenger for Rudy's Messenger Service. Professor Dweeb, seeing his opportunity to catch Slimer, calls Rudy's service and tells him he has some packages to be delivered. Slimer is soon on his way to the addresses, where Professor Dweeb has really laid out various traps to catch him.
3b	"Pigeon-Cooped"	Arthur Vitello	Temple Mathews	September 24, 1988
Slimer teaches a pigeon how to fly, all the while trying to keep it out of Manx's clutches.
3c	"Go-Pher It"	Arthur Vitello	Tony Marino	September 24, 1988
While doing some gardening work, Slimer must contend with a tulip-hungry gopher.
13a	"Scareface (Note: This segment, and a repeat of "A Mouse in the House" (without "A" in the title), were shown alongside a rerun of "Slimer, Is That You?".)"	Arthur Vitello	Charles Kaufman	October 1, 1988
Ghosts are partying on the 13th floor of Hotel Sedgewick. The party "dies" when two gangster-like ghosts, who work for Scareface, appear. Slimer tries pretending to be Scareface to get rid of the two – until the real Scareface arrives.
4a	"Sticky Fingers"	Arthur Vitello	Bob Forward	October 8, 1988
At the firehouse, Slimer attempts to wallpaper the kitchen in an effort to please the Ghostbusters, but Dweeb and Elizabeth are intent on stopping and capturing him.
4b	"Don't Tease the Sleaze"	Arthur Vitello	Dennys Hickey; Pamela McCoy	October 8, 1988
The Ghostbusters trap a foul-smelling, obnoxious ghost called "The Sleaze". Not heeding Ray's warning, Slimer accidentally lets The Sleaze out of the Containment Unit. Knowing the Ghostbusters will be back from a call, Slimer MUST get The Sleaze back into the Containment Unit before they return. With help from the Junior Ghostbusters, Slimer tries various schemes, including dressing as a woman, in order to recapture The Sleaze.
5a	"Room at the Top"	Arthur Vitello	Charles Kaufman	October 15, 1988
All Slimer wants is quiet, so he can read his new comic book. But with Peter snoring and Egon doing some experiments, the firehouse is way too noisy for some relaxing reading. Slimer decides to build himself a little shack on the firehouse roof, so he can have all the quiet he wants, but orange cat, Manx, is going to complicate things a bit.
5b	"Tea But Not Sympathy"	Arthur Vitello	Len Janson; Chuck Menville	October 15, 1988
Manx fakes being sick, and Slimer has to baby-sit him as he causes havoc around the firehouse.
5c	"Special Delivery"	Arthur Vitello	Floyd Norman; Leo Sullivan	October 15, 1988
Luigi asks Slimer to deliver a lavish spread for a party being held at Rafael's house, but Manx desires the food.
6a	"Out with Grout"	Arthur Vitello	Len Janson; Chuck Menville	October 22, 1988
In an effort to stop Mr. Grout from bossing them around, Slimer and Bud get him a job at the Uptown Hotel. When Professor Dweeb becomes the new manager of the Hotel Sedgewick, Slimer and Bud do everything they can to get Mr. Grout back.
6b	"Dr. Strangedog"	Arthur Vitello	Tony Marino	October 22, 1988
Slimer receives a "Super Duper Spy Kit" from a cereal company. He goes out for trouble and finds it. He overhears a mad scientist dog through a storm drain. Dr. Strangedog plans to turn humans into dogs' servants. Slimer must stop him, but a huge guard dog stands in his way.
9a	"The Dirty Half-Dozen (Note: This and "Movie Madness" were shown alongside a rerun of "Halloween II 1/2".)"	Arthur Vitello	Temple Mathews	October 29, 1988
Ghoullem and Zugg, the ghost gangsters from "Scareface", return from the South Pole to get revenge on Slimer. They put the Ghostbusters to sleep with a sleepwalking potion, and Slimer is the only one who can rescue them (which is just what Ghoullem and Zugg want). However, Slimer doesn't go unprepared, as he gets all his friends to help him.
9b	"Movie Madness"	Arthur Vitello	Robert Davenport	October 29, 1988
Slimer helps Bud clean the movie theater to get into his favorite movie for free. It's all but a pleasant monster movie – there's gummed-up seats, Professor Dweeb, and the movie monster.
7a	"Slimer's Silly Symphony"	Arthur Vitello	Don Dougherty	November 5, 1988
After going to a symphony with Slimer, Egon decides to give him a conductor's baton. This inspires Slimer to start (and conduct) his own symphony, with a little help from his friends. But Professor Dweeb crashes the party and makes things a little "bouncy" for Slimer.
7b	"Little Green Sliming Hood"	Arthur Vitello	Bob Forward	November 5, 1988
To stop Slimer from watching TV before bed, Peter convinces him to listen to the story of Little Red Riding Hood. Slimer imagines himself as Little Green Sliming Hood with his friends in the story. Professor Dweeb is the scientific Big Bad Wolf and Elizabeth is the Little Bad Wolf, Chilly as the hippest grandma, and Peter as the hunter.
7c	"Monkey See, Monkey Don't"	Arthur Vitello	Michael C. Gross; Ted Mann	November 5, 1988
Slimer has a run-in with the cops.
8a	"Beach Blanket Bruiser"	Arthur Vitello	Pat Allee; Ben Hurst	November 12, 1988
Bruiser tries to stop Slimer, who is sneaking into the beach.
8b	"Class Clown"	Arthur Vitello	Francis Moss	November 12, 1988
When Donald loses some scripts, Slimer flies to his school to give them back to him, but not after having a few encounters with Mrs. Stone, the school's tough guard.
8c	"Dog Days"	Arthur Vitello	Floyd Norman, Leo Sullivan	November 12, 1988
Slimer helps Fred pass obedience school.
11a	"Up Close and Too Personal"	Arthur Vitello	Bob Forward	November 19, 1988
Slimer uses his video camera to capture Manx in some rather embarrassing moments, much to Manx's dismay. When Slimer uses his camera to film a commercial for Luigi, Manx gets a revenge.
11b	"Sweet Revenge"	Arthur Vitello	Charles Kaufman	November 19, 1988
While Slimer is out trick-or-treating, Professor Dweeb (who is dressed up in a Slimer costume) has to deal with Slimer's chores and some ghosts who want revenge on Slimer.
12a	"Rainy Day Slimer"	Arthur Vitello	Dennys McCoy; Pamela Hickey	November 26, 1988
Since Slimer can't go to the amusement park because it's raining outside, he draws pictures of the amusement park and enters them to have a pretend visit to the park.
12b	"Slimer & the Beanstalk"	Arthur Vitello	Don Dougherty	November 26, 1988
As Peter reads Slimer the bedtime story of Jack and the Beanstalk, Slimer imagines himself and his friends in the story.
12c	"Space Case"	Arthur Vitello	Tony Marino	November 26, 1988
Slimer gives a vacationing space alien a tour of the city.
10a	"Show Dog Showdown"	Arthur Vitello	Len Janson; Chuck Menville	December 3, 1988
Slimer and Fred enter a dog show in an effort to win food, competing against Dweeb and Elizabeth.
10b	"The Not-So-Great Outdoors"	Arthur Vitello	Len Janson; Chuck Menville	December 3, 1988
While on a camping trip, Slimer and Chilly encounter some mischief-loving rabbits.
10c	"Unidentified Sliming Object"	Arthur Vitello	Pat Allee; Ben Hurst	December 3, 1988
Two spacemen mistaking Slimer for a typical Earthling capture him and take him to their home.

== Crossover special (1990) ==
Title	Directed by	Written by	Original air date (U.S.)	U.K. air date
Cartoon All-Stars to the Rescue	Directed by: Milton Gray; Marsh Lamore; Bob Shellhorn; Mike Svayko; Supervising director: Karen Peterson	Duane Poole; Tom Swale	April 21, 1990	June 22, 1990
Michael, a young teenage boy, is using marijuana and stealing his father's beer. His younger sister, Corey, is constantly worried about him because he started acting differently. When her piggy bank goes missing, her cartoon tie-in toys come to life to help her find it. After discovering it in Michael's room along with his stash of drugs, the cartoon characters (one of whom is Slimer) proceed to work together and take him on a fantasy journey to teach him the risks and consequences a life of drug abuse can bring.

== Sony DVD release ==
From July 5 to September 6, 2016, Sony Pictures Home Entertainment have released most of the series (approximately 80% complete) in 10 volumes. A total of 29 episodes are missing throughout this release of the series, leaving all seasons incomplete with the exception of Season 4. Season 7, as well as the Slimer! sub-series, are omitted entirely.

The Real Ghostbusters home video releases
Season	Episodes	Years active	Completed/ Incomplete	Release dates
Season	Episodes	Years active	Completed/ Incomplete	Region 1
1	13	1986	Incomplete	Volume 1: July 5, 2016; Episodes: Entire season included, excluding: "Slimer, Come Home" (ep. missing: 1)
2	65	1987	Incomplete	Volume 2: July 5, 2016; Episodes: "Knock, Knock" – "Cry Uncle" • "Night Game" – "A Fright at the Opera" (ep. missing: 1) Volume 3: July 5, 2016; Episodes: "Doctor, Doctor" – "You Can't Take It With You" Volume 4: July 5, 2016; Episodes: "No One Comes to Lupusville" – "Janine Melnitz, Ghostbuster" Volume 5: July 5, 2016; Episodes: "Apocalypse—What, Now?" – "Ghost Fight at the O.K. Corral" Volume 6: September 6, 2016; Episodes: "Ghostbuster of the Year" – "The Devil to Pay" Volume 7: September 6, 2016; Episodes: "Slimer, Is That You?" – "Captain Steel Saves the Day" • "Egon's Dragon" – "The Hole in the Wall Gang" (ep. missing: 1)
3	13	1987	Incomplete	Volume 7: September 6, 2016; Episodes: "Baby Spookums" – "Once Upon a Slime" • "Sticky Business" (ep. missing: 1) Volume 8: September 6, 2016; Episodes: "Halloween II 1/2" – "The Grundel" • "The Copycat" – "Transylvanian Homesick Blues"(ep. missing: 1)
4	8	1988	Completed	Volume 8: September 6, 2016; Episodes: "The Joke's on Ray" – "Standing Room Only" Volume 9: September 6, 2016; Episodes: "Robo-Buster" – "The Brooklyn Triangle"
5	21	1989	Incomplete	Volume 9: September 6, 2016; Episodes: "Trading Faces" • "Elementary My Dear Winston" • "Partners in Slime" • "Three Men and an Egon" • "If I Were a Witch Man", "Jailbusters" • "Future Tense" Volume 10: September 6, 2016; Episodes: "The Halloween Door" • "The Ghostbusters! Live, from Al Capone's Tomb!" (ep. missing: 3)
6	16	1990	Incomplete	Volume 10: September 6, 2016; Episodes: "Janine, You've Changed" • "You Can't Teach an Old Demon New Tricks" • "Mean Green Teen Machine" • "The Slob" • "Afterlife in the Fast Lane" • "Stay Tooned" • "Busters in Toyland" • "The Magnificent Five" (ep. missing: 17)
