= Vincent Tubbs =

American journalist

- Born: September 25, 1915; Dallas, Texas
- Died: January 15, 1989 (aged 73); Los Angeles, Los Angeles County, California
- Education: Morehouse College
- Occupation: Journalist
- Spouse: Mamie Louise Hansberry (divorced)
- Children: Nantille Hansberry Tubbs

Vincent Tubbs (1915–1989) was a leading African American journalist, who became the first black person to head a motion picture industry union.

== Biography ==
Born Verley Trenton Tubbs Jr. in Dallas, Texas, on September 25, 1915, he later became known as Vincent Trenton Tubbs Jr.

While a student at Morehouse College, Tubbs was one of the founders of the Delta Phi Delta journalism fraternity. In March 1938, he launched National Negro Newspaper Week with Moss Hyles Kendrix and Bernard Milton Jones while they were newspaper editors of the Maroon Tiger at Morehouse. While at Morehouse Tubbs was initiated into Pi Chapter of Kappa Alpha Psi fraternity.

By the time Tubbs turned 26 years old, he had risen rapidly within the world of African American newspapers. While serving as bureau chief of the Richmond edition of the Norfolk Journal and Guide, P. B. Young, the paper's publisher, heard that Tubbs was talking to the Richmond Bureau chief of the Baltimore Afro-American and fired him. Tubbs was quickly hired by the Afro-American at a substantial pay increase. While there, Tubbs was given the challenging assignment of covering lynchings.

As a "lynch reporter," Tubbs could be called at a moment's notice to go to a remote location in the South, never sure if he would be able to find local transportation, lodging or anything resembling a hospitable environment. He would usually arrive by bus one town early to remove his city clothes and try his best to blend in with the local community. It didn't always work. In the early 1940s, Tubbs was spotted by a sheriff in the border town of Texarkana, Arkansas, who ordered him into his patrol car and took him to the chief of police. After being interrogated for several minutes, Tubbs was ordered to leave the state in five minutes.

During World War II, he was one of the few black war correspondents. Tubbs covered North Africa and the South Pacific from 1943 to 1945 for the Afro-American. After the war, he became the paper's assistant managing editor. While in Baltimore, Tubbs was the Polemarch of the Baltimore (MD) Alumni Chapter of Kappa Alpha Psi.

In April 1954, he married Chicago socialite Mamie Louise Hansberry, daughter of wealthy apartment house owner Carl Augustus Hansberry. This union produced a daughter, Nantille Hansberry Tubbs. His granddaughter is actress Taye Hansberry.

From 1955 to 1959, he served as managing editor of Jet magazine. After leaving Jet, he moved to Los Angeles, where he worked for the publicity department at Warner Brothers Studios. After A. S. "Doc" Young, he became one of the first African American publicists in Hollywood.

In 1967, he was elected as president of the Hollywood Publicists Guild. It was the first time that an African American had headed a motion picture guild. Also in the 1960s, Tubbs helped found the United Television Movie Equity Guild to help minorities in motion picture technical fields.

Tubbs was elected president of the Black Filmmakers Hall of Fame in 1979.

He died of a heart attack in his Los Angeles home on January 15, 1989.
