= William Leo Hansberry =

American historian (1894–1965)

- Born: February 25, 1894; Gloster, Mississippi, U.S.
- Died: November 3, 1965 (aged 71)
- Education: Atlanta University, Harvard University
- Occupations: historian, anthropologist
- Children: 2 (including Gail)
- Parent(s): Elden Hayes Hansberry; Harriet Pauline Bailey
- Relatives: Carl Hansberry (brother); Lorraine Hansberry (niece)

William Leo Hansberry (February 25, 1894 – November 3, 1965) was an American scholar, lecturer and pioneering African history scholar He was the older brother of real estate broker Carl Augustus Hansberry, uncle of award-winning playwright Lorraine Hansberry and great-granduncle of actress Taye Hansberry.

== Life and career ==
Hansberry was born on February 25, 1894, in Gloster, Amite County, Mississippi. He was the son of Elden Hayes Hansberry and Pauline (Bailey) Hansberry. His father was a professor of agriculture at Alcorn A&M in Lorman, Mississippi, but died when the younger Hansberry was only three years old. He and his younger brother, Carl Augustus Hansberry, were raised by their stepfather, Elijah Washington.

In 1915, he attended Atlanta University, where he was exposed to a new volume of essays on race (published by the university's Sociology Department), which served as a major influence on him. Another big influence was the book, "The Negro" by W. E. B. Du Bois. After he purchased a copy of the book, he rushed to the school's library to refer to the references cited in the volume. To his dismay, Hansberry discovered Atlanta University's reference library to be sorely lacking. As a result, he left Atlanta University two weeks into his sophomore year to transfer to the best-equipped university he could find that would admit blacks. As a result, he began studies at Harvard University in February 1917; he completed his undergraduate studies there in 1921.

Upon his graduation from Harvard, Hansberry taught for a year at Straight College (now Dillard University) in New Orleans. In September 1922, Hansberry joined the faculty of Howard University where he started the African Civilization Section of the History Department.

Hansberry received his master's degree from Harvard in 1932. Additional post-graduate work was done at the University of Chicago, Oxford University and Cairo University. His knowledge of African studies was so vast that he was unable to obtain a Ph.D. because there was no school with faculty members qualified to supervise his dissertation.

As a professor at Howard, Hansberry taught courses on African civilizations and cultures. By the mid-1930s, he was internationally recognized by his peers as an outstanding scholar in his field. Among his students were two future African leaders. One was the future Ghanaian revolutionary, Kwame Nkrumah. Nkrumah would later become the first prime minister and president of Ghana. The other was Nnamdi Azikiwe, who studied anthropology under him from 1928 to 1929 and wrote a eulogy for him. Azikiwe would become the first president of Nigeria. In 1961, then-Nigerian Governor-General Azikiwe thought Hansberry's work so important that he offered to underwrite the publication of his major work, The Rise and Decline of the Ethiopian Empire.

Although Hansberry's courses were very popular with students, two distinguished faculty members accused Hansberry of teaching subject matter without adequate research to support it. With the program and his job on the line, Hansberry presented the board of trustees with detailed documentation of his research. While he managed to save the African studies program, Hansberry's research funding was cut off and he would not receive tenure until 1938.

Despite the extensive research he conducted over his lifetime, Hansberry was very reluctant to have his work published. James Williams, one of his former students and later a Senior Professor of African History at Howard, recalled in 1972 that when his students urged publication of his work, Hansberry would smile, but always firmly reply, "I am not ready yet." Hansberry retired from Howard in June 1959.

He married Myrtle Kelso (September 24, 1908—May 1980) of Meridian, Lauderdale County, Mississippi, on June 22, 1937, in Chicago. She is the daughter of Wiley and Mamie Kelso. Two children were born to this union:

- Gail Adelle Hansberry
- Myrtle Kay Hansberry

While visiting relatives in Chicago, Hansberry died at Billings Hospital of a cerebral hemorrhage on November 3, 1965.

William Leo Hansberry was a member of Alpha Phi Alpha fraternity.

== Legacy ==
In 1963, the University of Nigeria, Nsukka opened the Hansberry College of African Studies as a graduate institution. Hansberry was both the college's namesake and its first director, though the role was non-resident. The college continues today as the Institute of African Studies.

Howard named a lecture hall in his honor in 1972. Howard's Department of African Studies began a new annual speaker series in 2023 titled the Frazier–Hansberry Lecture, named for longtime Howard sociologist E. Franklin Frazier and Hansberry.

== Relevant literature ==
- Alford, Kwame Wes. "The early intellectual growth and development of William Leo Hansberry and the birth of African studies." Journal of Black Studies 30, no. 3 (2000): 269–293.
- Azikiwe, Nnamdi. "Eulogy On William Leo Hansberry." Negro History Bulletin 29, no. 3 (1965): 63.
- Faraji, Salim. "REDISCOVERING THE LINKS BETWEEN THE EARTHEN PYRAMIDS OF WEST AFRICA AND ANCIENT NUBIA: RESTORING WILLIAM LEO HANSBERRY'S VISION OF ANCIENT KUSH AND SUDANIC AFRICA AND ANCIENT NUBIA: RESTORING WILLIAM LEO HANSBERRY'S VISION." Journal of Ancient Egyptian Interconnections 35 (2022).
- Hansberry, William Leo. "The Material Culture of Ancient Nigeria." The Journal of Negro History 6, no. 3 (1921): 261–295.
- Hansberry, William Leo. 1974. Pillars in Ethiopian History: The William Leo Hansberry African History Notebook, vol. 1, edited by Joseph E. Harris. Washington, DC: Howard University Press.
- Smyke, Raymond J. "William Leo Hansberry: Tribute to a Heretic." Africa Report 10, no. 10 (1965): 28.
- Spady, James G. "Dr. William Leo Hansberry: The Legacy of an African Hunter." A Current Bibliography on African Affairs 3, no. 11-12 (1970): 25–40.
- Young, Brenda Joyce. Baldwin and Hansberry as" privileged speakers": Two black writers and the Civil Rights Movement, 1955-1965. Emory University, 1996.
