= Carl Augustus Hansberry =

American activist and businessman (1895–1946)

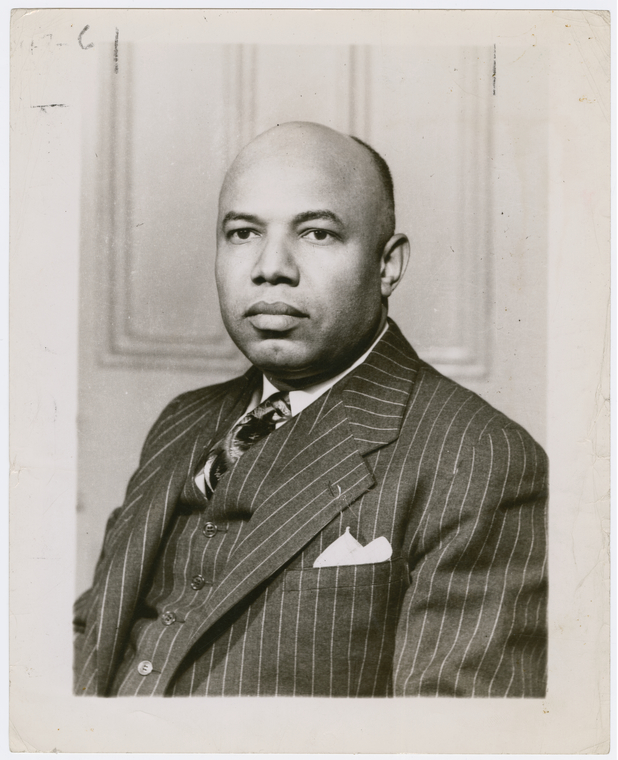
Hansberry in 1940

Carl Augustus Hansberry (April 30, 1895 – March 17, 1946) was an American real estate broker and political activist who was the plaintiff in the 1940 Supreme Court decision Hansberry v. Lee. He was also the father of playwright Lorraine Hansberry and the great-grandfather of actress Taye Hansberry.

== Life and career ==
Carl Augustus Hansberry was born on April 30, 1895, in Gloster, Amite County, Mississippi. He was a son of Elden Hayes Hansberry and Pauline (Bailey) Hansberry. He and his older brother, William Leo Hansberry, were raised by their stepfather, Elijah Washington. As a young man, Hansberry moved to Chicago, as part of the Great Migration.

He married Nannie Louise Perry of Columbia, Tennessee, the daughter of George Perry, a minister, and his wife, Charlotte "Lottie" Organ. Together Carl and Nannie had four children:

- Carl Augustus Hansberry Jr. (February 19, 1920 – January 12, 1997)
- Perry Holloway Hansberry (June 4, 1921 – December 18, 2002)
- Mamie Louise Hansberry (born April 2, 1923), former wife of journalist Vincent Tubbs and grandmother of actress Taye Hansberry
- Lorraine Vivian Hansberry (May 19, 1930 – January 12, 1965)

When his youngest child was eight years old, Hansberry bought a house in the Washington Park Subdivision of Chicago that was restricted to whites. The family was met with intense hostility by local residents. The Kenwood Improvement Association filed a mandatory injunction for the Hansberry family to vacate their home which was granted by a Circuit Court judge and upheld on appeal by the Illinois Supreme Court. Hansberry challenged the ruling, which led to the landmark U. S. Supreme Court case Hansberry v. Lee (1940). In a unanimous opinion rendered November 12, 1940, the court rejected the specific restrictive covenant impacting the Hansberry family without ruling on the constitutionality of restrictive residential covenants in general.

Carl Hanberry also figured prominently as the plaintiff in the Civil Right case, Civil Action Case 234, filed against the Atchison, Topeka and Santa Fe Railroad Company, a case brought to the United States District Court Northern District of Illinois, Northern Division. At a time when Jim Crow laws were legal, Hanberry had purchased a first-class ticket from Chicago to Kansas City, Missouri, and from Kansas City to Ardmore Oklahoma. He occupied a first class Pullman car when he embarked on his journey on December 1, 1937, but two miles north of the Oklahoma border was ordered to vacate his seat and relocate to the 3rd class, and unsanitary, coach. The case was thrown out for lack of jurisdiction, as this was at the time considered a States Rights matter, not a Federal one.

In 1940, Hansberry made an unsuccessful bid for Congress. In the wake of that loss and frustrated by the pervasive racism in the United States, he made plans to move his family to Mexico. While visiting Mexico, Hansberry suffered a cerebral hemorrhage and died there on March 17, 1946.

He is buried at the Burr Oak Cemetery in Cook County, Illinois.

== Family legacy ==
After his death, his children Carl Augustus Hansberry Jr., Perry Hansberry and Lorraine Hansberry continued to pursue civil rights activism, in particular against the City of Chicago.

The family's experience with racial segregation would serve as the inspiration for his daughter Lorraine Hansberry's award-winning play, A Raisin in the Sun.
