= Black Filmmakers Hall of Fame =

American organization

The Black Filmmakers Hall of Fame, Inc. (BFHFI), was founded in 1974, in Oakland, California. It supported and promoted black filmmaking, and preserved the contributions by African-American artists both before and behind the camera. It also sponsored advance screenings of films by and about people of African descent and hosted the Oscar Micheaux Awards Ceremony, held each February, from 1974 to 1993, in Oakland.

The Hall started as the Black Filmmakers Hall of Fame in 1974, as an all-volunteer project of Oakland Museum of California's Cultural and Ethnics Affairs Guild. It grew quickly, incorporating as BFHFI in 1977.

In 2014, all its archives were given to the Black Film Center/Archive, within the College of Arts and Sciences at Indiana University Bloomington.

This is a partial list of inductees:

== Inductees ==
=== 1974 ===
- Alvin Childress (1907–1986)
- Lillian Cumber (1920–2002)
- Ossie Davis (1917–2005)
- Sammy Davis Jr. (1925–1990)
- Katherine Dunham (1909–2006)
- Theresa Harris (1906–1985)
- Eugene Jackson (1916–2001)
- William Marshall (1924–2003)
- Juanita Moore (1914–2014)
- Clarence Muse (1889–1979)
- Gordon Parks Sr. (1912–2006)
- Lincoln Theodore Perry (stage name Stepin Fetchit) (1902–1985)
- Beah Richards (1920–2000)
- Paul Robeson (1898–1976)
- Vincent Tubbs (1915–1989)
- Lorenzo Tucker (1907–1986)
- Leigh Whipper (1876–1975)

=== 1975 ===
- William D. Alexander (1916–1991)
- Eddie "Rochester" Anderson (1905-1977)
- Ruby Dee (1922–2014)
- Duke Ellington† (1899-1974)
- Joel Fluellen (1907-1990)
- Lorraine Hansberry† (1930-1965)
- Lena Horne (1917-2010)
- Allen Hoskins (1920–1980)
- Rex Ingram† (1895-1969)
- Hall Johnson† (1888–1970)
- Quincy Jones (1933-2024)
- Robert Earl Jones (1910-2006)
- Eartha Kitt (1927-2008)
- Abbey Lincoln (Aminata Moseka) (1930–2010)
- Hattie McDaniel† (1895–1952)
- Butterfly McQueen (1911–1995)
- Frederick O'Neal (1905-1992)
- Louis S. Peterson (1922–1998)
- Sidney Poitier (1927-2022)
- Fredi Washington (1903–1994)
- Joseph M. Wilcots

=== 1976 ===
- Josephine Baker† (1906-1975)
- Louise Beavers† (1902–1962)
- Harry Belafonte (1927-2023)
- Eubie Blake (1887–1983)
- Diahann Carroll (1935–2019)
- Alfred (Slick) Chester
- Bernie Hamilton (1928-2008)
- John O. Killens (1916-1987)
- Canada Lee† (1907-1952)
- Lucia Lynn Moses
- Fayard Nicholas (1914-2006) and Harold Nicholas (1921-2000) (Nicholas Brothers)
- Brock Peters (1927–2005)
- Melvin Van Peebles (1932–2021)
- Ethel Waters (1896-1977)

=== 1977 ===
- Roscoe Lee Browne (1922-2007)
- Dorothy Dandridge† (1922-1965)
- Bee Freeman
- Bernard Johnson
- James Earl Jones (1931-2024)
- Maidie Norman (1912–1998)
- Cicely Tyson (1924–2021)

=== 1978 ===
- Count Basie (1904-1984)
- Benny Carter (1907–2003)
- Nat King Cole† (1919-1965)
- Ella Fitzgerald (1917-1996)
- Nina Mae McKinney† (1912–1967)
- Bill "Bojangles" Robinson† (1878-1949)
- Hazel Scott (1920-1981)

=== 1979 ===
- Lonne Elder III (1927–1996)
- Earl "Fatha" Hines (1903–1983)
- Herb Jeffries (1913–2014)
- Etta Moten Barnett (1901–2004)
- Floyd Norman (born 1935) and *Leo D. Sullivan (1940–2023)
- Diana Sands† (1934–1973)
- Paul Winfield (1939–2004)

=== 1980 ===
- Vinnette Carroll (1922–2002)
- Ivan Dixon (1931–2008)
- James Edwards† (1918–1970)
- William Greaves (1926–2014)
- Lillian Randolph (1898–1980)
- Frank Silvera† (1914–1970)
- Woody Strode (1914–1994)

=== 1981 ===
- Maya Angelou (1928-2014)
- Louis Gossett Jr. (1936-2024)
- Geoffrey Holder (1930-2014)
- Phil Moore (1918-1987)
- Raymond St. Jacques (1930-1990)

=== 1982 ===
- Cab Calloway (1907–1994)
- Jester Hairston (1901-2000)
- Yaphet Kotto (1939-2021)
- Hugh Robertson (1932-1988)

=== 1984 ===
- Carmen de Lavallade (1931-2025)
- Mantan Moreland† (1902-1973)
- Richard Pryor (1940-2005)
- Billy Dee Williams (born 1937)

=== 1985 ===
- Jim Brown (1936-2023)
- Gloria Foster (1933-2001)
- Robert Hooks (born 1937)

=== 1986 ===
- Moses Gunn (1929-1993)
- Madame Sul-Te-Wan† (1873–1959)

=== 1987 ===
- Scatman Crothers† (1910–1986)
- Jeni Le Gon (1916–2012)
- Ernie Morrison (Sunshine Sammy) (1912–1989)

=== 1988 ===
- Louis Armstrong† (1901-1971)
- Dizzy Gillespie (1917-1993)

=== 1989 ===
- Lola Falana (born 1942)
- Elisabeth Welch (1904-2003)

=== 1990 ===
- Suzanne de Passe (born 1948)
- Danny Glover (born 1946)

=== 1991 ===
- Esther Rolle (1920-1998)
- Michael Schultz (born 1938)

=== 1992 ===
- Madeline Anderson (born 1923/4)
- Rosalind Cash (1938–1995)
- Helen Martin (1909-2000)
- Denise Nicholas (born 1944)
- Madge Sinclair (1938-1995)

=== 1993 ===
- John Singleton (1968-2019)
- Katherine Dunham (1909-2006)
- Clarence Muse † (1889-1979)
- Gordon Parks (1912-2006)

† Awarded posthumously

== See also ==
- Black Reel Awards
- Mary Perry Smith

== Additional resources ==
- Indiana University maintains the Black Filmmakers Hall of Fame Archives.
