= The Real Ghostbusters =

American animated television series (1986–1991)

- Title card
- Also known as: Slimer! and the Real Ghostbusters (seasons 4–7)
- Genre: Supernatural; Science fiction comedy
- Based on: Ghostbusters by: Dan Aykroyd; Harold Ramis
- Developed by: Joe Medjuck; Michael C. Gross
- Voices of: Lorenzo Music; Maurice LaMarche; Frank Welker; Arsenio Hall; Dave Coulier; Buster Jones; Laura Summer; Kath Soucie; Rodger Bumpass; Jeff Altman
- Theme music composer: Ray Parker Jr.
- Opening theme: "Ghostbusters"
- Composers: Haim Saban (seasons 1–5); Shuki Levy (seasons 1–5); Thomas Chase Jones (seasons 6–7); Steve Rucker (seasons 6–7)
- Country of origin: United States
- Original language: English
- No. of seasons: 7
- No. of episodes: 140; + 33 (Slimer! spin-off shorts); (list of episodes)

Production
- Executive producers: Joe Medjuck; Michael C. Gross
- Producers: Jean Chalopin; Andy Heyward; Richard Raynis; Tetsuo Katayama
- Running time: 14–24 minutes
- Production companies: DIC Enterprises (Note: Animation outsourced to Wang Film Productions, TMS Entertainment, Toei Animation, Trans Arts, Dong Yang Animation, Plus One Animation, Ajia-do Animation Works, Sei Young Animation, Daiwon, Visual 80, Hanho Heung-Up and KK DiC Asia (later known as KK C&D Asia).); Columbia Pictures Television

Original release
- Network: ABC; Syndication (1987)
- Release: September 13, 1986 – October 5, 1991

Related
- Extreme Ghostbusters

The Real Ghostbusters is an American animated supernatural television series, a spin-off and sequel of the 1984 comedy film Ghostbusters. The series ran on ABC between September 13, 1986 and October 5, 1991, and was a joint production of DIC Enterprises in association with Columbia Pictures Television and distributed by Coca-Cola Telecommunications.

The series continues the adventures of paranormal investigators Dr. Peter Venkman, Dr. Egon Spengler, Dr. Ray Stantz, Winston Zeddemore, their secretary Janine Melnitz and their mascot ghost Slimer.

"The Real" was added to the title after a dispute with Filmation and its Ghost Busters properties.

There also were two ongoing Real Ghostbusters comics, one published monthly by NOW Comics in the United States and the other published weekly (originally biweekly) by Marvel Comics in the United Kingdom. Kenner produced a line of action figures and playsets based on the cartoon. In 2023, events from the series would be adapted for the canon video game Ghostbusters: Spirits Unleashed, in particular the character of Samhain.

== Plot ==
The series follows the continuing adventures of the four Ghostbusters, their secretary Janine Melnitz, their accountant Louis Tully, and their mascot Slimer, as they chase and capture rogue spooks, specters, spirits and ghosts around New York City and various other areas of the world.

=== Slimer! ===
At the start of the fourth season in 1988, the show was retitled to Slimer! and the Real Ghostbusters. It aired in a one-hour time slot, which the show had begun doing under its original name earlier that same year on January 30, 1988. In addition to the regular 30-minute Real Ghostbusters episode, a half-hour Slimer! sub-series was added that included two to three short animated segments focusing on the character Slimer. Animation for the Slimer! cartoons was handled by Wang Film Productions. At the end of its seven-season run, 147 episodes had aired, including the syndicated episodes and 13 episodes of Slimer!, with multiple episodes airing out of production order.

== Voice cast ==
- Lorenzo Music as Peter Venkman (seasons 1–2)
- Dave Coulier as Peter Venkman (seasons 3–7)
- Maurice LaMarche as Egon Spengler
- Frank Welker as Ray Stantz, Slimer, the Stay Puft Marshmallow Man, Mayor Lenny Clotch, Manx, Scareface
- Arsenio Hall as Winston Zeddemore (seasons 1–3) (Note: Winston's last name was alternately spelled Zeddemore, as in the movies, and Zeddmore.)
- Buster Jones as Winston Zeddemore (seasons 4–7)
- Laura Summer as Janine Melnitz (seasons 1–2)
- Kath Soucie as Janine Melnitz (seasons 3–7)
- Rodger Bumpass as Louis Tully (seasons 5–6)
- Charlie Adler as Rafael
- Jeff Altman as Professor Norman Dweeb (seasons 4, 6–7)
- Fay DeWitt as Mrs. Van Huego (seasons 4–7)
- April Hong as Catherine
- Katie Leigh as Jason
- Danny Mann as Luigi, Bud
- Jeff Marder as Rudy
- William E. Martin as Samhain
- Danny McMurphy as Donald
- Alan Oppenheimer as Morris P. Grout, Goolem
- John Stocker as Stay Puft Marshmallow Man (season 3)
- Cree Summer as Chilly Cooper, Mrs. Stone

== Episodes ==
Season	Episodes	Originally released		
Season	Episodes	First released	Last released	Network
1	13	September 13, 1986	December 13, 1986	ABC
2	65	September 14, 1987	December 11, 1987	Syndication
3	13	September 12, 1987	December 12, 1987	ABC
Slimer!	33	September 10, 1988	December 3, 1988	ABC
4	8	September 10, 1988	December 3, 1988	ABC
5	21	September 9, 1989	December 23, 1989	ABC
6	16	September 8, 1990	November 24, 1990	ABC
7	4	September 7, 1991	October 5, 1991	ABC
Crossover		April 21, 1990		ABC; NBC; Fox; CBS; USA Network; Syndication

== Production ==
At the same time The Real Ghostbusters was being created, Filmation was making a cartoon revamp (Ghostbusters) of their 1975 live action series The Ghost Busters, due to disagreements with Columbia over animation rights.

A short pilot episode was produced, but never aired in full. The full 4-minute promo was released on Time Life's DVD set in 2008. Scenes of the pilot can be seen in TV promos that aired prior to the beginning of the series. Among differences seen in the promo pilot, the Ghostbusters wore beige jumpsuits as in the film and the character design for Peter Venkman bore more of a resemblance to actor Bill Murray. The character designs by Jim McDermott were dramatically different, with color-coded jumpsuits for each character. When he auditioned for the voice of Egon Spengler, Maurice LaMarche noted that while he was asked not to impersonate Harold Ramis, he did so anyway and eventually got the part. LaMarche also noted that Bill Murray had remarked off-handedly to producers that Lorenzo Music's voice for Peter Venkman sounded more like Garfield (who was also voiced by Music at the time). Murray went on to voice Garfield in Garfield: The Movie and its sequel in the 2000s after Music died in 2001. Dave Coulier took over the role of Venkman from Music starting in the third season. Coulier explained that Joe Medjuck, a producer on both the original 1984 film and the animated series, wanted the character to sound more like Murray. Ernie Hudson was the only actor from the films who auditioned to play his character in the series; however, the role was given to Arsenio Hall and later Buster Jones.

Although the Ghostbusters concept was tinkered with, the finalized show does feature many tie-ins from the films. In the season 1 episode "Take Two", the Ghostbusters fly to Hollywood to visit the set of a movie based on their adventures, which is revealed to be the 1984 movie at the end of the episode. The Stay Puft Marshmallow Man makes numerous appearances. During the third season, Walter Peck, the Environmental Protection Agency antagonist from the original film, reappears. The uniforms and containment unit are redesigned, and Slimer is changed from a bad ghost to a resident and friend, events which are explained in the episode "Citizen Ghost" that flashes back to what happened to the Ghostbusters right after the film's events. Gozer is mentioned repeatedly throughout the series, usually in comparison to a ghost they are currently battling (e.g. "Cthulhu makes Gozer look like Little Mary Sunshine").

In the second season, some of the character designs were modified. Ray's character design was slimmed down to give the character a less overweight appearance and Slimer was given a tail instead of the formerly rounded bottom (he reverted to a stub in Season 5). The biggest change was to the character of Janine, whose hair was completely changed from being short and spiky to long and straight. Her short skirts became longer and her small pointy eyeglasses were changed to big round eyeglasses. Her overall design was softened, as was her personality. Her voice was also softened with Kath Soucie taking over the voice role from Laura Summer. ABC also went back, and redubbed Peter's and Janine's dialogue in several episodes of the show with Dave Coulier and Kath Soucie, respectively. Changes to Janine's character were eventually addressed in the season 6 episode (#66) entitled, "Janine, You've Changed".

Most of these changes were the result of ABC hiring a consulting firm called Q5, in an attempt for guidance on improving the network's low ratings for their Saturday Morning lineup, a move strongly criticized by the show's writers J. Michael Straczynski (who was a story editor on the series and wrote episodes for every season except 3 and 6) and Michael Reaves. Many of the changes brought on by Q5 were even criticized by Straczynski as being racist and sexist, such as having each Ghostbuster have a specific role (such as a body, Peter being the mouth, Ray the heart, and Egon the brain) but making Winston (the only main African American character) the driver saying he is "the hands". Another example would be stating how the character of Janine needed to be "more nurturing", dressed in more "dress-like outfits" and made "less harsh and slutty".

At the start of the series' third season in 1988, the opening was completely redone to center around Slimer. Eventually the episodes were expanded from their original half-hour format to last an hour, and the overall feel of the show was changed to be more youthful, with episodes having a lighter tone to be less frightening.

By season 4, Louis Tully was added to the show following the character's appearance in Ghostbusters II.

=== Voice acting and animation ===
Recording for the show took place in Los Angeles, California. The cast always recorded together, instead of separately as is custom. After recording of the dialogue was completed, sound tapes, storyboards, backgrounds, and character designs were then shipped to Japanese animation studios for animation and filming. South Korean studios were also used during the final two seasons.

== Broadcast ==
The show originally aired on ABC for its full run, except for the 65 episode syndicated season, which ran in syndication at the same time as the official second season ran on ABC. Later, reruns of the show appeared on the USA Network's USA Cartoon Express from September 16, 1991 to September 11, 1994. For a short time in August 1997, the series returned to syndication as part of Bohbot Entertainment's Amazin' Adventures as anticipation for Extreme Ghostbusters which was planned to air on the block. Fox Family Channel also reran the series from August 17, 1998 to October 1, 1999. In August 2012, reruns began airing on Fearnet during the weekends, part of their "Funhouse" block, and on April 1, 2017, the show began to stream on Netflix, but was removed two years later. Then the show aired in Spanish on TeleXitos from 2022 to 2023. As of June 25, 2024, the show is currently airing on MeTV Toons. It aired on ITV in the U.K. in February 1988.

To celebrate the release of Ghostbusters: Afterlife, both The Real Ghostbusters and Extreme Ghostbusters were released onto the official Ghostbusters YouTube channel.

== Media ==
The Real Ghostbusters soundtrack was released in 1986 on CD, records, and cassette by PolyGram Records. All songs were performed by Tahiti (Tyren Perry & Tonya Townsend).

From 1986 to 1989, several episodes were released by Magic Window, the children's imprint of RCA/Columbia Pictures Home Video. The episodes on the cassettes were from the first season of syndication.

In 2004 and again in 2006, Sony released bare bones episode compilations in the United Kingdom and United States, respectively. The DVD release of Ghostbusters II also included two episodes of the series as bonus features, "Citizen Ghost", a story focusing on events set immediately after the first movie, and "Partners in Slime" (this episode has the original broadcast version and the original end logos—DiC "kid in bed" and Columbia Pictures Television (1988) logos, respectively), which featured the psycho-active slime from Ghostbusters II and a brief mention of its villain Vigo the Carpathian.

Time Life acquired the home video rights to the series in May 2008 and released a complete series on DVD in the fall of 2008. That July they allowed fans the chance to vote between two variations of an outer box for the set—one designed to look like the main characters' firehouse headquarters and the other all black with different images on each side. Both featured lenticular printing, the firehouse version to show the Ecto-1 and the black version to have oozing "slime". Released on November 25, 2008, in the "firehouse" casing, the set spans 25 discs containing all 147 episodes of the series. They subsequently began releasing the individual volumes on March 31, 2009, but only the first three were released. Volumes 4 and 5 were not released due to poor sales. The Time Life releases have been discontinued and are now out of print.

Sony began re-releasing the series on DVD in Region 1 in 2016. Volumes 1–5 (each containing 11 or 12 episodes) were released on July 5, while Volumes 6–10 (with 10 or 11 episodes each) were released on September 6. Unlike the previous Time Life edition, the Sony release is incomplete, missing 29 episodes that were inexplicably omitted, as well as the entire Slimer! sub-series. Additionally, title cards were removed from all episodes in the first five volumes (title and writer credits were superimposed over the animated opening). All 10 volumes, spanning 10 discs containing 111 episodes, were released in a slim plastic box set in October 2017 (comprising 80% of the series).

The complete first season was released on DVD in Australia on June 3, 2009, and in the U.K. on June 15.

== Spin-off: Extreme Ghostbusters ==
In 1997, a sequel cartoon entitled Extreme Ghostbusters was produced by Columbia TriStar Television and Adelaide Productions. It premiered on September 1, 1997, and ran for forty episodes until its conclusion on December 8. Set many years after the end of The Real Ghostbusters, the series opened by saying the team has disbanded due to a lack of supernatural activity. Only Egon remains in the firehouse, along with Slimer, to care for the containment system while teaching classes at a local university. When supernatural events begin occurring in New York, Egon recruits four of his university students as a new team of Ghostbusters, and Janine, also one of Egon's students, returns to manage the office. The original Ghostbusters return for the two-episode season finale to celebrate Egon's 40th birthday, leading to them reluctantly working together with the younger generation to solve one last case.

== Reception ==
The series has received critical acclaim since its premiere. The first season received an approval rating of 100% on review aggregator Rotten Tomatoes, based on five reviews. Common Sense Media gave the series a three out of five stars: "Parents need to know that The Real Ghostbusters is an animated series spun off the mega-popular 1984 movie Ghostbusters (the 'Real' was added to avoid confusion with an unrelated cartoon of the same name). The core characters remain the same, though the cartoon is skewed toward younger kids and as such, drops the swearing, the smoking, and the sexual innuendo. While the Ghostbusters do spend their days vanquishing evil, the monsters and phantoms they encounter are often quite silly (some of them even make wisecracks) and not too scary".

== See also ==
- Ghostbusters (1986 TV series)
- The Ghost Busters
