= Lillian Cumber =

Lillian Cumber (née Victoria Lillian Fisher, April 1, 1920 - 2002) was an African American columnist, gospel music group booking agent, and an agent for actors in Hollywood. She represented African American actors. She was inducted into the Black Filmmakers Hall of Fame in 1974.

Cumber worked as a secretary for Walter L. Gordon and then was a newspaper columnist for 25 years. She worked with Art Rupe, booking gospel performers at Herald Attractions. After six years together she left in 1956 after a disagreement. and founded the Lil Cumber Attraction Agency for African American actors. She was the first African American woman to represent actors in the film industry. In 1958, Jet reported she closed her booking agency to enter UCLA Law School. Also in 1958, she was engaged to marry drug store chain owner Ed Fisher.

She helped cast Horace Jackson's film Living Between Two Worlds. Marla Gibbs described meeting with her.

It took her five years to get a license from the Screen Actors Guild. Her clients included Eddie Cole.

== Additional resources ==
- The UCLA Library maintains photographs of Lillian Cumber.
- Archive.org maintains a copy of Lillian Cumber's bio from the Black Filmmakers Hall of Fame.
