= Gail Hansberry =

American artist

Gail Adelle Hansberry
- Born: September 4, 1939 (age 86); Washington, D.C.
- Known for: graphic artist, photographer, educator

Gail Hansberry (born 1939) is an American artist and educator.

== Early life and education ==
Hansberry was born in Washington, D.C., on September 4, 1939, to Myrtle (Kelso) and William Hansberry. She is the cousin of the playwright Lorraine Hansberry. She attended Howard University receiving her B.A. in 1960, and Smith College receiving her master's degree in 1962.

== Career ==
Hansberry started her career teaching art in Washington, D.C., at Taft Junior High School. She went on to teach art history at North Carolina College. By 1966 Hansberry moved to New York where she worked as a researcher at Time-Life Books and as a freelance photographer. In 1980 she returned to Washington, D.C., where she worked for the United States Department of State as an English language officer. From 1990 through 1992 Hansberry served as the Director of the Association for the Study of African American Life and History.

== Legacy ==
In 2017 Hansberry's work was included in the exhibition Legacy, The 2017 African American Art Exhibit at the Friendship Gallery in Chevy Chase, Maryland. Her prints and handmade books are held in collections both private and public, including at the North Carolina Museum of Art, Smith College, the Library of Congress, and the Schomburg Center for Research in Black Culture.
