= Leo D. Sullivan =

American animator (1940–2023)

Leo D. Sullivan (c. 1940 – March 25, 2023) was an American writer and director of animated films, and a pioneer in black animation. With Floyd Norman, who he met working on Beanie and Cecil, he launched Vignette Films, later Vignette Multimedia, and worked on the original animated Soul Train logo. They also produced short films geared toward a high school audience on leaders in the African-American community.

Sullivan worked for Bob Clampett Productions as an animation cel polisher before moving up to working as an artist and animator. Over a more than sixty year career, he and his wife collaborated on improving animation for black children. His company, Leo Sullivan Multimedia, is behind brands such as AfroKids.

Sullivan and Norman's work was recognized by the Black Filmmakers Hall of Fame in 1991 and Sullivan received an Emmy in 1992 as a Timing Director. Interviews of Sullivan are featured prominently in the documentary Floyd Norman: An Animated Life (2016) by Michael Fiore.

Leo D. Sullivan died on March 25, 2023, in Los Angeles, California, USA, of heart failure.

== Filmography ==
- Round Trip to the Moon (1972)
- Examining the Moon (1972)
- Men to Meet the Challenge (1972)
- Living in Space (1972)
