= Floyd Norman =

American animator and cartoonist

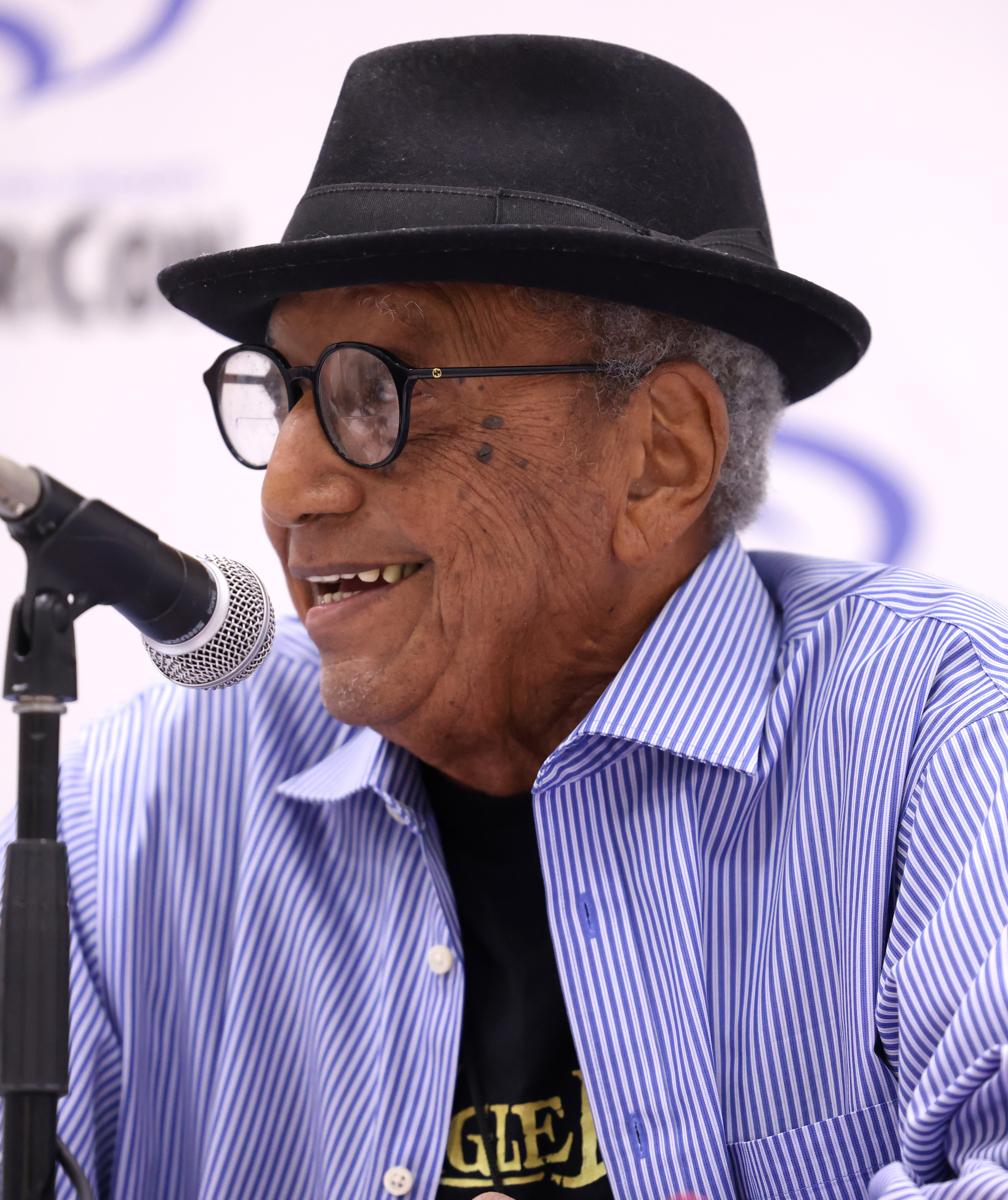
- Norman in 2026
- Born: Floyd Ernest Norman; June 22, 1935 (age 91); Santa Barbara, California, U.S.
- Notable work: Sleeping Beauty; The Sword in the Stone; The Jungle Book; Mary Poppins; One Hundred and One Dalmatians; Toy Story 2 Monsters, Inc. Mickey Mouse comic strip
- Title: Animator, writer, artist, cartoonist
- Website: http://floydnormancom.squarespace.com

Signature
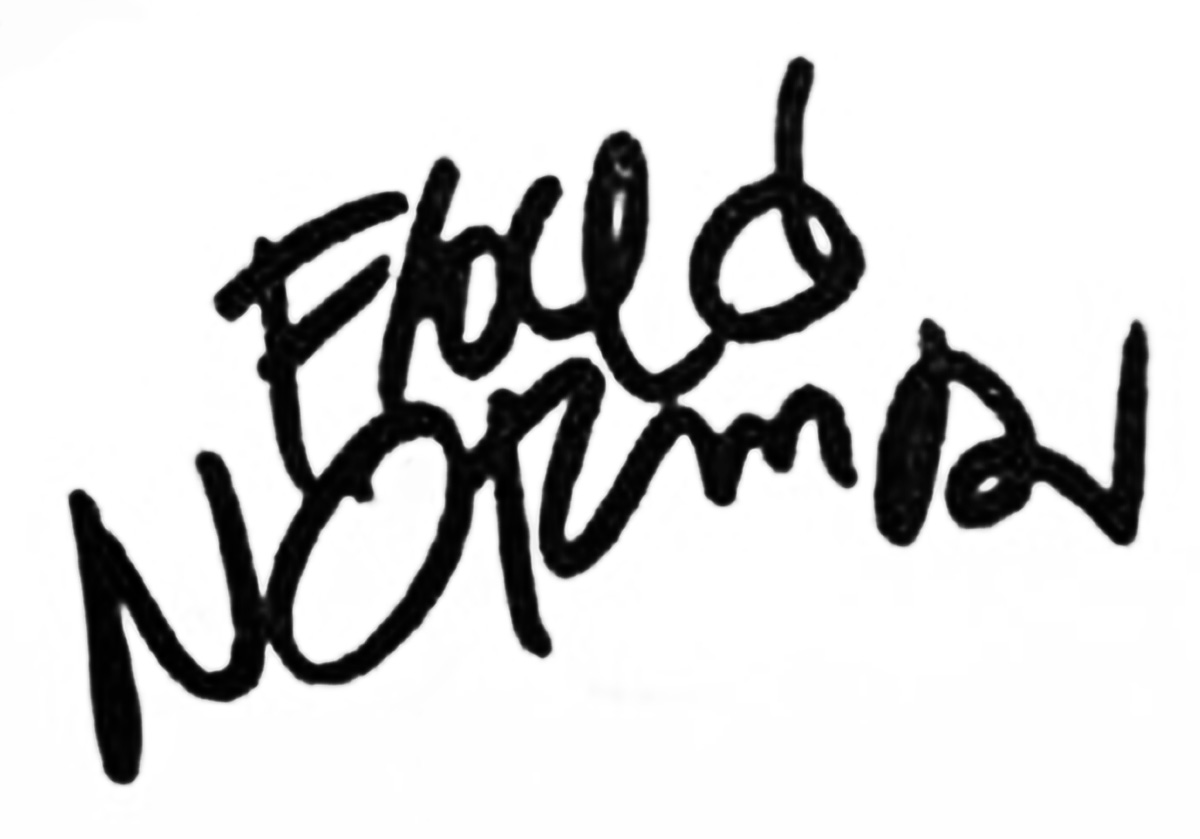

Floyd Ernest Norman (born June 22, 1935) is an American animator, writer, artist and cartoonist. Over the course of his career, he has worked for various animation companies, among them Walt Disney Animation Studios, Hanna-Barbera Productions, Ruby-Spears, Film Roman and Pixar. Norman received an Academy Honorary Award at the 2026 Governor Awards for his cinematic contributions.

== Life and career ==
Norman's love for animated pictures started in his childhood when he watched the Disney feature films Dumbo and Bambi. Norman grew up in Santa Barbara, California and attended Santa Barbara High School before attending Art Center College of Design in Pasadena, California, where he majored in illustration. He had his start as an assistant to Katy Keene comic book artist Bill Woggon, who lived in the Santa Barbara, California, area. In 1957, Norman was employed as an inbetweener on Sleeping Beauty (released in 1959) at The Walt Disney Company, becoming the first African-American artist to remain at the studio on a long-term basis. Following his work on Sleeping Beauty, Norman was drafted, and returned to the studio after his service in 1960 to work on One Hundred and One Dalmatians (1961) and The Sword in the Stone (1963). After Walt Disney saw some of the inter-office sketches Norman made to entertain his co-workers, he was reassigned to the story department, where he worked with Larry Clemmons on the story for The Jungle Book.

Norman had nothing but fond memories of Walt Disney and has denied over the years that he was ever antisemitic or racist. In an interview, he promptly declared, "Spike Lee, who I respect a great deal as a filmmaker, made a comment once about Walt being a racist, and I'd have to say Spike, you never met Walt. I did."

After Walt Disney died in 1966, Floyd Norman left the Disney studio to co-found Vignette Films, Inc., with business partner animator/director Leo Sullivan. Vignette Films, Inc. produced six animated films and was one of the first companies to produce films on the subject of black history. Norman and Sullivan worked together on various projects, including segments for Sesame Street and the original Hey, Hey, Hey, It's Fat Albert television special conceived by Bill Cosby, which aired in 1969 on NBC. In 1972, a different Fat Albert and the Cosby Kids Saturday morning cartoon series was produced for CBS by Filmation Associates.

Norman returned to Disney at one point in the early 1970s to work on the Disney animated feature Robin Hood, and worked on several animated television programs at Hanna-Barbera and Ruby-Spears. In the 1980s he worked as a writer in the comic strip department at Disney and was the last scripter for the Mickey Mouse comic strip before it was discontinued.

He has worked on motion pictures for Walt Disney Animation Studios and Pixar, having contributed creatively as a story artist on films such as The Hunchback of Notre Dame, Mulan and Dinosaur for Walt Disney Animation Studios and Toy Story 2 and Monsters, Inc. for Pixar among others, including Reel FX's Free Birds.

Norman has also published several books of cartoons inspired by his lifetime of experiences in the animation industry, Faster! Cheaper!: The Flip Side to the Art of Animation ISBN 9780942909029; Son of Faster, Cheaper!: A Sharp Look Inside the Animation Business ISBN 9781881368373; How the Grinch Stole Disney ISBN 9781881368380; Disk Drive: Animated Humor in the Digital Age; and Suspended Animation: The Art Form That Refuses To Die.

Norman has also authored a semi-biographical animation primer, titled: Animated Life: A Lifetime of Tips, tricks, techniques and Stories from an Animation Legend (Animation Masters) ISBN 0240818059, that was published by Focal Press in 2013. He is the subject of the 2016 documentary Floyd Norman: An Animated Life.

He is a columnist for the websites JimHillMedia.com and AfroKids.com.

In 2016 Norman was appointed to the education and outreach committee of the Academy of Motion Picture Arts & Sciences.

Debuting at the 2017 D23 Expo, Disney Editions published the picture book A Kiss Goodnight ISBN 9781484782286 written by Richard M. Sherman and illustrated by Norman.

Norman was also part of a Members Only Preview for the behind-the-scenes exhibition titled Walt Disney’s The Jungle Book: Making a Masterpiece during a special talk alongside Andreas Deja, Darleen Carr and Bruce Reitherman which took place on June 22, 2022. The exhibition took place at The Walt Disney Family Museum from June 23, 2022, to January 8, 2023.

== Awards and honors ==
Norman was inducted into the Black Filmmakers Hall of Fame in 1979. Norman was a recipient of the Winsor McCay Award for "recognition of lifetime or career contributions to the art of animation" at the 2002 Annie Awards. Norman was named a Disney Legend in 2007. In 2008, he appeared as Guest of Honor at San Diego Comic-Con, where he was given an Inkpot Award. In 2013 Norman was honored with the "Sergio Award" from The Comic Art Professional Society (CAPS). in 2014, Norman was the recipient of the DFC Disney Legend award given by the Disneyana Fan Club. In 2015 Norman received the Friz Freleng Award for Lifetime Achievement for Excellence in Animation from the International Family Film Festival. In 2016, Norman was the recipient of the Special Achievement Award (Legendary Animator) from the African-American Film Critics Association. In June 2018, Norman received an honorary Doctorate of Philosophy degree from Cogswell Polytechnical College. In May 2019, Norman was honored with the Milton Caniff Lifetime Achievement Award from the National Cartoonists Society. In 2021, Norman was inducted into the Society of Illustrators Hall of Fame In 2026, he was announced as the recipient of an Academy Honorary Award.

== Filmography ==
=== Film ===
Year	Title	Notes
1959	Sleeping Beauty	clean-up artist/in between artist (uncredited)
1961	One Hundred and One Dalmatians	animator of Kanine Krunchies commercial (uncredited)
1963	The Sword in the Stone	assistant animator (uncredited)
1967	The Jungle Book	story artist (uncredited)
1973	Robin Hood	assistant animator (uncredited)
1979	Scooby Goes Hollywood	layout artist
1994	Scooby-Doo! in Arabian Nights	storyboard artist
1994	A Flintstones Christmas Carol	storyboard artist
1996	The Hunchback of Notre Dame	story
1998	Mulan	story
1999	Toy Story 2	additional story artist
2000	The Tigger Movie	additional story artist
2000	Dinosaur	story artist
2001	Monsters, Inc.	additional story artist
2002	Cinderella II: Dreams Come True	additional story artist
2005	Kronk's New Groove	additional story artist
2013	Free Birds	additional story artist
2022	Mickey: The Story of a Mouse	himself

=== Television ===
Year	Title	Notes
1969	Skyhawks	Animator
1969	Hot Wheels	Animator
1969	Hey, Hey, Hey, It's Fat Albert	Cell artist (uncredited)
1970	Josie and the Pussycats	Layout Artist
1972	Sealab 2020	Layout Artist
1973	Goober and the Ghost Chasers	Layout Artist
1974	Wheelie and the Chopper Bunch	Layout Artist
1976	Jabberjaw	animator
1977	I Am the Greatest: The Adventures of Muhammad Ali	Layout Artist
1977	Laff-A-Lympics	Layout Artist
1978	Yogi's Space Race	Layout Artist
1978–1979	Godzilla	key layout artist
1981	The Kwicky Koala Show	story director
1981–1989	The Smurfs	layout artist/story director/storyboard artist
1981	Super Friends	Key Layout Artist
1982	Pac-Man	layout artist
1984	Alvin and the Chipmunks	story director/layout artist
1984–1987	Snorks	story director
1987	Beverly Hills Teens	storyboard artist
1988–1994	Garfield and Friends	storyboard artist
2002	Courage the Cowardly Dog	storyboard artist
2008	Click and Clack's As the Wrench Turns	storyboard artist
2013	The High Fructose Adventures of Annoying Orange	storyboard artist
2015	Robot Chicken	storyboard artist
2020	Pawn Stars	appeared as himself, episode: "I Don't Give a Dime"
