= 1995 in literature =

This article contains information about the literary events and publications of 1995.

== Events ==
- January 12 – The première of Sarah Kane's complete Blasted at the Royal Court Theatre Upstairs in London provokes outrage.
- February 28 – The Diary of Bridget Jones column first appears in The Independent newspaper (London).
- March 1 – The Dylan Thomas Centre in Swansea is opened by Jimmy Carter.
- April 23 – World Book Day is first celebrated.
- July 16 – Amazon.com, incorporated a year earlier by Jeff Bezos in Washington (state) as an online bookstore, sells its first book: Douglas Hofstadter's Fluid Concepts and Creative Analogies: Computer Models of the Fundamental Mechanisms of Thought.
- August – Blackwell UK becomes the first British bookseller to offer online purchasing.
- December 13 – The released film of Jane Austen's Sense and Sensibility has an Academy Award-winning screenplay by Emma Thompson.

Uncertain dates

- Simon & Schuster pays US$4.2 million for hardcover publishing rights to The Christmas Box, self-published by Richard Paul Evans, which has appeared on The New York Times Best Seller list.
- Fjærland in Norway becomes a book town.

== New books ==
=== Fiction ===
- Ben Aaronovitch – The Also People
- Louisa May Alcott (posthumous) – A Long Fatal Love Chase
- Roger MacBride Allen
  - Ambush at Corellia
  - Assault at Selonia
  - Showdown at Centerpoint
- Julia Alvarez – In the Time of the Butterflies
- Martin Amis – The Information
- Kevin J. Anderson – Darksaber
- Iain Banks – Whit
- Pat Barker – The Ghost Road
- Daniel Blythe – Infinite Requiem
- Thomas Brussig – Helden wie wir (Heroes Like Us)
- Christopher Bulis – The Sorcerer's Apprentice
- Edgar Rice Burroughs and Joe R. Lansdale – Tarzan: the Lost Adventure
- T. C. Boyle – The Tortilla Curtain
- Albert Camus (posthumous) – The First Man (Le Premier Homme, unfinished)
- Andrew Cartmel – Warlock
- Mary Higgins Clark – Silent Night
- Michael Connelly – The Last Coyote
- Paul Cornell – Human Nature
- Bernard Cornwell
  - Sharpe's Battle
  - Battle Flag
  - The Winter King
- Douglas Coupland – Microserfs
- Robert Crais – Voodoo River
- Michael Crichton – The Lost World
- Maurice G. Dantec – Les Racines du mal
- Martin Day – The Menagerie
- L. Sprague de Camp and Christopher Stasheff – The Exotic Enchanter
- Samuel Delany – Hogg
- Terrance Dicks – Shakedown: Return of the Sontarans
- Umberto Eco – The Island of the Day Before
- Stanley Elkin – Mrs. Ted Bliss
- Kirill Eskov – The Gospel of Afranius («Евангелие от Афрания»)
- Nicholas Evans – The Horse Whisperer
- Timothy Findley – The Piano Man's Daughter
- Richard Ford – Independence Day
- Jon Fosse – Melancholy (Melancholia I)
- Carlos Fuentes – The Crystal Frontier (La frontera de cristal)
- John Gardner – GoldenEye
- William H. Gass - The Tunnel
- John Grisham – The Rainmaker
- Barbara Hambly – Children of the Jedi
- Craig Hinton – Millennial Rites
- Nick Hornby – High Fidelity
- Kazuo Ishiguro – The Unconsoled
- Elfriede Jelinek – The Children of the Dead
- Jo Jung-rae – Arirang
- Welwyn Wilton Katz – Out of the Dark
- Stephen King – Rose Madder
- Joe R. Lansdale – The Two-Bear Mambo
- John le Carré – Our Game
- Andy Lane
  - The Empire of Glass
  - Original Sin
- Paul Leonard
  - Dancing the Code
  - Toy Soldiers
- Jonathan Lethem – Amnesia Moon
- Barry Letts – The Ghosts of N-Space
- Robert Ludlum – The Apocalypse Watch
- Steve Lyons
  - Head Games
  - Time of Your Life
- Frank McCourt – Angela's Ashes (semi-autobiographical)
- Val McDermid – The Mermaids Singing
- David A. McIntee
  - Lords of the Storm
  - Sanctuary
- Andreï Makine – Dreams of My Russian Summers (Le Testament français)
- Henning Mankell – Chronicler of the Winds (Comédia infantil)
- Stephen Marley – Managra
- Zakes Mda – Ways of Dying
- James A. Michener – Miracle in Seville
- Rohinton Mistry – A Fine Balance
- Mary McGarry Morris – Songs in Ordinary Time
- Kate Orman – Set Piece
- Terry Pratchett – Maskerade
- Douglas Preston and Lincoln Child
  - Relic
  - Mount Dragon
- Christoph Ransmayr – The Dog King (Morbus Kitahara)
- Jean Raspail – L'Anneau du pêcheur
- Justin Richards – System Shock
- Andrew Roberts – The Aachen Memorandum
- Gareth Roberts
  - The Romance of Crime
  - Zamper
- J. Jill Robinson – Eggplant Wife
- Philip Roth – Sabbath's Theater
- Salman Rushdie – The Moor's Last Sigh
- Gary Russell – Invasion of the Cat-People
- Josè Saramago – Blindness (Ensaio sobre a cegueira)
- Bernhard Schlink – The Reader
- W. G. Sebald – Die Ringe des Saturn: Eine englische Wallfahrt (The Rings of Saturn: An English Pilgrimage)
- Sidney Sheldon – Morning, Noon and Night
- Jane Smiley - Moo
- Danielle Steel – Five Days In Paris
- Neal Stephenson – The Diamond Age, or A Young Lady's Illustrated Primer
- James B. Stewart – Blood Sport
- Dave Stone – Sky Pirates!
- Olga Tokarczuk – E.E.
- Jim Turner, editor – Cthulhu 2000: A Lovecraftian Anthology
- Andrew Vachss – Footsteps of the Hawk
- Robert James Waller – Puerto Vallarta Squeeze
- Dave Wolverton – The Courtship of Princess Leia

=== Children and young people ===
- Chris Van Allsburg – Bad Day at Riverbend
- Elizabeth Arnold – The Parsley Parcel
- Marion Zimmer Bradley (with Rosemary Edghill) – Ghostlight
- Jimmy Carter (illustrated by Amy Carter) – The Little Baby Snoogle-Fleejer
- Donald Hall (with Barry Moser) – The Pageant
- Virginia Hamilton (with Leo and Diane Dillon) – Her Stories: African American Folktales, Fairy Tales, and True Tales
- Joe R. Lansdale – Tarzan: the Lost Adventure
- Fran Manushkin (with Ned Bittinger) – The Matzah That Papa Brought Home
- Jim Murphy – The Great Fire
- Alison Prince – The Sherwood Hero
- Philip Pullman – Northern Lights (in US as The Golden Compass)
- Diana Pullein-Thompson – I Wanted a Pony
- Josephine Pullein-Thompson – Six Ponies
- Mario Vargas Llosa (with Willi Glasauer) – Hitos y Mitos Literarios (The Milestones and the Stories of Greatest Literary Works)
- Judith Viorst – Alexander, Who Is Not (Do You Hear Me? I Mean It!) Going to Move
- Jacqueline Wilson – Double Act

=== Drama ===
- Parv Bancil – Papa Was A Bus Conductor
- Jez Butterworth – Mojo
- Margaret Edson – Wit
- Horton Foote – The Young Man From Atlanta
- Jon Fosse – The Name (Namnet)
- Ronald Harwood – Taking Sides
- Sarah Kane – Blasted
- Terrence McNally – Master Class
- Lynn Nottage
  - Crumbs from the Table of Joy
  - Por'Knockers
- Yasmina Reza – The Unexpected Man (L'homme du hasard)
- Tom Stoppard – Indian Ink

=== Poetry ===
- Mark Doty – Atlantis: Poems

=== Non-fiction ===
- André Aciman – Out of Egypt
- Jean Baudrillard – The Gulf War Did Not Take Place
- John G. Bennett (posthumously) – The Masters of Wisdom
- George G. Blackburn – The Guns of Normandy
- Wayne C. Booth, Gregory G. Colomb, and Joseph M. Williams – The Craft of Research
- Pascal Bruckner – The Temptation of Innocence
- L. Sprague de Camp – The Ape-Man Within
- Tim Cornell – The Beginnings of Rome: Italy and Rome from the Bronze Age to the Punic Wars
- Paul Davies – About Time
- Robin Dunbar – The Trouble with Science
- Mark Epstein – Thoughts Without a Thinker: Psychotherapy from a Buddhist Perspective
- Bill Gates – The Road Ahead
- Doris Kearns Goodwin – No Ordinary Time: Franklin and Eleanor Roosevelt: The Home Front in World War II
- Richard Hoffman – Half the House: A Memoir
- Nelson Mandela – Long Walk to Freedom
- Leonard Nimoy – I Am Spock
- Leslie and Les Parrott – Saving Your Marriage Before It Starts
- Man Ray and André Breton – Man Ray, 1890–1976
- Condoleezza Rice and Philip Zelikow – Germany Unified and Europe Transformed: A Study in Statecraft
- Oliver Sacks – An Anthropologist on Mars
- Simon Schama – Landscape and Memory
- Sterling Seagrave – Lords of the Rim
- Miranda Seymour – Robert Graves: Life on the Edge
- Howard Stern – Miss America
- Ibn Warraq – Why I Am Not a Muslim
- Jane Wesman – Dive Right In: The Sharks Won't Bite
- Jane Wilson-Howarth – Bugs, Bites & Bowels (later editions as The Essential Guide to Travel Health)

== Films ==
- Sense and Sensibility

== Births ==
- June 7 - Beth Reekles, Welsh author of young adult fiction
- June 13 - S. C. Megale, American novelist and screenwriter

== Deaths ==
- January 9 – Peter Cook, English writer, comedian and satirist (born 1937)
- January 30 – Gerald Durrell, English nature writer and naturalist (born 1925)
- January 31 – George Abbott, American writer, director and producer (born 1887)
- February 4 – Patricia Highsmith, American crime novelist (born 1921)
- February 6
  - James Merrill, American poet (born 1926)
  - Xia Yan (夏衍), Chinese playwright and screenwriter, (born 1900)
- February 14 – Mary Paik Lee, Korean-American writer (born 1900)
- February 20 – Robert Bolt, English dramatist (born 1924)
- February 21 – Calder Willingham, American writer (born 1922)
- February 23 – James Herriot, English veterinary novelist (born 1916)
- March 9 – Ian Ballantine, American publisher (born 1916)
- March 20 – Sidney Kingsley, American dramatist (born 1906)
- April 14 – Brian Coffey, Irish poet (born 1905)
- April 27 – Willem Frederik Hermans, Dutch writer (born 1921)
- May 30 or May 31 – Ștefana Velisar Teodoreanu, Romanian novelist, memoirist and poet (born 1897)
- June 14 – Roger Zelazny, American fantasy and science fiction writer (born 1937)
- June 15 – Charles Bennett, English screenwriter (born 1899)
- June 20 – Emil Cioran, Romanian philosopher and essayist (born 1911)
- June 21– Katarína Lazarová, Slovak novelist and translator (born 1914)
- June 25 – Qiu Miaojin (邱妙津), Taiwanese Chinese novelist (suicide, born 1969)
- July 6 – Aziz Nesin, Turkish writer (born 1915)
- July 13 – Ashapoorna Devi, Indian author and poet (born 1908)
- July 16
  - May Sarton, Belgian-born American poet, novelist and memoirist (born 1912)
  - Stephen Spender, English poet (born 1909)
- July 25 – Janice Elliott, English novelist and children's writer (born 1931)
- August 3 – Edward Whittemore, American novelist, (born 1933)
- August 17 – Howard Koch, American screenwriter (born 1901)
- August 19 – Pierre Schaeffer, French composer and writer (born 1910)
- August 29 – Michael Ende, German fantasy novelist (born 1929)
- September 8 – Eileen Chang, Chinese writer (born 1920)
- October 13 – Henry Roth, Austrian-born American novelist and short story writer (born 1906)
- October 22 – Kingsley Amis, English novelist (born 1922)
- October 29 – Terry Southern, American screenwriter (born 1924)
- November 4 – Gilles Deleuze, French philosopher (born 1925)
- November 10 – Ken Saro-Wiwa, Nigerian writer (executed, born 1941)
- November 13 – Mary Elizabeth Counselman, American author and poet (born 1911)
- November 16 – Robert H. Adleman, American novelist and historian (born 1919)
- November 17 – Marguerite Young, American novelist, poet and biographer (born 1908)
- November 20 – Robie Macauley, American writer and literary critic (born 1919)
- November 22 – Margaret St. Clair, American science fiction writer (born 1911)
- December 2 – Robertson Davies, Canadian novelist (born 1913)
- December 9 – Toni Cade Bambara, American writer (born 1939)
- December 30 – Heiner Müller, German dramatist (born 1929)

== Awards ==
- Nobel Prize for Literature: Seamus Heaney
- Camões Prize: José Saramago

=== Australia ===
- The Australian/Vogel Literary Award: Richard King, Kindling Does For Firewood
- C. J. Dennis Prize for Poetry: Bruce Beaver, Anima and Other Poems
- Kenneth Slessor Prize for Poetry: Peter Boyle, Coming Home From the World
- Mary Gilmore Prize: Aileen Kelly, Coming Up for Light
- Miles Franklin Award: Helen Demidenko, The Hand That Signed the Paper

=== Canada ===
- Bronwen Wallace Memorial Award
- Giller Prize for Canadian Fiction: Rohinton Mistry, A Fine Balance
- See 1995 Governor General's Awards for a complete list of winners and finalists for those awards.
- Edna Staebler Award for Creative Non-Fiction: Denise Chong, The Concubine's Children

=== France ===
- Prix Goncourt: Andreï Makine, Le Testament français
- Prix Décembre: Jean Échenoz, Les Grandes Blondes
- Prix Médicis French: Vassilis Alexakis, La Langue maternelle and Andreï Makine, Le testament français
- Prix Médicis International: Alessandro Baricco, Châteaux de la colère

=== United Kingdom ===
- Booker Prize: Pat Barker, The Ghost Road
- Carnegie Medal for children's literature: Philip Pullman, Northern Lights
- James Tait Black Memorial Prize for fiction: Christopher Priest, The Prestige
- James Tait Black Memorial Prize for biography: Gitta Sereny, Albert Speer: His Battle with the Truth
- Cholmondeley Award: U. A. Fanthorpe, Christopher Reid, C. H. Sisson, Kit Wright
- Eric Gregory Award: Colette Bryce, Sophie Hannah, Tobias Hill, Mark Wormald
- Newdigate prize: Antony Dunn
- Whitbread Book of the Year Award: Kate Atkinson, Behind the Scenes at the Museum

=== United States ===
- Agnes Lynch Starrett Poetry Prize: Sandy Solomon, Pears, Lake, Sun
- Aiken Taylor Award for Modern American Poetry: Maxine Kumin
- American Academy of Arts and Letters Gold Medal for Fiction, William Maxwell
- Carnegie Medal: Philip Pullman, Northern Lights
- Compton Crook Award: Doranna Durgin, Dun Lady's Jess
- Hugo Award: Lois McMaster Bujold, Mirror Dance
- Nebula Award: Robert Sawyer, The Terminal Experiment
- Newbery Medal for children's literature: Sharon Creech, Walk Two Moons
- Pulitzer Prize for Drama: Horton Foote, The Young Man From Atlanta
- Pulitzer Prize for Fiction: Carol Shields, The Stone Diaries
- Pulitzer Prize for Poetry: Philip Levine, The Simple Truth
- Pulitzer Prize for Biography or Autobiography: Joan D. Hedrick, Harriet Beecher Stowe: A Life
- Pulitzer Prize for General Nonfiction: Jonathan Weiner, The Beak of the Finch: A Story of Evolution in Our Time
- Pulitzer Prize for History: Doris Kearns Goodwin, No Ordinary Time: Franklin and Eleanor Roosevelt: The Home Front in World War II
- Wallace Stevens Award: James Tate
- Whiting Awards:

Fiction: Michael Cunningham, Reginald McKnight, Matthew Stadler, Melanie Sumner
Nonfiction: André Aciman, Lucy Grealy (nonfiction/poetry), Suzannah Lessard, Russ Rymer
Poetry: James L. McMichael, Mary Ruefle

=== Elsewhere ===
- Friedenspreis des Deutschen Buchhandels: Annemarie Schimmel
- New Zealand Book Award for Poetry: Michele Leggott, Dia
- Montana Book Award for Poetry: Michael Jackson, Pieces of Music
- Premio Nadal: Ignacio Carrión Hernández, Cruzar el Danubio
- Premio San Clemente: Xurxo Borrazás, Vicious

== Notes ==
- Hahn, Daniel (2015). The Oxford Companion to Children's Literature (2nd ed.). Oxford. University Press. ISBN 9780198715542.
