= Murdocca =

Murdocca is a surname. Notable people with the surname include:

- Massimo Murdocca (born 1984), Australian soccer player
- Salvatore Murdocca (born 1943), American children's book illustrator

== See also ==
- Murdocco
