= Salvatore Murdocca =

American children's book illustrator (born 1943)

Salvatore "Sal" Murdocca
- Born: April 26, 1943 (age 83)
- Education: High School of Art and Design; Art Students League of New York
- Occupations: Illustrator; writer
- Known for: Illustrations for the Magic Tree House series

Salvatore "Sal" Murdocca (born April 26, 1943) is an American children's book illustrator. He is best known for illustrating the Magic Tree House series written by Mary Pope Osborne (from 1992) and the nonfiction Magic Tree House Fact Checkers by Osborne and collaborators (from 2000)—about 50 and 30 volumes respectively to 2014. He also illustrated a series by George Edward Stanley.

== Early life and education ==
Murdocca grew up in Brooklyn, New York and attended the High School of Art and Design in New York City, majoring in illustration. After graduating in 1960, he spent another year studying at the Art Students League while apprenticing in a commercial art studio.

== Career ==
After a successful nine-year career as an advertising and magazine illustrator, Murdocca gradually turned to children's book illustration.

Since 1970, Murdocca has authored 10 books and illustrated hundreds of education, mass-market, and trade books. He has illustrated books by such noted authors as Elizabeth Winthrop (Dancing Granny, Marshall Cavendish, 2003), Eve Bunting, Bill Martin Jr., Olivia Newton-John, Charles Grodin, Alan Benjamin, Laura Numeroff, Edward Packard, Jeanne Bendick, and Mary Pope Osborne.

In the early 1980s, Murdocca taught writing and illustration for two years at the Parsons School of Design.

He wrote the libretto for an opera inspired by his own book, The Hero of Hamblett, published in 1980.

== Awards and recognition ==
His artwork has been recognized by The Society of Illustrators, the Art Director's Club in New York City, and the Children's Book Council. His writing has been recognized by the Literary Guild. He won an international short story competition in 1978.

Murdocca is also an award-winning fine artist who has participated in numerous solo and group exhibitions of his watercolor and acrylic paintings. His fine art has been shown at galleries in Nyack, New York, SoHo in New York City, Key West, Florida, and in France.
