= Ignaz von Olfers =

German naturalist, historian and diplomat

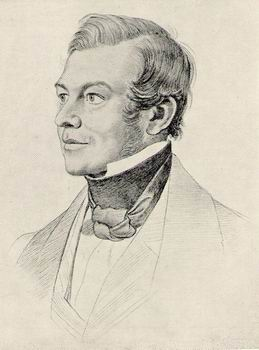
- Born: 30 August 1793; Münster
- Died: 23 April 1871; Berlin
- Occupations: Scientific collector, medical doctor, art historian, botanical collector

Ignaz Franz Werner Maria von Olfers (30 August 1793 – 23 April 1871) was a German naturalist, historian and diplomat.

== Biography ==
He was born in Münster, into a banking Olfers family, that in 1803 also became an aristocratic one. In 1816 he travelled to Brazil as a diplomat.

In 1839 he was made director of the royal art collections and had significant influence on Frederick William IV of Prussia for a re-development of the Museumsinsel, Berlin. Together with architect Friedrich August Stueler, he developed the concept of the Neues Museum, Berlin and had great influence on organisation and presentation of exhibits and interior. His daughter was the writer and illustrator Marie von Olfers.

Olfers described a number of new mammal species in Wilhelm Ludwig von Eschwege's Journal von Brasilien (1818).

In 1819, Olfersia which is a genus of ferns (in the family Dryopteridaceae) from South America, was published, then a species of South American snake, Philodryas olfersii (in 1823), and frog, Physalaemus olfersii (in 1856), were all named in his honour.

== See also ==
- Category:Taxa named by Ignaz von Olfers
