= Von Olfers =

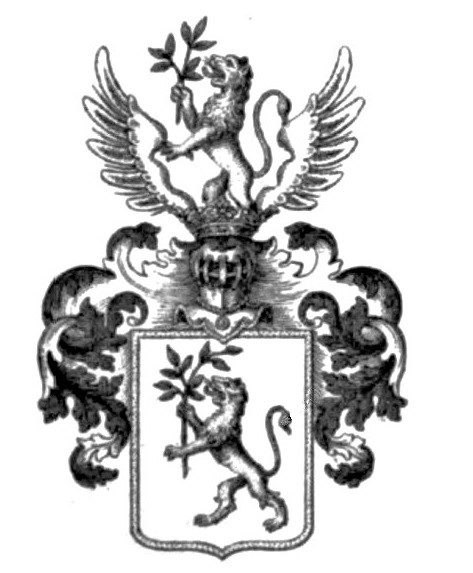
Coat of Arms of the Olfers family

The Olfers family or von Olfers is a German noble family, belonging to the briefadel, originated from Prince-Bishopric of Münster.

== History ==
The family was first ennobled on 27 August 1803 by Francis II in Vienna, when they became part of the nobility of the Holy Roman Empire. On 15 May 1804, they also became part of the nobility of Prussia. Members of the family distinguished themselves as bankers, politicians and diplomats.

== Notable members ==
- Hedwig von Olfers, child of Ignaz von Olfers and spouse of Heinrich Abeken
- Ignaz von Olfers (1793–1871), German naturalist, historian, and diplomat
- Marie von Olfers (1826–1924), German writer, illustrator, and salonnière
- Sibylle von Olfers (1881–1916), German art teacher, nun, author, and illustrator

== See also ==
- Steve Olfers (b. 1982), Dutch former footballer
