= The Presence: A Ghost Story =

2003 novel by Eve Bunting

- Author: Eve Bunting
- Language: English
- Publisher: Clarion Books
- Publication date: September 22, 2003
- Publication place: United States
- Pages: 208
- ISBN: 978-0-618-26919-8
- OCLC: 52121261
- LC Class: PZ7.B91527 Pr 2003

The Presence: A Ghost Story is a children's ghost novel by Eve Bunting.

== Plot introduction ==
The spirit of a 17-year-old boy that died 120 years ago stands on the stairs of a church in Pasadena, California, waiting for 17-year-old Catherine, who is spending Christmas with her grandmother while her parents are traveling in Europe. The ghost, Noah, who calls himself The Presence, is searching for a soul mate and thinks that Catherine is the one after he convinced himself that the many other girls before her, were "the one". Catherine has grief and guilt about her best friend Kirsty's death and Catherine is shocked when Noah tells her that he has talked to Kirsty and can arrange a time for her to talk to her friend. The ghost and Catherine tell the story and their narratives show details of the ghost's past as well as the accident that claimed Kirsty's life.

== Reception ==
A Publishers Weekly review says, "Though the heroine's survival is never in question, crisp writing and questions that remain unanswered till tale's end will likely keep fans of ghost stories engaged". Susan Riley, of School Library Journal, reviewed the book saying, "Bunting, long a favorite of teen thrill seekers, has produced another winner in this well-written story of acute loneliness, alienation, romance, the occult, hope, and tragedy. Fans of the genre will surely pass it from friend to friend, and it's a natural for reluctant readers". A Kirkus Reviews review says, "friend/romance Collin, the minister's son, provides Catherine with fleeting bits of joy and a feeling of solidity from his realness. She is not free of burden by the end, but there is hope. Memorable".
