= Miracle in Seville =

1995 novel by James Michener

Miracle In Seville
- First edition
- Author: James Michener
- Illustrator: John Fulton
- Language: English
- Genre: Historical novel
- Publisher: Random House
- Publication date: 1995
- Publication place: United States
- Media type: Print (hardback)
- Pages: 107pp.
- ISBN: 0-679-41822-9

Miracle in Seville (1995) is a novel by James A. Michener, the last to be released during his lifetime. (Recessional, however, was the last to be completed.)

In addition to his output of large, multigenerational novels, Michener was also a prolific journalist, traveling around the world and reporting on a variety of issues for peer-reviewed journals and sometimes for individual publication as novels, as was the case with The Bridge at Andau and Iberia. Miracle in Seville is just such a book.

The tale is narrated by Shenstone, an American sports writer who is in Spain to research an article about a disgraced breeder of fighting bulls. He witnesses a miraculous intervention, and a conflict between the Virgin Mary and the fortune teller sister of a matador who may have cursed the rancher's herd.

== Plot ==
The story draws on religious themes, interweaving gypsy traditions, belief in the intervening power of the Virgin Mary, and the hope of God's forgiveness and redemption, into the Spanish tradition of bullfighting. The action occurs during Holy Week in Spain, and Michener competently captures the religious processions. He provides meticulous detail of bull fights (although some reviewers have taken umbrage at supposedly erroneous details in his narrative). The tale involves a Gypsy matador (Lazaro López), his sister (Magdalena López) who reads fortunes, a cross-eyed Virgin Mary (La Bizca), the American writer (Shenstone), the Spanish bull breeder (Don Cayetano Mota) who is struggling to revive his once-famed herd, and of course the many bulls in Mota's herd.

Despite his initial skepticism, the American is drawn into Mota's efforts, which involve fervent prayers to The Virgin and Herculean acts undertaken during Holy Week to prove his devotion and piety. He knows that his prayers will eventually be rewarded, and this knowledge allows him to live with the often-humiliating performance of his bulls in the arena vis-a-vis the arrogant Gómez. We learn that Lazaro López is also being aided by a powerful female, his sister, who may have the ability to curse the bulls that her brother must face. She is determined that her brother must prevail.
