= Rocking Horse Christmas =

Picture Book

- Author: Mary Pope Osborne
- Illustrator: Ned Bittinger
- Published: 1997
- Publisher: Scholastic Incorporated

Rocking Horse Christmas is a 1997 children's fiction Christmas picture book by Mary Pope Osborne and illustrated by Ned Bittinger. It was originally published in 1997, by Scholastic.

== Synopsis ==
The story is about a boy who finds a rocking horse under his Christmas tree. He names the rocking horse Shadow, and together they go through many imaginary adventures. The boy grows up and Shadow is left in the attic where he awaits the return of the boy. Years go by and the boy's son rediscovers Shadow and soon this new boy and Shadow have their own imaginary adventures.

== Reception ==
Booklist described Osborne's text as a "heartfelt simplicity and a touch of melancholy" while also calling Bittinger's oil paintings "spectacular". School Library Journal called the story "rich in the spirit of Christmas" and called the illustrations "rich in palette and detail." The Horn Book Magazine also applauded Bittinger's oil illustrations saying that they "effectively portray both boys' imaginary travels." Rocking Horse Christmas was chosen by The American Booksellers as their "Pick of the Lists." An article in Albemarle Magazine stated that Bittinger spent six months working on preliminary drawings and the illustrations for the book.

One of Bittinger's illustrations from the book was featured on the cover of the Lands' End kids' holiday catalog in 1997.
