= Magic Tree House =

Series of children's novels by Mary Pope Osborne

- Author: Mary Pope Osborne
- Illustrator: Salvatore Murdocca (US); Ayana Amako (Japan)
- Language: English
- Genre: Children's historical fantasy
- Published: July 28, 1992; 34 years ago–present
- Publisher: Random House (US); Media Factory (Japan)
- Publication place: United States

Magic Tree House is an American children's series written by American author Mary Pope Osborne. The original American series was illustrated by Salvatore Murdocca until 2016, after which AG Ford took over. Other illustrators have been used for foreign-language editions.

The series is divided into two groups. The first group consists of Books 1–28, in which Morgan Le Fay sends Jack and Annie Smith, siblings from the fictional small town of Frog Creek, Pennsylvania, on adventures and missions through a magical tree house. The second group, called Magic Tree House: Merlin Missions, begins with Book 29, Christmas in Camelot, and has ancient wizard Merlin the Magician giving Jack and Annie quests. These books are longer, and some take place in fantasy realms such as Camelot. Kathleen and Teddy are apprentices who befriend Jack and Annie and provide support, occasionally joining them on adventures. In Super Edition #1, Teddy sends them on a mission instead of Morgan or Merlin. The companion Magic Tree House Fact Trackers are co-written by Mary Pope Osborne with her husband Will Osborne or sister Natalie Pope Boyce.

== Series background ==
After graduating from college, Osborne and her roommate went traveling. She spent time in Crete and traveled through Iraq, Iran, India, Afghanistan, Turkey, Lebanon, Syria, and Pakistan. The trip ended when Osborne experienced sepsis in Nepal and was hospitalized for several weeks, during which she read The Lord of the Rings. Remarking on her travels, Osborne said, "That journey irrevocably changed me. The experience gathered serves as a reference point every day of my life. I encountered worlds of light and worlds of darkness — and planted seeds of the imagination that led directly to my being an author of children's books."

Osborne's travels and experiences have largely factored into her writing, which has allowed her to experience the thrills of traveling. She has stated that, "Without even leaving my home, I’ve traveled around the globe, learning about the religions of the world."

Osborne's writing career began "one day, out of the blue" when she wrote Run, Run As Fast As You Can in 1982, which she has said is semi-autobiographical, as she stated: "The girl was a lot like me and many of the incidents in the story were similar to happenings in my childhood." The book served as the starting point for Osborne's writing career; her early work received mixed reviews. Her work includes young adult novels, picture books, retellings of mythology and fairy tales, biographies, mysteries, a six-part series of the Odyssey, a book of American Tall Tales, and a book for young readers about major world religions.

The idea for the series came when Penguin Random House asked Osborne to start writing a series of children's books. She knew from the beginning that she wanted to include time travel, and the idea for the treehouse as the means of time travel came to her when she and her husband saw one while on a walk in the forest in Pennsylvania.

Osborne says that she can work on Magic Tree House up to 12 hours a day and seven days a week and has used space at shared office space, The Writer's Room. She has modeled her writing after Hemingway by trying to be simple and direct and is "noted for writing clear, lively, well-paced prose in both her stories and her informational books."

== Main characters ==
When Osborne started writing the series, she wrote Jack as a main character and added Annie as a typical annoying younger sister. After writing her in, Osborne eventually decided to make her a main character. She highlights Annie’s bravery as a characteristic that is the main difference between Annie and herself, as Osborne has noted she often wished she was braver.

=== Jack ===
Jack is the older brother, who is known for his love of books and learning, an attribute Osborne says connects her to him. He tends to be cautious. According to the original illustrations by Sal Murdocca, Jack has brown hair, wears red glasses, and is taller than Annie.

=== Annie ===
Annie is the younger sister, who is known for her bravery, impulsive decisions, and caring for the people and animals around her. According to the original illustrations by Sal Murdocca, Annie has medium-length blonde hair, often worn in double braids, and bangs, and is shorter than Jack.

== Legacy ==
Mary Pope Osborne's books have been featured in several Best Books of the Year Lists, including School Library Journal, Parents’ Magazine, The Bulletin of the Center for Children's Books, and Bank Street College of Education. She has received honors from organizations as the National Council of Teachers of English, The Children's Book Council, and the International Reading Association. She received the 1992 Diamond State Reading Association Award, 2005 Ludington Memorial Award from the Educational Paperback Association and the 2010 Heidelberger Leander Award. She has also received awards from the Carolina Alumni Association, the Virginia Library Association and in spring 2013, she was awarded an Honorary Doctorate of Letters from the University of North Carolina at Chapel Hill.

Osborne served two separate terms as president of the Authors Guild and also chaired its Children's Book Committee. She has since traveled extensively in the states and throughout the world, visiting schools and speaking on issues related to reading and books. In 2011, she attended the Tokyo International Film Festival for the premiere of the Magic Tree House anime film and visited schools in the tsunami-hit area of Japan. The film grossed 5.7 million dollars; Osborne donated all proceeds into her educational works.

She was profiled on NBC's Rock Center with Brian Williams for her continued efforts to give children books while on a Magic Tree House-themed tour bus. She spoke of the pressure she feels as an author that children look up to, "for a child to value someone who writes books is so extraordinary."

To celebrate the 20th anniversary of the Magic Tree House series in 2012, Osborne created a Magic Tree House Classroom Adventures Program, through which she aims to inspire children to read and love reading while helping them to read at grade level by the end of 3rd grade. The program is free of charge and provides a set of online educational resources for teachers and allows for Title 1 schools to apply for free Magic Tree House books. Under Classroom Adventures, Osborne, in partnership with the First Book organization in Washington, D.C., has donated hundreds of thousands of Magic Tree House books to underserved schools.

== Adaptations ==
=== Magic Tree House Children's Theatre ===
The Magic Tree House brand has expanded into other forms. A musical adaptation, Magic Tree House: The Musical, was created by Will Osborne and Randy Court based on Christmas in Camelot and premiered in September 2007. Osborne hoped that it would have appeal to both kids and adults, like The Lion King or Mary Poppins. The musical has toured nationally and had a cast album.

A planetarium show, Magic Tree House: Space Mission, also created by Will Osborne, is produced and presented at the Morehead Planetarium in Chapel Hill, North Carolina.

In 2011, Will Osborne collaborated with New Orleans composer Allen Toussaint and Ain't Misbehavin' co-creator Murray Horwitz to write A Night in New Orleans, a musical adaptation of A Good Night for Ghosts about the life of Louis Armstrong which features an ensemble cast and live jazz band. It premiered in 2012 at the New Jersey Performing Arts Center and was shown free to Newark 4th grade students.

Magic Tree House Kids Shows are theatrical adaptations of select titles in the Magic Tree House series designed specifically for kids' performances. To date, children's shows have been created by husband and wife playwright and composer team Randy Courts and Jenny Laird in collaboration with Will Osborne based on Dinosaurs Before Dark, The Knight at Dawn, Pirates Past Noon, A Ghost Tale for Christmas Time, and A Night in New Orleans. Stage Fright on a Summer Night, based on the life of William Shakespeare, premiered at the Orlando Shakespeare Theatre in October 2017.

=== Film adaptation ===
An anime film Magic Tree House (マジック・ツリーハウス, Majikku Tsurī Hausu), produced by Media Factory, premiered in Japan in October 2011 and was released there on January 7, 2012.

== List of Magic Tree House books ==
According to its official website, Magic Tree House books are for beginning chapter book readers.

=== Main series ===
Arc	Number	Title	First printed	Companion book
The Mystery of the Magic Tree House (#1)	#1	Dinosaurs Before Dark (UK Title: Valley of the Dinosaurs)	July 28, 1992	#1, Dinosaurs
Plot: Jack and Annie discover the tree house and, using the magical books there, unwittingly travel back to the late Cretaceous period, where they meet a Pteranodon that saves them from a Tyrannosaurus rex. Jack finds a gold medallion with the letter "M" on it.
The Mystery of the Magic Tree House (#2)	#2	The Knight at Dawn (UK title: Castle of Mystery)	February 16, 1993	#2, Knights and Castles
Plot: In medieval England during the Middle Ages, Jack and Annie explore a castle and meet a knight.
The Mystery of the Magic Tree House (#3)	#3	Mummies in the Morning (UK title: Secret of the Pyramid)	August 24, 1993	#3, Mummies and Pyramids
Plot: In Ancient Egypt, Jack and Annie help the ghost of Queen Hutepi find her missing Book of the Dead.
The Mystery of the Magic Tree House (#4)	#4	Pirates Past Noon (UK title: Pirates' Treasure!)	March 8, 1994	#4, Pirates
Plot: Jack and Annie encounter pirates in the Caribbean Sea and meet Morgan le Fay, who turns out to be the mysterious "M".
The Mystery of the Magic Spell (#1)	#5	Night of the Ninjas	March 21, 1995	#30, Ninjas and Samurai
Plot: Morgan le Fay is under a spell, and Jack and Annie must find four magical objects to reverse it with help from a mouse named Peanut. In ancient Japan, they encounter ninjas and samurai and get a moonstone.
The Mystery of the Magic Spell (#2)	#6	Afternoon on the Amazon (UK title: Adventure on the Amazon)	August 29, 1995	#5, Rain Forests
Plot: Jack and Annie search the Amazon rainforest for the second magical object, a mango.
The Mystery of the Magic Spell (#3)	#7	Sunset of the Sabertooth (UK title: Mammoth to the Rescue)	April 14, 1996	#12, Sabertooths and the Ice Age
Plot: In the last ice age, Jack and Annie encounter Cro-Magnons, woolly mammoths, and a saber-toothed cat while searching for the third object, a mammoth bone flute.
The Mystery of the Magic Spell (#4)	#8	Midnight on the Moon (UK title: Moon Mission)	October 29, 1996	#6, Space
Plot: Thirty-five years into the future (2031), Jack and Annie travel to a moon base on the moon to look for the fourth object, a moon rock, or so they think.
The Mystery of the Ancient Riddles (#1)	#9	Dolphins at Daybreak (UK title: Diving with Dolphins)	April 29, 1997	#9, Dolphins and Sharks
Plot: Jack and Annie have to solve four ancient riddles, the first of which is at the Pacific Ocean with bottlenose dolphins.
The Mystery of the Ancient Riddles (#2)	#10	Ghost Town at Sundown (UK title: A Wild West Ride)	September 16, 1997	#38, Wild West
Plot: In the American Wild West, Jack and Annie meet the cowboy Slim to solve the second riddle.
The Mystery of the Ancient Riddles (#3)	#11	Lions at Lunchtime (UK title: Lions on the Loose)	February 12, 1998	N/A
Plot: At the African Savannah, Jack and Annie set out to solve the third riddle.
The Mystery of the Ancient Riddles (#4)	#12	Polar Bears Past Bedtime (UK title: Icy Escape)	April 24, 1998	#16, Polar Bears and the Arctic
Plot: At the North Pole, Jack and Annie meet an Inuk and solve the fourth and final riddle, as well as an extra riddle.
The Mystery of the Lost Stories (#1)	#13	Vacation Under the Volcano (UK title: Racing with Gladiators)	June 20, 1998	#14, Ancient Rome and Pompeii
Plot: Now Master Librarians, Jack and Annie travel to Pompeii on the eve of the eruption of Mount Vesuvius to save a lost story for Morgan.
The Mystery of the Lost Stories (#2)	#14	Day of the Dragon King (UK title: Palace of the Dragon King)	August 11, 1998	#31, China: Land of the Emperor's Great Wall
Plot: Jack and Annie travel to China 2,000 years in the past, when it was ruled by the Dragon King, Emperor Qin. Their mission is to save a story from the book burning Qin ordered.
The Mystery of the Lost Stories (#3)	#15	Viking Ships at Sunrise (UK title: Voyage of the Vikings)	October 20, 1998	#33, Vikings
Plot: In medieval Ireland, Jack and Annie encounter Vikings raiding a village of monks where one was writing a lost story of a sea serpent named Sarph.
The Mystery of the Lost Stories (#4)	#16	Hour of the Olympics (UK title: Olympic Challenge!)	December 17, 1998	#10, Ancient Greece and the Olympics
Plot: In Ancient Greece, Jack and Annie witness the first Olympic games. At the end, Morgan revealed that every lost story they saved, including Pegasus, are in the stars.
The Mystery of the Enchanted Dog (#1)	#17	Tonight on the Titanic	March 23, 1999	#7, Titanic
Plot: Jack and Annie are assisted by the dog Teddy, whom they must find gifts for so that he can become human again. They travel back to 1912 on the RMS Titanic during its fateful voyage.
The Mystery of the Enchanted Dog (#2)	#18	Buffalo Before Breakfast	May 18, 1999	N/A
Plot: In the American Old West, Jack and Annie encounter a Lakota boy on the Great Plains.
The Mystery of the Enchanted Dog (#3)	#19	Tigers at Twilight	August 17, 1999	N/A
Plot: Jack and Annie explore the Indian jungle and save a tiger from a steel trap.
The Mystery of the Enchanted Dog (#4)	#20	Dingoes at Dinnertime	March 14, 2000	N/A
Plot: Jack and Annie explore the Australian Outback to find the gift from a kangaroo, and along the way help a joey and a koala escape a wildfire. After they receive the final gift and return home, Morgan removes the spell on Teddy, who is revealed to be a young magician who accidentally turned himself into a dog after casting a spell.
The Mystery of Morgan's Library (#1)	#21	Civil War on Sunday	May 23, 2000	N/A
Plot: Camelot is in trouble, so Morgan had Jack and Annie to bring four pieces of writing for her library. During the American Civil War, they encounter Clara Barton.
The Mystery of Morgan's Library (#2)	#22	Revolutionary War on Wednesday	September 26, 2000	#11, American Revolution
Plot: During the American Revolution, Jack and Annie cross the Delaware River with George Washington.
The Mystery of Morgan's Library (#3)	#23	Twister on Tuesday	March 27, 2001	#8, Twisters and Other Terrible Storms
Plot: In the 1870s, Jack and Annie encounter a pioneer settlement on the Midwestern prairie and must save a teacher and kids before a tornado hits.
The Mystery of Morgan's Library (#4)	#24	Earthquake in the Early Morning	August 24, 2001	N/A
Plot: In 1906, Jack and Annie experience the San Francisco earthquake. They use what they have learned to inspire King Arthur to battle Mordred; later books show he survived and won the battle.
The Mystery of Morgan's Rhymes (#1)	#25	Stage Fright on a Summer Night	March 12, 2002	N/A
Plot: Morgan tells Jack and Annie that they are ready to learn magic themselves. In Elizabethan England, the two meet William Shakespeare.
The Mystery of Morgan's Rhymes (#2)	#26	Good Morning, Gorillas!	August 23, 2002	N/A
Plot: In the Congo rainforest, Jack and Annie encounter gorillas.
The Mystery of Morgan's Rhymes (#3)	#27	Thanksgiving on Thursday	October 24, 2002	#13, Pilgrims
Plot: In Plymouth in 1621, Jack and Annie share the first Thanksgiving with the Pilgrims and Wampanoag Indians.
The Mystery of Morgan's Rhymes (#4)	#28	High Tide in Hawaii	March 25, 2003	#15, Tsunamis and Other Natural Disasters
Plot: In Hawaii, Jack and Annie make two friends and almost get caught in a tsunami.
Learning from Heroes (#1)	#29	A Big Day for Baseball	August 1, 2017	#37, Baseball
Plot: On Brooklyn's Ebbets Field on April 15, 1947, Jack and Annie witness Jackie Robinson's Major League debut.
Learning from Heroes (#2)	#30	Hurricane Heroes in Texas	August 7, 2018	#39, Texas
Plot: In Galveston, Texas circa 1900, Jack and Annie learn a big storm is coming.
Learning from Heroes (#3)	#31	Warriors in Winter	January 8, 2019	#40, Warriors
Plot: In the early 100s AD, Jack and Annie find themselves in a Roman camp.
Learning from Heroes (#4)	#32	To the Future, Ben Franklin	July 9, 2019	#41, Benjamin Franklin.
Plot: Jack and Annie meet Benjamin Franklin, only to cause a time paradox when he returns to their time with them.
Animal Rescues (#1)	#33	Narwhal on a Sunny Night	January 7, 2020	#42, Narwhals and Other Whales
Plot: In Greenland, Jack and Annie learn their mission is to save a narwhal.
Animal Rescues (#2)	#34	Late Lunch with Llamas	July 7, 2020	#43, Llamas and the Andes
Plot: In South America, Jack and Annie must rescue llamas.
Animal Rescues (#3)	#35	Camp Time in California	March 2, 2021	#28, Heroes for All Times
Plot: In California, Jack and Annie must save the wilderness.
Animal Rescues (#4)	#36	Sunlight on the Snow Leopard	January 4, 2022	#44, Snow Leopards and Other Wild Cats
Plot: In the Himalayas in Nepal, Jack and Annie must find the Gray Ghost.
Animal Rescues (#5)	#37	Rhinos at Recess	January 3, 2023	N/A
Plot: In South Africa, Jack and Annie must rescue a rhino.
Animal Rescues (#6)	#38	Time of the Turtle King	September 5, 2023	#23, Snakes and Other Reptiles
Plot: In the Galapagos Islands, Jack and Annie must rescue a sea turtle from a volcanic eruption.
Animal Rescues (#7)	#39	Windy Night with Wild Horses	May 7, 2024	#27, Horse Heroes
Plot: In Mongolia, Jack and Annie meet its little horses, who are recovering from near extinction, and the people who take care of them, and must protect them from wolves.
Animal Rescues (#8)	#40	Sea Otter Sunrise	July 1, 2025	N/A

=== Merlin Missions subseries ===
Magic Tree House: Merlin Missions Books 1-27 were written for more advanced readers ages 7–10. The Magic Tree House: Merlin Missions were originally ordered sequentially, starting at Book #29 (Christmas in Camelot). With the 25th anniversary re-prints, the books have been separated into their own distinct series and re-numbered starting at Merlin Mission #1.

Original #	Merlin Mission #	Title	Published	Story Arc	Plot Summary/Notes	Companion book
29	1	Christmas in Camelot	October 10, 2001	Quest to save Camelot arc #1	On Christmas. Jack and Annie go on a quest to save Camelot and prove to a beleaguered King Arthur that children and imagination can make a difference; along the way, they meet the Knights of the Round Table, most notably Sir Lancelot. This is the first story where Merlin the Magician sends Jack and Annie on an adventure instead of Morgan, having learned of their abilities from her.	N/A
30	2	Haunted Castle on Hallows Eve	June 18, 2003	Quest to save Camelot arc #2	On Halloween, Merlin tasks Jack, Annie, and Teddy with restoring order to a duke's castle on the outskirts of Camelot. This is the first book in which Jack and Annie use their own magic, as they harness the power of a magical hazel branch to turn back into humans after Teddy accidentally turns them into ravens. Jack is also able to use its power to defeat the evil Raven King by turning him into a baby raven.	N/A
31	3	Summer of the Sea Serpent	March 9, 2004	Quest to save Camelot arc #3	On the Summer solstice, Merlin tasks Jack and Annie with retrieving the Sword of Light for Camelot; along the way, they meet the selkie Kathleen, who, along with Teddy, becomes a recurring character. They turn into seals to retrieve the Sword of Light and earn the right to wield it, later learning that it is Excalibur, which they retrieved from Camelot's past for King Arthur to one day have.	N/A
32	4	Winter of the Ice Wizard	September 28, 2004	Quest to save Camelot arc #4	On the Winter solstice, Jack and Annie go on a mission for the evil Ice Wizard to retrieve his eye and free Merlin and Morgan. They also had to get back Merlin's Staff of Strength, but luckily, Teddy and Kathleen are there to help.	N/A
33	5	Carnival at Candlelight	March 8, 2005	Using magic wisely arc #1	Merlin tasks Jack and Annie with completing missions to prove to him they can use magic wisely. The first mission is to save Venice, Italy from a flood, but Merlin's instructions are confusing.	N/A
34	6	Season of the Sandstorms	June 26, 2005	Using magic wisely arc #2	Jack and Annie must help the caliph of ancient Baghdad spread wisdom to the world.	N/A
35	7	Night of the New Magicians	March 14, 2006	Using magic wisely arc #3	During the Paris Exposition Universelle of 1889, Jack and Annie must save four magicians, Alexander Graham Bell, Louis Pasteur, Thomas Edison, and Gustave Eiffel, before an evil sorcerer kidnaps them and steals the secrets of their magic. It is revealed that there is no evil sorcerer, with Merlin wanting the two to meet them.	N/A
36	8	Blizzard of the Blue Moon	September 26, 2006	Using magic wisely arc #4	During the Great Depression in New York City, Jack and Annie must help a unicorn under a spell. However, two evil sorcerers in training, Balor and Grinda, are up to the same challenge. Jack and Annie also gain the power to make their own magic using a magic wand.	N/A
37	9	Dragon of the Red Dawn	February 27, 2007	Happiness arc #1	Merlin tasks Jack and Annie with finding the four secrets of happiness, as Morgan has noticed that he does not feel well, does not eat or sleep, and is tired. They travel to feudal Japan to spend the day with Japanese haiku poet Matsuo Bashō.	N/A
38	10	Monday with a Mad Genius	August 28, 2007	Happiness arc #2	In Florence, Italy, to find the second secret of happiness, Jack and Annie must help Leonardo da Vinci all day, "morning, noon, and afternoon, till the night bird sings its song." They unwittingly inspire him to try to fly his Ornithopter machine with their knowledge of the present day, but he is dejected when his efforts fail and he crashes. Annie uses magic to make them grow bird wings, allowing them to fly.	#19, Leonardo da Vinci
39	11	Dark Day in the Deep Sea	March 25, 2008	Happiness arc #3	In the 1870s, Jack and Annie look for the third secret of happiness. They are rescued by scientists on the HMS Challenger (1858) in the Atlantic Ocean, and end up helping them look for a sea monster. At 144 pages long, this book is the longest book in the series.	#17, Sea Monsters
40	12	Eve of the Emperor Penguin	September 23, 2008	Happiness arc #4	In Antarctica, Jack and Annie look for the fourth and final secret of happiness, but only find penguins, who know the answer. This is the only book where it is stated Jack and Annie did not travel through time, and is the only time they use the wand's power twice; once to find the penguins and once to teleport to Mount Erebus.	#18, Penguins and Antarctica
41	13	Moonlight on the Magic Flute	March 10, 2009	Inspiring arc #1	In 18th-century Austria, Jack and Annie must help the musician Mozart and encounter a mischievous boy who follows them around. When the boy lets the animals out of the palace zoo, Jack and Annie must use magic to resolve the situation in time for the party at the Summer Palace. When they use their magic flute, Mozart is inspired to make a song called The Magic Flute.	N/A
42	14	A Good Night for Ghosts	July 28, 2009	Inspiring arc #2	In New Orleans, Jack and Annie encounter real ghosts and discover the world of jazz when they meet a young Louis Armstrong.	#20, Ghosts
43	15	Leprechaun in Late Winter	January 12, 2010	Inspiring arc #3	In Ireland in 1862, Jack and Annie meet a young Lady Gregory, who is sad because she believes in leprechauns and faeries, but cannot find any. This is the first time that something that one of the kids has written has been used to travel through time, as they time travel using Jack's notes.	#21, Leprechauns and Irish Folklore
44	16	A Ghost Tale for Christmas Time	September 14, 2010	Inspiring arc #4	In Victorian England, Jack and Annie meet Charles Dickens after they are thrown in jail and he saves them. To find Charles' secret, they need help from three ghosts.	#22, Rags and Riches: Kids in the Time of Charles Dickens
45	17	A Crazy Day with Cobras	January 11, 2011	Penny's spell arc #1	When Teddy accidentally turns Merlin's penguin Penny to stone, Jack and Annie must find four ingredients for a spell to turn her back to normal before Merlin returns. To find the first ingredient, an emerald rose, they travel to an Indian desert, where they encounter a swarm of king cobras and meet the Great Mogul.	#23, Snakes and Other Reptiles
46	18	Dogs in the Dead of Night	August 9, 2011	Penny's spell arc #2	In the Swiss Alps, Jack and Annie search for the second object to break Penny's spell and become involved in a dog rescue.	#24, Dog Heroes
47	19	Abe Lincoln At Last!	December 27, 2011	Penny's spell arc #3	During the Civil War, Jack and Annie must help the orphan Sam, who is a friend of Lincoln, in order to find the third object to break Penny's spell.	#25, Abraham Lincoln
48	20	A Perfect Time for Pandas	July 24, 2012	Penny's spell arc #4	In China during the Great Sichuan Earthquake of 2008, Jack and Annie search for the fourth and final object to break Penny's spell and help to rescue pandas.	#26, Pandas and Other Endangered Species
49	21	Stallion by Starlight	March 26, 2013	Greatness arc #1	In Ancient Macedonia, Jack and Annie meet a young Alexander the Great and his stallion Bucephalus.	#27, Horse Heroes
50	22	Hurry Up Houdini!	August 23, 2013	Greatness arc #2	Jack and Annie meet magician Harry Houdini.	Magic Tricks from the Tree House
51	23	High Time for Heroes	January 7, 2014	Greatness arc #3	In Egypt, Jack and Annie meet Florence Nightingale.	#28, Heroes for All Times
52	24	Soccer on Sunday	May 27, 2014	Greatness arc #4	In Mexico during the 1970 FIFA World Cup, Jack and Annie seek out Pelé for him to tell them the "secret of greatness".	#29, Soccer
53	25	Shadow of the Shark	June 23, 2015	none	Morgan and Merlin allow Jack and Annie to go on vacation, but they accidentally travel to ancient Mayan times after pointing at the wrong illustration; there, they encounter sharks, Mayan warriors, and Yohl Ikʼnal.	#32, Sharks and Other Predators
54	26	Balto of the Blue Dawn	January 5, 2016	none	In Alaska in 1925, Jack and Annie meet Balto.	#34, Dogsledding and Extreme Sports
55	27	Night of the Ninth Dragon	July 26, 2016	none	Jack and Annie must help save Merlin, Morgan, Teddy, and Kathleen, who are trapped in Avalon, and King Arthur, who has been injured, when invaders threaten Camelot.	#35, Dragons and Mythical Creatures

=== Magic Tree House Super Edition book ===
On January 6, 2015, the first and currently only Magic Tree House Super Edition book was released. At 183 pages long, it is longer than both the original Magic Tree House books and the Magic Tree House: Merlin Missions.

#	Title	Published	Story Arc	Plot Summary/Notes	Companion book
1	Danger in the Darkest Hour	January 6, 2015	none	The first Magic Tree House Super Edition is called Danger in the Darkest Hour. It was reprinted as World at War, 1944 in 2017. During World War II, shortly before D-Day, Jack and Annie must rescue Kathleen from behind enemy lines. It features the first time they have had to deal with a situation using their own talents, without help from magic.	#36, World War II

=== Nonfiction books ===
The Magic Tree House Fact Trackers (formerly called Magic Tree House Research Guides) are non-fiction companions to the fiction books written by Mary Pope Osborne, Will Osborne, and Natalie Pope Boyce, which provide more in-depth information on topics featured in the series. They were first released in 2000 by Scholastic and Random House. As of January 2022, 44 have been published. The first two Fact Trackers were published in August 2000 as companions for the first two stories. In 2008, book #39, Dark Day in the Deep Sea, and its fact tracker, #17, Sea Monsters, were the first story and fact tracker to be published simultaneously.

No.	Title	Companion To:	Date Published:
1	Dinosaurs	Magic Tree House #1: Dinosaurs Before Dark	August 1, 2000
2	Knights and Castles	Magic Tree House #2: The Knight at Dawn	August 1, 2000
3	Mummies and Pyramids	Magic Tree House #3: Mummies in the Morning	February 27, 2001
4	Pirates	Magic Tree House #4: Pirates Past Noon	May 22, 2001
5	Rain Forests	Magic Tree House #6: Afternoon on the Amazon	September 25, 2001
6	Space	Magic Tree House #8: Midnight on the Moon	February 26, 2002
7	Titanic	Magic Tree House #17: Tonight on the Titanic	August 27, 2002
8	Twisters and Other Terrible Storms	Magic Tree House #23: Twister on Tuesday	February 5, 2003
9	Dolphins and Sharks	Magic Tree House #9: Dolphins at Daybreak	June 4, 2003
10	Ancient Greece and the Olympics	Magic Tree House #16: Hour of the Olympics	June 1, 2004
11	American Revolution	Magic Tree House #22: Revolutionary War on Wednesday	September 14, 2004
12	Sabertooths and the Ice Age	Magic Tree House #7: Sunset of the Sabertooth	February 1, 2005
13	Pilgrims	Magic Tree House #27: Thanksgiving on Thursday	September 1, 2005
14	Ancient Rome and Pompeii	Magic Tree House #13: Vacation Under a Volcano	April 25, 2006
15	Tsunamis and Other Natural Disasters	Magic Tree House #28: High Tide in Hawaii	February 27, 2007
16	Polar Bears and the Arctic	Magic Tree House #12: Polar Bears Past Bedtime	September 25, 2007
17	Sea Monsters	Magic Tree House: Merlin Missions #11: Dark Day in the Deep Sea	March 25, 2008
18	Penguins and Antarctica	Magic Tree House: Merlin Missions #12: Eve of the Emperor Penguin	September 23, 2008
19	Leonardo da Vinci	Magic Tree House: Merlin Missions #10: Monday with a Mad Genius	January 13, 2009
20	Ghosts	Magic Tree House: Merlin Missions #14: A Good Night for Ghosts	July 28, 2009
21	Leprechauns and Irish Folklore	Magic Tree House: Merlin Missions #15: Leprechaun in Late Winter	January 12, 2010
22	Rags and Riches: Kids in the Time of Charles Dickens	Magic Tree House: Merlin Missions #16: A Ghost Tale for Christmas Time	September 14, 2010
23	Snakes and Other Reptiles	Magic Tree House: Merlin Missions #17: A Crazy Day with Cobras; Magic Tree House #38: Time of the Turtle King	January 11, 2011
24	Dog Heroes	Magic Tree House: Merlin Missions #18: Dogs in the Dead of Night	August 9, 2011
25	Abraham Lincoln	Magic Tree House: Merlin Missions #19: Abe Lincoln At Last!	December 27, 2011
26	Pandas and Other Endangered Species	Magic Tree House: Merlin Missions #20: A Perfect Time for Pandas	July 24, 2012
27	Horse Heroes	Magic Tree House: Merlin Missions #21: Stallion by Starlight; Magic Tree House #39: Windy Night with Wild Horses	March 26, 2013
28	Heroes for All Times	Magic Tree House: Merlin Missions #23: High Time for Heroes; Magic Tree House #35: Camp Time in California	January 7, 2014
29	Soccer	Magic Tree House: Merlin Missions #24: Soccer on Sunday	May 27, 2014
30	Ninjas and Samurai	Magic Tree House #5: Night of the Ninjas	September 23, 2014
31	China: Land of the Emperor's Great Wall	Magic Tree House #14: Day of the Dragon King	December 23, 2014
32	Sharks and Other Predators	Magic Tree House: Merlin Missions #25: Shadow of the Shark	June 23, 2015
33	Vikings	Magic Tree House #15: Viking Ships at Sunrise	September 22, 2015
34	Dogsledding and Extreme Sports	Magic Tree House: Merlin Missions #26: Balto of the Blue Dawn	January 5, 2016
35	Dragons and Mythical Creatures	Magic Tree House: Merlin Missions #27: Night of the Ninth Dragon	July 26, 2016
36	World War II	Magic Tree House Super Edition: World at War, 1944	March 14, 2017
37	Baseball	Magic Tree House #29: A Big Day for Baseball	August 1, 2017
38	Wild West	Magic Tree House #10: Ghost Town at Sundown	January 2, 2018
39	Texas	Magic Tree House #30: Hurricane Heroes in Texas	August 7, 2018
40	Warriors	Magic Tree House #31: Warriors in Winter	January 8, 2019
41	Benjamin Franklin	Magic Tree House #32: To the Future, Ben Franklin	July 9, 2019
42	Narwhals and Other Whales	Magic Tree House #33: Narwhal on a Sunny Night	January 7, 2020
43	Llamas and the Andes	Magic Tree House #34: Late Lunch with Llamas	July 7, 2020
44	Snow Leopards and Other Wild Cats	Magic Tree House #36: Sunlight on the Snow Leopard	January 4, 2022

=== Other Magic Tree House books ===
#	Title	Published	Story Arc	Summary/Notes
1	Memories and Life Lessons from the Magic Tree House	September 6, 2022	none	This book serves as a celebration of the 30th anniversary of the Magic Tree House series, including quotes from the series and illustrations by the original artist, Sal Murdocca. Mary Pope Osborne fills this book with advice and with life lessons to share with readers of the series.
1	Magic Tree House Survival Guide	Sep 07, 2021	none	Jack and Annie have survived all kinds of dangers on their adventures in the magic tree house. Now they’re sharing their secrets with you! Find out how you can tackle lots of scary situations, including shark encounters, earthquakes, fires, shipwrecks, pandemics, and many more! With full-color photographs and illustrations, facts about real-life survival stories, and tips from Jack and Annie, this is a must-have for all survivors of the bestselling Magic Tree House series.
1	Magic Tree House Incredible Fact Book	Sep 27, 2016	none	"Our Favorite Facts about Animals, Nature, History, and More Cool Stuff!"
1	Magic Tricks from the Tree House	Jul 23, 2013	none	"A Fun Companion to Magic Tree House Merlin Mission...:Hurry Up, Houdini!"
1	Animal Games and Puzzles	Sep 01, 2020	none	"Take a walk on the wild side with Magic Tree House® animal activities! From cobras to koalas to emperor penguins, Jack and Annie have met all kinds of animals on their adventures. Now you can test your animal awareness and Magic Tree House® mastery with this flock of fantastic activities. Includes Tic-Cat-Toe, A Perfect Time for Riddles, Marsupial Maze, Crazy Critter Charades, Which Animal Are You?, and much more."
1	Magic Tree House Games & Puzzles from the Tree House	April 27th, 2010	none	"Travel through time and around the world with Jack and Annie to help them solve mazes and crossword puzzles, break secret codes, play games, draw pictures, and more They've seen the age of the dinosaurs and the high-tech future; they've visited freezing Antarctica and scorching deserts - and now Jack and Annie need your help with five activities from every Magic Tree House adventure..."
