= Magic Tree House (film) =

- Japanese promotional release poster
- Directed by: Hiroshi Nishikiori
- Screenplay by: Ichiro Okouchi
- Based on: The Magic Tree House series by Mary Pope Osborne
- Produced by: Hiroyuki Harada; Alexander Robinson
- Starring: Keiko Kitagawa; Mana Ashida
- Cinematography: Keisuke Nakamura
- Edited by: Shigeru Nishiyama
- Music by: Akira Senju
- Production companies: Gaga Communications; Ajiado
- Distributed by: Gaga Communications
- Release dates: October 23, 2011 (Tokyo Film Festival); January 7, 2012 (Japan)
- Running time: 105 minutes
- Country: Japan
- Language: Japanese
- Box office: US$5,747,918

Magic Tree House (マジック・ツリーハウス, Majikku Tsurī Hausu) is a 2011 Japanese animated fantasy film based on the American children's book series of the same name by Mary Pope Osborne. The film is directed by Hiroshi Nishikiori, and the film's screenplay was adapted from the Japanese version of the novel series Magic Tree House by Ichiro Okouchi. The film stars actress Keiko Kitagawa as Jack, and also stars child actress Mana Ashida as Annie.

Magic Tree House debuted at the 24th Tokyo International Film Festival on 23 October 2011. It was subsequently released in Japanese cinemas on 7 January 2012 and grossed the equivalent of US$5.7 million.

== Plot ==
Jack is a shy but confident bookworm, and his sister Annie can quickly make friends with whoever she wants, both humans and animals. One day, while they were playing together in their hometown of Frog Creek, Pennsylvania, they unexpectedly stumble upon a wooden treehouse located in the forest. This magical treehouse allows people to travel across time and space whenever they liked. Morgan le Fay is accidentally transformed into a mouse named Peanut by Merlin (echoing the plot from books 5–8), and Jack and Annie have to find four magic medallions to rescue her. They visit the late Cretaceous period with dinosaurs (from book 1), a medieval castle (from book 2), the town of Pompeii (from book 13) and a pirate ship (from book 4). At the end, Peanut is once again turned into Morgan.

== Production ==
=== Development ===
On 17 November 2010, Publisher Media Factory revealed that the English-language children's fantasy series, Magic Tree House would be adapted into an anime film. Subsequently, in the 6 March 2011 issue of the Asahi Shimbun newspaper, an advertisement announced that the film would be released in Japanese cinemas in 2011. This children fantasy series sold more than 3.3 million copies in Japan, and 92 million copies in 33 countries. It is the only film adaptation of the fantasy series, animated or otherwise, although a live-action Hollywood production has also been announced.

At a press conference that was held on 9 July 2011, Japanese film distributor Gaga Communication announced that the film would be released in Japan on 7 January 2012. The film is based on the Japanese version of the series illustrated by Ayana Amako, and the screenplay was adapted by screenwriter Ichiro Ookochi.

=== Cast and crew ===
The voice cast for the film Magic Tree House was announced on 8 August 2011. In her voice-acting debut, actress Keiko Kitagawa described this role as "challenging", and she added that she "wanted to express the freshness of the voice of [Jack] as much as possible." Mana Ashida, an avid reader who is a big fan of the original book series, said that she was "highly motivated" to play the role of Annie in this film. She said that she "enjoyed the adventure as much as Annie", to the extent that she felt that "she was flying into the book to be with Annie." Mana Ashida had previously voiced Agnes in the Japanese version of the 2010 film Despicable Me.

Ashida and Kitagawa had previously worked together in the 2011 television drama special Kono Sekai no Katasumi ni that was aired on 5 August 2011 on the Nippon Television network. Kitagawa described Ashida as "a professional child actress", while Ashida said that "Kitagawa is very kind and friendly".

Art director Toshiharu Mizutani's previous works includes the anime films Piano no Mori (2007) and Akira (1988). Composer Akira Senju previously composed theme songs for the Fullmetal Alchemist: Brotherhood anime series.

=== Theme song ===
Singer-songwriter Kana Uemura sings the theme song of the film, "Message", which is released on 4 January 2012, her 29th birthday. She is also voice-cast in the film.

== Release ==
Magic Tree House made its debut at the 24th Tokyo International Film Festival on 23 October 2011. It was featured as one of the festival's special screenings. The film was released in Japanese cinemas on 7 January 2012, and was also featured at a release ceremony at Shinjuku Piccadilly that day.

The DVD, Blu-ray & limited edition of the film were released on 3 August 2012.
