= Ned Bittinger =

American portrait painter (born 1951)

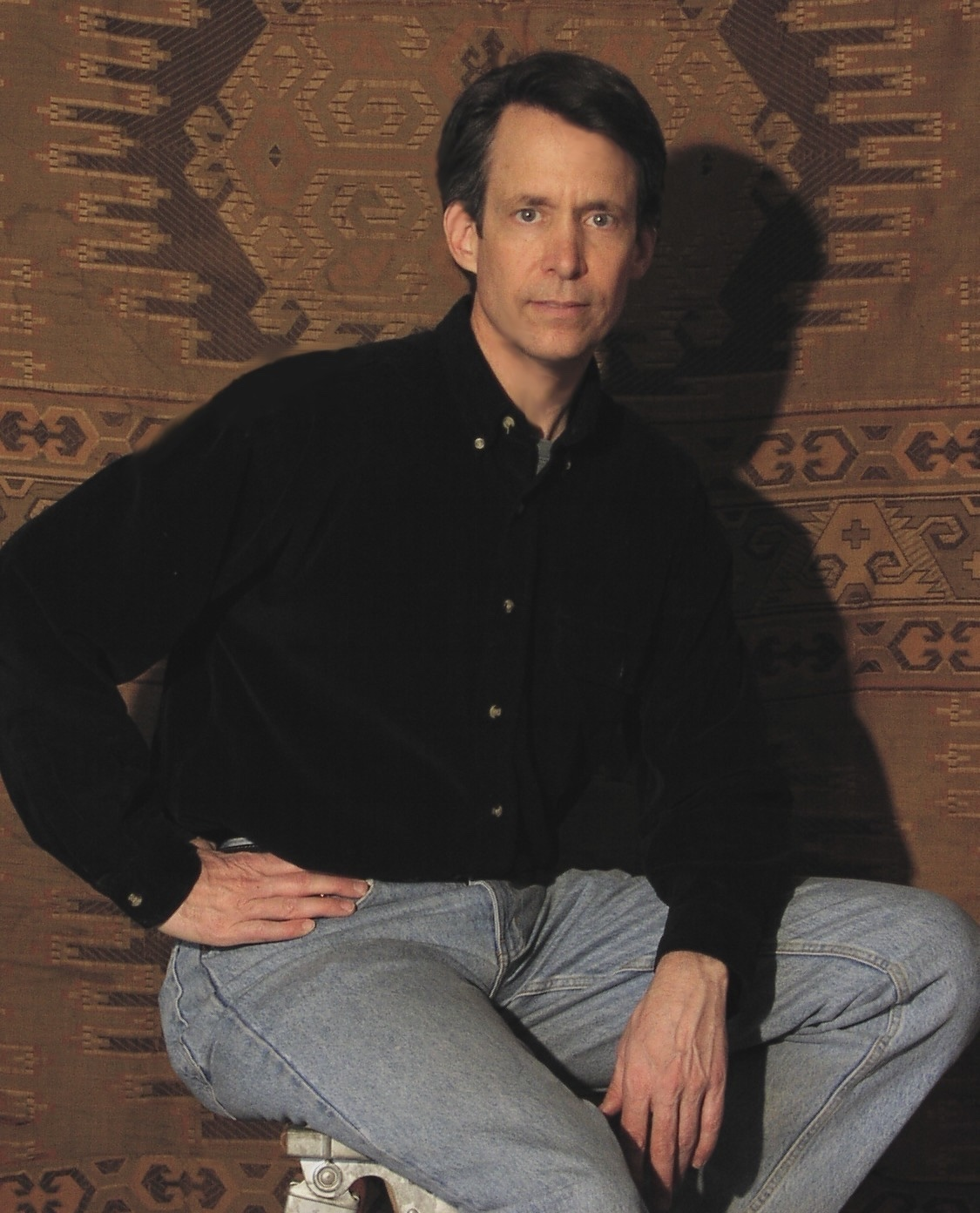
- Bittinger in 2002
- Born: July 4, 1951 (age 75); Washington, D.C., United States
- Education: Denison University (BFA); Corcoran School of the Arts and Design at George Washington University (MFA)
- Notable work: Abraham Lincoln; Corinne Claiborne (Lindy) Boggs; Rocking Horse Christmas; The Matzah That Papa Brought Home; The Blue and the Gray
- Children: 1

Edmund Stuart Bittinger (born July 4, 1951), better known by Ned Bittinger, is an American portrait painter and illustrator who is known for his paintings of prominent American figures. His notable works include the congressional portraits of Abraham Lincoln and Lindy Boggs for the United States Capitol, as well as Secretaries of State James Baker and Lawrence Eagleburger's official State Department portraits. He has also painted official portraits of Henry Kissinger, John Mica, and Jon Corzine, among others.

Bittinger made his debut as an illustrator in 1995 with the Passover Sedar fiction children's book The Matzah That Papa Brought Home, which was met with critical acclaim and became an American Library Association Notable Children's Book and a Notable Book for Younger Readers from the Sydney Taylor Book Award. He later illustrated The Blue and the Gray (1996) and Rocking Horse Christmas (1997), both of which received positive reviews from critics. In 2002, he illustrated his latest book, When the Root Children Wake Up, which is a retelling of Sibylle Von Olfers' book, The Root Children, originally published in 1906.

== Early life and education ==
Ned Bittinger was born in 1951 in Washington, D.C. He started painting and drawing in the third grade. When he was age thirteen, his parents sent him to the Corcoran School of the Arts and Design of Washington, D.C. He attended Landon School in Bethesda, Maryland.

He left to attend Denison University in Ohio, where he received a Bachelor of Fine Arts. In an interview in 2017, Bittinger stated that he originally got an F grade in painting at Denison University.

After graduating, Bittinger briefly got a job at a commercial arts studio. He also began to practice Transcendental Meditation and would become a teacher of the technique. At age 28, he earned his Master of Fine Arts degree from the Corcoran School of the Arts and Design at George Washington University.

== Career ==
Bittinger has received awards and participated in many exhibitions, including an exhibition at the Tretyakov Gallery in Moscow from 1990 to 1991. Bittinger painted two portraits for the 1994 movie Guarding Tess, one of Shirley Maclaine and the other of her husband in the film. In 2017 Bittinger estimated that he had painted between 400 and 500 portraits.

=== Portrait of Abraham Lincoln ===
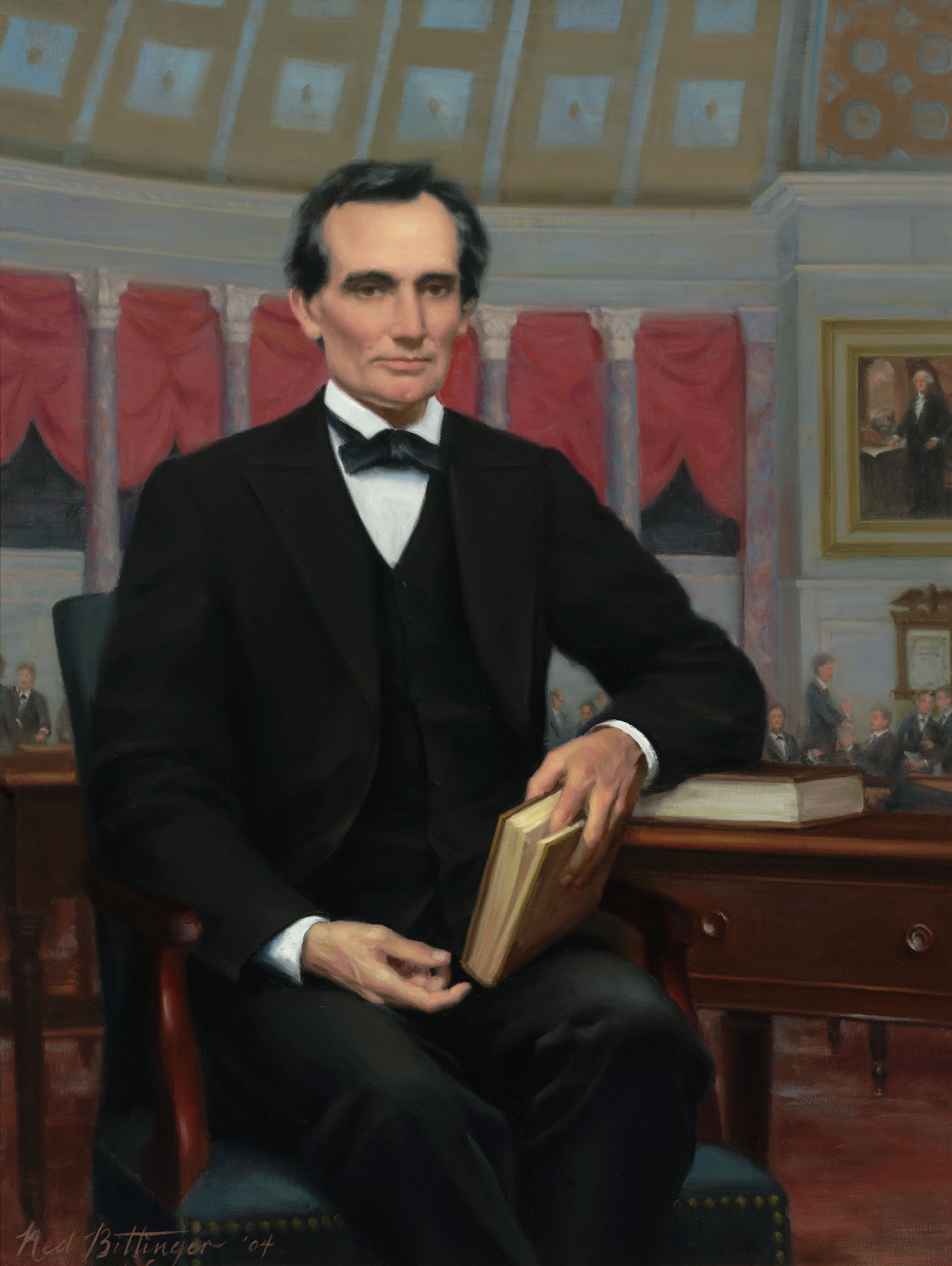
Abraham Lincoln, U.S. House of Representatives

In 2004, the U.S. House of Representatives commissioned Bittinger to paint the official portrait of Abraham Lincoln. The painting depicts Lincoln at a young age from when he served in the House of Representatives from 1847 to 1849. Bittinger worked from photographs of Lincoln's time in Congress as well as historic images of the House Chamber. The setting includes the John Vanderlyn portrait of George Washington, furniture designed by Thomas Constantine, and many details of the House Chamber's appearance in the 1840s, including the red drapery. Lincoln is depicted sitting at his desk in the old Hall of the House, now called National Statuary Hall. The painting is part of a series of 21st-century portraits depicting noteworthy former members of Congress commissioned by the House of Representatives.

=== Portrait of Lindy Boggs ===
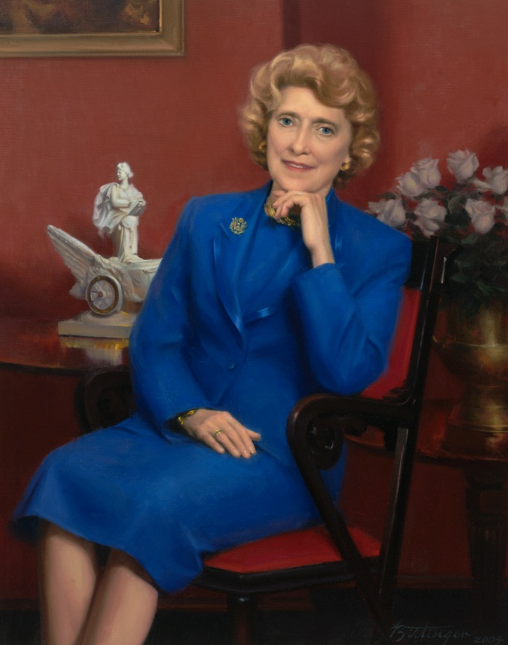
Corinne Claiborne (Lindy) Boggs, U.S. House of Representatives

On September 27, 2004, the portrait of Lindy Boggs was unveiled at the Capitol. The portrait includes a small replica of the Car of History clock which has been present in the Old House Chamber since 1819. This clock was included to show Boggs's love for history and commemorate the Commission of the United States House of Representatives Bicentenary, which she chaired. The portrait hangs in the Lindy Claiborne Boggs Congressional Women's Reading Room in the U.S. Capitol, adjacent to Statuary Hall.

=== Portrait of Henry Kissinger ===
In 2005, Bittinger was commissioned the paint a portrait of Henry Kissinger as Chancellor for the College of William and Mary. "They usher me in, and he looks at me 'who are you' and I say I'm here to paint your portrait, and then I had to pull out this midlevel garb." The portrait depicts Kissinger with his chancellor's robes and chain. Kissinger reportedly objected to using the hat and asked Bittinger not to include it. Bittinger spent the day in Kissinger's office sketching him from life. In a 2017 interview, Bittinger stated that he had also painted Kissinger's dogs at Kissinger's home in Connecticut.

=== Ohio Speakers' Portraits ===
In 2017, the Ohio Statehouse commissioned seven speakers' portraits with three painted by Bittinger, three by Daniel Greene, and one by Leslie Adams. The portraits were unveiled in a ceremony in the Ohio Statehouse Rotunda on May 23, 2017. "The seven portraits broaden the scope and artistic diversity of the Ohio Statehouse’s art collection instantly. These works of art will inspire and educate future leaders of Ohio for generations to come," said The Capitol Square Review and Advisory Board executive director, Laura Battocletti.

=== Books ===
Bittinger first became interested in illustrating children's books after reading an article about Chris Van Allsburg. He then wrote and illustrated a children's book and sent it to two publishers. Both of the publishers liked his illustrations but did not like the story. It took a year before Bittinger got a call from Scholastic to illustrate The Matzah that Papa Brought Home written by Fran Manushkin. The book was well received by critics and received a starred review from Publishers Weekly. The book ended up selling over 50,000 copies and became an American Library Association Notable Children's Book and Notable Book for Younger Readers from the Sydney Taylor Book Award. An article in Albemarle Magazine stated that Manushkin was at first unhappy with his first set of paintings Bittinger created because of his lack of originality. Bittinger painted a second set of paintings for the book spending months on the project, and making a plaster cast of the father in the story so he could make a more accurate profile.

In 1997 Bittinger illustrated Rocking Horse Christmas written by Mary Pope Osborne, which had a positive reaction from the critics. He spent six months on preliminary drawings and then the paintings for the book. He has also illustrated When the Root Children Wake Up, a retelling of Sibylle von Olfers's book The Root Children, originally published in 1906; and The Blue and the Gray written by Eve Bunting which received the Hoosier Young Readers' Award from the children of Indiana and the "Teachers' Choice Award" from The International Readers Association.

Upon release, When the Root Children Wake Up (2002), written by Audrey Wood, received mixed reviews, with Publishers Weekly criticizing Wood's words calling them "slightly forced", while also calling Bittinger's illustrations "a laudable effort, but one that's ultimately less than the sum of its parts". Kirkus Reviews called both the words and images "quite charming", while also pointing out the difference between Wood's story and the original by Olfers: "Wood's tale changes the Root Children's activities from work to play—not a bad thing, but a definite difference".

== Personal life ==
Bittinger and his wife at the time, Mary, moved out of D.C. to Rappahannock County, Virginia. They later divorced and Bittinger moved out west. In a 2017 interview, he explained "It was a neighbor across the street who said, 'Why don't you move to Taos' and I said what the hell is Taos." Bittinger instead decided to move to Santa Fe where he has remained. In the same interview, he stated he has an 11-year-old son.

== Bibliography ==
- The Matzah That Papa Brought Home by Fran Manushkin. Scholastic, 1995.
- The Blue and the Gray by Eve Bunting. Scholastic, 1996.
- Rocking Horse Christmas by Mary Pope Osborne. Scholastic, 1997.
- When the Root Children Wake Up by Audrey Wood. Scholastic, 2002.

== Notable commissions ==
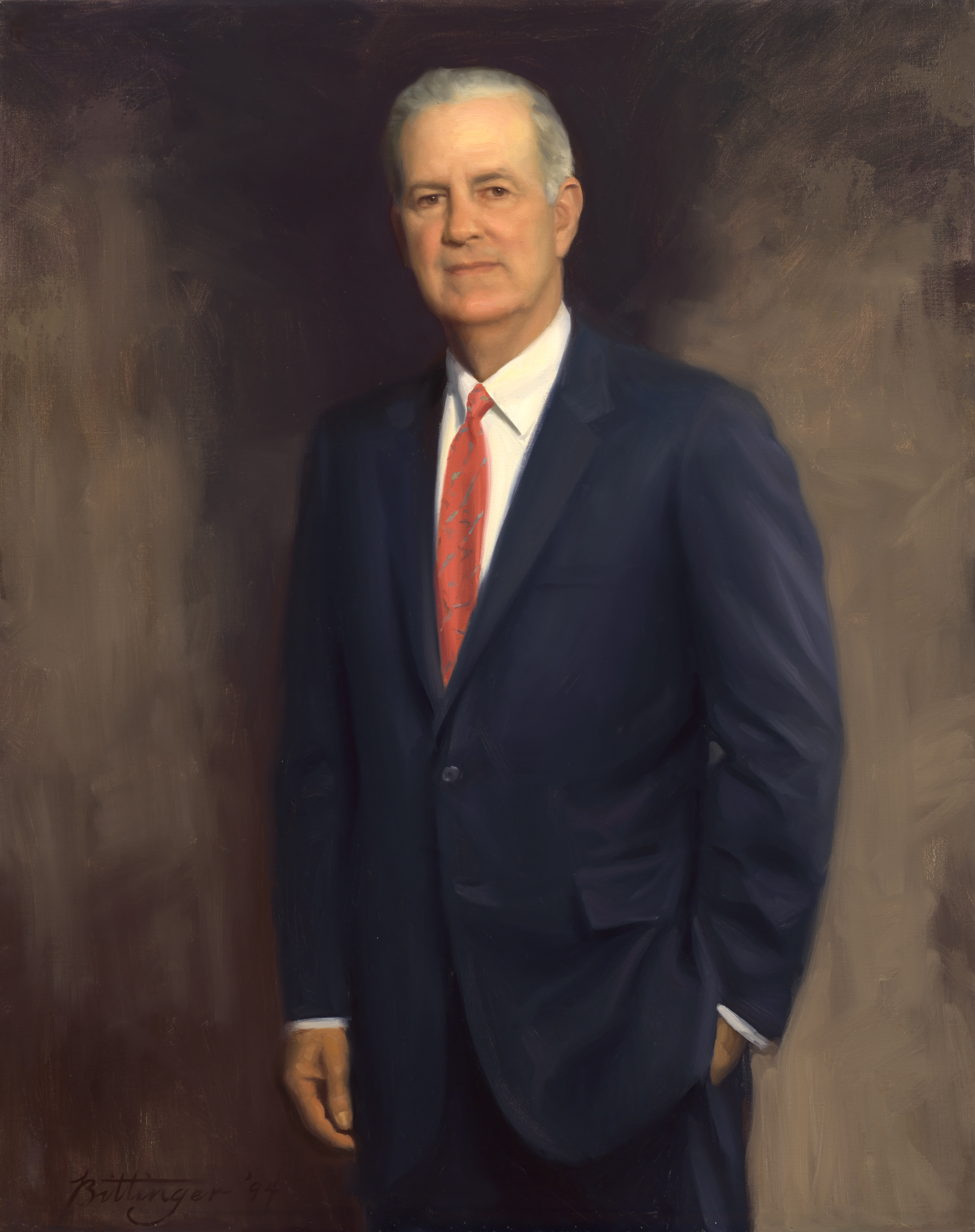
James Baker, Secretary of State, U.S. State Department

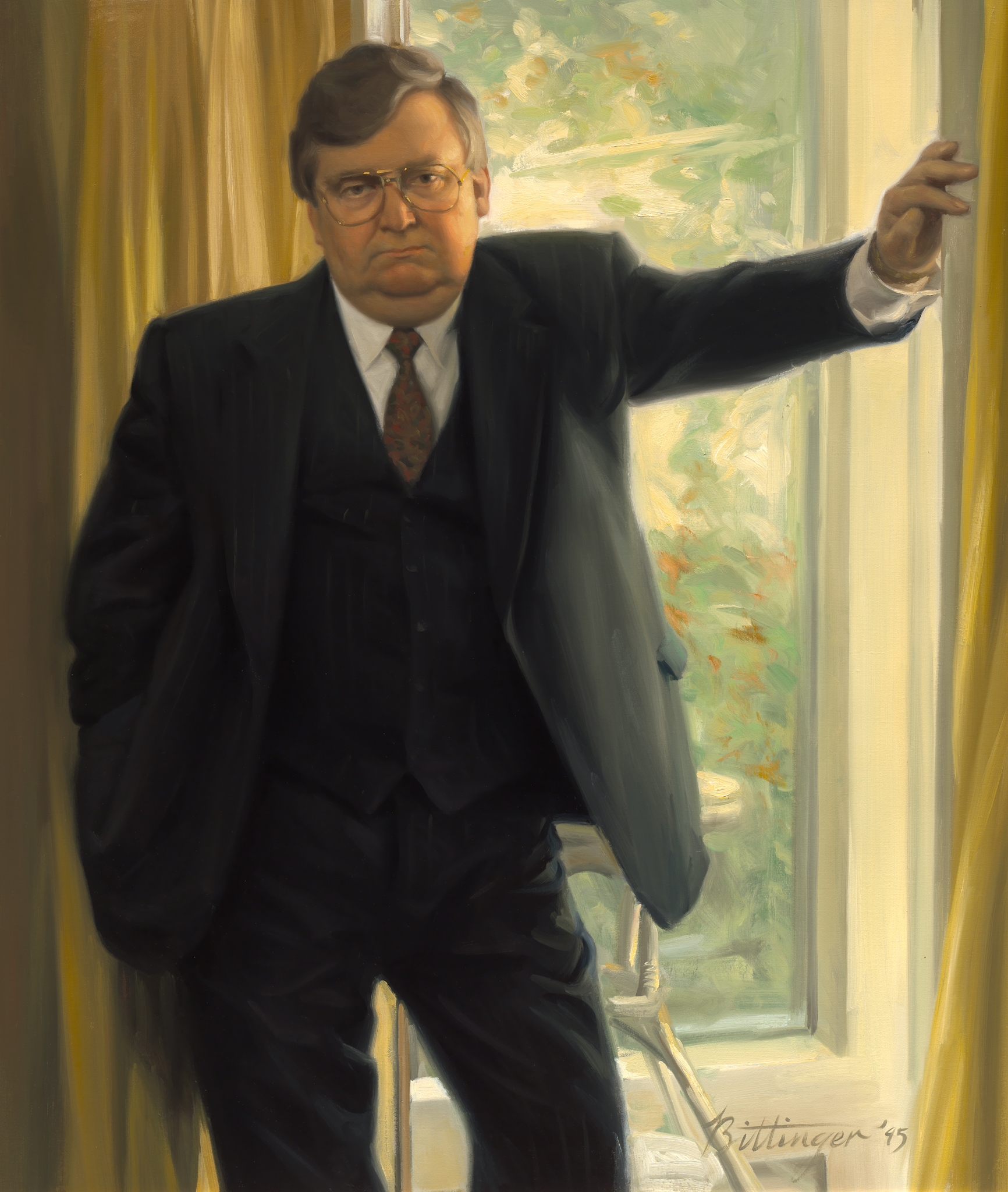
Lawrence Eagleburger, Secretary of State, U.S. State Department

- Lloyd Elliott, President of The George Washington University, Elliott School of International Affairs, 1988
- General Carl Vuono, Chief of Staff of the Army 1991
- James Baker, Secretary of State, US State Department, Washington, D.C., 1994
- General Gordon Sullivan, Chief of Staff of the Army 1994
- Carol Joyce Gray, First Dean of the Johns Hopkins University School of Nursing, 1994
- Lawrence Eagleburger, Secretary of State, US State Department, Washington, D.C., 1995
- Abraham Lincoln, Official portrait for the US House of Representatives, 2004
- Henry Kissinger, Former Secretary of State, College of William & Mary, 2005
- Jack S. Griswold, President, Maryland Historical Society, 2005
- Stanard T. Klinefelter, President, Maryland Historical Society, 2005
- Jon Corzine, former Governor of New Jersey
- Chief Justice Barker, Hamilton County Courthouse, Chattanooga, Tennessee, 2010
- John Mica, US Congressman from Florida, US House of Representatives, 2012
- Judge Roger W. Titus, U.S. District Court for the District of Maryland, 2014
- Lee Yeakel, United States District Judge, 2017
- Jon A. Husted, House Speaker of Ohio, Ohio Statehouse, Columbus, Ohio, 2017
- Charles Kurfess, House Speaker of Ohio, Ohio Statehouse, Columbus, Ohio, 2017
- A. G. Lancione, House Speaker of Ohio, Ohio Statehouse, Columbus, Ohio, 2017
- Kim Schatzel, President, Towson University, 2017
- Gregory Swanson, First African American to attend the University of Virginia, 2018

== Awards ==
- 2003 Honors Award for Portraiture, Portrait Society of America
- 2004 Honors Award for Portraiture, Portrait Society of America
- 2006 The Certificate of Merit, Portrait Society of America
- 2007 Certificate of Excellence, Portrait Society of America
- 2022 1st Place Commissioned Portrait, Members Only Competition, Portrait Society of America
- 2023 Signature Status, Portrait Society of America
- 2023 Finalist Commissioned Portrait, Members Only Competition, Portrait Society of America
- 2023 Finalist Non-Commissioned Portrait, Members Only Competition, Portrait Society of America
- 2023 Finalist Outside the Box, Members Only Competition, Portrait Society of America
