= Sibylle von Olfers =

German art teacher, nun, author and illustrator

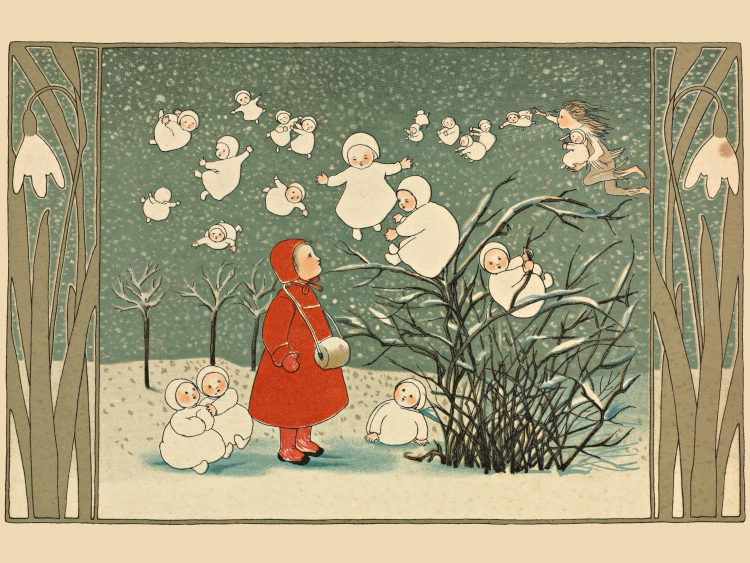
Sibylle von Olfers' Marietje in Sneeuwland

Sibylle von Olfers (8 May 1881, Königsberg – 29 January 1916) was a German art teacher and a nun who worked as an author and illustrator of children's books. In 1906 she published her best-known work, The Root Children (original title: Etwas von den Wurzelkindern, "Something about the children from the roots").

== Life ==
=== Childhood ===
Born Maria Regina Angela Hedwig Sibylla von Olfers, into the noble Olfers family, in the Castle of Metgethen (Schloss Metgethen) on 8 May 1881. The castle was the mansion of Metgethen estate, near Königsberg. At that time the estate lay within the administration district of Samland, but was incorporated by Königsberg in 1939. She was the third oldest of the five children of Ernst Friedrich Franz Gustav Werner Marie von Olfers and his second wife Olga Maria Bertha Freiin Behr. Her father was a Health Counsellor, natural scientist and writer. His first marriage was with the older sister of Sibylle's mother with whom he had had four children. Her paternal aunt Marie von Olfers was a major artistic influence.

Sibylle had a sheltered childhood and enjoyed, together with her brothers and sisters, education and teaching through governesses and private tutors. Her parents also had a cordial relationship with their numerous children. Sibylle was considered a delicate, intelligent girl who revealed her passion for arts very early. According to the notes of her grandmother, she had the soft face of a Madonna but was called a wild bumblebee because she differed so much from other kids with her fantastic games and ideas. Sibylle was referred to as talented and prettier than ever. The grandmother wrote furthermore that in her early years she didn't learn very well because she preferred to amuse herself with fantasies of games during the lessons.

Sibylle von Olfers was close to her younger sister. Sibylle created picture-books for her sister, which influenced her family.

During her childhood, she sometimes showed a silent, childish religiousness. This could especially be seen when she prayed in front of self-erected altars surrounded by numerous candles or when she modeled Madonnas and drew images of saints at her sister's urging.

== Bibliography ==
Books translated into English include:

- The Story of the Root Children
- The Story of the Snow Children
- The Story of the Wind Children
- The Story of the Butterfly Children
- The Story of Little Billy Bluesocks
- The Princess in the Forest

== Literature ==
- Leyen, M. v. d.:„Sibylle von Olfers. Eine Erinnerung“, Berlin 1912 (Privatdruck)
- Olfers, M. v.: Zwei Schwestern. Briefe einer Ordensschwester an ihre in der Welt lebende Schwester, Paderborn 1933
- Oberfeld, Ch.: „Sibylle von Olfers“, in: Doderer, K. (Hrsg.): Lexikon der Kinder und Jugendliteratur. Zweiter Band, Weinheim 1977, 609–610
- Herbst, H.:„Sibylle von Olfers: Etwas von den Wurzelkindern“, in Die Schiefertafel 1983/H. 1, 3–20
- Schindler-Holzapfel, E.:„Ach, wenn's doch immer Sommer wär!“, in Jugendliteratur 1984/H. 3, 17–19
- Berger, M.:„Sibylle von Olfers“, in: Baumgärtner. A. C./Pleticha, H. (Hrsg.): Kinder und Jugendliteratur. Ein Lexikon. 4. Erg. Lfg. 1997, 1–12
- Scherf, W.:„Olfers, Sibylle v.“, in: Historische Kommission der Bayerischen Akademie der Wissenschaften (Hrsg.): Neue Deutsche Biographie. Neunzehnter Band, Berlin 1999, 520–521
