= The Blue and the Gray (picture book) =

Picture Book

- Author: Eve Bunting
- Illustrator: Ned Bittinger
- Published: November 1st, 1996
- Publisher: Scholastic Incorporated

The Blue and the Gray is a 1996 children's fiction picture book by Eve Bunting and illustrated by Ned Bittinger. It was originally published November 1, 1996, by Scholastic.

== Synopsis ==
The story is about two young boys, one black, one white, whose homes are being built within view of an unmarked Civil War battlefield. As they explore the grassy fields near the construction site of their new homes, they learn of the great loss of life that happened there during the war. The book's setting alternates between the present day and 1862 as one of the boys' fathers describes the long-ago battle.

== Reception ==
Publishers Weekly described Bunting's words as "glimmers of the lyricism of which she is capable, but it is marred by occasionally awkward phrasing", while they described Bittinger's illustrations as "capturing every nuance". Kirkus Reviews called Bunting's work "child's brief sentences, but sprinkled with rhyming words and typographically arranged like a poem in short lines that slow the reading to a somber pace", while also applauding Bittinger's oil paintings.

The book was selected by The International Readers Association for their Teachers' Choice Award, and by the children of Indiana for their Hoosier Young Readers’ Award.
