= Jane Wesman =

American businesswoman

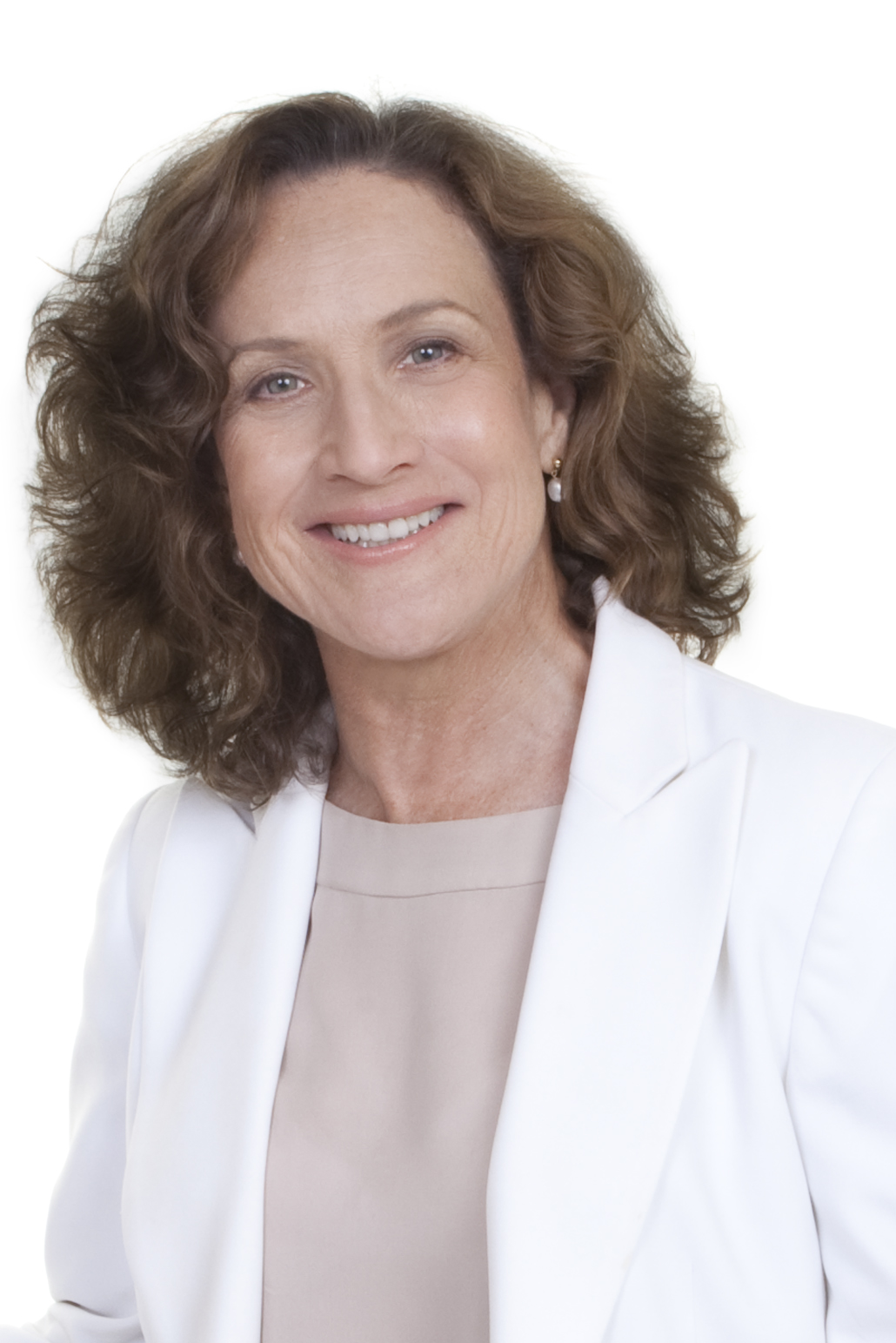
- Portrait of Jane Wesman
- Occupations: President of Jane Wesman Public Relations, Inc.
- Website: https://www.wesmanpr.com/

Jane Wesman is the president of a PR agency based in New York City that focuses on the book publishing industry.

== Biography ==
Jane Wesman was born in New Jersey. She graduated from Simmons College. She married attorney Donald Savelson, who is a partner at Proskauer Rose and chairman of the board of the Bronx Museum of the Arts.

Wesman worked at Grosset & Dunlap, where she was in charge of the campaign for RN: The Memoirs of Richard Nixon (1978).

Wesman founded Jane Wesman Public Relations, a firm specializing in book publicity campaigns, in 1980.

Wesman is the author of Dive Right In: The Sharks Won't Bite (Prentice Hall, 1995).
