= The Matzah That Papa Brought Home =

1995 children's book by Fran Manushkin

- Author: Fran Manushkin
- Illustrator: Ned Bittinger
- Published: 1995
- Publisher: Scholastic Incorporated
- Awards: Sydney Taylor Book Award Notable book (1995) ALA Notable Children's Books (1996)

The Matzah That Papa Brought Home is a 1995 fictional children's picture book by Fran Manushkin and illustrated by Ned Bittinger. It was originally published 1995, by Scholastic. It has been awarded Notable Children's Books by the American Library Association and Notable Book for Younger Readers from the Sydney Taylor Book Award.

The story is written like a cumulative rhyme which tells the story of a family's celebration of the Passover Seder.

== Reception ==
A starred review in Publishers Weekly compliments the book's "cumulative text" and "easy and unforced" rhymes and describes Bittinger's character studies as "gems". The School Library Journal described the text as "great fun" and the illustrations as "stellar". A review from Booklist calls Bittinger's illustrations "double-page-spread oil paintings that glow as brightly as the candles on the seder table", while The Horn Book Magazine called the atmosphere of the book "festive and ritualistic".

In 1995 the Sydney Taylor Book Award awarded the book with their Notable Young Readers award. The American Library Association gave it the Notable Children's Books award in 1996. It was also an American Bookseller Pick of the Lists.

It sold more than 50,000 copies.
