= Fran Manushkin =

American children's book author

- Born: November 2, 1942 (age 83); Chicago, Illinois
- Education: University of Illinois; Roosevelt University; Chicago Teachers College
- Occupation: Author

Fran Manushkin (born November 2, 1942) is an American children's book author. She originally began as a children's book editor before transferring to an author.

Manushkin attended the University of Illinois Chicago and Roosevelt University. she received a Bachelor of Arts in education from Chicago Teachers College. She has authored over 20 children's books receiving high critical acclaim. She received the Notable Children's book citation award from the Association of Jewish Libraries in 2000, for her book Come Let Us Be Joyful: The Story of Hava Nagila.

== Biography ==
Upon graduating high school, Manushkin attended college and earned a teaching certificate. After four months of being a substitute teacher, she decided to live in New York City, and become a publisher. Manushkin worked for many publishers including Henry Holt and Company, Rinehart & Winston, Harper & Row, and Random House. The first book that she wrote was Baby, and was published in 1972. Manushkin would later author many more books and also team up with celebrity boxer George Forman on the book Let George Do It!, which recounts misadventures in the real-life Foreman family. She still resides in New York City.

== List of books ==
- Let George Do It!, Authored by Fran Manushkin and George Foreman, Illustrated by Whitney Martin.
- Rachel, Meet Your Angel, Authored by Fran Manushkin.
- The Matzah That Papa Brought Home, illustrated by Ned Bittinger.
- Many Days, One Shabbat, illustrated by Maria Monescillo.
- Happy in Our Skin, Illustrated by Lauren Tobia.
- Bamboo for Me, Bamboo for You!, illustrated by Purificación Hernández.
- THE LITTLE SLEEPYHEAD, illustrated by Leonid Gore.
- The Shivers in the Fridge, illustrated by Paul O. Zelinsky.
- The Belly Book, illustrated by Dan Yaccarino.
- Peeping and Sleeping CL, illustrated by Jennifer Plecas.
- DAUGHTERS OF FIRE: Heroines of the Bible, illustrated by Uri Shulevitz.
- How Mama Brought the Spring, illustrated by Holly Berry.
- Let's Go Riding in Our Strollers, illustrated by Benrei Huang.
- Latkes and Applesauce: A Hanukkah Story, illustrated by Robin Spowart.
- HOORAY FOR HANUKKAH!, illustrated by Carolyn Croll.
- The Perfect Christmas Picture, illustrated by Karen A. Weinhaus.
- Plenty of Hugs, illustrated by Kate Alizadeh.
