= Mary Pope Osborne =

American children's book writer (born 1949)

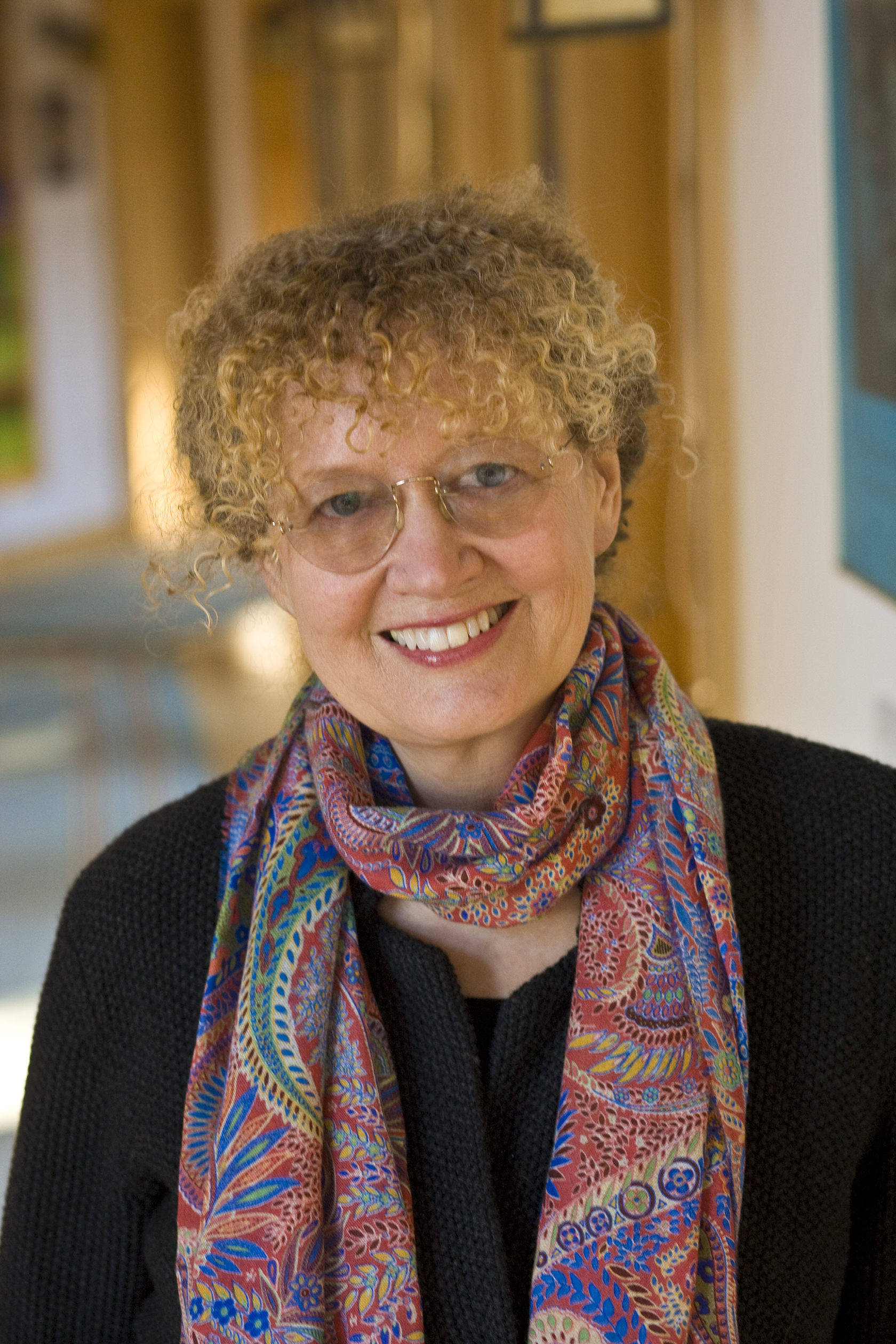
- Mary Pope Osborne, photographed in 2012 by Elena Seibert
- Born: Mary Pope; May 20, 1949 (age 77); Fort Sill, Oklahoma, U.S.
- Occupation: Writer
- Spouse: Will Osborne (m. 1976)
- Writing career
- Years active: 1982–present
- Genres: Children's picture books; fantasy; myths and fairy tales retold; American biography and fictional diary
- Notable works: Magic Tree House; Rocking Horse Christmas
- Website: mthclassroomadventures.org

Mary Pope Osborne (born May 20, 1949) is an American author of children's books and audiobook narrator. She is best known as the author of the Magic Tree House series, which as of 2017 sold more than 134 million copies worldwide. Both the series and Osborne have won awards, including for Osborne's charitable efforts at promoting children's literacy. She had 3 other siblings, and moved around in her childhood before attending the University of North Carolina. Following college, Osborne traveled before moving to New York City. She somewhat spontaneously began to write, and her first book was published in 1982. She went on to write a variety of other children's and young adult books before starting the Magic Tree House series in 1992. Osborne's sister Natalie Pope Boyce has written several compendium books to the Magic Tree House series, sometimes with Osborne's husband Will.

== Early life and education ==
Mary Pope Osborne grew up in a military family, alongside her sister, Natalie Pope Boyce, her twin brother, Bill, and younger brother, Michael. Her father's career required the family to travel rather extensively and regularly move. As a child, Osborne lived in Salzburg, Austria, as well as Oklahoma and Virginia. Osborne herself says of the experience: "Moving was never traumatic for me, but staying in one place was.” After her father retired, her family settled in a small town in North Carolina. Osborne grew invested in the local community theater, spending all her free time there.

Mary Pope Osborne initially studied drama at the University of North Carolina; In her junior year, however, she switched to a major in religion with a focus on comparative religions. After graduating from UNC in 1971, Osborne and a friend went traveling. For six weeks, she camped out in a cave on the island of Crete. Following this, Osborne joined a small group of Europeans heading to the East. Their journey took Osborne through eleven countries throughout Asia, including Iraq, Iran, India, Nepal, Afghanistan, Turkey, Lebanon, Syria, and Pakistan. The trip came to an end when Osborne experienced blood poisoning requiring her to stay in a hospital for a couple of weeks where she read The Lord of the Rings. Remarking on her travels Osborne said, ""That journey irrevocably changed me. The experience was gathered that serves as a reference point every day of my life. I encountered worlds of light and worlds of darkness--and planted seeds of the imagination that led directly to my being an author of children's books."

After her travels, Osborne lived in California, Washington D.C., where she met her husband Will at a theater performance, and New York, where the couple moved after getting married in 1976. During this time, she held jobs including medical assistant, travel agent, drama teacher, bartender, and as an assistant editor for a children's magazine.

== Career ==
Mary Pope Osborne has written over 60 children's stories, with a variety of genres and for a range of children to young adult audiences. Her books have been named to a number of the Best Books of the Year Lists, including, School Library Journal, Parents’ Magazine, The Bulletin of the Center for Children's Books, and Bank Street College. She has received honors from such organizations as the National Council of Teachers of English, The Children's Book Council, and the International Reading Association. She received the 1992 Diamond State Reading Association Award, 2005 Ludington Memorial Award from the Educational Paperback Association and the 2010 Heidelberger Leander Award. She has also received awards from the Carolina Alumni Association, the Virginia Library Association and in spring 2013 she was awarded an Honorary Doctorate of Letters from the University of North Carolina at Chapel Hill.

Ms. Osborne served two separate terms as president of the Authors Guild and also chaired its Children's Book Committee. She has since traveled extensively in the states and throughout the world, visiting schools and speaking on issues related to reading and books. In 2011, she attended the International Tokyo Film Festival for the premier of the Magic Tree House anime film and visited schools in the tsunami-hit area of Japan. The film grossed 5.7 million dollars; Osborne donated all her proceeds into her educational works.

She was profiled on NBC's Rock Center with Brian Williams for her continued efforts to get books into the hands of underserved children on a Magic Tree House-themed tour bus. She spoke of the pressure she feels as an author that children look up to, "for a child to value someone who writes books is so extraordinary."

To celebrate the 20th anniversary of the Magic Tree House series in 2012, Ms. Osborne created a Magic Tree House Classroom Adventures Program. Ms. Osborne's mission with Classroom Adventures is to inspire children to read and to love reading while simultaneously helping kids to read at grade level by the end of 3rd grade. Free of charge, the program provides a set of online educational resources for teachers and allows for Title 1 schools to apply for free Magic Tree House books. Under Classroom Adventures, Ms. Osborne, in partnership with the First Book organization in Washington, D.C., has donated hundreds of thousands of Magic Tree House books to underserved schools.

=== Writing and publication ===
Osborne's travels and experiences have factored largely into her own writing, while her writing has allowed her to experience some of the thrills of traveling, as she said, "Without even leaving my home, I’ve traveled around the globe, learning about the religions of the world."

Osborne's writing career began "one day, out of the blue" when she wrote Run, Run As Fast As You Can in 1982. The book itself is semi-autobiographical in nature, according to Osborne: "The girl was a lot like me and many of the incidents in the story were similar to happenings in my childhood." The book served as the starting point for Osborne's writing career. Her early work received mixed reviews. Her work includes young adult novels, picture books, retellings of mythology and fairy tales, biographies, mysteries, a six-part series of the Odyssey, a book of American Tall Tales, and a book for young readers about the major world religions.

Osborne says that she can work on Magic Tree House up to 12 hours a day and seven days a week and has used space at shared office space, The Writer's Room. She has modeled her writing after Hemingway by trying to be simple and direct and is "noted for writing clear, lively, well-paced prose in both her stories and her informational books."

== Magic Tree House series ==
Mary Pope Osborne's most prolific work has been the Magic Tree House series. The series has sold more than 134 million books worldwide since its debut in 1992 and as of 2007 the series had spent a total 132 weeks on The New York Times Best Seller list. Owing to the successful sales of the books, Osborne for many years resisted efforts to commercialize the characters and books wanting them to live in the imaginations of children.

The first of the Magic Tree House books, Dinosaurs Before Dark, was published in 1992. She was initially inspired to write the books while working in a teen homeless shelter and realizing that for the teens writing themselves into stories taking place in the Himalayas or Serengeti had a major effect on them. Osborne says she tried writing the book seven different ways before finding a way that worked." It introduces the main characters of Jack and Annie, a brother and sister duo of adventurers who are transported to different areas of time thanks to the titular magic treehouse. The first book established the format for future books and introduced recurring characters Morgan le Fay and Merlin, as part of the Arthurian motifs. Osborne says she is more like Jack but wishes she were more like Annie.

Osborne tends to place small cliffhangers at the end of each chapter, which has been highlighted as one of the major reasons for the appeal of the books within their target age group. Another important factor in their success is the educational nature of the series. The books are cited for their ability to interest students in history and Osborne’s usage of vocabulary encourages young readers to learn new words and for their promoting gratitude and cross-cultural understanding in its readers.

=== Adaptations ===
==== Magic Tree House Children's Theatre ====
The Magic Tree House brand has taken on other forms. A full-scale musical adaptation was created by Will Osborne and Randy Court; Magic Tree House: The Musical, premiered in September 2007. Osborne hoped that it would have the same kind of kid and adult appeal as The Lion King or Mary Poppins. Based on the Magic Tree House book Christmas in Camelot, the Musical has toured nationally and had a cast album.

A planetarium show; Magic Tree House: Space Mission, also created by Will Osborne, is produced and presented exclusively at the Morehead Planetarium in Chapel Hill, North Carolina.

In 2011, Will Osborne collaborated with New Orleans composer Allen Toussaint and Ain't Misbehavin' co-creator Murray Horwitz to write A Night in New Orleans, a musical adaptation of Magic Tree House #42: A Good Night for Ghosts about the life of Louis Armstrong. The show features an ensemble cast and live jazz band. It premiered in 2012 at the New Jersey Performing Arts Center and was shown free to every Newark 4th grade student.

Magic Tree House Kids Shows are theatrical adaptations of selected titles in the Magic Tree House series designed specifically for performance by kids. To date, children's shows have been created by husband and wife playwright and composer team Randy Courts and Jenny Laird in collaboration with Will Osborne based on the following Magic Tree House books: Dinosaurs Before Dark, The Knight at Dawn, Pirates Past Noon, A Ghost Tale for Christmas Time, A Night in New Orleans, and Stage Fright on a Summer Night, a new children's show based on the life of William Shakespeare premiered at the Orlando Shakespeare Theatre in October 2017.

==== Film adaptation ====
In 2011, the series was adapted as a Japanese animated fantasy film, Magic Tree House (マジック・ツリーハウス, Majikku Tsurī Hausu). The film was directed by Hiroshi Nishikiori and the screenplay, written by Ichiro Okouchi, was based on the Japanese version of the novel series "Magic Tree House".

In 2016, Lionsgate acquired the film rights with a script by Will Osborne and Jenny Laird. The film would primarily contain plot elements from Book #29, Christmas in Camelot. As of 2021 no further news about this movie has been reported.

== Personal life ==
Osborne was married to Will Osborne in 1976, meeting him after seeing him appear in a play. Mary has cited the key role Will plays in her writing saying, "Will has given me the support and encouragement I've needed to be a professional daydreamer - in other words, an author of children's books." Will and Mary also work with Mary's sister Natalie, on the non-fiction fact trackers. Mary notes that the three of them enjoy doing book tours together. She does not have any children, which she has explained as "I got too busy."

Her lakefront home features a treehouse.

== Other books ==
Mary Pope Osborne has written many books outside the Magic Tree House series.

- Run, Run As Fast As You Can (Random House Children's Books, 1982)
- The Deadly Power of Medusa (Scholastic, 1988), Will and Mary Pope Osborne, illustrated by Steve Sullivan
- Jason and the Argonauts (Scholastic, 1988), Will and Mary Pope Osborne, illustrated by Steve Sullivan
- Favorite Greek Myths (Scholastic, 1989), retold by Osborne, illustrated by Troy Howell
- American Tall Tales (Knopf, 1991), retold by Osborne, illustrated by Michael McCurdy
- Spider Kane and the Mystery under the May-apple (Knopf, 1992), illustrated by Victoria Chess — middle-grade chapter book, first of the Spider Kane series
- Mermaid Tales from Around the World (Scholastic, 1993), retold by Osborne, illustrated by Troy Howell
- Haunted Waters (Candlewick, 1994), young-adult fantasy novel
- Favorite Norse Myths (Scholastic, 1996), retold by Osborne, illustrated by Troy Howell
- Rocking Horse Christmas (Scholastic, 1997), illustrated by Ned Bittinger
- Favorite Medieval Tales (Scholastic, 1998), retold by Osborne, illustrated by Troy Howell
- Standing in the Light: The Captive Diary of Catharine Carey Logan, Delaware Valley, Pennsylvania, 1763 (Dear America series, Scholastic, 1998)
- My Secret War: The World War II Diary of Madeline Beck (Dear America, Scholastic, 2000)
- My Brother's Keeper (My America series, Scholastic, 2000), first of three Virginia's Civil War Diary
- Kate and the Beanstalk (Atheneum Books, 2000), picture book illustrated by Giselle Potter — adaptation of the traditional fairy tale Jack and the Beanstalk
- Tales from the Odyssey (Hyperion Books, 2002 to 2005), illustrated by Troy Howell — six children's novels adapted from Odyssey
- Tales from the Odyssey (Hyperion, 2010), a two-volume edition
- Moonhorse (Dragonfly Books, 2010), chapter book
- Johnny Appleseed
- The Life of Jesus in Masterpieces of Art (Viking: Penguin Putnam, 1998)

== Audiobooks (Excerpt) ==
- 2005: Magic Tree House Collection: Books 17-24, Random House UK Ltd, EAN 9780307245267 (read by the author)
- 2011: Magic Tree House Collection: Books 1-8 (read by the author, Listening Library publishing & Audible)
