= Les Parrott =

Author of Christian self-help books

Les Parrott III
- Education: M.A., Theology; Ph.D., Clinical Psychology
- Occupations: Professor, author, motivational speaker
- Spouse: Leslie Parrott
- Website: http://www.lesandleslie.com/

Alonzo Leslie Parrott is an American author of Christian self-help books, a professor of psychology at Northwest University, and an ordained Nazarene minister. He is the creator of the SYMBIS Assessment, and founder of the Parrott Institute for Healthy Relationships at Olivet Nazarene University. He and his wife, Leslie Parrott, are the founders of the Center for Relationship Development at Seattle Pacific University where they taught courses out of the Marriage and Family Therapy and psychology departments.

== Early life ==
Parrott is the son of A. Leslie Parrott Jr., former president of Olivet Nazarene University.

== Media ==
Parrott has appeared on a variety of television shows. He hosts a weekly radio program called Love Talk.

== Personal life ==
Parrott and his wife, Dr. Leslie Parrott, live in Seattle, Washington. They married in 1984 and have two sons, John and Jackson.

== Marriage Enrichment ==
Les Parrot along with his wife, Leslie Parrot, are the creators of the SYMBIS (Save Your Marriage Before It Starts) assessment tool that guides pre-marital couples.
