= The Ape-Man Within =

1995 non-fiction book by Lyon Sprague de Camp

- Dust-jacket for The Ape-Man Within
- Author: L. Sprague de Camp
- Language: English
- Subject: Science
- Publisher: Prometheus Books
- Publication date: 1995
- Publication place: United States
- Media type: Print (Hardback)
- Pages: 266 pp
- ISBN: 0-87975-951-8
- OCLC: 32088692
- Dewey Decimal: 573.2 20
- LC Class: GN281.4 .D43 1995

The Ape-Man Within is a 1995 science book by L. Sprague de Camp, published in hardcover by Prometheus Books.

== Summary ==
The book undertakes to demonstrate how humankind's self-inflicted problems are rooted in its evolutionary past, with primitive survival traits appropriate to ancestral primates who were organized in small, foraging bands still manifesting in modern societies as competitive, adversarial behavior.

== Contents ==
- 1. Darwinian Man
- 2. Our Handy Kin
- 3. The Noble Savage
- 4. The Breeds of Man
- 5. The Phantom Aryans
- 6. Race and Power
- 7. Goat Island
- 8. What Makes Us Tick?
- 9. "And Hate Alone Is True"
- 10. Conclusions
- Notes
- Bibliography

== Reception ==
De Camp's approach to his subject has been criticized for oversimplification and inaccuracy in matters of detail.
