= Eve Bunting =

Northern Irish-American author (1929–2023)

- Born: December 19, 1928; Maghera, Northern Ireland
- Died: October 1, 2023 (aged 94); Santa Cruz, California, U.S.
- Education: Methodist College Belfast; Queen's University Belfast
- Occupations: Children's author, novelist, freelance writer, college instructor
- Writing career
- Period: 1972–2017
- Genres: Young adult fiction, science fiction, historical fiction, children's non-fiction
- Notable awards: Golden Kite Award (1976); Edgar Award (1993); Regina Medal (1997)

Eve Bjørgum Bunting (née Bolton, December 19, 1928 – October 1, 2023), better known as Eve Bunting, was a Northern Irish-born American writer of more than 250 books. Her work covered a broad array of subjects and included fiction and non-fiction books. Her novels are primarily aimed at children and young adults, but she has also written the text for picture books. While many of her books are set in Northern Ireland where she grew up, her topics and settings range from Thanksgiving to riots in Los Angeles. Bunting's first book, The Two Giants, was published in 1971. Due to the popularity of her books with children, she has been listed as one of the Educational Paperback Association's top 100 authors.

== Life ==
Eve Bjørgum Bunting was born in Maghera to Sloan Edmund Bolton, a postmaster, and Mary (née Canning) Bolton, a homemaker. She married business executive Edward Davidson Bunting, whom she met in college, on March 26, 1950, and has three children. She was educated in Belfast, Northern Ireland, attending Methodist College in the early 1940s and graduating in 1945; she then attended Queen's University, where she met her husband. After marrying, the couple moved to Scotland and started their family.

In 1958, Bunting immigrated to the United States with her husband and three children, later attending Pasadena City College in 1959. Bunting then enrolled in a community college writing course. Of her first published story, The Two Giants, she said, "I thought everybody in the world knew that story, and when I found they didn't - well, I thought they should."

Bunting died of pneumonia in Santa Cruz, California, on October 1, 2023, at the age of 94.

== Literary career ==
Bunting went to school in Northern Ireland and grew up with story-telling: "There used to be Shanachies...the Shanachie was a storyteller who went from house to house telling his tales of ghosts and fairies, of old Irish heroes and battles still to be won. Maybe I'm a bit of a Shanachie myself, telling stories to anyone who will listen".

=== Awards ===
Bunting won several awards for her books. She received the Rishabh award for outstanding inspiration. She received the Golden Kite Award from the Society of Children's Book Writers and Illustrators in 1976 for One More Flight. Other honors included the Southern California council on Literature for Children and Young People Award, PEN Los Angeles Center Literacy Award for Special Achievement in Children's Literature, and Southern California council on Literature for Children and Young People Award Excellence is a Series Award. Coffin on a Case won an Edgar Award for Best Juvenile from the Mystery Writers of America in 1993.

Bunting also received the Heal the World award from a school. A young reader wrote Bunting to notify her of the achievement. She said, "It is among the most cherished honors I have ever received and the plaque hangs proudly above my desk."

== Selected works ==
=== Fiction ===
- The Cart that Carried Martin (2013), illustrated by Don Tate
- One Green Apple (2006), illustrated by Ted Lewin
- The Blue and the Gray (1996), illustrated by Ned Bittinger
- Dandelions (1995)
- Ghosts of Departure Point (1982)
- A Day's Work (1994)
- Coffin on a Case! (1992) — Edgar Award for Best Juvenile Mystery
- A Turkey for Thanksgiving (1991), illustrated by Diane de Groat
- Fly Away Home (1991)

A father and son are homeless and they sleep at the airport; they do their best to not get caught by security. The son watches the planes fly away and hopes one day he will be able to leave. Adapted to television as an episode of the PBS television series Reading Rainbow, with the host LeVar Burton addressing the issue of homelessness that can affect people and even families.

- Gleam and Glow (1991)

Viktor finds hope from two fishes during a harsh war in the 1990s.

- The Ghost Children (1989)
- How Many Days to America? (1988)

This book describes a family secretly leaving their country and taking a small boat to America. When they reach America, they celebrate and have Thanksgiving. This is a very powerful Thanksgiving story.

- Is Anybody There? (1988) — Edgar nominee
- Scary, Scary Halloween (1986), illustrated by Jan Brett
- Face at the Edge of the World (1985) — Adapted to television as "A Desperate Exit", an installment of the ABC Afterschool Special series (Season 15, Episode 1; aired September 19, 1986) starring Malcolm-Jamal Warner.
- The Mask (1978)
- The Memory String (2000)

A young girl remembers her family, including her mother, by a string full of buttons. Each button belongs to a certain family member and memory. She is dealing with change as her stepmother and father paint the house. This story focuses on how the young girl copes with the pain of losing her father and gaining a stepmother.

- Terrible Things: An Allegory of the Holocaust (1980), illustrated by Stephen Gammell

Woodland animals living in a clearing are taken away one group at a time by the Terrible Things from their forest home, the abductions going unquestioned. The other animals, out of fear, turn a blind eye as their neighbors are taken. A little white rabbit reflects that if perhaps the animals had stood together, the Terrible Things might have been stopped.

- Moonstick: The Seasons of the Sioux (1997), illustrated by John Sandford
- Twinnies. Illustrated by Nancy Carpenter. Harcourt Brace, 1997.
- Nasty, Stinky Sneakers (1994) — 1997 Sequoyah Children's Book Award
- Night Tree (1991), illustrated by Ted Rand

A family travels through a forest and decorates a Christmas tree with oranges and popcorn. They sing and drink hot chocolate with the animals. The family leaves the tree for the animals to celebrate Christmas.

- One More Flight (1976), illustrated by Diane de Groat — Golden Kite Award from the Society of Children's Book Writers and Illustrators
- The Presence: A Ghost Story (2003)
- Little Bear’s Little Boat. Illustrated by Nancy Carpenter. Clarion Books, 2003.
- S.O.S. Titanic (1996)
- The Lambkins (2005)
- That's What Leprechauns Do (2006)
- Sixth-Grade Sleepover (1986) — 1989 Sequoyah Children's Book Award
- Smoky Night (1994), illustrated by David Díaz

A young boy wakes up in the middle of the night and his family is forced to leave their house due to riots. Despite hatred in the city, two families are bonded by the events. Díaz won the annual Caldecott Medal for American children's illustration.

- So Far from the Sea (1998) — Illustrated by Chris K. Soentpiet

A young Japanese American girl visits her grandfather's grave at Manzanar with her parents and younger brother.

- Someone is Hiding on Alcatraz Island (1984)
- Spying on Miss Muller (1995) — Edgar nominee

Four boarding school students in 1940s Belfast suspect their teacher of spying for the Germans.

- A Sudden Silence (1988)

Jesse Harmon searches for the hit-and-run serial killer who killed his brother Bry.

- A Picnic in October. Illustrated by Nancy Carpenter. Harcourt Brace, 1999.
- The Summer of Riley (2001)
- The Man with the Red Bag (2007)
- The Wall (1990). Illustrated by Ronald Himler.

A young boy and his father arrive at the Vietnam Veterans Memorial in Washington D.C. to look for the name of the boy's grandfather that he never knew; his grandfather had served and died during the war when the boy's father was younger. While there, he observes the tributes left behind by families and other veterans along with their reactions. Adapted to television as an episode of Reading Rainbow, with the host LeVar Burton visiting the site and featuring an interview with Maya Lin who designed the memorial.

- Big Bear’s Big Boat. Illustrated by Nancy Carpenter. Clarion Books, 2013.

=== Non-fiction ===
- The Great White Shark (1982)
- The Sea World Book of Sharks (1984)
- The Sea World Book of Whales (1987)
- Skateboards: How to Make Them, How to Ride Them (1977)
