= Marie von Olfers =

German writer, illustrator and salonnière (1826–1924)

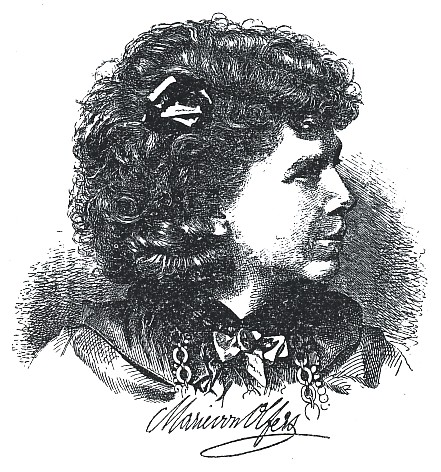
Marie von Olfers

Marie von Olfers (27 October 1826, Berlin – 8 January 1924, Berlin) was a German noblewoman, writer, illustrator and salonnière. She wrote under the pseudonym M(aria) Werner, Werner Maria.

== Biography ==
Born into the noble Olfers family, she was the second daughter of the Ignaz von Olfers, a museum director, and his wife, Hedwig von Staegemann (1799-1871), herself a writer. She also had a major artistic influence on her niece .

== Works ==
- Drei Märchen. Zum Besten einer armen Waise (1862)
- Herr Mops. Ein Mährchen (1863)
- Frau Evchen. Eine sehr alltägliche Historie (1865)
- Novellen (1872)
- Eigenthum (Novelle, in: Deutsche Rundschau, 1. Jg. Bd. 2, 1875)
- Neue Novellen (1876)
- Nathanael (1880)
- Zeichen- und Mal-Fibel (1882)
- Der Sohn des Herzens (1882)
- Vielliebchen. Ein Blumenmärchen (1882)
- Ragenhart und Swanhild. Ein Harzepos aus dem achten Jahrhundert in 12 Gesängen (1883)
- Simplizitas (Episches Gedicht, 1884)
- Die Vernunftheirath und andere Novellen (1887)
- Backfische und Alte Jungfern (Novellen, 1897)
- Zwei Novellen. Jeremias und die schöne Vincenzia, Frau Evchen (1907)
- Maximiliane Gräfin von Oriola, geb. von Arnim. Eine Jugenderinnerung (in: Illustrierte Frauen-Zeitung, 22. Jg., Heft 4)
- Briefe und Tagebücher, hrsg. v. Margarete von Olfers (1928–1930)
  - Band 1: 1826–1870
  - Band 2: 1870–1924
- Rosenwölkchen (Roskow, 9 September)

== Bibliography ==
- Heinrich Groß: Deutsche Dichterinen und Schriftstellerinen in Wort & Bild: Fr. Thiel, Berlin 1885, S. 258ff.
- Petra Wilhelmy-Dollinger: Die Berliner Salons: Mit historisch-literarischen Spaziergängen. Walter de Gruyter, Berlin 2000, ISBN 3-11-016414-0.
