= Half the House: A Memoir =

1995 book by Richard Hoffman

Half the House - a memoir
- Cover
- Author: Richard Hoffman
- Language: English
- Genre: Memoir
- Publisher: Harcourt Brace and New Rivers Press (with postscript)
- Publication date: 1995
- Publication place: United States
- Media type: Print (Hardback & Paperback)
- Pages: 2180 pp (New Rivers Press paperback edition)
- ISBN: 0-89823-228-7 (paperback edition)

Half the House: a memoir is written by Richard Hoffman. It was first published in 1995, then republished in 2005 with an afterword from 1996 and a postscript from 2005.

Hoffman writes after the dedication page that "This is not a work of fiction. It contains no composite characters, no invented scenes. I have, in most instances, altered the names of persons outside my family. In one instance, on principle, I have not."

That one person is Tom Feifel, the coach who abused the 10-year-old Hoffman.

== Plot outline ==
Half the House depicts Hoffman's family as his parents struggle to care for two of his brothers who are terminally ill with muscular dystrophy. Hoffman recounts the sexual abuse he suffered at the age of ten by Tom Feifel, the coach of the 110 pound football team. Feifel spends a lot of time with Scooter, a boy a grade ahead of Hoffman at school. Feifel starts to pick Hoffman up for practice and shows him pornography. Hoffman becomes his new favored companion and is shown adult pornography on 8mm movies and pornographic cartoons featuring Disney cartoon characters. He was repeatedly molested and raped by Feifel for some months until he threatened to say something in confessional. Feifel then ignores him and moves on to another boy.

Hoffman is also physically abused by his alcoholic father.

Many years later, now married with two children, Hoffman confronts his father. There is a reconciliation and he brings his own children to visit.

At the age of 68, Feifel was arrested, convicted, and imprisoned largely as the result of the publication of Hoffman's memoir. He had been arrested twice before for sexually assaulting young boys but had never been sent to jail. In 1995, a number of boys agreed to testify, and Hoffman spoke to one of them 11-year-old Michael, to thank him and give him confidence. Michael shared with Hoffman before they hung up on their phone call, "Thanks for, you know, writing that book. You made 'it' stop." It. Hoffman has said that "it has been determined that he violated upwards of 400 boys during his nearly four decades of coaching".

== Reception ==
Kirkus Reviews largely praised the book, describing it as "wonderfully written and heart-wrenchingly sad", though criticized the part in which the author confronts his father. In a short review for the Los Angeles Times, Charles Solomon described it as "darkly powerful".
