= Young, Gifted and Black (disambiguation) =

(To Be) Young, Gifted and Black may refer to:

- To Be Young, Gifted and Black (play), 1968, based on the collated autobiographical writings of Lorraine Hansberry
- To Be Young, Gifted and Black: Lorraine Hansberry in Her Own Words (1969), posthumous autobiography of Lorraine Hansberry (1930–1965)
- To Be Young, Gifted and Black, a 1972 made-for-television movie directed by Michael Schultz, based on the play about Lorraine Hansberry

== Music ==
- "To Be Young, Gifted and Black", 1969 song by Nina Simone with lyrics by Weldon Irvine in memory of Lorraine Hansberry
- Young, Gifted and Black (Bob Andy and Marcia Griffiths album), 1970 album by Bob and Marcia
- Young, Gifted and Black, 1972 album by Aretha Franklin
- "YGM (Young, Gifted and Mixed)", song by group Atmosphere on the 2007 mixtape Strictly Leakage
