= Patricia J. Gibson =

American playwright (1952–2022)

- Born: 1952; Pittsburgh, Pennsylvania
- Died: October 20, 2022 (aged 69); New York, New York
- Other name: P.J. Gibson
- Education: Keuka College, Brandeis University
- Occupations: Playwright, teacher, and lecturer
- Awards: National Endowment of the Arts playwriting grant

Patricia Joann Gibson (1952–2022) was an American playwright and teacher.

== Biography ==
Patricia Joann Gibson was born in Pittsburgh, Pennsylvania, in 1952. She grew up in Trenton, New Jersey. She started writing at the age of 9.

She earned a BA in drama, religion, and English from Keuka College. She earned a MFA from Brandeis University in 1975, where she received a Schubert Fellowship.

Gibson studied under J.P. Miller. Other mentors included Don Peterson and Israel Horovitz. Lorraine Hansberry was a major influence on Gibson's work. Gibson saw To Be Young Gifted and Black in 1969, and started writing plays.

=== Works ===
She has written 35 full-length plays and television scripts for Oprah Winfrey and Bill Cosby.

Her play Miss Ann Don't Cry No More (1980) earned a National Endowment of the Arts grant. The play was performed as a reading at the Frank Silvera Writer's Workshop, and eventually fully produced at the Frederick Douglass Creative Arts Center.

Her play Long Time Since Yesterday earned multiple AUDELCO awards in 1985, including Best Play. It has had over 60 productions since its premiere.

Gibson was playwright-in-residence at Rutgers University, the University of California at Berkeley, and a lengthy stay at the College of New Rochelle Gibson was an Artistic Director of the Rites and Reason Theatre at Brown University.

Gibson taught as an assistant professor of English at John Jay College of Criminal Justice City University of New York. She started on April 19, 1988 in the Seek Department, and in 1990 moved to the English department.

She was part of the Woodie King Jr.'s New Federal Theatre playwriting faculty.

== Death ==
Gibson died on May 6, 2022.

John Jay College established a P.J. Gibson Memorial Scholarship for Creative Writers in her name.

== Published works ==
=== Plays ===
- Shameful in Your Eyes (1971)
- The Black Woman (1971, as a one-act play; 1972, as a three-act play)
- companion one-act plays Void Passage and Konvergence (1973)
- The Ninth Story Window (1974)
- Spida Bug (1975)
- The Zappers and the Shopping Bag Lady (1979)
- The Androgyny (1979)
- Ain't Love Grand? (1980)
- Miss Ann Don't Cry No More (1980)
- Brown Silk and Magenta Sunsets (1981)
- My Mark, My Name (1981)
- Angel (1981)
- The Unveiling of Abigail (1982)
- Clean Sheets Can't Soil (1983)
- Long Time Since Yesterday (1985/1992)
- Deep Roots (1998)
- trilogy Private Hells, Sketches in Reality (1981), which included You Must Die Before My Eyes as I Have Before Yours, “But I Feed the Pigeons” / “Well, I Watch the Sun,” and Can You Tell Me Who They Is?

=== Book Anthology ===
- Destiny's Daughters: 9 Voices of P.J. Gibson

=== Unproduced works ===
- Strippa
- Swing/Slide
- Majorna and the Man Thief
- A Man
- Masculine and Glass Fist
- Marie
- In Search of Me (also titled Trial)

== Recognition ==
- AUDELCO awards, Audience Development Committee
- Shubert Fellowship
- National Endowment of the Arts playwriting grant
- PSC-CUNY research award grant
- Artist in Residence at the University of Michigan, Ann Arbor
- Schubert fellowship with which she earned her M.F.A. at Brandeis University
- Bushfire Theatre of Performing Arts Seventh Annual "Walk of Fame"
- proclamation from the city of Trenton, New Jersey and Key to the City from Indianapolis, Indiana
