= Lorraine Hansberry: Sighted Eyes/Feeling Heart =

- Directed by: Tracy Heather Strain
- Produced by: Tracy Heather Strain, Randall MacLowry
- Narrated by: LaTanya Richardson Jackson
- Edited by: Randall MacLowry
- Music by: Don Byron
- Production company: The Film Posse
- Distributed by: California Newsreel
- Release date: September 2017
- Running time: 117
- Country: United States of America
- Language: English

Lorraine Hansberry: Sighted Eyes/Feeling Heart is a 2017 American documentary film by Tracy Heather Strain (Producer, Director, Writer), Randall MacLowry (Producer, Editor) and Chiz Schultz (Executive Producer) on the life and work of writer Lorraine Hansberry. Hansberry is best known as the playwright of A Raisin in the Sun, a story that partially mirrored experiences of her family in confronting racial segregation. It premiered in 1959, won the New York Drama Critics Circle Award for Best Play and was the first play by a Black woman to be produced on Broadway.

The film's world premiere was at the Toronto International Film Festival in September 2017 and its national U.S. broadcast premiere was on January 19, 2018, in the American Masters series on PBS.

Lorraine Hansberry: Sighted Eyes/Feeling Heart presents various aspects of A Raisin in the Sun, including the challenge of securing investment and a venue for its initial production, the casting process, artistic debates and finally its public reception. The film features interviews with the play's original cast members, Sidney Poitier, Ruby Dee, Louis Gossett Jr., and Glynn Turman, director Lloyd Richards, producer Phil Rose, supporter Harry Belafonte as well as writer Amiri Baraka. The documentary also includes excerpts from the 1961 Hollywood movie version.

Beyond A Raisin in the Sun, the film examines details of Hansberry's life as a left wing activist. Like her writing, the documentary draws attention to some of the critical issues of the mid-Twentieth Century and beyond (racial justice, colonialism, feminism, class divisions, sexuality) and addresses the role of artists and intellectuals. The film reveals Hansberry as a feminist and acknowledges her lesbian identity.

== Production ==
As a teenager, director Tracy Heather Strain first found out about Lorraine Hansberry when her grandmother took her to a performance in Harrisburg, PA of the play To Be Young, Gifted and Black which was based on Hansberry's writings. Strain was inspired to make this documentary which took fourteen years to complete. The filmmakers combed archives worldwide and had unprecedented access to Hansberry's personal papers, archives, home movies and photos in order to present her complex life.

== Reception ==
The film generally received positive press. Kelinda Graves in Black Film wrote “the Hansberry documentary is chic… très chic. It is glossy and gutsy in the same way that Hansberry was.” Dwight Brown in The Huffington Post said “All facets of Lorraine Hansberry’ public life, private romances and early death are on view in this beguiling, illuminating and perfectly assembled documentary.”

The film is the recipient of the 2018 Peabody Award, the American Historical Association’s 2018 John E. O’Connor Film Award, the 2018 NAACP Image Award for Outstanding Directing in a Motion Picture (Television) and the American Library Association’s 2019 Notable Videos for Adults Award.
