= Lorraine Hansberry =

African-American playwright and author (1930–1965)

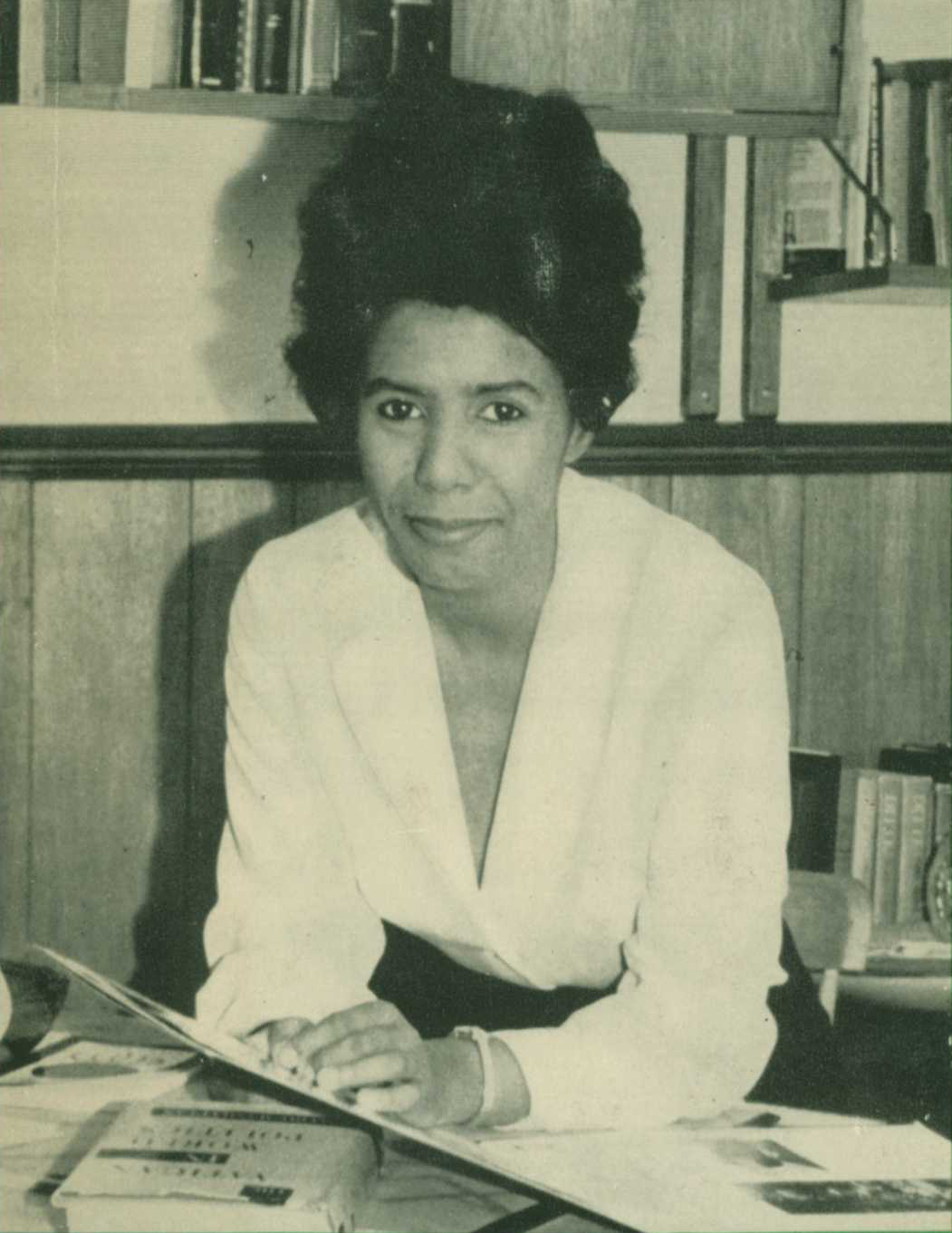
- Hansberry c. 1965
- Born: Lorraine Vivian Hansberry; May 19, 1930; Chicago, Illinois, U.S.
- Died: January 12, 1965 (aged 34); New York City, New York, U.S.
- Education: University of Wisconsin–Madison; The New School
- Occupations: Playwright, writer, stage director
- Notable work: A Raisin in the Sun
- Spouse: Robert B. Nemiroff (m. 1953; div. 1962)
- Father: Carl Augustus Hansberry
- Relatives: Shauneille Perry (first cousin); William Leo Hansberry (uncle)

Lorraine Vivian Hansberry (May 19, 1930 – January 12, 1965) was an American playwright and civil rights activist. She was the first Black American female author to have a play performed on Broadway.

Hansberry's best-known work, the play A Raisin in the Sun, highlights the lives of Black Americans in Chicago living under racial segregation. The title of the play was taken from the poem "Harlem" by Langston Hughes. At the age of 29, Hansberry won the New York Drama Critics' Circle Award, making her the first Black American dramatist, the fifth woman, and the youngest playwright to do so. Her family challenged a restrictive covenant in the 1940 U.S. Supreme Court case Hansberry v. Lee.

After moving to New York City, Hansberry worked at the Pan-Africanist newspaper Freedom, where she worked with other Black intellectuals such as Paul Robeson and W. E. B. Du Bois. Much of Hansberry's work during this time concerned the decolonization of Africa and its impact on the world. She also wrote about the oppression of women and gay people. Hansberry died in 1965 of pancreatic cancer at the age of 34, two days after the end of the Broadway run of her play The Sign in Sidney Brustein's Window. A line from one of Hansberry's speeches inspired the Nina Simone song "To Be Young, Gifted and Black".

== Early life and family ==
Lorraine Hansberry was the youngest of four children born to Nannie Louise (née, Perry), a schoolteacher and ward committeeperson, and Carl Augustus Hansberry, a real estate broker. In 1938, her father bought a house in the Washington Park Subdivision of the South Side of Chicago, angering some of the white neighbors. The latter's legal efforts to force the Hansberry family out culminated in the U.S. Supreme Court decision in Hansberry v. Lee, 311 U.S. 32 (1940). The restrictive covenant was ruled contestable, although not inherently invalid; the enforcement of such covenants were eventually ruled unconstitutional in Shelley v. Kraemer, 334 U.S. 1 (1948).

Carl Hansberry was also a supporter of the Urban League and NAACP in Chicago. Both Hansberrys were active in the Chicago Republican Party. Carl died in 1946 when Lorraine was 15 years old. The Hansberrys were routinely visited by prominent Black people, including W. E. B. Du Bois, Langston Hughes, Paul Robeson, Duke Ellington, and Jesse Owens.

Carl Hansberry's brother, William Leo Hansberry, founded the African Civilization section of the History Department at Howard University. Director and playwright Shauneille Perry is her first cousin, and Perry's eldest child is named after her. Hansberry's grandniece is the actor Taye Hansberry. Her cousin is musician Aldridge Hansberry. Hansberry was the godmother to Nina Simone's daughter Lisa.

== Education and political involvement ==
Hansberry is a 1944 graduate from Betsy Ross Elementary and a 1948 graduate from Englewood High School. She attended the University of Wisconsin–Madison, where she became politically active with the Communist Party USA and integrated a dormitory. Hansberry's classmate Bob Teague remembered her as "the only girl I knew who could whip together a fresh picket sign with her own hands, at a moment's notice, for any cause or occasion."

Hansberry worked on Henry A. Wallace's Progressive Party presidential campaign in 1948, despite her mother's disapproval. Hansberry spent the summer of 1949 in Mexico, studying painting at the University of Guadalajara.

== Move to New York ==
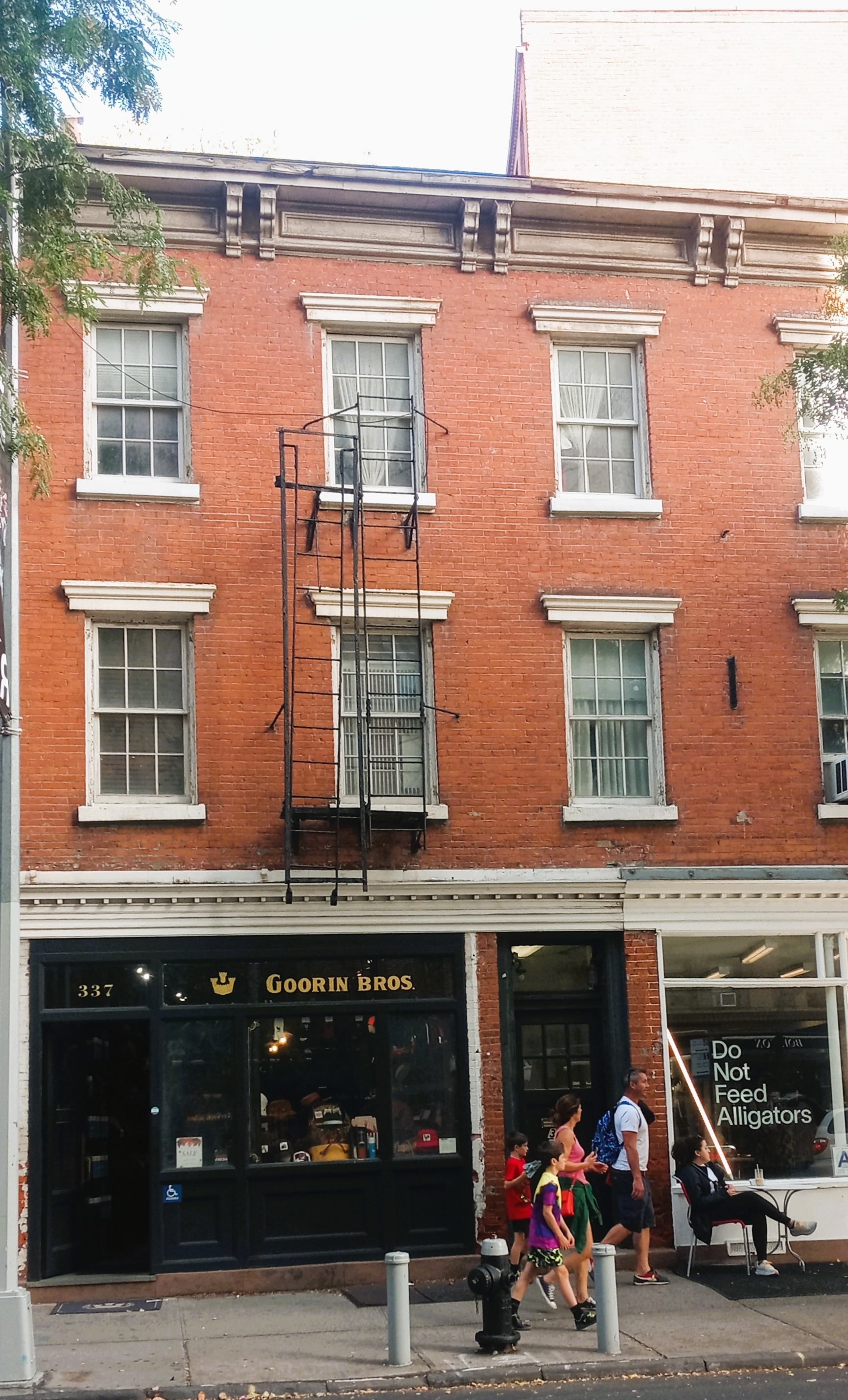
From 1953 to 1960, Hansberry resided in the third-floor apartment of 335–337 Bleecker Street.

In 1950, Hansberry decided to leave Madison in order to pursue her career as a writer in New York City, where she attended The New School. Hansberry moved to Harlem in 1951, and she became involved in activist struggles such as the fight against evictions.

=== Freedom newspaper and activism ===
In 1951, Hansberry joined the staff of the black newspaper Freedom that was edited by Louis E. Burnham and published by Paul Robeson. At Freedom, she worked with W. E. B. Du Bois and other Black Pan-Africanists. Hansberry wrote news articles and editorials and worked as a "subscription clerk, receptionist, typist, and editorial assistant."

Hansberry also wrote scripts at Freedom. To celebrate the newspaper's first anniversary, she wrote the script for a rally at Rockland Palace, a then-famous Harlem hall, on the history of Black newspapers in America in the struggle for freedom from 1827 on. Performers in this pageant included Paul Robeson, Lawrence Brown, Asadata Dafora, and numerous others. The following year, Hansberry collaborated on a pageant for the newspaper's Negro History Festival with the playwright Alice Childress, another author for the newspaper, as well as with Harry Belafonte, Sidney Poitier, Douglas Turner Ward, and John Oliver Killens. This is her earliest surviving theatrical work.

Hansberry understood the struggle against white supremacy to be interlinked with the program of the Communist Party. One of her first reports covered the Sojourners for Truth and Justice's convening in Washington, D.C., led by Mary Church Terrell. Hansberry traveled to Georgia to cover the case of Willie McGee and she was inspired to write the poem "Lynchsong" about his case.

Hansberry also worked on global struggles against colonialism and imperialism. She wrote in support of the Mau Mau uprising in Kenya, criticizing the mainstream press for its biased coverage. Hansberry often focused on the female participants in these struggles. She was particularly interested in the rights of Muslim women in Egypt.

In 1952, Hansberry attended a peace conference in Montevideo, Uruguay, in place of Robeson, who had been denied travel rights by the United States Department of State.

=== Marriage and personal life ===
On June 20, 1953, Hansberry married Robert Nemiroff, a publisher, songwriter, and political activist. They moved to Greenwich Village, which would become the setting of her second Broadway play, The Sign in Sidney Brustein's Window. On the night before their wedding, Nemiroff and Hansberry protested against the execution of Julius and Ethel Rosenberg in New York City.

The financial success of the pop song "Cindy, Oh Cindy", co-authored by Nemiroff, enabled Hansberry to start writing full-time. Although the couple separated in 1957 and divorced in the early 1960s, their personal and professional relationship lasted until Hansberry's death, they held property together, and he was the executor in charge of her works.

Hansberry wrote about lesbian inclinations. Before her marriage, Hansberry had written in her personal notebooks about her attraction to women. In 1957, around the time Hansberry separated from Nemiroff, she contacted the Daughters of Bilitis, the San Francisco-based lesbian rights organization, contributing two letters to their magazine, The Ladder, both of which were published only under her initials, first "L.H.N." and later "L.N." Pointing to these two letters as evidence, some writers credit Hansberry as having been an activist for gay rights, however, according to her biographer, Kevin J. Mumford, beyond reading homophile magazines and corresponding with their creators, "no evidence has surfaced" to support claims that Hansberry was directly involved in the movement for gay and lesbian civil equality.

Mumford states that Hansberry's lesbian inclinations left her feeling isolated while A Raisin in the Sun catapulted her to fame. He speculates that while "her impulse to cover evidence of her lesbian desires sprang from other anxieties of respectability and conventions of marriage, Hansberry was well on her way to coming out." Near the end of her life, Hansberry declared herself "committed [to] this homosexuality thing" and vowed to "create my life – not just accept it". Before her death, Hansberry built a circle of gay and lesbian friends, took several lovers, vacationed in Provincetown, and subscribed to several homophile magazines.

Atheistic themes were expressed openly by Hansberry within her dramas, particularly A Raisin in the Sun. Critics and historians have contextualized the humanist themes of her work within a broader history of Black atheist literature and a wider English-language humanist tradition.

Upon Hansberry's death in 1965, Robert Nemiroff donated all of her personal and professional effects to the New York Public Library. He was the appointed executor for her works left unfinished. Nemiroff curated them, sometimes completed them, and had them performed and published. He blocked access to all of her materials related to lesbianism from access by scholars or biographers. In 2013, Nemiroff's daughter, Joi Gresham, released the restricted materials to Kevin J. Mumford, who explored that aspect of her life in his work.

== Success as playwright ==
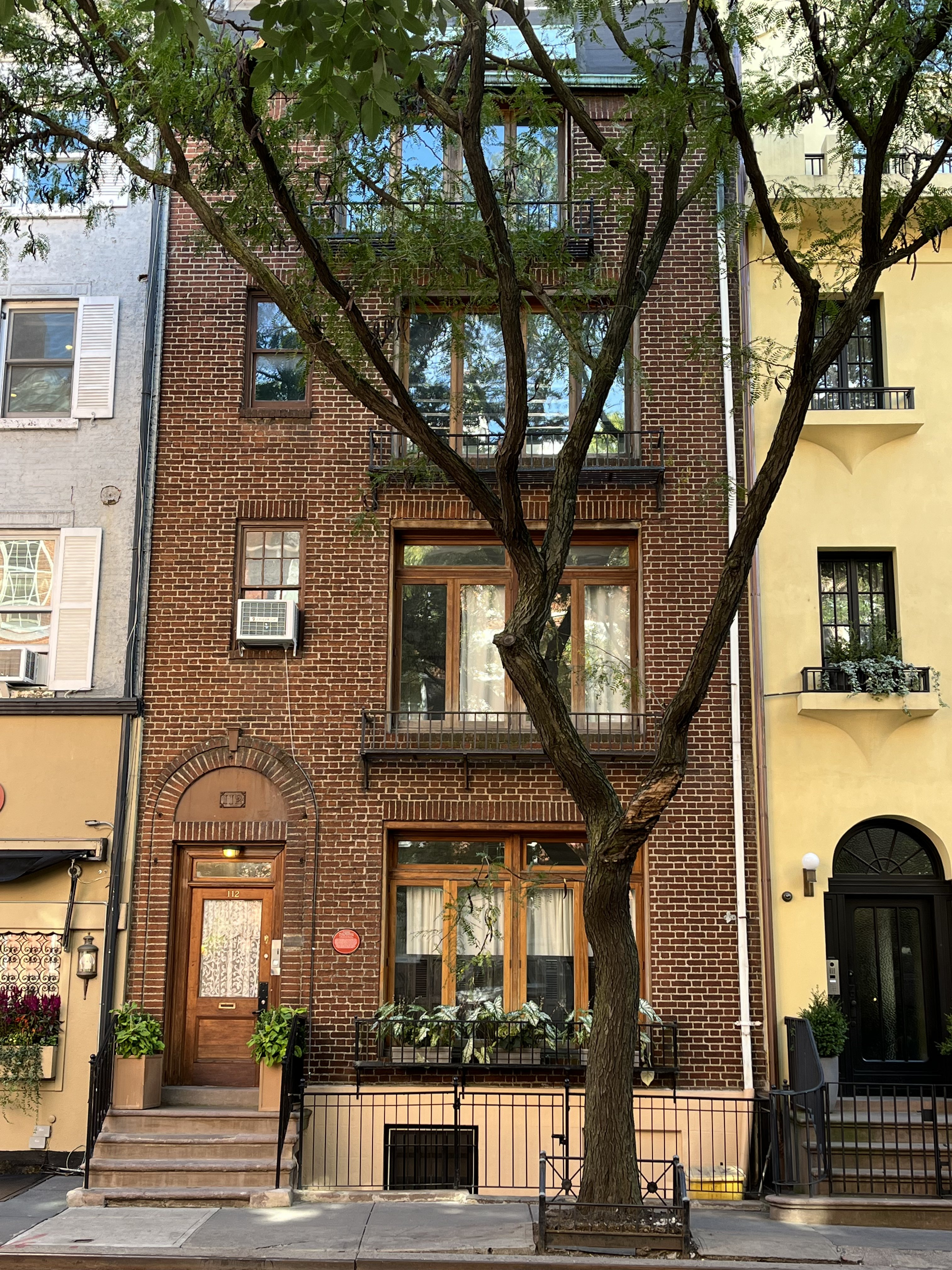
Hansberry lived in Greenwich Village, 112 Waverly Place, from 1960 until 1965

Written and completed in 1957, A Raisin in the Sun opened at the Ethel Barrymore Theatre on March 11, 1959, becoming the first play by an African-American woman to be produced on Broadway. The 29-year-old author became the youngest American playwright and the fifth woman to receive the New York Drama Critics Circle Award for Best Play. Hansberry was also nominated for the Tony Award for Best Play, among the four Tony Awards that the play was nominated for in 1960. Over the next two years, A Raisin in the Sun was translated into 35 languages and was performed all around the world.

In April 1959, photographer David Attie did a photoshoot of Hansberry for Vogue magazine, in the apartment at 337 Bleecker Street where she had written A Raisin in the Sun. That shoot produced many of the best-known images of her today. In her biography Looking for Lorraine: The Radiant and Radical Life of Lorraine Hansberry, Imani Perry writes that in his images, "Attie captured her intellectual confidence, armour, and remarkable beauty."

In 1960, during Delta Sigma Theta's 26th national convention in Chicago, Hansberry was made an honorary member.

Hansberry's screenplay of A Raisin in the Sun was produced by Columbia Pictures and released in 1961. The film starred Sidney Poitier and Ruby Dee, and it was directed by Daniel Petrie.

In 1961, Hansberry replaced Vinnette Carroll as the director of the musical Kicks and Co, after its try-out at Chicago's McCormick Place. A satire involving miscegenation, the show was co-produced by Hansberry's husband, Robert Nemiroff. Despite a warm reception in Chicago, the show never made it to Broadway.

In 1962, Lorraine Hansberry and Robert Nemiroff bought a house on Quaker Bridge Road, across the Croton River from Croton-on-Hudson, New York. Hansberry put up a sign calling the house "Chitterling Heights".

On May 24, 1963, Hansberry participated in a meeting with Attorney General Robert F. Kennedy that had been set up by James Baldwin.

Hansberry agreed to speak to the winners of the Reader's Digest/UNCF creative writing contest on May 1, 1964. The speech was entitled, "To Be Young, Gifted, and Black".

On June 16, 1963, Hansberry chaired a Rally to Support the Southern Freedom Movement at Temple Israel in Croton-on-Hudson to raise funds for civil rights organizations, particularly ones focusing on voting rights in the Southern United States. Hansberry introduced the key speaker, Jerome Smith (an organizer for the Congress of Racial Equality who had also participated in the Baldwin–Kennedy meeting), to the "predominantly white crowd" of 1,000. Some of the $5,000 raised went to purchase the used station wagon that Andrew Goodman, Michael Schwerner and James Chaney were driving the following summer when they were murdered.

That same year, she was diagnosed with pancreatic cancer. Hansberry underwent two operations, on June 24 and August 2, but neither of the surgeries succeeded in curing the cancer.

While many of her other writings were published in her lifetime – essays, articles, and the Student Nonviolent Coordinating Committee book The Movement: Documentary of a Struggle for Equality – the only other play by Hansberry given a contemporary production was The Sign in Sidney Brustein's Window. It ran for 101 performances on Broadway and closed the night she died.

== Beliefs ==
According to historian Fanon Che Wilkins, "Hansberry believed that gaining civil rights in the United States and obtaining independence in colonial Africa were two sides of the same coin that presented similar challenges for Africans on both sides of the Atlantic." In response to the independence of Ghana, Hansberry wrote: "The promise of the future of Ghana is that of all the colored peoples of the world; it is the promise of freedom."

Regarding tactics, Hansberry said that Black people "must concern themselves with every single means of struggle: legal, illegal, passive, active, violent, and non-violent [...] They must harass, debate, petition, give money to court struggles, sit-in, lie-down, strike, boycott, sing hymns, pray on steps – and shoot from their windows when the racists come cruising through their communities."

James Baldwin described Hansberry's 1963 meeting with Robert F. Kennedy, in which Hansberry asked for a "moral commitment" on civil rights from Kennedy. According to Baldwin, Hansberry stated: "I am not worried about black men – who have done splendidly, it seems to me, all things considered [...] But I am very worried [...] about the state of the civilization which produced that photograph of the white cop standing on that Negro woman's neck in Birmingham."

In a town hall debate on June 15, 1964, Hansberry criticized white liberals who could not accept civil disobedience, expressing a need to "encourage the white liberal to stop being a liberal and become an American radical." At the same time, she said, "some of the first people who have died so far in this struggle have been white men."

Hansberry was a critic of existentialism, which she considered too distant from the historical material conditions of the world. She wrote a critical review of Richard Wright's The Outsider and wrote her final play Les Blancs as a foil to Jean Genet's absurdist Les Nègres. However, Hansberry admired Simone de Beauvoir's existentialist feminist book The Second Sex.

In 1959, Hansberry commented that women who are "twice oppressed" may become "twice militant". She held out some hope for male allies of women, writing in an unpublished essay: "If by some miracle women should not ever utter a single protest against their condition there would still exist among men those who could not endure in peace until her liberation had been achieved."

Hansberry was appalled by the atomic bombings of Hiroshima and Nagasaki, which took place while she was in high school. She expressed a desire for a future in which "we get rid of all the little bombs – and the big bombs," although she also believed in the right of people to defend themselves with force against their oppressors.

The FBI began surveillance of Hansberry when she prepared to go to the Montevideo peace conference. Staff members of its Washington, D.C., office searched her passport files "in an effort to obtain all available background material on the subject, any derogatory information contained therein, and a photograph and complete description," while officers in Milwaukee and Chicago examined her life history. Later, an FBI reviewer of A Raisin in the Sun highlighted its Pan-Africanist themes as "dangerous".

== Death ==
On January 12, 1965, Hansberry died of pancreatic cancer, aged 34. In his introduction to Hansberry's posthumously-released autobiography, To Be Young, Gifted, and Black: An Informal Autobiography, James Baldwin wrote that "it is not at all farfetched to suspect that what she saw contributed to the strain which killed her."

Hansberry's funeral was held in Harlem on January 15, 1965. Paul Robeson and SNCC organizer James Forman gave eulogies. The presiding minister, Eugene Callender, recited a message from James Baldwin, as well as a message from Martin Luther King Jr. that read: "Her creative ability and her profound grasp of the deep social issues confronting the world today will remain an inspiration to generations yet unborn." Hansberry is buried at Asbury United Methodist Church Cemetery in Croton-on-Hudson, New York.

== Posthumous publications ==
Hansberry left behind an unfinished novel and several other plays, including The Drinking Gourd and What Use Are Flowers?, with a range of content, from slavery to a post-apocalyptic future.

Hansberry's former husband, Robert Nemiroff, became the executor for several unfinished manuscripts. He added minor changes to complete the play Les Blancs, which Julius Lester termed her best work. Nemiroff adapted many of her writings into the play To Be Young, Gifted and Black, which was the longest-running off-Broadway play of the 1968–69 season. The play appeared in book form the following year under the title To Be Young, Gifted, and Black: Lorraine Hansberry in Her Own Words.

Nemiroff donated Hansberry's personal and professional effects to the New York Public Library. Scholar Kevin J. Mumford asserts that Nemiroff "separated out the lesbian-themed correspondence, diaries, unpublished manuscripts, and full runs of the homophile magazines and restricted them from access to researchers." In 2013, more than 20 years after Nemiroff's death, a new executor released the restricted material that Mumford used.

== Legacy ==
In 1973, a musical based on A Raisin in the Sun, entitled Raisin, opened on Broadway, with music by Judd Woldin, lyrics by Robert Brittan, and a book by Nemiroff and Charlotte Zaltzberg. The show ran for more than two years and won two Tony Awards, including Best Musical.

In 2004, A Raisin in the Sun was revived on Broadway in a production starring Sean "P. Diddy" Combs, Phylicia Rashad, and Audra McDonald, and directed by Kenny Leon. The production won Tony Awards for Best Actress in a Play for Rashad and Best Featured Actress in a Play for McDonald, and received a nomination for Best Revival of a Play.

In 2008, the production was adapted for television with the same cast, winning the NAACP Image Award for Outstanding Television Movie, Mini-Series or Dramatic Special.

In 2014, the play was revived on Broadway again in a production starring Denzel Washington, directed again by Kenny Leon. It won three Tony Awards, for Best Revival of a Play, Best Featured Actress in a Play for Sophie Okonedo, and Best Direction of a Play.

In 1969, Nina Simone released a song about Hansberry entitled "To Be Young, Gifted and Black". The title of the song refers to Hansberry's speech to the winners of a creative writing conference on May 1, 1964. Simone wrote the song with the poet Weldon Irvine and told him that she wanted lyrics that would "make black children all over the world feel good about themselves forever." A studio recording by Simone was released as a single and the first live recording on October 26, 1969, was captured on Black Gold (1970). The single reached the top ten of the Hot R&B/Hip-Hop Songs chart. In the introduction of the live version, Simone talks about the difficulty of losing a close friend and talented artist in Hansberry.

Patricia and Fredrick McKissack wrote a biography of Hansberry for children, entitled Young, Black, and Determined, in 1998. The following year, Hansberry was posthumously inducted into the Chicago Gay and Lesbian Hall of Fame. In 2002, scholar Molefi Kete Asante listed Hansberry in the biographical dictionary 100 Greatest African Americans.

The Lorraine Hansberry Theatre in San Francisco is named in her honor. It specializes in original stagings and revivals of African-American theater.

The first-year dormitory for women at Lincoln University is named Lorraine Hansberry Hall. A school in the Bronx is entitled Lorraine Hansberry Academy and an elementary school in St. Albans, Queens, is named after Hansberry as well. Lorraine Hansberry Elementary School was located in the Ninth Ward of New Orleans. Heavily damaged by Hurricane Katrina in 2005, it has since closed.

In 2010, on the eightieth anniversary of Hansberry's birth, Adjoa Andoh presented a BBC Radio 4 program entitled Young, Gifted and Black in tribute to her life.

Founded in 2004 and officially launched in 2006, The Hansberry Project was created as an African-American theater lab led by African-American artists in Seattle. A Contemporary Theatre (ACT) was their first incubator and, in 2012 they became an independent organization.

In 2010, Hansberry was inducted into the Chicago Literary Hall of Fame.

In 2013, Hansberry was inducted into the Legacy Walk, an outdoor public display that celebrates LGBT history and people. This made her the first Chicago native to be honored along the North Halsted corridor. That same year, Hansberry was inducted into the American Theatre Hall of Fame.

In 2017, Hansberry was inducted into the National Women's Hall of Fame.

In January 2018, the PBS series American Masters released a documentary, Lorraine Hansberry: Sighted Eyes/Feeling Heart, directed by Tracy Heather Strain.

On September 18, 2018, the biography Looking for Lorraine: The Radiant and Radical Life of Lorraine Hansberry, written by scholar Imani Perry, was published by Beacon Press.

Through the efforts of the NYC LGBT Historic Sites Project, Hansberry's apartment on Bleecker Street was listed on the New York State Register of Historic Places and the National Register of Historic Places in 2021.

The Lorraine Hansberry Coalition of Croton (LHC), a volunteer group, was established in 2021 to celebrate the life and works of Lorraine Hansberry and to build on her legacy through free public programs.

On June 9, 2022, the Lilly Awards Foundation unveiled a statue of Hansberry in Times Square. The statue was sent on a tour of major U.S. cities. On August 23, 2024, it was unveiled at its permanent home on Chicago's Navy Pier with a special ceremony, including an outdoor screening of the 1961 movie, A Raisin in the Sun. The sculpture, by Alison Saar, is entitled "To Sit A While" and features Hansberry surrounded by five life-sized bronze chairs representing different aspects of her life and work. The title is a quote from Hansberry.

In March 2026, through LHC advocacy, Lorraine Hansberry was posthumously awarded the 2026 Trailblazers Award by Westchester County, New York, and the village of Croton-on-Hudson renamed a section of a Croton street running past her grave and the Croton Free Library as Lorraine Hansberry Way.

== Works ==
=== Plays ===
- A Raisin in the Sun (1959)
- The Drinking Gourd (1960)
- What Use Are Flowers? (1962)
- The Sign in Sidney Brustein's Window (1965)
- To Be Young, Gifted and Black: Lorraine Hansberry in Her Own Words (adapted by Robert Nemiroff, 1969)
- Les Blancs (compiled and edited by Robert Nemiroff, 1994)
- The Arrival of Mr. Todog (unpublished)
- Toussaint (unfinished)

=== Other writing ===
- "On Summer" (essay, 1960)
- A Raisin in the Sun (screenplay, 1961)
- The Movement: Documentary of a Struggle for Equality (book, 1964)

== See also ==
- African-American literature
- Clybourne Park – inspired by A Raisin in the Sun
- Feminist existentialism
