= Lorraine Hansberry Hall =

Coordinates: 39°48′25.6″N 75°55′43.1″W

Lorraine Hansberry Hall (built 1973) is a residence hall at Lincoln University, named for author and playwright Lorraine Hansberry. Since its opening, Lorraine Hansberry Hall has been used to house freshmen women. In January 2003 the Women’s Center was opened in the basement as a wellness resource directed for female students. The basement of Lorraine Hansberry Hall is also the location for the large laundry area for the residents.
