= Black Hands, White Sails =

1999 book by Patricia McKissack

Black Hands, White Sails: The Story of African-American Whalers
- Author: Patricia McKissack, Frederick McKissack
- Language: English
- Genre: Children's literature, US whaling history, African-American history
- Published: 1999 (Scholastic)
- Publication place: USA
- Media type: Print (hardback, paperback)
- Pages: 152
- ISBN: 9780590483131
- OCLC: 779095822

Black Hands, White Sails: The Story of African-American Whalers is a 1999 book by Patricia McKissack and Frederick McKissack about the involvement of African-Americans in the history of whaling in the United States.

== Reception ==
Booklist, in its review of Black Hands, White Sails, called it a "fascinating look at the convergent histories of whaling and the abolitionist movement" and concluded "Less-skilled readers may have difficulty following the expansive narrative that pulls in details from several different angles, but history buffs and researchers should find the book's complexity rewarding." and Library Journal found it "A well-researched and detailed book".

Black Hands, White Sails has also been reviewed by The ALAN Review, Kirkus Reviews, The Horn Book Magazine, and Voice of Youth Advocates.

== Awards ==
- 1997–1999 NCTE Books For You: An Annotated Booklist for Senior High
- 2000 Carter G. Woodson Book Award (Secondary level) – honor
- 2000 CCBC Choice
- 2000 Coretta Scott King Award author honor.
- 2000 Society of Midland Authors Children's Nonfiction Award - winner
