= Young, Black, and Determined =

Biography by Patricia and Fredrick McKissack

Young, Black, and Determined: A Biography of Lorraine Hansberry
- Authors: Patricia McKissack, Fredrick McKissack
- Language: English
- Subject: Children's non-fiction, Biography, African-American history, Civil rights, American theater
- Published: 1998 (Holiday House)
- Publication place: United States
- Media type: Print (hardback, paperback)
- Pages: 152
- ISBN: 9780823413003
- OCLC: 36292844

Young, Black, and Determined: A Biography of Lorraine Hansberry is a 1998 book by Patricia and Fredrick McKissack. It is a biography of the playwright and activist, Lorraine Hansberry.

== Reception ==
A review of Young, Black, and Determined by Booklist wrote "The McKissacks' biography sparkles with the energy and passion that characterize their subject. Readers can drink in the whole civil rights history of much of this century and an in-depth treatment of Hansberry's major play, along with her fascinating life, which cancer ended prematurely in 1965"; the School Library Journal called it a "well-written biography" and concluded "Whatever their purpose for using this volume, readers will find it lively and engaging."

Young, Black, and Determined has also been reviewed by Kirkus Reviews, The New York Times, and the Journal of Adolescent & Adult Literacy.

It is a 1998 CCBC Choices book.
