= Cosmic Vortex - Justice Divine =

Cosmic Vortex – Justice Divine

Studio album by Weldon Irvine
- Released: 1974
- Recorded: 1974 at RCA's Studio 'D', New York City, New York
- Genre: Jazz
- Length: 40:19
- Label: RCA
- Producer: Weldon Irvine

Weldon Irvine chronology
Time Capsule (1973)	Cosmic Vortex – Justice Divine (1974)	Spirit Man (1975)

Professional ratings
Review scores
Source	Rating
AllMusic	4/5 stars

Cosmic Vortex – Justice Divine is a 1974 album by jazz keyboardist Weldon Irvine, his first for RCA Records.

== Reception ==
The AllMusic review by Jason Ankeny awarded the album 4 stars stating:
After two visionary LPs for his own tiny Nodlew label, Weldon Irvine signed to RCA for Cosmic Vortex (Justice Divine), exploring the deeply spiritual and political terrain of his previous efforts on the kind of grand musical scale that major-label funding accommodates. This is a big, bold record by any measure, with a startlingly pronounced focus on lyrics and vocals. At the same time, however, the melodies spread out like tentacles, informed by the improvisational sensibilities of jazz and the deep-groove spirit of funk.

== Track listings ==
All songs written by Weldon Irvine.

1. "Love Your Brother" 5:15
2. "Walk That Walk; Talk That Talk" 7:50
3. "Love Jones" 4:11
4. "I'll Name It Tomorrow" 2:50
5. "Cosmic Vortex (Justice Divine)" 8:45
6. "Quiet (In Memory of Duke Ellington)" 5:06
7. "Let Yourself Be Free" 4:30
8. "Love Your Brother (Sanctified Version)" 1:30

== Personnel ==
- Weldon Irvine - keyboards, soprano saxophone, vocals
- Henry Grate, Jr., Cornell Dupree, Joe Caro - guitar
- Bob Cranshaw, Gordon Edwards, George Murray - bass
- Wesley "Gator" Watson, Jimmy Young, Lenny White, Chipper Lyles - drums
- Napoleon Revels - percussion
- Bud Johnson, Jr. - congas, bongos
- Gene Jefferson - tenor saxophone
- Jimmy Owens, Roy Roman, Everett "Blood" Hollins - trumpet
- Bill Barnwell - flute
- Nalo, Ojuleba - vocals

"With a special thanks to Tom Draper for his aid and support throughout."
