= Spirit Man =

Studio album by Weldon Irvine
- Released: 1975
- Recorded: 1975 at RCA's Studio 'D', New York City, New York
- Genre: Jazz
- Length: 37:49
- Label: RCA
- Producer: Weldon Irvine

Weldon Irvine chronology
Cosmic Vortex - Justice Divine (1974)	Spirit Man (1975)	Sinbad (1976)

Professional ratings
Review scores
Source	Rating
AllMusic	4/5 stars

Spirit Man is a 1975 album by jazz keyboardist, Weldon Irvine.

== Reception ==
The AllMusic review by Jason Ankeny awarded the album 4 stars stating:
Spirit Man channels the sonic sprawl of the preceding Cosmic Vortex (Justice Divine) to forge a tighter, more focused approach. Eschewing vocals altogether, it's Weldon Irvine's most balanced and complete recording, deftly combining massive funk grooves with ingenious electronic elements. Featuring a supporting cast including bassist Cleveland Freeman, trumpeters Charles Sullivan and Everett "Blood" Hollins, and saxophonist Sonny Fortune, Spirit Man parallels Herbie Hancock's groundbreaking fusion dates in both the imagination and ferocity of Irvine's keyboards as well as the extraterrestrial reach of its electronic effects. This music is deep, funky, and deeply funky.

== Track listings ==
All songs written by Weldon Irvine.

1. "We Gettin' Down" 5:50
2. "Softly" 0:37
3. "Pogo Stick" 6:45
4. "Blast Off" 4:17
5. "Jungle Juice" 8:10
6. "Yasmin" 4:37
7. "The Power and the Glory" 5:44
8. "Softly" 1:26

== Personnel ==
- Weldon Irvine - Conductor, Piano, Electric Piano, Clavinet, Synthesizer
- Cleveland Freeman - Electric Bass
- Wesley "Gator" Watson - Drums
- Henry Grate, Jr. - Guitar
- Bud Johnson, Jr. - Congas, Bongos
- Charles Sullivan, Everett "Blood" Hollins - Trumpet
- Sonny Fortune - Alto Saxophone
- Floyd Butler, Harry Elston - Background Vocals on "We Gettin' Down"
- Acy Lehman - art direction
- David B. Hecht - photography

== Samples & Covers ==
- A Tribe Called Quest sampled "We Gettin' Down" on their song, "Award Tour" on their album Midnight Marauders in 1993.
