= Rebels Against Slavery =

Book by Patricia McKissack

Rebels Against Slavery: American Slave Revolts
- Author: Patricia McKissack, Fredrick McKissack
- Language: English
- Subject: Children's literature, Slavery in the Americas
- Published: 1996 (Scholastic Press)
- Publication place: USA
- Media type: Print (hardback, paperback)
- Pages: 181
- ISBN: 9780590457354
- OCLC: 245948104

Rebels Against Slavery: American Slave Revolts is a 1996 book by Patricia and Fredrick McKissack.

It tells the life stories of a number of people involved in abolitionism in the Americas including Joseph Cinqué, Toussaint Louverture, Gabriel Prosser, Nat Turner, Harriet Tubman, Denmark Vesey, John Brown, Cato, and the Maroons.

== Reception ==
School Library Journal, when reviewing Rebels Against Slavery: American Slave Revolts, wrote "The authors' careful research, sensitivity, and evenhanded style reveal a sad, yet inspiring story of the will to be free." and concluded "A fine contribution to a growing body of literature about the African American experience." and Booklist wrote "The McKissacks present a fascinating cast: the men and women who led slave revolts in the Americas. .. The writing itself is informative, though occasionally garbled; sometimes it's hard to know to what a pronoun refers."

Rebels Against Slavery has also been reviewed by The Horn Book Magazine, Kirkus Reviews, Publishers Weekly, Orlando Sentinel, and Multicultural Review.

It has been recommended for teaching citizenship, and as a resource for elementary teachers.

== Awards ==
- 1996 CCBC Choice
- 1997 ALA Best Book for Young Adults
- 1997 Coretta Scott King Award author - honor
