= Sinbad (album) =

Studio album by Weldon Irvine
- Released: 1976
- Recorded: 1976 at RCA Studios, 'B' and 'E', New York City, New York
- Genre: Jazz
- Length: 40:29
- Label: RCA
- Producer: Weldon Irvine; Mike Lipskin

Weldon Irvine chronology
Spirit Man (1975)	Sinbad (1976)	The Sisters (1977)

Original Album Fold

Professional ratings
Review scores
Source	Rating
AllMusic	4/5 stars

Sinbad is a 1976 album by jazz keyboardist, Weldon Irvine.

== Reception ==
The AllMusic review by Jason Ankeny awarded the album 4 stars stating:
Recorded with an exemplary supporting cast featuring pianist Don Blackman, guitarist Eric Gale, and saxophonist Michael Brecker, Sinbad explores the extremes of Weldon Irvine's music, juxtaposing several of the keyboardist's funkiest, most energetic grooves to date alongside mellow, contemplative performances of uncommon intricacy and beauty. Inspired in both sound and spirit by the soul-searching Motown efforts of Marvin Gaye and Stevie Wonder, complete with covers of their respective "What's Going On" and "Don't You Worry 'Bout a Thing," Sinbad contrasts the elegant soul-jazz contours and luminous, horn-driven arrangements of the title cut and "Do Something for Yourself" alongside the nuances and soft pastels of "I Love You" and "Music Is the Key." The resiliency of Irvine's vision and the vibrant performances of his collaborators nevertheless create a kind of yin-yang dynamic that enables the album's divided soul to operate in harmony.

== Track listings ==
All songs written by Weldon Irvine; unless noted

1. "Sinbad" 6:21
2. "Don't You Worry 'Bout a Thing" - (Stevie Wonder) 5:51
3. "What's Goin' On?" - (Marvin Gaye) 4:38
4. "I Love You" - (Don Blackman) 3:03
5. "Do Something for Yourself" 4:45
6. "Music is the Key" - (Weldon Irvine, T. Smith) 7:36
7. "Here's Where I Came In" 3:36
8. "Gospel Feeling" 4:16

== Personnel ==
- Weldon Irvine - Keyboards, Synthesizer, Conductor
- Don Blackman - Acoustic Piano, Lead Vocals
- Cornell Dupree, Eric Gale - Guitar
- Chris Parker, Steve Gadd - Drums
- Gordon Edwards - Bass
- Richard Tee - Acoustic Piano
- Napoleon Revels-Bey - Percussion
- Michael Brecker - Tenor Saxophone
- Phil Bodner - Baritone Saxophone
- George Young - Alto Saxophone
- Randy Brecker - Trumpet
- Alan Raph - Bass Trombone
- Wayne Andre - Trombone
- Adrienne Albert, Bunny McCullough, Deborah McDuffie - Background Vocals
- Ted CoConis - artwork
