= Days of Jubilee =

Days Of Jubilee: The End of Slavery in the United States
- Author: Patricia McKissack, Fredrick McKissack
- Illustrator: Leo Dillon
- Language: English
- Genre: Children's literature, Biography, African history
- Published: 2002 (Scholastic)
- Publication place: USA
- Media type: Print (hardback, paperback)
- Pages: 134
- ISBN: 978-0-590-10764-8
- OCLC: 682327781

Days Of Jubilee: The End of Slavery in the United States is a 2002 book by Patricia McKissack and Fredrick McKissack which sets out the history of Abolitionism in the United States.

== Reception ==
Booklist, in its review of Days Of Jubilee, wrote "The balanced perspective, vivid telling, and well-chosen details give this book an immediacy that many history books lack. " and School Library Journal wrote "Readers familiar with Civil War history will be fascinated by the wealth of information on African Americans' contributions to the war effort, but those researching only the end of slavery may feel overwhelmed by tangential accounts of battles and military leaders." but then concluded "A useful resource for most collections."

The Horn Book Magazine was critical, calling it "unfocused and superficial" and found the extra information provided as boxed texts "more frequently .. merely distracting."

Days Of Jubilee has also been reviewed by Voice of Youth Advocates, Kirkus Reviews, Publishers Weekly, Mississippi Libraries, and Stone Soup.

It was awarded a 2004 Coretta Scott King Award author honor, and was a 2004 CCBC Choices book.
