= Weldon Irvine =

American composer, playwright, poet, and keyboardist

Weldon Jonathan Irvine Jr. (October 27, 1943 – April 9, 2002), also known as Master Wel, was an American composer, playwright, poet, pianist, organist, and keyboardist.

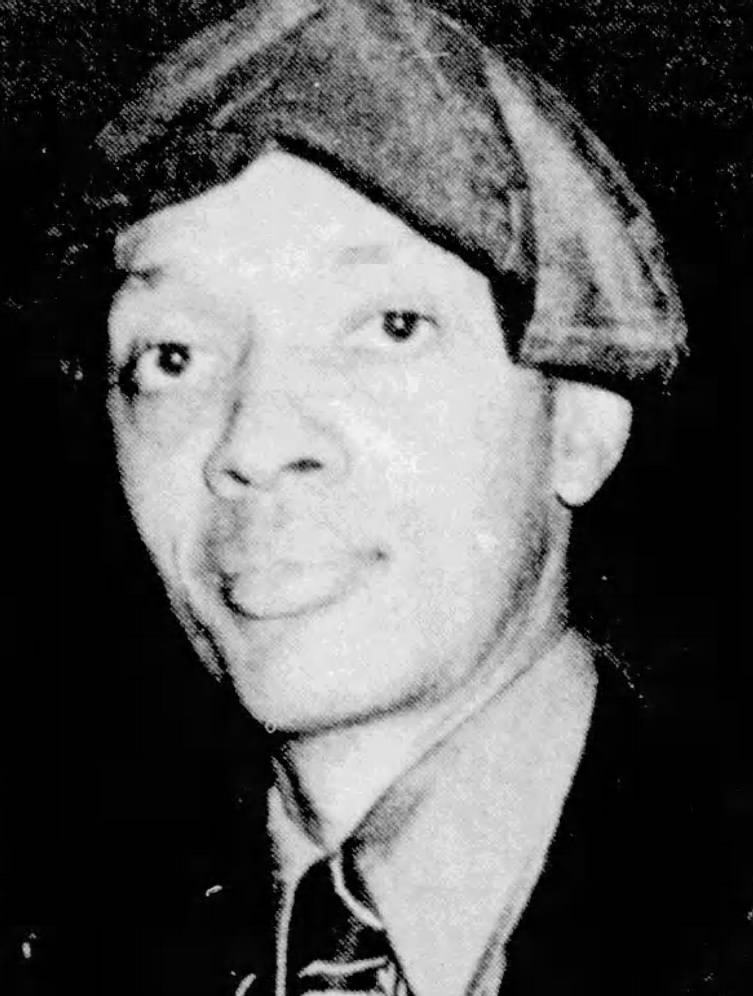
Irvine in 1977

== Biography ==
Irvine, an African American, was born in Hampton, Virginia, on October 27, 1943. He moved to New York City in 1965, settling in the St. Albans, Queens neighborhood. He was involved with various musical genres including jazz-funk, hip hop, jazz, funk, rhythm and blues, and gospel. He served as the bandleader for jazz singer Nina Simone and was a mentor to many New York hip-hop artists, including Q-Tip and Mos Def. He wrote more than 500 songs, including the lyrics for "To Be Young, Gifted and Black", performed live for the first time by Simone on the album Black Gold (1970). It has been dubbed the "official" Civil Rights anthem.

In 1998, he performed the keys for "Astronomy (8th Light)" on Black Star's album Mos Def & Talib Kweli Are Black Star. In 1999, Irvine contributed on Mos Def's debut solo album Black On Both Sides. Irvine's last major project was The Price of Freedom (1999), a compilation of original songs by hip-hop, jazz, funk, and R&B artists to respond to the shooting of Amadou Diallo. In 2000, Irvine provided the vocal introductions to tracks on the first CD of the album Late Night Blues by UK Drum & Bass producer Big Bud. He co-wrote and performed vocals and played the Fender Rhodes on the first track entitled "Return of Spiritman". He also played the Fender Rhodes on closing track "Persian Blues". He later performed vocals, Fender Rhodes and Hammond organ on the track "Amigo Mio" (also by Big Bud), which appeared on the compilation Earth Volume 5.

Irvine committed suicide by shooting himself outside of EAB Plaza and in front of the Nassau Coliseum located in Uniondale, New York, on April 9, 2002.

== Legacy ==
In 1976, Weldon's childhood friend Collis Davis produced a documentary The Edification of Weldon Irvine. It was originally Davis' Thesis Film during his time at NYU Film School.

In 2003, Madlib, Mr. Dibbs and Breakestra produced a tribute to Weldon Irvine, "Suite for Weldon". The following year, Madlib released the full-length album A Tribute to Brother Weldon.

In 2008, Q-Tip mentions Weldon in his song "Shaka", a tribute to the people who have helped him throughout the years and those who have died.

In 2019, a feature-length documentary, Digging for Weldon Irvine, was released by director Victorious De Costa.

In 2023, P-VINE acquired the catalog and associated copyrights owned by the estate of Weldon Irvine, for a worldwide territory, including works released from Nodlew Music, hitherto unreleased works, the copyright to "To Be Young, Gifted and Black", and other master recording rights and copyrights owned by the manager of the estate and Irvine’s widow Pauline Cole.

== Discography ==
=== As leader ===
- 1972: Liberated Brother (Nodlew Music)
- 1973: Time Capsule (Nodlew Music)
- 1974: Cosmic Vortex - Justice Divine (RCA)
- 1974: In Harmony (Strata-East)
- 1975: Spirit Man (RCA)
- 1976: Sinbad (RCA)
- 1989: Weldon & The Kats (Nodlew Music)
- 1994: Music is the Key (Luv N Haight)
- 1995: Keyboards Wild DJ's Smile (Tuff City)
- 1997: Embrace the Positive (Nodlew Music)
- 1998: The Sisters (Saucerman)
- 1999: The Amadou Project: The Price of Freedom (Nodlew Music)
- 2012: Young, Gifted and Broke (Shout! Productions)
- 2015: Live at Dean Street (Squatty Roo)

=== As sideman ===
With Richard Groove Holmes

- Comin' on Home (Blue Note, 1971)

With Freddie Hubbard

- Straight Life (CTI, 1971)

With Big Bud

- Late Night Blues (Good Looking Records, 2000)
- Earth Volume 5 (Track: "Amigo Mio") (Good Looking Records, 2001)

With Donald Blackman

- Listen (Expansion Records, 2002)

=== Charted singles ===
List of singles, with selected chart positions
Title	Year	Peak chart positions
Title	Year	AUS
"When I Was a Sperm"	1995	26
