= JP Miller =

American writer (1919–2001)

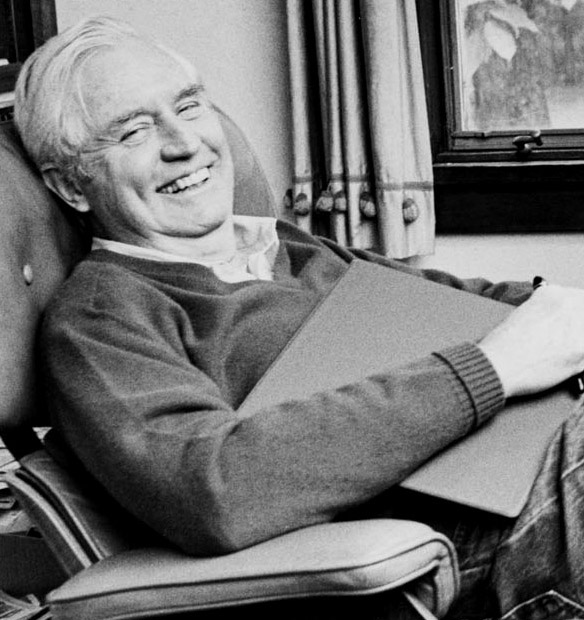
- Miller in his office, circa early 1980s
- Born: December 18, 1919; San Antonio, Texas, U.S.
- Died: November 1, 2001 (aged 81); Flemington, New Jersey, U.S.
- Occupation: Writer

James Pinckney Miller (December 18, 1919 – November 1, 2001) was an American writer whose pen name was "JP Miller". He was a leading playwright during the Golden Age of Television, receiving three Emmy nominations. A novelist and screenwriter, he was best known for Days of Wine and Roses, directed by John Frankenheimer for Playhouse 90 (1958) and later the 1962 film of the same name directed by Blake Edwards.

== Biography ==
Miller was the son of construction engineer Rolland James Miller and touring actress Rose Jetta Smith Miller. At the age of 17, living in Palacios, Texas, he sold his first story to Wild West Weekly. That same year, he boxed professionally in Beaumont, Texas, and other Texas rings under the name Tex Frontier, usually earning $10 a fight.

While attending Rice University in the late 1930s, he became a part-time reporter for the Houston Post. After graduating from Rice in 1941, he traveled to Mexico as a special feature writer but failed to send back any copy because he became interested in art and was studying sculpture at La Escuela de Artes Plasticas in Mexico City. Sick with jaundice, he returned to Texas, where he received a draft notice. He served in the Navy in the South Pacific, primarily as a gunnery officer, seeing combat first aboard the heavy cruiser USS Chester – torpedoed early in the war by a Japanese submarine. Aboard the aircraft carrier USS Cabot, he learned deep sea diving and adopted the name JP Miller (minus periods after the initials) after receiving orders in that format by U.S. Navy addressing machines. The Cabot returned to the United States with 13 battle stars, and a Presidential Unit Citation. Miller came back with a Purple Heart and Bronze Star. After World War II, he studied writing and acting at the Yale Drama School and then went to Houston, where he sold real estate and Coleman furnaces. Moving to New York, he sold York refrigerators and air conditioners while spending off hours at theaters, television studios and American Theater Wing classes.

== Television ==
Miller's first script for television was "The Polecat Shakedown", a 30-minute drama for Man Against Crime about a man who blackmailed restaurants by injecting a foul-smelling substance into eggs. When an egg was cracked, customers fled, and the villain demanded cash to prevent future incidents. When this drama was televised, Miller immediately quit his job as a salesman to write full-time. In 1954 he had five plays produced on live television.

Scripting during the early years of live television, his first notable success came February 13, 1955, with "The Rabbit Trap" on Goodyear Television Playhouse about a man who works in Long Island City at a construction firm where he is bullied by his boss. He takes his family to Vermont for a two-week vacation. TV Guide synopsized the drama: "While on vacation, a father and son set a rabbit trap. They are to return the next day to free the rabbit, a prospective pet for the boy. But the family is forced to return to the city after a rush call from the father's demanding boss." Back home, the boy points out that the rabbit will die in the trap. As Miller put it, "The guy finally realizes that the rabbit in the trap is him, and he takes his family and goes back to Vermont."

Miller's teleplays were staged on Kraft Television Theatre and The Philco Television Playhouse, followed by Producers' Showcase (1955), Playwrights '56 (1956) and Playhouse 90 (1958–59). He did his LSD drama, The People Next Door, for CBS Television Playhouse (1968).

However, Miller received the most acclaim for Days of Wine and Roses, which was prompted by his notion to dramatize Alcoholics Anonymous meetings (which were something of a mystery in the early 1950s). The drama was telecast October 2, 1958, on Playhouse 90. It became a movie four years later, but Miller preferred the earlier teleplay, commenting, "Of course, the television version was closer to my heart, because it was closer to my original image."

Presented live with tape inserts on CBS, the television production, starring Cliff Robertson, Piper Laurie, Charles Bickford and Malcolm Atterbury, was a powerful slice of life probe into the nature of alcoholism. In The New York Times, the day after Days of Wine and Roses was telecast, Jack Gould wrote a rave review with much praise for the writer, director and cast:

It was a brilliant and compelling work... Mr. Miller's dialogue was especially fine, natural, vivid and understated. Miss Laurie's performance was enough to make the flesh crawl, yet it also always elicited deep sympathy. Her interpretation of the young wife just a shade this side of delirium tremens—the flighty dancing around the room, her weakness of character and moments of anxiety and her charm when she was sober—was a superlative accomplishment. Miss Laurie is moving into the forefront of our most gifted young actresses. Mr. Robertson achieved first-rate contrast between the sober man fighting to hold on and the hopeless drunk whose only courage came from the bottle. His scene in the greenhouse, where he tried to find the bottle that he had hidden in the flower pot, was particularly good... John Frankenheimer's direction was magnificent. His every touch implemented the emotional suspense but he never let the proceedings get out of hand or merely become sensational.

Miller's Days of Wine and Roses received favorable critical attention and was nominated for an Emmy in the category "Best Writing of a Single Dramatic Program – One Hour or Longer." Playhouse 90 producer Martin Manulis decided the material would be ideal as a motion picture, but some critics observed that the film, directed by Blake Edwards, lacked the impact of the original television production. In an article written for DVD Journal, critic D. K. Holm noted alterations from the original:

When the opportunity arose to make a film version of J. P. Miller's powerful TV drama Days of Wine and Roses, actor Jack Lemmon suggested that the studio hire Blake Edwards (according to Edwards, that is) rather than the Playhouse 90 production's original director, John Frankenheimer. On the big screen, Roses began as a Fox project, but ended up at Warner Bros. when the Fox studio started going down the Nile with Cleopatra. With the advent of Lemmon's participation, little remained of the founding teleplay, except for actor Charles Bickford reprising his role. Edwards had started out in television, too, first as a writer then after that mostly noted for the series Peter Gunn, and when he moved into features he was associated with comedies. Lemmon, too, had been in a long string of comedies, and it's easy to assume that both filmmakers were using the opportunity to "stretch". Unfortunately, Edwards, who is kind of a combination of George Stevens (comedy director turned prestige filmmaker) and Vincente Minnelli (excitable content with no distinctive visual style), tilted the original material towards schmaltz, from the comically lush theme-song by Henry Mancini to the exaggerated binge scenes. According to one Lemmon biography, the actor felt a little bad about the fact that his friend Cliff Robertson, who had appeared in the TV production, wasn't invited to be in the movie, but the studio insisted on a certified star for the film... What's missing is the calm plausibility of the original TV broadcast, revived briefly on cable TV in the 1990s.

== Films ==
Miller's theatrical films include The Rabbit Trap (1959), The Young Savages (1961, with Edward Anhalt), Days of Wine and Roses (1962) and Behold a Pale Horse (1964). In 1970, Dell published The People Next Door when the movie adaptation was released that year. His TV movies include Helter Skelter (CBS, 1976), for which he won an Edgar Award. He was a member of the Writers Guild of America, West.

== Articles ==
Miller, JP (July 25, 1962). "How to Be Noticed". Lawrence Journal-World. Lawrence, Kansas.

== Novels ==
In addition to poetry and short stories, Miller wrote four novels. The Race for Home (Dial, 1968) has a South Texas setting. Surviving Joy (Donald I. Fine, 1995) concerns a young boy named Dub Johnson in Depression-era Houston. His other novels are Liv (Dial, 1973) and The Skook (Warner Books, 1984), about a spelunker confronting a cave creature who may or may not be from his own imagination. In what was the first use of a hologram on a book cover, the Skook was sketched by Miller and then sculpted by Eidetic Images, Inc., an American Bank Note subsidiary. Warner Books paid $6000 for the hologram elements, part of a $50,000 publicity campaign.

The novelization of Days of Wine and Roses is usually credited to Miller, but he did not, in fact, write it. The prose adaptation was by David Westheimer, a mainstream novelist of some note (Von Ryan's Express, among others), who was also a friend of Miller's; but he only received by-line credit on the book's first iteration, a movie tie-in edition featuring cover stills from the film. The book proved hugely popular, though, and the story had become so iconic that its publisher Bantam Books (and one supposes the authors, by mutual arrangement) took Westheimer's name off the book to move it into the "literature" category and keep it in print (which they did, for decades). Subsequent printings were branded only "JP Miller's Days of Wine and Roses" without an explicit by-line for the novel itself. This novelization was followed by another in 1970, adapting the screenplay for The People Next Door, published by Dell Books. And once again, no author is given direct attribution for the prose; the cover says, "JP Miller's penetrating story of teenagers on drugs and parents on trial"; and the title page says only that the book is "based on the original story [sic] by JP Miller," with his name positioned to imply authorship. As the writing style is much the same, it's probably safe to assume that Westheimer (at Miller's invitation) was the novelizer here too.

In 1965, Miller moved to Stockton, New Jersey, where he lived for the next 36 years. He developed a routine of writing seven days a week for four hours in the morning, playing tennis in the afternoons, relaxing with his tennis pals at the Swan Hotel in Lambertville, New Jersey, and doing research in the evenings. "One thing that characterized him was that he never stopped working," said film producer Ingo Preminger, who was one of Miller's agents.

== Personal life ==
After his first marriage to Ayers Elizabeth Fite, Miller married Juanita Marie Currie. On November 24, 1965, he married Liane Nicolaus. His children are James P. Miller, Jr. (from his first marriage); John R. and Montgomery A. (second marriage); and journalist Lia Marie, Anthony Milo and Sophie Jetta (third marriage). At the age of 81, Miller died of pneumonia at the Hunterdon Medical Center in Flemington, New Jersey, having completed a first draft of his World War II memoirs, A Ship Without a Shore. He was buried in Mount Hope Cemetery, in Lambertville, New Jersey.

== Revivals ==

In 2003, Rachel Wood directed the New York stage premiere of Days of Wine and Roses, an off-Broadway production by the Boomerang Theatre Company. In 2005, the Northern Irish writer Owen McCafferty relocated Days of Wine and Roses to London in the 1960s, reworking it to focus on a young couple just arrived from Belfast. That stage version had a West End premiere at the Donmar Warehouse in a Sam Mendes production directed by Peter Gill, who had previously staged McCafferty's National Theatre hit, Scenes from the Big Picture.

== Influence ==
In 1994–1995, Miller taught a playwriting workshop. Judi Barton, one of the students, said, "Without him my play, Opening Act, would never have been written." Her play premiered at Philadelphia's Lantern Theater in 1999. The playwright P. J. Gibson, who became a Miller student when she was 14, has written poetry, short stories and 22 plays, including Long Time Since Yesterday.
