= Black Gold (Nina Simone album) =

Live album by Nina Simone
- Released: January 1970
- Recorded: October 26, 1969
- Venues: Philharmonic Hall, New York City
- Genres: Jazz, pop, folk
- Length: 49:36
- Label: RCA Victor
- Producer: Stroud Productions (Andrew Stroud)

Nina Simone chronology
To Love Somebody (1969)	Black Gold (1970)	Here Comes the Sun (1971)

Professional ratings
Review scores
Source	Rating
Allmusic	?

Black Gold is a live album by American jazz musician Nina Simone recorded in 1969 at the Philharmonic Hall, New York City. It was then released in January 1970. She got a 1971 nomination for a Grammy Award for Best Female R&B Vocal Performance, but lost to Aretha Franklin's cover of "Don't Play That Song".

The album is especially notable because it features the civil rights anthem song "To Be Young, Gifted and Black". The performance that night also included a calypso version of Leonard Cohen's "Suzanne" (which Simone had recorded on To Love Somebody), but there was no room for it on the album.

With the release of the album also came an LP called Come Together with Nina Simone. It was a recorded interview about the album. The questions were provided in written form, so that radio DJs could ask the questions and play Simone's recorded answers, as if she were in the studio.

== Track listing ==
No.	Title	Writer(s)	Length
1.	"Black Is the Color of My True Love's Hair"	Traditional	5:58
2.	"Black Is the Color of My True Love's Hair" (Vocal by Emile Latimer)	Traditional	4:00
3.	"Ain't Got No, I Got Life"	Galt MacDermot, James Rado, Gerome Ragni	5:28
4.	"Westwind"	Caiphus Semenya	9:30
5.	"Who Knows Where the Time Goes?"	Sandy Denny	8:09
6.	"The Assignment Sequence"	Jan Hendin	6:57
7.	"To Be Young, Gifted and Black"	Weldon Irvine, Nina Simone	9:34

== Personnel ==
- Nina Simone – piano, vocals, arrangements
- Emile Latimer – guitar, vocals on "Black Is the Color of My True Love's Hair"
- Tom Smith – guitar
- Weldon Irvine – organ
- Don Alias – drums, percussion
- Jumma Santos – congas, percussion

Technical

- Ed Begley - recording engineer
- Jack Medkiff - cover design

== Charts ==
Chart (1970)	Peak position
US Billboard 200	149
US Hot R&B LPs	21
