= Bob and Marcia =

Former Jamaican musical artists

Bob and Marcia were a Jamaican vocal duo, that consisted of Bob Andy and Marcia Griffiths. They had a No. 5 UK hit single in 1970 with "Young, Gifted and Black". They followed up with "Pied Piper", which peaked at No. 11 in the UK Singles Chart in 1971. Those two releases spent a total of 25 weeks in that chart in a period of less than 18 months. They discontinued their partnership in the mid-1970s, both feeling that it was not bringing them adequate financial reward.

== Discography ==
=== Albums ===
Title	Album details
Young Gifted and Black	Released: 1970; Label: Trojan, Harry J
Pied Piper	Released: 1971; Label: Trojan, Harry J
Kemar	Released: 1977; Label: Harry J; US-only release
Sweet Memories	Released: 1997; Label: Nectar
Pied Piper – The Best of Bob & Marcia	Released: October 2002; Label: Trojan
An Evening with Bob & Marcia	Released: 2 May 2017; Label: VP, Upstairs Music; US-only release

=== Singles ===
Title	Year	Peak chart positions				
Title	Year	UK	BE (FLA)	BE (WA)	IRE	NL
"Always Together"	1968	—	—	—	—	—
"Young Gifted and Black"	1970	5	18	47	15	15
"Got to Get Ourselves Together"	1970	—	—	—	—	—
"Pied Piper"	1971	11	—	—	—	—
"Rocking Good Way"	1971	—	—	—	—	—
"Lean on Me"	1972	—	—	—	—	—
"Let's Be Friends"	1973	—	—	—	—	—
"Sweet Memories"	1973	—	—	—	—	—
"I Like to Love the Life"	1974	—	—	—	—	—
"I Loved You"	1974	—	—	—	—	—
"To Be Young Gifted and Black" (re-release)	1976	54 (Note: Chart position is from the UK "Breakers List".)	—	—	—	—
"Really Together"	1987	—	—	—	—	—
"—" denotes releases that did not chart or were not released in that territory.
