= Fredrick McKissack =

American writer (1939–2013)

Fredrick Lemuel "Fred" McKissack, Sr. (August 12, 1939 – April 28, 2013) was an American writer, best known for collaborating with his wife, Patricia C. McKissack, on more than 100 children's books about the history of African-Americans.

The McKissacks jointly received the biennial American Library Association Coretta Scott King – Virginia Hamilton Award for Lifetime Achievement in 2014 (after Fredrick's death).

== Biography ==
McKissack was born in 1939 to a prominent family of African-American architects in Nashville, Tennessee—McKissack & McKissack, "widely regarded as the oldest African-American-owned architectural and construction firm in the United States". After high school, McKissack joined the United States Marines, before earning a degree in civil engineering from Tennessee State University. He was active in the Civil Rights Movement of the 1960s, participating in sit-ins to end segregation.

In 1964, McKissack and Patricia Leanna Carwell married, eventually having three children. In the early 1980s, the couple began writing children's books together, focusing on African-American history, which they felt was underrepresented in children's literature. "In those days there were so few books for and about the African-American child...Black kids needed to see themselves in books."

Patricia had been a teacher and an editor of religious books. She did most of the writing while Fredrick focused on research. She said later, "He was gone most of the time. He was always into an interview trying to scrounge out some little piece of information."

McKissack was survived by three brothers and five grandchildren as well as the couple's three sons: Frederick L. McKissack, Jr., and twins Robert and John.

== Selected works ==
The seven books below, marked with a double asterisk, were written by Fredrick and Patricia McKissack and are among the 10 works by Fredrick McKissack most widely held in WorldCat participating libraries. (Three are among her 10 most widely held works.)

- The Civil Rights Movement in America from 1865 to the Present** (1987)
- A Long Hard Journey: The Story of the Pullman Porter** (1989) – 1990 Coretta Scott King Author Award
- Sojourner Truth: Ain't I a Woman?** (1992) ‡
- Madam C.J. Walker, with Patricia McKissack (1993) – 1993 Carter G. Woodson Book Award
- Christmas in the Big House, Christmas in the Quarters** (1994) – 1995 Coretta Scott King Author Award
- Rebels Against Slavery: American Slave Revolts** (1996) ‡
- Young, Black, and Determined, with Patricia McKissack (1998)
- Black Hands, White Sails: The Story of African-American Whalers** (1999) ‡
- Days Of Jubilee: The End of Slavery in the United States** (2002) ‡

‡ Besides the two Coretta Scott King Award winners, four collaborations by the husband-and-wife team were runners-up, or Coretta Scott King Honor Books (in the writers category).
