= The Skook =

1984 novel by JP Miller

The Skook is a novel by JP Miller published in 1984.

== Plot summary ==
The Skook is a novel in which Span Barrmann becomes trapped in a cave because of biker cultists, and must escape with the aid of a fairytale creature called the Skook.

== Reception ==
Dave Langford reviewed The Skook for White Dwarf #79, and stated that "His escape story is an epic quest in little, beset by extinct creatures of the underworld deep. Meanwhile, the minor characters glow with life, from Span's semi-nympho wife, to bikers who outdo Charles Manson in nasty inventiveness. Recommended."

== Reviews ==
- Review by Algis Budrys (1985) in The Magazine of Fantasy & Science Fiction, January 1985
- Review by Don D'Ammassa (1986) in Science Fiction Chronicle, #77 February 1986
- Review by Tom Easton (1986) in Analog Science Fiction/Science Fact, March 1986
- Review by Anne Gay (1986) in Fantasy Review, September 1986
