= To Be Young, Gifted and Black (play) =

American play

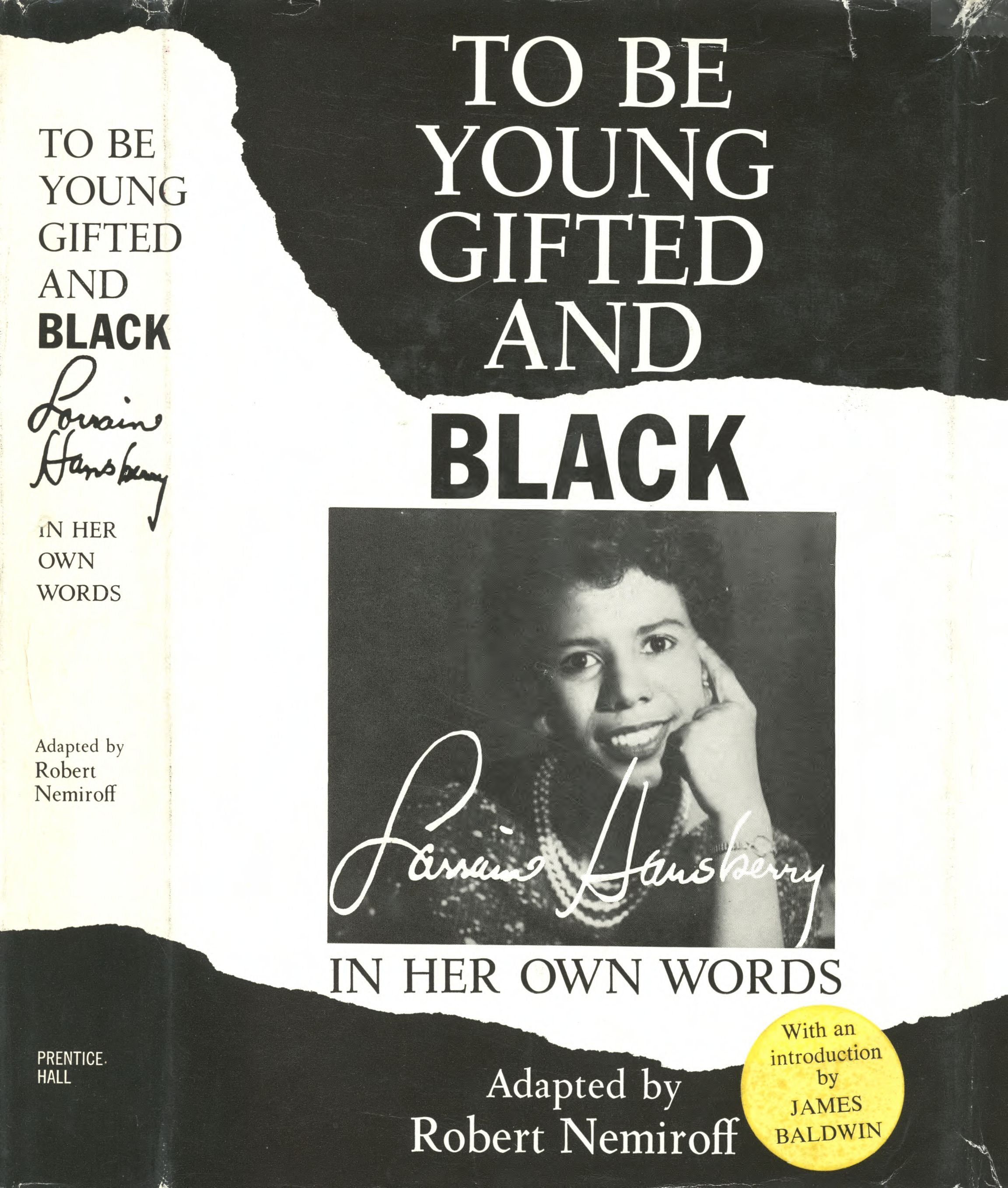
First edition 1969 dust jacket

To Be Young, Gifted and Black: Lorraine Hansberry in her Own Words is a play about the life of American writer Lorraine Hansberry, adapted from her writings. Hansberry was best known for her 1959 play A Raisin in the Sun, the first show on Broadway written by an African-American woman. After her death in 1965, Hansberry's ex-husband and friend, songwriter and poet Robert Nemiroff, collated her unpublished writings and adapted them into a stage play that first ran from 1968 to 1969 off Broadway. It was then converted into an equally successful autobiography with the same title.

Nina Simone wrote a song with this title, inspired by Hansberry's play and book.

== Synopsis ==
The play was adapted from Lorraine's letters, interviews, and journal entries. It begins at the start of Lorraine's life, highlighting her early childhood in a Chicago ghetto to her college years and then later life, including the creation and inspiration for A Raisin in the Sun. Her journey from Chicago to New York was complicated by obstacles she overcame in order to get her play on Broadway and incorporates fragments of her personal life, such as her marriage and involvement in politics (e.g., her strong support of racial and gender equality). The play concludes with her battle with terminal illness, from which she eventually died at 34.

== Reception ==
The play was well received and was one of the most successful plays off-Broadway during the 1968–1969 season. The play is still anthologized and performed around the world. The autobiography adapted from the play was also critically acclaimed.

In 1972, Michael Schultz directed a made-for-TV movie, also titled To Be Young, Gifted and Black, based on the stage play. It featured Roy Scheider, Blythe Danner, and Ruby Dee.

== See also ==
- Hansberry v. Lee
