= To Be Young, Gifted and Black =

1970 song by Nina Simone

Song by Nina Simone

from the album Black Gold
- Released: 1970
- Recorded: October 26, 1969
- Venue: Philharmonic Hall, New York City
- Genre: Soul, blues
- Length: 9:34
- Label: RCA
- Composer: Nina Simone
- Lyricist: Weldon Irvine
- Producer: Stroud Productions

Official audio
- "Nina Simone - To Be Young, Gifted and Black (Audio)" on YouTube

"To Be Young, Gifted and Black" is a song by Nina Simone with lyrics by Weldon Irvine. Simone introduced the song on August 17, 1969, to a crowd of 50,000 at the Harlem Cultural Festival, captured on broadcast video tape and released in 2021 as the documentary film Summer of Soul. Two months later, she recorded the song as part of her concert at Philharmonic Hall, a performance that resulted in her live album Black Gold (1970). Released as a single, it peaked at number 8 on the R&B chart and number 76 on the Hot 100 in January 1970. A cover version by Jamaican duo Bob and Marcia reached number 5 on the UK Singles Chart in 1970.

The title of the song comes from Lorraine Hansberry's autobiographical play To Be Young, Gifted and Black. The song is considered an anthem of the Black Pride movement.

== Background ==
"To Be Young, Gifted and Black" was written in memory of Simone's late friend Lorraine Hansberry, author of the play A Raisin in the Sun, who had died in 1965 aged 34.

== Legacy ==
"To Be Young, Gifted and Black" is widely regarded as one of Simone's best songs. In 2022, American Songwriter ranked the song number five on their list of the 10 greatest Nina Simone songs, and in 2023, The Guardian ranked the song number three on their list of the 20 greatest Nina Simone songs.

== Cover versions ==
Notable cover versions of the song were recorded by:

- Donny Hathaway (on his 1970 album Everything Is Everything),
- Aretha Franklin (on her 1972 album Young, Gifted and Black)
- Bob and Marcia (whose 1970 recording reached number 5 in the UK Singles Chart and number 15 in Ireland).
- Jamaican rocksteady/reggae trio the Heptones recorded a version for Coxsone Dodd's Studio One label in 1970.
- Elton John recorded a version of "To Be Young, Gifted and Black" in 1970, before his solo success. Intended to be released as a low-budget sound-alike version of the original, it was reissued in 1994 on the compilation album Covers as Sung by Elton John.
- American singer Meshell Ndegeocello included a version on her 2012 tribute album Pour une Âme Souveraine: A Dedication to Nina Simone.
- Michael Kiwanuka recorded a version in 2021 for an episode of Small Axe.

== Samples ==
- The song has also become a popular sample amongst various modern R&B/hip-hop pieces, including Rah Digga's 2003 unreleased record "On the Move", Faith Evans' 2014 single "I Deserve It", featuring Missy Elliott and Sharaya J, and on the title track of Rapsody's 2017 album Laila's Wisdom.
