= Sounds of Summer Tour 2015 =

2015 concert tour by Dierks Bentley

Sounds of Summer Tour
- Tour by Dierks Bentley
- Promotional poster for the tour
- Associated album: Riser
- Start date: June 5, 2015
- End date: September 12, 2015
- No. of shows: 34

Dierks Bentley concert chronology
- Riser Tour (2014); Sounds of Summer Tour (2015); Somewhere on a Beach Tour (2016)

The Sounds of Summer Tour was the tenth headlining concert tour by American country music artist Dierks Bentley, in support of his seventh studio album Riser (2014). It began on June 6, 2015, in Raleigh, North Carolina and ended in Bonner Springs, Kansas on September 12 of that year. The tour traveled across North America.

== Background ==
On January 12, 2015, the tour was first announced. Tickets first went on sale on January 26, 2015, and the tour is a part of Live Nation's Country Megaticket. Supporting Bentley out on tour are: Kip Moore, Maddie & Tae and Canaan Smith. Bentley said that these three acts "are three of the hottest rising artists out there right now" and he feels "fortunate to be spending the summer with them."

== Reception ==
Ed Masley of The Arizona Republic said of the Phoenix show, "It was an entertaining night that found the singer in excellent voice throughout while leading a stage full of top-notch musicians in a set that struck just the right balance between his upbeat party songs and heartfelt moments that at times recalled the feel of a Bruce Springsteen concert."

== Opening acts ==
- Kip Moore
- Maddie & Tae
- Canaan Smith

== Setlist ==
1. "Sideways"
2. "Am I the Only One"
3. "5-1-5-0"
4. "Tip It On Back"
5. "Every Mile a Memory"
6. "I Hold On"
7. "Feel That Fire"
8. "Sounds of Summer"
9. "Riser"
10. "Lot of Leavin' Left to Do"

B Stage

11. "Come a Little Closer"
12. "Back Porch"
13. "Home"

Main Stage

14. "Up on the Ridge"
15. "Free and Easy (Down the Road I Go)" (with Maddie & Tae)
16. "Say You Do"

Encore

17. "What Was I Thinkin'"
18. "Drunk on a Plane"

== Tour dates ==
Date	City	Country	Venue	Attendance	Gross revenue
North America
June 5, 2015	Raleigh	United States	Walnut Creek Amphitheatre	—	—
June 6, 2015	Cuyahoga Falls	United States	Blossom Music Center	19,992 / 19,992	$638,826
June 12, 2015^{[A]}	Buffalo	United States	WYRK's 16th Anniversary	—	—
June 13, 2015^{[B]}	Lansing	United States	Cooley Law School Stadium	—	—
June 18, 2015	Maryland Heights	United States	Hollywood Casino Amphitheatre	—	—
June 19, 2015 ^{[C]}	Chicago	United States	FirstMerit Bank Pavilion	—	—
June 20, 2015	Burgettstown	United States	First Niagara Pavilion	—	—
June 26. 2015	New York City	United States	Central Park, GMA's Summer Stage		
June 26. 2015	New York City	United States	Randall's Island Park	—	—
June 27, 2015	Mansfield	United States	Xfinity Center	—	—
June 28, 2015	Camden	United States	Susquehanna Bank Center	—	—
July 2, 2015	Tampa	United States	MidFlorida Credit Union Amphitheatre	—	—
July 3, 2015	West Palm Beach	United States	Perfect Vodka Amphitheatre	—	—
July 9, 2015	Virginia Beach	United States	Farm Bureau Live	—	—
July 16, 2015^{[E]}	Morristown	United States	Jamboree in the Hills	—	—
July 17, 2015	Charlotte	United States	PNC Music Pavilion	—	—
July 18, 2015	Pelham	United States	Oak Mountain Amphitheatre	—	—
July 20, 2015^{[F]}	Oshkosh	United States	Wittman Regional Airport	—	—
July 24, 2015^{[G]}	Twin Lakes	United States	Country Thunder	—	—
July 31, 2015^{[H]}	Sweet Home	United States	Oregon Jamboree	—	—
August 1, 2015^{[I]}	Merritt	Canada	Rockin' River Country Music Festival	—	—
August 2, 2015^{[J]}	George	United States	The Gorge Amphitheatre	—	—
August 7, 2015^{[K]}	Detroit Lakes	United States	WE Fest	—	—
August 8, 2015^{[L]}	Prairie du Chien	United States	Country on the River	—	—
August 9, 2015^{[M]}	Norfolk	United States	Divots Events Center	—	—
August 13, 2015	Englewood	United States	Fiddler's Green Amphitheatre	—	—
August 14, 2015	Albuquerque	United States	Isleta Amphitheater	—	—
August 15, 2015	Phoenix	United States	Ak-Chin Pavilion	—	—
August 16, 2015	Chula Vista	United States	Sleep Train Amphitheatre	—	—
August 20, 2015	Fresno	United States	Save Mart Center	5,460 / 9,624	$226,404
August 21, 2015	Mountain View	United States	Shoreline Amphitheatre	—	—
August 22, 2015	Wheatland	United States	Toyota Amphitheatre	—	—
September 3, 2015	Hopewell	United States	CMAC	—	—
September 4, 2015	Cincinnati	United States	Riverbend Music Center	—	—
September 5, 2015	Noblesville	United States	Klipsch Music Center	—	—
September 12, 2015	Bonner Springs	United States	Cricket Wireless Amphitheater	—	—

List of festivals and miscellaneous performances.
^{A} This concert is a part of WYRK's 16th Anniversary Listener Appreciation Concert.
^{B} This concert is a part of WITL's Taste of Country Music Festival.
^{C} This concert is a part of the Windy City Lakeshake Festival.
^{D} This concert is a part of the Farmborough Festival.
^{E} This concert is a part of Jamboree in the Hills.
^{F} This concert is a part of the EAA AirVenture Oshkosh 2015.
^{G} This concert is a part of Country Thunder.
^{H} This concert is a part of the Oregon Jamboree.
^{I} This concert is a part of the Rockin' River Music Fest.
^{J} This concert is a part of the Watershed Festival.
^{K} This concert is a part of the WE Fest.
^{L} This concert is a part of Country on the River.
^{M} This concert is a part of the Divots Concert Series.
