= Riser Tour =

2014 concert tour by Dierks Bentley

- Tour by Dierks Bentley
- Promotional poster for the tour
- Associated album: Riser
- Start date: May 9, 2014
- End date: December 6, 2014
- Legs: 2
- No. of shows: 68

Dierks Bentley concert chronology
- Locked & Reloaded Tour (2013); Riser Tour (2014); Sounds of Summer Tour 2015 (2015)

The Riser Tour was the ninth headlining concert tour by American country music artist Dierks Bentley, in support of his seventh studio album Riser (2014).

The tour was first announced in January 2014 and began on May 9, 2014, in Charlotte, North Carolina, with the first leg ending on September 27, 2014, in Noblesville, Indiana. Chris Young, Chase Rice, and Jon Pardi served as opening acts.

About the tour, Bentley said, "This tour is the culmination of everything I've been working on for the past two years, both out on the road and in the studio recording 'Riser'". "I know my fans want a kick ass show, an affordable ticket and a good parking lot scene to set the pregame going". "when it comes time for my set, I can promise that we are going big! I have never been more excited about a tour".

The second leg of the tour was announced on August 11, 2014, and began in October 2014, in Stockton, California. Randy Houser, Eric Paslay and Tim Hicks were the opening acts. Bentley said, "It's going to be tough to top this summer, but every night I get more excited and don't want this run to end. I'm just living in the moment as much as I can and taking it all in...it really has been the best summer of my life."

== Opening acts ==
First leg

- Chris Young
- Chase Rice
- Jon Pardi
- Cassadee Pope
- Neal McCoy (Camden only)

Second leg

- Randy Houser
- Eric Paslay
- Tim Hicks
- Eric Paslay
- Randy Houser

== Setlist ==
1. "5-1-5-0"
2. "Am I the Only One"
3. "Free and Easy (Down the Road I Go)"
4. "Tip It On Back"
5. "Feel That Fire"
6. "Every Mile a Memory"
7. "Lot of Leavin' Left to Do"
8. "Bourbon in Kentucky"
9. "Up on the Ridge"
10. "Counting Stars" (OneRepublic cover)
11. "Livin' on a Prayer (Bon Jovi cover)
12. "Say You Do"
13. "Come a Little Closer"
14. "I Hold On"
18. "What Was I Thinkin'"
19. "Drunk on a Plane"
19. "Sideways"
20. "Home"

== Tour dates ==
Date	City	Country	Venue
Leg 1
May 9, 2014	Charlotte	United States	PNC Music Pavilion
May 10, 2014	Raleigh	United States	Walnut Creek Amphitheatre
May 16, 2014	Virginia Beach	United States	Farm Bureau Live
May 17, 2014	Bristow	United States	Jiffy Lube Live
May 18, 2014	Holmdel	United States	PNC Bank Arts Center
May 24, 2014	Bossier City	United States	Horseshoe Bossier City
May 25, 2014 ^{[A]}	Tunica Resorts	United States	Delta Country Jam
May 30, 2014 ^{[B]}	Detroit	United States	Comerica Park
May 31, 2014 ^{[C]}	Camden	United States	Susquehanna Bank Center
June 1, 2014	Scranton	United States	Toyota Pavilion
June 5, 2014 ^{[D]}	Nashville	United States	LP Field
June 6, 2014	Chillicothe	United States	3 Sisters Park
June 7, 2014 ^{[E]}	Martin	United States	US 131 Motorsports Park
June 12, 2014	Portland	United States	Maine State Pier
June 13, 2014 ^{[F]}	Hunter	United States	Taste of Country Music Festival
June 14, 2014 ^{[G]}	Thornville	United States	WCOL Country Jam 2014
June 19, 2014	Newport	United States	Newport Yachting Center
June 20, 2014	Hopewell	United States	CMAC
June 21, 2014	Pittsburgh	United States	Heinz Field (Opened for Luke Bryan)
June 27, 2014 ^{[H]}	Oklahoma City	United States	OKC Festival
June 28, 2014	Rogers	United States	Walmart Arkansas Music Pavilion
July 4, 2014 ^{[I]}	Fort Worth	United States	Willie Nelson's 4 July Picnic
July 9, 2014 ^{[J]}	LaPorte	United States	LaPorte County Fair
July 12, 2014 ^{[K]}	Craven	Canada	Craven Country Jamboree
July 18, 2014 ^{[L]}	Eau Claire	United States	Country Jam USA
July 19, 2014	Council Bluffs	United States	Stir Concert Cove
July 20, 2014	Maryland Heights	United States	Verizon Wireless Amphitheatre
July 23, 2014	Morrison	United States	Red Rocks Amphitheatre
July 24, 2014	Park City	United States	Snow Park Amphitheater
July 25, 2014	Los Angeles	United States	Greek Theatre
July 26, 2014	Phoenix	United States	Ak-Chin Pavilion
July 27, 2014	Chula Vista	United States	Sleep Train Amphitheatre
July 31, 2014	Mountain View	United States	Shoreline Amphitheatre
August 1, 2014	Las Vegas	United States	The Axis at Planet Hollywood
August 3, 2014 ^{[M]}	Cape Blanco	United States	Cape Blanco Country Music Festival
August 10, 2014	Foxborough	United States	Gillette Stadium (Opened for Luke Bryan)
August 11, 2014 ^{[N]}	Hamburg	United States	Erie County Fair
August 16, 2014 ^{[O]}	Havelock	Canada	Havelock Country Jamboree
August 22, 2014	Essex Junction	United States	Champlain Valley Expo
August 23, 2014 ^{[P]}	Huron-Kinloss	Canada	Music in the Fields Festival
August 30, 2014 ^{[Q]}	Panama City Beach	United States	Pepsi Gulf Coast Jam
August 31, 2014	Chicago	United States	Soldier Field (Opened for Luke Bryan)
September 11, 2014	Glen Allen	United States	Innsbrook Pavilion
September 20, 2014	Huntsville	United States	Brimsbe Recreation
September 25, 2014	Cincinnati	United States	Riverbend Music Center
September 26, 2014	Cuyahoga Falls	United States	Blossom Music Center
September 27, 2014	Noblesville	United States	Klipsch Music Center
Leg 2
October 2, 2014	Stockton	United States	Stockton Arena
October 3, 2014 ^{[R]}	Fresno	United States	Big Fresno Fair
October 4, 2014 ^{[S]}	Las Vegas	United States	Route 91 Harvest Festival
October 10, 2014	Boise	United States	Taco Bell Arena
October 11, 2014	Missoula	United States	Adams Center
October 10, 2014	Boise	United States	Taco Bell Arena
October 19, 2014	Edmonton	Canada	Rexall Place
October 19, 2014	Saskatoon	Canada	Credit Union Centre
October 20, 2014	Calgary	Canada	Scotiabank Saddledome
October 22, 2014	Winnipeg	Canada	MTS Centre
October 23, 2014	Fargo	United States	Fargodome
October 24, 2014	Bismarck	United States	Bismarck Civic Center
October 25, 2014	Brookings	United States	Swiftel Center
November 13, 2014	Hershey	United States	Giant Center
November 14, 2014	Bethlehem	United States	Sands Bethlehem Event Center
November 15, 2014	Uncasville	United States	Mohegan Sun Arena
November 16, 2014	Utica	United States	Utica Memorial Auditorium
November 20, 2014	Huntington	United States	Big Sandy Superstore Arena
November 21, 2014	Roanoke	United States	Roanoke Civic Center
November 22, 2014	Baltimore	United States	Royal Farms Arena
December 2, 2014	Ottawa	Canada	Canadian Tire Centre
December 4, 2014	Hamilton	Canada	Copps Coliseum
December 5, 2014	Oshawa	Canada	General Motors Centre
December 6, 2014	London	Canada	Budweiser Gardens
January 31, 2015^{[T]}	Phoenix	United States	US Airways Center

=== Notes ===
- ^{A} This concert was a part of Delta Country Jam.
- ^{B} This concert was a part of the WYCD Hoedown.
- ^{C} This concert was a part of the WXTU 30th Anniversary Show.
- ^{D} This concert was a part of CMA Music Festival.
- ^{E} This concert was a part of the B-93 Birthday Bash.
- ^{F} This concert was a part of the Taste of Country Music Festival.
- ^{G} This concert was a part of the WCOL Country Jam 2014.
- ^{H} This concert was a part of OKC Festival.
- ^{I} This concert was a part of Willie Nelson's 4 July Picnic.
- ^{J} This concert was a part of the LaPorte County Fair.
- ^{K} This concert was a part of the Craven Country Jamboree.
- ^{L} This concert was a part of Country Jam USA.
- ^{M} This concert was a part of the Cape Blanco Country Music Festival.
- ^{N} This concert was a part of the Erie County Fair.
- ^{O} This concert was a part of the Havelock Country Jamboree.
- ^{P} This concert was a part of Music in the Fields Festival.
- ^{Q} This concert was a part of Pepsi Gulf Coast Jam.
- ^{R} This concert was a part of the Big Fresno Fair.
- ^{S} This concert was a part of the Route 91 Harvest Festival.
- ^{T} This concert is a part of "CBS Radio's The Night Before".

=== Box office score data ===
Venue	City	Tickets sold / available	Gross revenue
Amphitheater at the Wharf	Orange Beach	6,239 / 9,560 (65%)	$150,239
Mohegan Sun Arena	Uncasville	8,574 / 8,574 (100%)	$394,999
FirstOntario Centre	Hamilton	5,528 / 7,263	$254,943
General Motors Centre	Oshawa	5,292 / 5,292	$256,574
