= Somewhere on a Beach Tour =

2016 concert tour by Dierks Bentley

- Tour by Dierks Bentley
- Promotional poster for the tour
- Associated album: Black
- Start date: April 21, 2016
- End date: October 29, 2016
- Legs: 3
- No. of shows: 4 in Europe; 58 in North America; 62 total

Dierks Bentley concert chronology
- Sounds of Summer Tour 2015 (2015); Somewhere on a Beach Tour (2016); What the Hell World Tour (2017)

The Somewhere on a Beach Tour was the eleventh headlining concert tour by American country music artist Dierks Bentley, in support of his eighth studio album Black (2016). It began on April 21, 2016, in Dublin, Ireland and ended on October 29 of that year in Roanoke, Virginia.

== Background ==
The tour was first announced in January 2016. Bentley will first play four shows in Europe then begin the North American leg of the tour. Select shows are a part of Live Nation's Country Megaticket and went on sale January 29, 2016. Dates for the second North American leg was announced in July 2016.

== Opening acts ==
- Randy Houser
- Cam
- Tucker Beathard
- Drake White

== Setlist ==
1. "Up on the Ridge"
2. "Free and Easy (Down the Road I Go)"
3. "Tip It On Back"
4. "Am I the Only One"
5. "5-1-5-0"
6. "Say You Do"
7. "What the Hell Did I Say"
8. "I Hold On"
9. "Every Mile a Memory"
10. "Black"
11. "Feel that Fire"
12. "Riser"
13. "Take it Easy" (Eagles cover, performed with/Houser and Cam)
14. "Come a Little Closer"
15. "Freedom"
16. "Somewhere on a Beach"
17. "What Was I Thinkin'"
18. "The Runnin' Kind" (Merle Haggard cover
19. "Lot of Leavin' Left to Do"
20. "Sideways"
21. "I'll Be the Moon"
22. "Drunk on a Plane" (performed with Houser, Cam, and Beathard

Notes

- "The Runnin' Kind" and "Lot of Leavin' Left to Do" was performed in London.

== Tour dates ==
Date	City	Country	Venue	Opening acts	Attendance	Gross revenue
Europe
April 21, 2016	Dublin	Ireland	Olympia Theatre	—N/a	—N/a	—N/a
April 22, 2016	London	England	Eventim Apollo	—N/a	—N/a	—N/a
April 23, 2016	Manchester	England	O_{2} Apollo Manchester	—N/a	—N/a	—N/a
April 24, 2016	Glasgow	Scotland	Clyde Auditorium	—N/a	—N/a	—N/a
North America Leg 1
May 12, 2016	Holmdel	United States	PNC Bank Arts Center	Randy Houser; Cam; Tucker Beathard	—N/a	—N/a
May 13, 2016	Burgettstown	United States	First Niagara Pavilion	Randy Houser; Cam; Tucker Beathard	—N/a	—N/a
May 14, 2016	Camden	United States	BB&T Pavilion	Randy Houser; Cam; Tucker Beathard	—N/a	—N/a
May 20, 2016	Cuyahoga Falls	United States	Blossom Music Center	Randy Houser; Cam; Tucker Beathard	—N/a	—N/a
May 21, 2016	Tinley Park	United States	Hollywood Casino Amphitheatre	Randy Houser; Cam; Tucker Beathard	—N/a	—N/a
May 22, 2016	Clarkston	United States	DTE Energy Music Theatre	Randy Houser; Cam; Tucker Beathard	—N/a	—N/a
May 29, 2016	Baton Rouge	United States	Tiger Stadium	Randy Houser; Cam; Tucker Beathard	—N/a	—N/a
June 2, 2016	Scranton	United States	The Pavilion	Randy Houser; Cam; Tucker Beathard	—N/a	—N/a
June 3, 2016	Gilford	United States	Bank of New Hampshire Pavilion	Randy Houser; Cam; Tucker Beathard	4,768 / 7,741	$277,857
June 4, 2016	Bangor	United States	Darling's Waterfront Pavilion	Randy Houser; Cam; Tucker Beathard	—N/a	—N/a
June 10, 2016	Hartford	United States	Xfinity Theatre	Randy Houser; Cam; Tucker Beathard	—N/a	—N/a
June 11, 2016	Mansfield	United States	Xfinity Center	Randy Houser; Cam; Tucker Beathard	—N/a	—N/a
June 16, 2016 (Note: This concert was a part of the Chippewa Valley Country Fest.)	Cadott	United States	Chippewa Valley Country Fest	Randy Houser; Cam; Tucker Beathard	—N/a	—N/a
June 17, 2016 (Note: This concert was a part of the Moondance Jamin' Country Fest.)	Walker	United States	Moondance Jammin' Country Fest	Randy Houser; Cam; Tucker Beathard	—N/a	—N/a
June 19, 2016 (Note: This concert was a part of the Buckeye Country Superfest.)	Columbus	United States	Buckeye Country Superfest	Randy Houser; Cam; Tucker Beathard	—N/a	—N/a
June 23, 2016 (Note: This concert was a part of the Country Stampede Music Festival.)	Manhattan	United States	Turtle Lake State Park	Randy Houser; Cam; Tucker Beathard	—N/a	—N/a
June 24, 2016	Sioux City	United States	Tyson Events Center	Randy Houser; Cam; Tucker Beathard	—N/a	—N/a
June 25, 2016 (Note: This concert was a part of Nebraskaland Days.)	North Platte	United States	Nebraskaland Days	Randy Houser; Cam; Tucker Beathard	—N/a	—N/a
July 8, 2016 (Note: This concert was a part of the Country Concert at Hickory Hill Lakes.)	Fort Loramie	United States	Country Concert at Hickory Hill Lake	Randy Houser; Cam; Tucker Beathard	—N/a	—N/a
July 9, 2016 (Note: This concert was a part of the Common Ground Music Festival.)	Lansing	United States	Common Ground Music Festival	Randy Houser; Cam; Tucker Beathard	—N/a	—N/a
July 14, 2016	Charlotte	United States	PNC Music Pavilion	Randy Houser; Cam; Tucker Beathard	—N/a	—N/a
July 15, 2016	Atlanta	United States	Lakewood Amphitheatre	Randy Houser; Cam; Tucker Beathard	—N/a	—N/a
July 16, 2016	Tampa	United States	MidFlorida Credit Union Amphitheatre	Randy Houser; Cam; Tucker Beathard	—N/a	—N/a
July 17, 2016	Orange Beach	United States	Amphitheater at the Wharf	Randy Houser; Cam; Tucker Beathard	—N/a	—N/a
July 22, 2016	Raleigh	United States	Coastal Credit Union Music Park	Randy Houser; Cam; Tucker Beathard	—N/a	—N/a
July 23, 2016	Bristow	United States	Jiffy Lube Live	Randy Houser; Cam; Tucker Beathard	—N/a	—N/a
July 24, 2016	Virginia Beach	United States	Veterans United Home Loans Amphitheater	Randy Houser; Cam; Tucker Beathard	—N/a	—N/a
July 29, 2016 (Note: This concert was a part of the Big Valley Jamboree.)	Camrose	Canada	Big Valley Jamboree	Randy Houser; Cam; Tucker Beathard	—N/a	—N/a
July 31, 2016 (Note: This concert was a part of the Sunfest Country Festival.)	Duncan	Canada	Sunfest Country Festival	Randy Houser; Cam; Tucker Beathard	—N/a	—N/a
August 5, 2016 (Note: This concert was a part of the Boots and Hearts Music Festival.)	Wasaga Beach	Canada	Burls Creek Event Grounds	Randy Houser; Cam; Tucker Beathard	—N/a	—N/a
August 6, 2016	Syracuse	United States	Lakeview Amphitheater	Randy Houser; Cam; Tucker Beathard	—N/a	—N/a
August 12, 2016	Maryland Heights	United States	Hollywood Casino Amphitheatre	Randy Houser; Cam; Tucker Beathard	—N/a	—N/a
August 13, 2016	Noblesville	United States	Klipsch Music Center	Randy Houser; Cam; Tucker Beathard	—N/a	—N/a
August 15, 2016 (Note: This concert was a part of the Iowa State Fair.)	Des Moines	United States	Iowa State Fairgrounds	Randy Houser; Cam; Tucker Beathard	—N/a	—N/a
August 16, 2016	Springfield	United States	Illinois State Fair	Randy Houser; Cam; Tucker Beathard	—N/a	—N/a
August 20, 2016	Dallas	United States	Gexa Energy Pavilion	Randy Houser; Cam; Tucker Beathard	—N/a	—N/a
August 21, 2016	The Woodlands	United States	The Cynthia Woods Mitchell Pavilion	Randy Houser; Cam; Tucker Beathard	—N/a	—N/a
September 9, 2016	Mountain View	United States	Shoreline Amphitheatre	Randy Houser; Cam; Tucker Beathard	—N/a	—N/a
September 10, 2016	Irvine	United States	Irvine Meadows Amphitheatre	Randy Houser; Cam; Tucker Beathard	—N/a	—N/a
September 11, 2016	Chula Vista	United States	Sleep Train Amphitheatre	Randy Houser; Cam; Tucker Beathard	—N/a	—N/a
September 15, 2016	Ridgefield	United States	Sunlight Supply Amphitheater	Randy Houser; Cam; Tucker Beathard	—N/a	—N/a
September 16, 2016	Boise	United States	Taco Bell Arena	Randy Houser; Cam; Tucker Beathard	—N/a	—N/a
September 17, 2016	West Valley City	United States	USANA Amphitheatre	Randy Houser; Cam; Tucker Beathard	—N/a	—N/a
September 21, 2016	Airway Heights	United States	Northern Quest Resort & Casino	Randy Houser; Cam; Tucker Beathard	—N/a	—N/a
September 22, 2016 (Note: This concert is a part of the Washington State Fair.)	Puyallup	United States	Washington State Fair	Randy Houser; Cam; Tucker Beathard	—N/a	—N/a
September 23, 2016	Kennewick	United States	Toyota Center	Randy Houser; Cam; Tucker Beathard	—N/a	—N/a
September 24, 2016	Missoula	United States	Adams Center	Randy Houser; Cam; Tucker Beathard	—N/a	—N/a
September 26, 2016	Morrison	United States	Red Rocks Amphitheatre	Randy Houser; Cam; Tucker Beathard	—N/a	—N/a
September 27, 2016	Morrison	United States	Red Rocks Amphitheatre		—N/a	—N/a
North America Leg 2
October 13, 2016	Fort Wayne	United States	Allen County War Memorial Coliseum	Randy Houser; Drake White	—N/a	—N/a
October 14, 2016	Green Bay	United States	Resch Center	Randy Houser; Drake White	—N/a	—N/a
October 15, 2016	Grand Rapids, Michigan	United States	Van Andel Arena	Randy Houser; Drake White	7,907 / 9,978	$383,428
October 20, 2016	Jonesboro	United States	ASU Convocation Center	Randy Houser; Drake White	—N/a	—N/a
October 21, 2016	Columbia	United States	Mizzou Arena	Randy Houser; Drake White	—N/a	—N/a
October 22, 2016	Springfield	United States	JQH Arena	Randy Houser; Drake White	—N/a	—N/a
October 27, 2016	Champaign	United States	State Farm Center	Randy Houser; Drake White	—N/a	—N/a
October 28, 2016	Lexington	United States	Rupp Arena	Randy Houser; Drake White	—N/a	—N/a
October 29, 2016	Roanoke	United States	Berglund Center	Randy Houser; Drake White	—N/a	—N/a

List of festivals
