= 50th Academy of Country Music Awards =

US music awards ceremony in 2015

- Date: April 19, 2015
- Location: AT&T Stadium, Arlington, Texas
- Hosted by: Luke Bryan; Blake Shelton

Highlights
- Most wins: Miranda Lambert (3)
- Most nominations: Miranda Lambert (7)

Television/radio coverage
- Network: CBS

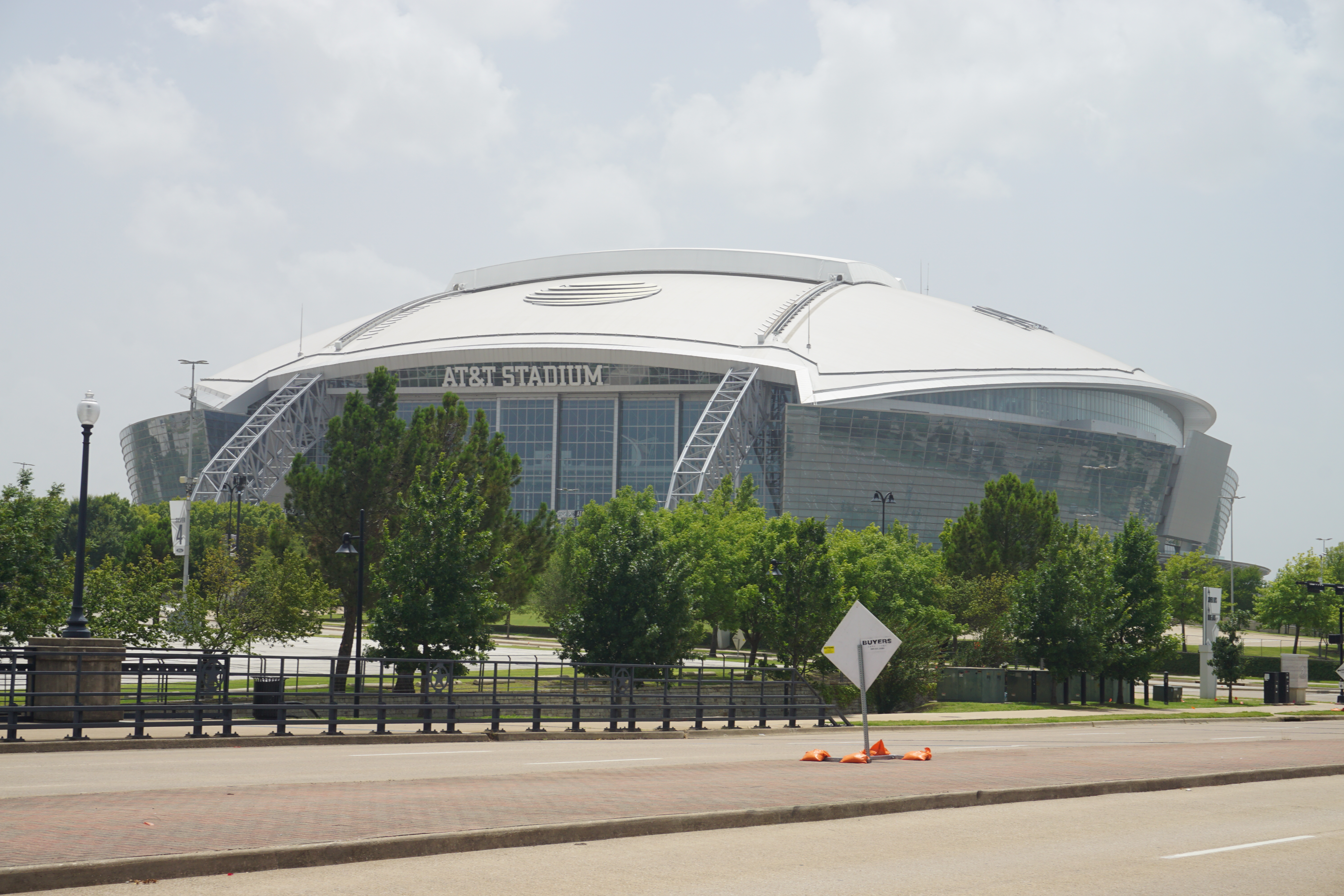
Exterior of the AT&T Stadium.

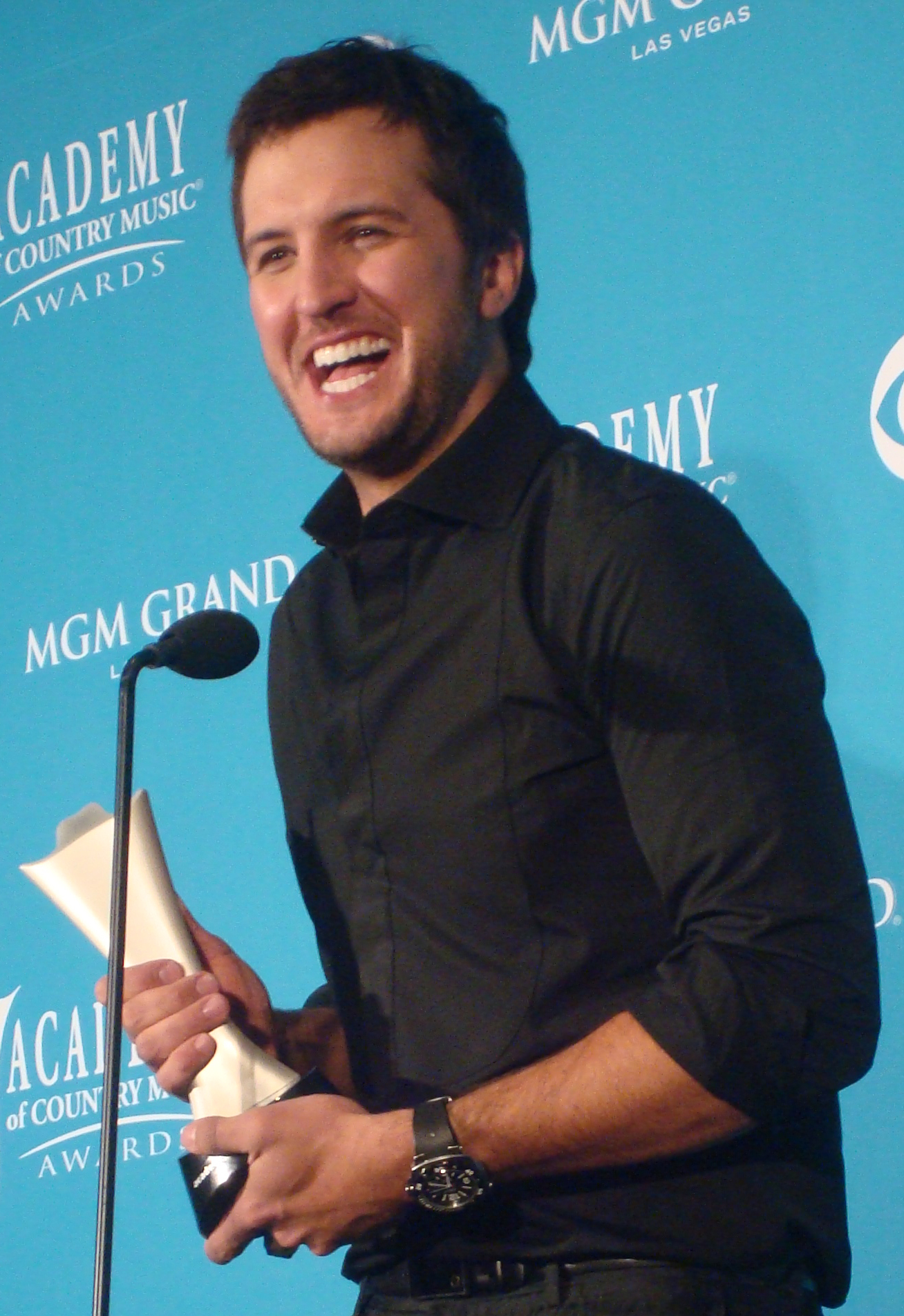
Luke Bryan, Entertainer of the Year recipient.

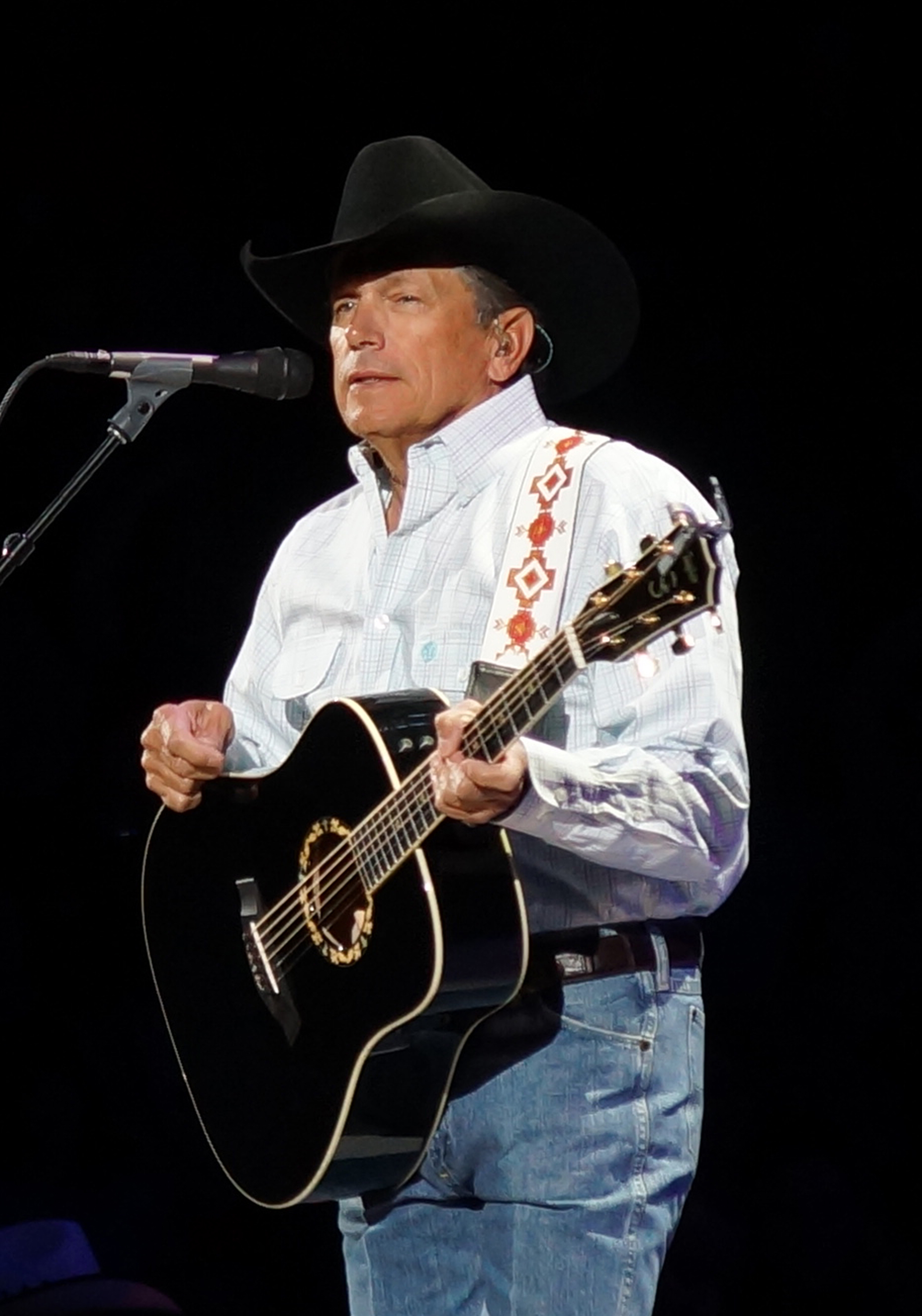
George Strait, one of the 50th Anniversary Milestone Award recipients.

The 50th Academy of Country Music Awards were held on April 19, 2015, at the AT&T Stadium in Arlington, Texas. The ceremony was hosted by Luke Bryan and Blake Shelton.

== Background ==
The awards honored artists in its usual categories, but also honored Milestone winners. The ceremony broke a Guinness World Record, with 70,252 attendees, making it the highest attended Awards show to be broadcast.

== Winners and nominees ==
The winners are shown in bold. Nominations for the 50th Academy of Country Music Awards were announced on January 30, 2015.

Entertainer of the Year (Note: From 2008 to 2015, 'Entertainer of the Year' was decided by a combination of ACM professional membership and fan votes cast online and via text message.)	Album of the Year
**Luke Bryan**; Jason Aldean; Garth Brooks; Miranda Lambert; Florida Georgia Line	**Platinum — Miranda Lambert**; Old Boots, New Dirt — Jason Aldean; Pain Killer — Little Big Town; Riser — Dierks Bentley; The Outsiders — Eric Church
Female Artist of the Year	Male Artist of the Year
**Miranda Lambert**; Brandy Clark; Martina McBride; Kacey Musgraves; Carrie Underwood	**Jason Aldean**; Dierks Bentley; Luke Bryan; Eric Church; Brad Paisley; Blake Shelton
Group of the Year	Duo of the Year
**Little Big Town**; Lady Antebellum; Rascal Flatts; The Band Perry; Zac Brown Band	**Florida Georgia Line**; Brothers Osborne; Dan + Shay; Maddie & Tae; The Swon Brothers
Single of the Year	Song of the Year
**"I Don't Dance" — Lee Brice**; "American Kids" — Kenny Chesney; "Automatic" — Miranda Lambert; "Dirt" — Florida Georgia Line; "Drunk On A Plane" — Dierks Bentley	**"Automatic" — Nicolle Galyon, Natalie Hemby, Miranda Lambert**; "American Kids" — Rodney Clawson, Luke Laird, Shane McAnally; "Drink A Beer" — Jim Beavers, Chris Stapleton; "Follow Your Arrow" — Brandy Clark, Shane McAnally, Kacey Musgraves; "Give Me Back My Hometown" — Eric Church, Luke Laird; "I Hold On" — Brett James, Dierks Bentley
Video of the Year	Vocal Event of the Year
**"American Kids" — Kenny Chesney**; "Cop Car" — Keith Urban; "Drunk On A Plane" — Dierks Bentley; "I'm Not Gonna Miss You" — Glen Campbell; "Somethin' Bad" — Miranda Lambert and Carrie Underwood	**"This Is How We Roll" — Florida Georgia Line and Luke Bryan**; "Lonely Tonight" — Blake Shelton and Ashley Monroe; "Meanwhile Back At Mama's" — Tim McGraw and Faith Hill; "Somethin' Bad" — Miranda Lambert and Carrie Underwood; "The South" — The Cadillac Three feat. Florida Georgia Line, Dierks Bentley, Mike Eli
50th Anniversary Milestone Award
**Garth Brooks**; **Brooks and Dunn**; **Kenny Chesney**; **Miranda Lambert**; **Reba McEntire**; **George Strait**; **Taylor Swift**
