= Wes Edwards =

American music video and commercial director

Wes Edwards is a music video and commercial director. He has directed over 150 official music videos in various genres from country to EDM. He has created multiple videos for Brothers Osborne, Dierks Bentley, Dash Berlin, and Emma Hewitt. In 2020 he co-founded production company Strange Arcade. In 2022 he directed the documentary series American Anthems with Academy and Emmy award winning Believe Entertainment Group for PBS.

Edwards has won two CMA Video Of The Year awards for videos he directed. He has won Three ACM awards for Video Of The Year, two as a director and one as a producer. In addition, he has won an award for CMT Video Of The Year and a GMA Dove Award for Video Of The Year.

He had two videos in Billboard Magazine's Top 100 Music Videos of the Decade (all genre) 2010-2020.

== Music videos directed ==
Year	Video	Artist
2001	"More of Your Love"	The Derailers
2002	"The Lowlands"	Nitty Gritty Dirt Band
2003	"Heavy Liftin'"	Blake Shelton
2004	"Leave It All Behind"	The Features
2005	"Hicktown"	Jason Aldean
2005	"Something to Be Proud Of"	Montgomery Gentry
2005	"I Ain't Your Mama"	Amber Dotson
2005	"Why"	Jason Aldean
2006	"The Dollar"	Jamey Johnson
2006	"I Got a Woman"	The Gibson Brothers
2006	"I Got You"	Craig Morgan
2006	"Yee Haw"	Jake Owen
2006	"Amarillo Sky"	Jason Aldean
2006	"Little Bit of Life"	Craig Morgan
2007	"Johnny Cash"	Jason Aldean
2007	"Guitar Slinger"	Crossin Dixon
2007	"I Wanna Feel Something"	Trace Adkins
2007	"Perfect Man"	Melissa Jones
2008	"Crazy Days"	Adam Gregory
2008	"I Love My Old Bird Dog (& I Love You)"	Crossin Dixon
2008	"Put a Girl in It"	Brooks & Dunn
2008	"Back That Thing Up"	Justin Moore
2009	"Goin' All Out"	Dan Evans
2009	"She's Country"	Jason Aldean
2009	"Everything's Right"	Matt Wertz
2009	"Beer on the Table"	Josh Thompson
2009	"Come On"	Green River Ordinance
2010	"My Best Days Are Ahead of Me"	Danny Gokey
2010	"Blame It on Waylon"	Josh Thompson
2010	"Way Out Here"	Josh Thompson
2010	"I Will Not Say Goodbye"	Danny Gokey
2010	"Are You Gonna Kiss Me or Not"	Thompson Square
2010	"Georgia Clay"	Josh Kelley
2010	"Hip Hop in a Honky Tonk"	Colt Ford with Kevin Fowler
2011	"If I Run"	The Harters
2011	"Won't Be Lonely Long"	Josh Thompson
2011	"Something Better"	The Dirt Drifters
2011	"I Got You"	Thompson Square
2011	"Fish"	Craig Campbell
2011	"Beautiful Maybe"	Marlee Scott
2011	"Tattoos on This Town"	Jason Aldean
2012	"When I Get It"	Craig Campbell
2012	"Fly Over States"	Jason Aldean
2012	"Glass" (version T2)	Thompson Square
2012	"5-1-5-0"	Dierks Bentley
2012	"How Country Feels"	Randy Houser
2012	"Musta Had a Good Time"	Parmalee
2012	"Tip It On Back"	Dierks Bentley
2012	"She Cranks My Tractor"	Dustin Lynch
2013	"1994"	Jason Aldean
2013	"Better I Don't"	Chris Janson
2013	"Runnin' Outta Moonlight"	Randy Houser
2013	"Pieces"	Gary Allan
2013	"Night Train"	Jason Aldean
2013	"I Hold On"	Dierks Bentley
2013	"101 Proof"	Colton James
2014	"Goodnight Kiss"	Randy Houser
2014	"I Wish I Could Break Your Heart"	Cassadee Pope
2014	"Drunk on a Plane"	Dierks Bentley
2014	"Yeah"	Joe Nichols
2014	"Song About a Girl"	Eric Paslay
2014	"Close Your Eyes"	Parmalee
2014	"Burnin' It Down"	Jason Aldean
2014	"Say You Do"	Dierks Bentley
2014	"Take It On Back"	Chase Bryant
2015	"She Don't Love You"	Eric Paslay
2015	"Country"	Mo Pitney
2015	"Trans Am"	Thompson Square
2015	"Riser"	Dierks Bentley
2015	"Boy & a Girl Thing"	Mo Pitney
2016	"Humble and Kind"	Tim McGraw
2016	"Somewhere on a Beach"	Dierks Bentley
2016	"High Class"	Eric Paslay
2016	"I'll Be the Moon"	Dierks Bentley
2016	"What the Hell Did I Say"	Dierks Bentley
2016	"Pick Up"	Dierks Bentley
2016	"Black"	Dierks Bentley
2016	"Different for Girls"	Dierks Bentley with Elle King
2016	"Suitcase"	Steve Moakler
2017	"Getaway"	Hunter Brothers
2017	"It Ain't My Fault" (co:director: Ryan Silver)	Brothers Osborne
2017	"Hold the Light"	Dierks Bentley
2017	"Momma and Jesus"	Tucker Beathard
2018	"Shoot Me Straight" (co:director Ryan Silver)	Brothers Osborne
2018	"Woman, Amen"	Dierks Bentley
2018	"Most People Are Good"	Luke Bryan
2018	"Burning Man"	Dierks Bentley with Brothers Osborne

== Awards ==
Year	Video	Artist	Category	Result
2007	"Amarillo Sky"	Jason Aldean	ACM Music Video of The Year	Nominated
2007	"Amarillo Sky"	Jason Aldean	CMT Best Music Video	Nominated
2007	"Amarillo Sky"	Jason Aldean	CMT Music Video Director of The Year	Nominated
2010	"Are You Gonna Kiss Me Or Not"	Thompson Square	CMT Best Duo Video	Nominated
2010	"Are You Gonna Kiss Me Or Not"	Thompson Square	CMT Breakthrough Video	Nominated
2011	"I Got You"	Thompson Square	CMT Best Duo Video	Won
2014	"Drunk On A Plane"	Dierks Bentley	CMA Video of The Year	Won
2014	"Drunk On A Plane"	Dierks Bentley	ACM Video of The Year	Won
2015	"Humble And Kind"	Tim McGraw	CMT Music Video of The Year	Won
2015	"Humble And Kind"	Tim McGraw	CMA Video of The Year	Nominated
2017	"Aint My Fault"	Brothers Osborne	CMA Video Of The Year	Won
2017	"Aint My Fault"	Brothers Osborne	ACM Video of The Year	Won
2017	"Different For Girls"	Dierks Bentley feat. Elle King	CMT Video of The Year	Nominated
2017	"Different For Girls"	Dierks Bentley feat. Elle King	CMT Collaborative Video of The Year	Nominated
