= What the Hell Did I Say =

Single by Dierks Bentley

from the album Black
- Released: June 26, 2017
- Recorded: 2015–16
- Genre: Country
- Length: 3:28
- Label: Capitol Nashville
- Songwriters: Dierks Bentley; Josh Kear; Chris Tompkins
- Producer: Ross Copperman

Dierks Bentley singles chronology
| "Black" (2016) | "What the Hell Did I Say" (2017) | "Woman, Amen" (2018) |

"What the Hell Did I Say" is a song co-written and recorded by country music artist Dierks Bentley. It was released in June 2017 as the fourth single from his 2016 album Black. This is the second collaboration by Bentley, Kear and Tompkins, following the highly successful No. 1 single "Drunk on a Plane". However, unlike "Drunk", this song underperformed and missed the top 40 of the Billboard Country Airplay chart.

== Content ==
The protagonist's ex is calling to inform him she is coming to see him, after hearing something he said the previous evening when he was drunk at the bar and decided to call her. He is struggling to recall what exactly he said, for example promising to buy her a diamond ring and take her to Las Vegas to get married.

== Music video ==
A promotional video directed by Wes Edwards premiered on April 29, 2016 as part of the album's pre-release video series. The official music video was released on July 9, 2017. Also directed by Edwards, the video is composed of footage from Bentley's 2017 tour.

== Charts ==
| Chart (2016–17) | Peak position |
|---|---|
| US Country Airplay (Billboard) | 46 |
| US Hot Country Songs (Billboard) | 35 |

== Release history ==
| Region | Date | Format | Label | Ref. |
|---|---|---|---|---|
| United States | May 27, 2016 | Digital download | Capitol Nashville | |
| United States | June 26, 2017 | Country radio | Capitol Nashville | |
