= Black (Dierks Bentley song) =

Single by Dierks Bentley

from the album Black
- Released: November 14, 2016
- Recorded: 2015–16
- Genre: Country pop
- Length: 3:30
- Label: Capitol Nashville
- Songwriters: Dierks Bentley; Ross Copperman; Ashley Gorley
- Producer: Ross Copperman

Dierks Bentley singles chronology
"Different for Girls" (2016)	"Black" (2016)	"What the Hell Did I Say" (2017)

"Black" is the title track from Dierks Bentley's album of the same name. It was sent to country radio on November 14, 2016, as the third single from the album. The song was written by Bentley, Ross Copperman and Ashley Gorley. "Black" peaked at numbers two and four on both the Billboard Country Airplay and Hot Country Songs charts respectively. It also reached number 56 on the Billboard Hot 100 chart. It was certified 2× platinum by the Recording Industry Association of America (RIAA), and has sold 279,000 units in the United States as of May 2017. The song also charted in Canada, reaching number eight on the Country chart and number 74 on the Canadian Hot 100. The accompanying music video for the single, directed by Wes Edwards, was shot outside of Reykjavík, Iceland and featured Bentley's wife Cassidy.

== Tracklist ==
Dave Aude Remix Single

1. "Black" (Dave Aude Remix) - 4:03

== Music video ==
A promotional video directed by Wes Edwards premiered on April 29, 2016 as part of the album's pre-release video series. The official music video was released on January 13, 2017. Taking place outside Reykjavík, Iceland, the video follows Bentley on a deserted beach near some plane wreckage, his eyes spotting a woman in a black dress (played by Bentley's wife Cassidy) who leads him into a cave for some "sexy scenes".

== Commercial performance ==
On the week of February 4, 2017, "Black" debuted at number 98 on the Billboard Hot 100 and moved eight spots to number 90 the next week before leaving the chart. It reappeared at number 92 the week of March 4 and left two weeks later, but made its third reappearance at number 88 the week of April 1. It peaked at number 56 for two consecutive weeks and remained on the chart for nineteen weeks. The single was certified platinum by the RIAA in the US on June 3, 2021 for combined sales and streams of over a million units. As of May 2017, "Black" has sold 279,000 copies domestically. It reached number one on the Mediabase country radio singles chart in late May 2017.

In Canada, the track debuted at number 95 on the Canadian Hot 100 the same week it first appeared on the Billboard Hot 100. Three weeks later, it peaked at number 74 the week of February 25, and stayed on the chart for eight weeks.

== Live performance ==
On April 2, 2017, Bentley performed "Black" at the 52nd Academy of Country Music Awards, wearing a white t-shirt and blue jeans while performing with his guitar under a "single white spotlight".

== Charts ==
Chart (2016–2017)	Peak position
Canada Hot 100 (Billboard)	74
Canada Country (Billboard)	8
US Billboard Hot 100	56
US Country Airplay (Billboard)	2
US Hot Country Songs (Billboard)	4

=== Year-end charts ===
Chart (2017)	Position
Canada Country (Billboard)	6
US Country Airplay (Billboard)	20
US Hot Country Songs (Billboard)	18

== Certifications ==
Region	Certification	Certified units/sales
United States (RIAA)	2× Platinum	2,000,000 / 279,000

== Release history ==
Region	Date	Format	Label	Ref.
United States	May 27, 2016	Digital download	Capitol Nashville	
United States	November 14, 2016	Country radio	Capitol Nashville	
