= Bourbon in Kentucky =

Single by Dierks Bentley

from the album Riser
- Released: June 10, 2013
- Recorded: 2013
- Genre: Country
- Length: 3:45
- Label: Capitol Nashville
- Songwriters: Ryan Tyndell; Hillary Lindsey; Gordie Sampson
- Producer: Ross Copperman

Dierks Bentley singles chronology
"Tip It On Back" (2012)	"Bourbon in Kentucky" (2013)	"I Hold On" (2013)

"Bourbon in Kentucky" is a song written by Ryan Tyndell, Hillary Lindsey, and Gordie Sampson, and recorded by American country music artist Dierks Bentley with backing vocals by Kacey Musgraves. It is the first single from his seventh studio album, Riser. The song peaked at #45 on Country Airplay six weeks after its release date, becoming Bentley's lowest charting single at the time. He later spoke on the song's disappointing performance while promoting the album release, stating that it "bombed" and that "we knew" it was a big risk releasing a dark song as the first single in the summertime, but he was happy with the great reception it got from his core fanbase.

== Content ==
The song is about a man who consumes bourbon whiskey when heartbroken, but claims that there "ain't enough bourbon in Kentucky for me to forget you." It features a backing vocal from Kacey Musgraves.

Bentley told Great American Country, "I’ve never heard anything like 'Bourbon' before...I really love the angst of it. I've been there before where you can't drink your way through a heartache or a broken heart. There's such an aggressive lonesomeness in this song."

== Critical reception ==
Jon Freeman of Country Weekly gave the song an "A", comparing its production to both U2 and Bentley's late 2011-early 2012 single "Home". He also praised the lyric as "a tried-but-true drinkin’ and cryin’ lyric for something that manages to sound modern without feeling uncomfortably shoehorned in there." Matt Bjorke of Roughstock also compared the production style to U2, and said that "The melody is appropriately moody as it matches the lyrics about a man who doesn't have any way of getting over and past a relationship, as he's clearly lost without the love of his life." Giving it 4 stars out of 5, Billy Dukes of Taste of Country said that "Lyrically, ‘Bourbon in Kentucky’ breaks no new ground, but the atmosphere created in studio is like nothing released to country radio before."

== Music video ==
When the song was released in June 2013, a music video for it was filmed and it had to be released later on. The single slid quickly off the charts, with the label promoting Bentley's next single, 'I Hold On'. The music video remained unreleased until it premiered in February 2014 as 'Bourbon in Kentucky - The Lost Video. It was directed by Ryan Pallotta.

== Chart performance ==
The song debuted at #56 on Country Airplay the week of its release. After a slow climb, it peaked at #45 on its sixth week on the chart, before dropping to #48 and then falling down the charts, becoming Bentley's lowest-charting single until 2017's "What the Hell Did I Say".

Chart (2013)	Peak position
US Hot Country Songs (Billboard)	40
US Country Airplay (Billboard)	45
