= Different for Girls (song) =

Single by Dierks Bentley featuring Elle King

from the album Black
- Released: June 6, 2016
- Recorded: 2016
- Genre: Country
- Length: 3:00
- Label: Capitol Nashville
- Songwriter(s): J. T. Harding; Shane McAnally
- Producer(s): Ross Copperman

Dierks Bentley singles chronology
"Somewhere on a Beach" (2016)	"Different for Girls" (2016)	"Black" (2016)

Elle King singles chronology
"America's Sweetheart" (2016)	"Different for Girls" (2016)	"Good Girls" (2016)

"Different for Girls" is a song written by Shane McAnally and J. T. Harding and recorded by American country music artist Dierks Bentley featuring American singer-songwriter Elle King as a duet. It was released to country radio on June 6, 2016 as the second single from Bentley's eighth studio album Black (2016). The song won "Vocal Event of the Year" at the 2016 CMA Awards and was nominated for the 2017 Grammy Award for Best Country Duo/Group Performance. "Different for Girls" became Bentley's fifteenth number-one hit on the U.S. Billboard Country Airplay chart and his fifth Top 5 hit on the U.S. Hot Country Songs chart with a peak at number three. It also charted at number 42 on the Billboard Hot 100. The accompanying music video for the song was directed by Wes Edwards.

== Background ==
In the key of E major, Bentley stated that he found "a real honesty in the lyrics" and that "the differences in how guys and girls deal with a broken heart is really interesting material to me. Having two daughters certainly has changed the way I see the world and what they have ahead."

== Commercial performance ==
The song reached number 3 on the Hot Country Songs chart where it stayed for three weeks, and it is Bentley's 20th song to reach the top 10 on the chart. It also topped the chart on Country Airplay. It was certified Gold by the RIAA on September 16, 2016. The song had sold 460,000 copies in the US as of January 2017. It achieved similar chart success in Canada, becoming Bentley's second number-one hit on the Canadian Country charts and peaking within the Top 50 of the Canadian Hot 100 at number 49. The song is certified double platinum by the Recording Industry Association of America (RIAA) as of 2022.

== Track listing ==
Digital download
No.	Title	Length
1.	"Different for Girls" (featuring Elle King)	3:00

== Music video ==
The music video was directed by Wes Edwards and premiered in July 2016. It explores the ways in which a man and woman deal with their breakup as depicted in the lyrics. The man prepares for a night out at the bar with his friends, where he attempts to pick up a new woman, only to get thrown out of the bar after getting into a fight with her boyfriend. Meanwhile, the woman is crying in her bed attempting to text her ex until one of her friends invites her to go out. By the end of the video, it is the man who falls apart trying to send a text, while the woman ignores it, having moved on at that point.

== Charts ==
=== Weekly charts ===
Chart (2016)	Peak position
Canada (Canadian Hot 100)	49
Canada Country (Billboard)	1
US Billboard Hot 100	42
US Country Airplay (Billboard)	1
US Hot Country Songs (Billboard)	3

=== Year end charts ===
Chart (2016)	Position
US Country Airplay (Billboard)	45
US Hot Country Songs (Billboard)	15

== Certifications and sales ==
Region	Certification	Certified units/sales
Canada (Music Canada)	Platinum	80,000^{‡}
United States (RIAA)	2× Platinum	2,000,000^{‡} / 460,000
^{‡} Sales+streaming figures based on certification alone.

== Release history ==
Region	Date	Format	Label	Ref.
United States	May 27, 2016	Digital download	Capitol Nashville	
United States	June 6, 2016	Country radio	Capitol Nashville	
