= Somewhere on a Beach =

Single by Dierks Bentley

from the album Black
- Released: January 18, 2016
- Recorded: 2015–16
- Genre: Country
- Length: 3:17
- Label: Capitol Nashville
- Songwriters: Michael Tyler; Jaron Boyer; Alexander Palmer; Dave Kuncio; Josh Mirenda
- Producer: Ross Copperman

Dierks Bentley singles chronology
| "Riser" (2015) | "Somewhere on a Beach" (2016) | "Different for Girls" (2016) |

"Somewhere on a Beach" is a song recorded by American country music artist Dierks Bentley. It was released for digital download on January 18, 2016, and to country radio on January 25, 2016, as the lead single from his eighth studio album, Black. The song was written by Michael Tyler, Jaron Boyer, Alexander Palmer, Dave Kuncio and Josh Mirenda.

"Somewhere on a Beach" reached number one on the U.S. Billboard Country Airplay chart, giving Bentley his fourteenth number-one hit on the U.S. country music chart. It also gave him his first number-one hit on the Hot Country Songs chart since 2012's "5-1-5-0", and his ninth top 40 hit on the Billboard Hot 100 with a peak at number 35. The song was certified 2× Platinum by the Recording Industry Association of America (RIAA), denoting sales of over two million units in the United States. Its chart success in Canada was similarly received, as it peaked at number one on the Country chart and number 59 on the Canadian Hot 100. It also garnered a Platinum certification from Music Canada for selling over 80,000 units in that country.

The accompanying music video for the song was directed by Wes Edwards.

== Content ==
"Somewhere on a Beach" is a song in which the narrator is talking to his ex-girlfriend about his life after they broke up. He tells her that he has a new girlfriend and adds that she and he are having fun together "somewhere on a beach".

The song has been compared to Bentley's previous hits "Drunk on a Plane" (2014) and "How Am I Doin'" (2004).

== Reception ==
=== Critical ===
The website, Taste of Country, gave the song a positive review, saying it is "fair to call the soulful country-blues song a sequel to “Drunk On a Plane”: "Somewhere on a Beach" details what happens once that plane lands". It also compared the song's atmosphere favorably to Kenny Chesney's musical style.

=== Commercial ===
The song debuted at numbers 26 and 29, respectively, on the U.S. Billboard Hot Country Songs and Country Airplay charts during its first week, selling over 19,000 copies in the United States. In its second week, it rose to No. 20 on Hot Country Songs, and entered the Billboard Hot 100 at number 98, with an additional 22,000 copies sold. The song became Bentley's eleventh number one hit on the Hot Country Songs chart in April 2016. It also peaked at number 35 on the Hot 100 that same week. As of August 2016, the song has sold 640,000 copies in the US.

== Music video ==
The music video was directed by Wes Edwards and premiered in February 2016. Filmed in a seaside fishing village in Puerto Moreles, Mexico, it continues the story of one of the passengers from "Drunk on a Plane" (which Edwards also directed), played by Josh Hoover. It begins as the plane from "Drunk" lands, and Josh is seen getting off (still with his neck pillow on) and meeting a sexy girl at a bar after drinking, then waking up the next morning intoxicated and unaware of what happened the previous day. He and the girl are then seen swimming in a hotel pool together and he is seen giving her a massage on the beach and with her in a lounge chair at the same beach. They are then rescued by a lifeguard before sharing an ice cream cone and getting massaged together (he is seen in a head covering). The final scene shows him throwing a bottle of pills into a campfire at night, with her by his side. Dierks is seen performing the song in 3 locations throughout: at a seaside bar, in an alleyway at night with 2 of his band members, and at a concert.

== Personnel ==
- Dierks Bentley – lead vocals
- Ross Copperman – acoustic guitar, electric guitar, keyboards, programming, background vocals
- Jedd Hughes – electric guitar
- Tony Lucido – bass guitar
- Danny Rader – bouzouki, acoustic guitar, electric guitar, keyboards, programming
- Aaron Sterling – drums, percussion
- Bryan Sutton – acoustic guitar

== Charts and certifications ==
=== Charts ===
| Chart (2016) | Peak position |
|---|---|
| Canada Hot 100 (Billboard) | 59 |
| Canada Country (Billboard) | 1 |
| US Billboard Hot 100 | 35 |
| US Country Airplay (Billboard) | 1 |
| US Hot Country Songs (Billboard) | 1 |

=== Year end charts ===
| Chart (2016) | Position |
|---|---|
| US Country Airplay (Billboard) | 9 |
| US Hot Country Songs (Billboard) | 4 |

=== Certifications ===
| Region | Certification | Certified units/sales |
|---|---|---|
| Canada (Music Canada) | Platinum | 80,000^{‡} |
| United States (RIAA) | 3× Platinum | 3,000,000^{‡} |
^{‡} Sales+streaming figures based on certification alone.

== Release history ==
List of release dates, showing region, release format, label catalog number, and reference
| Region | Date | Format(s) | Label | Ref |
|---|---|---|---|---|
| United States | January 18, 2016 | Digital download | Capitol Nashville | |
| United States | January 25, 2016 | Digital download | Country radio | |
