= The Dirt Drifters =

American country music group

- Origin: Nashville, Tennessee, U.S.
- Genres: Country
- Years active: 2010–2012
- Labels: Warner Bros.
- Members: Matt Fleener; Ryan Fleener; Jeff Middleton; Jeremy Little; Nick Diamond

The Dirt Drifters was an American country music group made up of five musicians: lead singer/guitarist Matt Fleener, vocalist/guitarist Ryan Fleener, vocalist/guitarist Jeff Middleton, bassist Jeremy Little and drummer Nick Diamond. They were signed to Warner Bros. Records and their debut CD, This Is My Blood, was released on July 19, 2011.

Their debut single, "Something Better," was released in February 2011.

== Discography ==
=== Albums ===
| Title | Album details | Peak chart positions | |
| Title | Album details | US Country | US Heat |
|---|---|---|---|
| This Is My Blood | Release date: July 19, 2011; Label: Warner Bros. Records | 57 | 32 |

=== Singles ===
| Year | Single | Peak positions | Album |
| Year | Single | US Country | Album |
|---|---|---|---|
| 2011 | "Something Better" | 48 | This Is My Blood |
| 2011 | "Always a Reason" | — | This Is My Blood |
| 2012 | "There She Goes" | — | This Is My Blood |
"—" denotes releases that did not chart

=== Music videos ===
| Year | Video | Director |
|---|---|---|
| 2011 | "Something Better" | Wes Edwards |
| 2011 | "Always a Reason" | Andi Zack |
