= Home (Dierks Bentley album) =

Studio album by Dierks Bentley
- Released: February 7, 2012
- Recorded: February 2011
- Genre: Country
- Length: 44:32
- Label: Capitol Nashville
- Producer: Brett Beavers (all tracks except 1); Jon Randall (track 1); Luke Wooten (all tracks except 1)

Dierks Bentley chronology
Up on the Ridge (2010)	Home (2012)	Riser (2014)

Singles from Home
- 1. "Am I the Only One" Released: March 21, 2011; 2. "Home" Released: October 10, 2011; 3. "5-1-5-0" Released: April 9, 2012; 4. "Tip It On Back" Released: August 20, 2012

Professional ratings
Review scores
Source	Rating
Allmusic	3/5 stars

Home is the sixth studio album by American country music artist Dierks Bentley. It was released on February 7, 2012 by Capitol Records Nashville. The album produced four singles—"Am I the Only One", the "title track", "5-1-5-0", and "Tip It On Back"—on the US Billboard Hot Country Songs chart between 2011 and 2012, with the first three of those reaching number one.

== Critical reception ==
AllMusic's Stephen Thomas Erlewine gave the album a positive review and rated it as three stars out of five, saying that it "resonates longer and louder than Feel That Fire even when it shares much of the same radio-ready DNA." In 2017, Billboard contributor Chuck Dauphin placed one track from the album on his top 10 list of Bentley's best songs: "Am I the Only One" at number nine.

== Chart performance ==
The album debuted at number seven with 55,000 copies on the US Billboard 200 chart. As of February 2014, the album has sold 294,000 copies in the United States.

== Track listing ==
No.	Title	Writer(s)	Length
1.	"Am I the Only One"	Dierks Bentley, Jim Beavers, Jon Randall	3:11
2.	"Gonna Die Young"	Jason Delkou, Eric Paslay, Bruce Wallace	2:55
3.	"Tip It On Back"	Ross Copperman, Jon Nite, Tully Kennedy	3:26
4.	"Home"	Bentley, Brett Beavers, Dan Wilson	3:58
5.	"Diamonds Make Babies"	J. Beavers, Lee Thomas Miller, Chris Stapleton	3:23
6.	"In My Head"	Marv Green, Paul Jenkins, Jason Sellers	3:34
7.	"Breathe You In"	Bentley, Marty Dodson, Ryan Tyndell	3:47
8.	"The Woods"	Bentley, Randall, Jaren Johnston	3:15
9.	"When You Gonna Come Around" (with Karen Fairchild)	Jamie Hartford, Gary Nicholson	3:26
10.	"5-1-5-0"	Bentley, B. Beavers, J. Beavers	3:02
11.	"Heart of a Lonely Girl"	Travis Howard, Charlie Worsham	3:34
12.	"Thinking of You"	Bentley, J. Beavers	7:01
Total length:			44:32

Best Buy Bonus Tracks
No.	Title	Length
13.	"Cold Cans"	3:33
14.	"Line #7"	4:19

== Personnel ==
Credits adapted from Allmusic and album liner notes.

Technical and production

- Luke Wooten - engineer, mixing, producer
- Gary Paczosa - engineer, mixing
- Brandon Bell - engineer, assistant
- Brett Beavers - producer
- Jon Randall - producer
- Kyle Manner - digital editing
- Andrew Mendelson - mastering
- Hank Williams - mastering
- Production assistant - Greg Mangum, Scott Johnson

Design

- Art direction - Joanna Carter
- Art producer - Michelle Hall
- Assistants - Jon Ashley, Jeremy Brown, Evan Bradford, Leslie Richter
- Design - Glen Nakasako
- Photography - James Minchin III, Ryan Silver

Musicians

- Accordion - Mike Rojas
- Acoustic guitar - Bryan Sutton, Jaren Johnston, Brett Beavers, Jim Beavers, Steven Sheehan, Jedd Hughes
- Banjo - Bryan Sutton
- Bass guitar - Jimmy Carter, Michael Rhodes
- Dobro - Randy Kohrs
- Drums - Steve Brewster, Shannon Forrest
- Programming - Brett Beavers
- Electric guitar - Luke Wooten, Jedd Hughes, Tom Bukovac, J. T. Corenflos, Kenny Greenberg, Rob McNelley
- Fiddle - Sam Bush, Larry Franklin, Andy Leftwich
- Guitjo - Bryan Sutton
- Mandolin - Andy Leftwich, Bryan Sutton, Tim O'Brien
- Pedal steel guitar - Gary Morse, Scotty Sanders, Dan Dugmore
- Percussion - Jaren Johnston, Steve Brewster, Eric Darken
- Piano - Mike Rojas
- Lead Vocals - Dierks Bentley
- Duet Vocals - Karen Fairchild on "When You Gonna Come Around"
- Background Vocalists - Jaren Johnston, Jon Randall, Chris Stapleton, Evie Bentley, Caylin Cervetti, Perry Coleman, Morgane Hayes, Lona Heins, Russell Terrell

== Charts ==
=== Weekly charts ===
Chart (2012)	Peak position
Australian Country Albums (ARIA)	7
Canadian Albums (Billboard)	12
US Billboard 200	7
US Top Country Albums (Billboard)	1

=== Year-end charts ===
Chart (2012)	Position
US Billboard 200	135
US Top Country Albums (Billboard)	28

Chart (2013)	Position
US Top Country Albums (Billboard)	66

== Certifications ==
Region	Certification	Certified units/sales
United States (RIAA)	Gold	500,000^{‡}
^{‡} Sales+streaming figures based on certification alone.
