= Marlee Scott =

- Born: January 1, 1986 (age 39); Richmond Hill, Ontario, Canada
- Origin: St. Albert, Alberta, Canada
- Genres: Country
- Occupation: Singer
- Years active: 2005–present
- Labels: 306 Records, Big Ride Entertainment
- Website: www.marleescott.com

Marlee Scott (born January 1, 1986, in Richmond Hill, Ontario) is a Canadian country music singer and songwriter. She now resides in Nashville, Tennessee. In 2004, Scott was the winner of Corus Entertainment's Rising Country Superstar Challenge, which led to a record deal with 306 Records and the release of her first album, Souvenir, in 2005. That album saw four singles released to country radio, and her video for "I Fall in Love Too Fast" received airplay on CMT.

Scott signed a new management deal with Big Ride Management in February 2008. Big Ride Management is headed by Gerry Leiske, who previously managed Emerson Drive, and is based in Nashville, Tennessee. She released a new, self-titled album in November 2008, on independent record label Big Ride Entertainment.

== Discography ==
=== Albums ===
| Title | Details |
|---|---|
| Souvenir | Release date: October 18, 2005; Label: 306 Records |
| Marlee Scott | Release date: November 11, 2008; Label: Big Ride Entertainment |
| Beautiful Maybe | Release date: June 19, 2012; Label: Big Ride Entertainment |

=== Singles ===
| Year | Single | Peak positions | Album |
| Year | Single | CAN Country | Album |
|---|---|---|---|
| 2005 | "I Fall in Love Too Fast" | — | Souvenir |
| 2006 | "We'll Think of Something" | — | Souvenir |
| 2006 | "My Only Souvenir" | — | Souvenir |
| 2007 | "Track 3" | — | Souvenir |
| 2009 | "Fight with You" | — | Marlee Scott |
| 2009 | "Yesterday, Today and Tomorrow" | 26 | Marlee Scott |
| 2010 | "5 O'Clock Dance" | — | Marlee Scott |
| 2010 | "Here to Heaven" | 42 | — |
| 2011 | "Beautiful Maybe" | 15 | Beautiful Maybe |
| 2012 | "Train Wreck" (with Vince Gill) | 34 | Beautiful Maybe |
| 2012 | "Life Is Not a Movie" | 25 | Beautiful Maybe |
| 2013 | "Planet of Your Own" | — | Beautiful Maybe |

=== Music videos ===
| Year | Title | Director |
|---|---|---|
| 2005 | "I Fall in Love Too Fast" | |
| 2010 | "Here to Heaven" | Stephano Barberis |
| 2011 | "Beautiful Maybe" | Wes Edwards |
| 2012 | "Train Wreck" | Roman White |

== Awards and nominations ==
| Year | Association | Category | Result |
|---|---|---|---|
| 2010 | Canadian Country Music Association | Rising Star | Nominated |
