= Steve Moakler =

American singer-songwriter

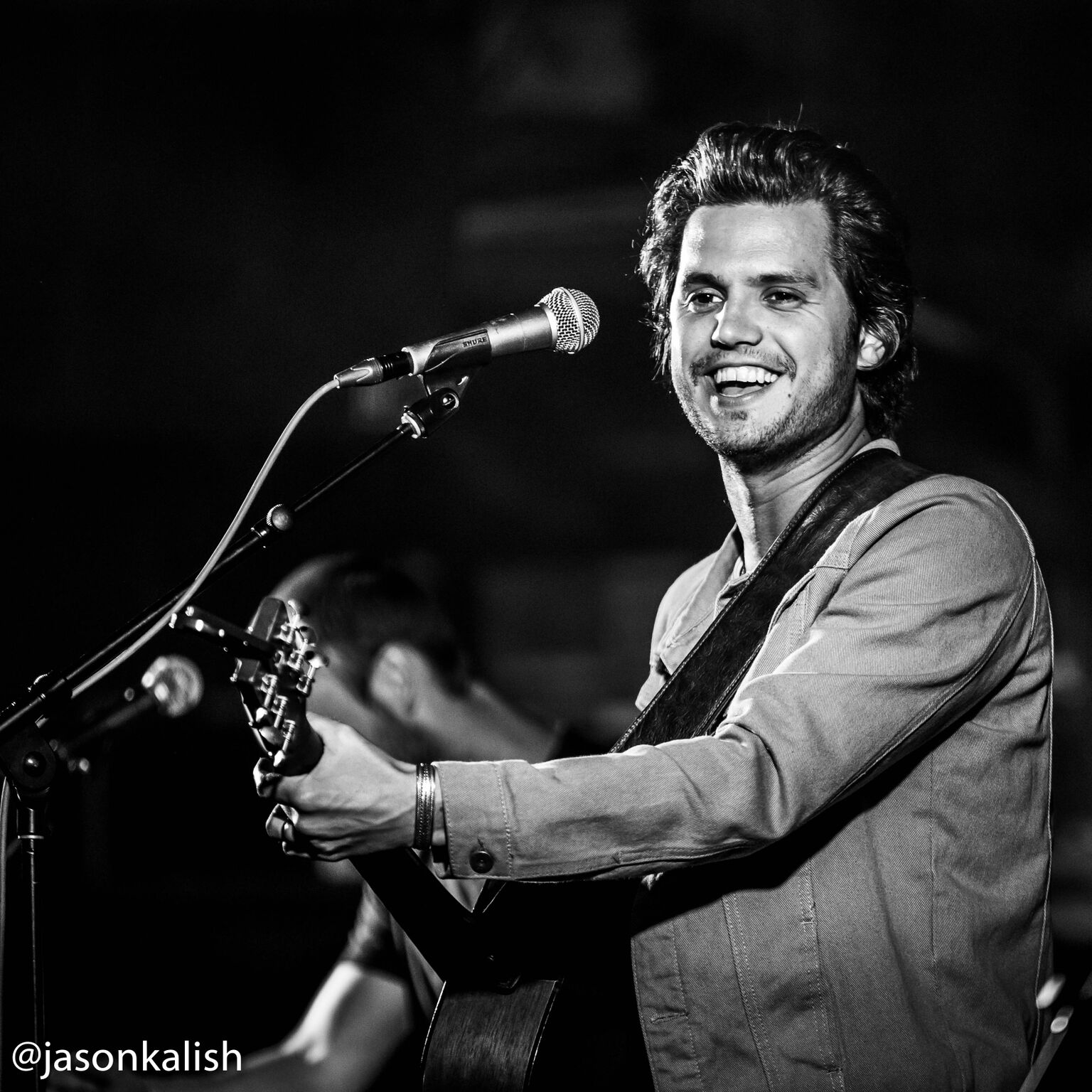

Background information
- Born: New Jersey, U.S.
- Origin: Bethel Park, Pennsylvania, U.S.
- Genres: Country
- Label: Creative Nation
- Website: www.stevemoakler.com

Steve Moakler is an American country musician and songwriter from Bethel Park, Pennsylvania, now based in Nashville, Tennessee. He has released five studio albums and has written songs for Nashville recording artists including Dierks Bentley's single "Riser."

== Early life ==
His mother was a nurse and his father an architect. His father's stereo and record collection inspired Moakler, who started playing guitar and writing songs at age 14, and forming his first band in middle school. He played throughout Pittsburgh during his high school years. He graduated from Bethel Park High School in 2006 and turned down an independent record deal to move to Nashville.

Moakler attended Belmont University in Nashville, taking classes during the week and playing shows on the weekends. After two years he left school to focus full-time on his music career.

== Career ==
After moving to Nashville, Moakler began co-writing with songwriters such as Gordie Sampson, Barry Dean, and Luke Laird. He co-wrote Dierks Bentley's 2015 single "Riser," which Bentley states he built his album around. Moakler's songs have also been recorded by Reba McEntire, Ashley Monroe, Jake Owen, Ben Rector, and others.

As a performer and recording artist, Moakler's work has been praised by Rolling Stone Country as "thoughtful singer-songwriter fare in the blue-collar vein." His first record, All the Faint Lights, was self-published. In 2011 he formed his own label, Free the Birds, and released two more albums independently, Watching Time Run and Wide Open. The label also used the money raised to combat sex trafficking. In 2014, Beth Laird of Creative Nation sought out Moakler and retained him under management. In 2016, he worked with Creative Nation producer Luke Laird on a self-titled EP, whose songs made up the first half of his 2017 album, Steel Town. Moakler says the latter album was inspired by his upbringing in Pittsburgh. It has been called a more personal album, as well as his "most country" album. The first single, "Suitcase," became his first radio hit and first music video. The second single was "Love Drunk," followed by a third single, "Wheels." Moakler released his fifth album, Born Ready, in 2018. The album has been critically acclaimed, with Bobby Moore praising its "pop gems that clear the barrier between Americana and the country charts."

Moakler has been named an artist to watch by numerous outlets, including Rolling Stone Country, Spotify, and Taste of Country. He has been heavily promoted by SiriusXM's senior director of programming J.R. Schumann on station “The Highway.” The station also had him open their inaugural “The Highway Finds Tour.” Moakler made his Grand Ole Opry debut on March 19, 2016. He opened for parts of Dan + Shay's "Obsessed Tour", Old Dominion's "Meat & Candy Tour", Willie Nelson's "God's Problem Child Tour", and Tim McGraw and Faith Hill's "Soul2Soul World Tour". Moakler toured in late 2017 and late 2018 on the "Hometowns and Campgrounds Tour," and he headlined in spring 2018 on the "Born Ready Tour."

Moakler's music has been featured in several movies, TV shows, and commercials. Two of Moakler's songs appeared in the movie October Baby, and two songs also featured in the Netflix show The Ranch. In 2017, Mack Trucks commissioned him to write and perform a song, “Born Ready,” for the release of their Anthem truck series.

== Discography ==
=== Studio albums ===
Title	Details	Peak chart positions			
Title	Details	US Heat	US Indie	US Country	US Folk
All the Faint Lights	Release date: March 30, 2009; Label: self-released	—	—	—	—
Watching Time Run	Release date: August 30, 2011; Label: Free the Birds	6	31	—	—
Wide Open	Release date: March 18, 2014; Label: Free the Birds	4	37	—	5
Steve Moakler: The Mix Tape	Release date: November 2015; Label: Creative Nation Music	—	—	—	—
Steve Moakler: The EP	Release Date: March 11, 2016; Label: Creative Nation Music	21	—	38	—
Steel Town	Release Date: March 17, 2017; Label: Soundly Music	—	—	—	—
Born Ready	Release Date: June 15, 2018; Label: Creative Nation Music	—	—	—	—
Blue Jeans	Release Date: January 17, 2020; Label: Creative Nation Music	—	—	—	—
Make A Little Room	Release Date: August 12, 2022; Label: Creative Nation Music	—	—	—	—

=== Music videos ===
Year	Title	Director
2016	"Suitcase"	Wes Edwards
2017	"Wheels"	Steve Boyle
2017	"Born Ready"	Mark Urmos
