= Black (Dierks Bentley album) =

Studio album by Dierks Bentley
- Released: May 27, 2016
- Genre: Country
- Length: 47:15
- Label: Capitol Records Nashville
- Producer: Ross Copperman

Dierks Bentley chronology
| Riser (2014) | Black (2016) | The Mountain (2018) |

Singles from Black
- 1. "Somewhere on a Beach" Released: January 18, 2016; 2. "Different for Girls" Released: June 6, 2016; 3. "Black" Released: November 14, 2016; 4. "What the Hell Did I Say" Released: June 26, 2017

Black is the eighth studio album by American country music artist Dierks Bentley. It was released on May 27, 2016, by Capitol Records Nashville. Bentley explained that this is a record about relationships, and follows the same person throughout the track listing going through them. The lead single, "Somewhere on a Beach", was released to radio on January 18, 2016. The album's second single, "Different for Girls" (featuring Elle King), was released to country radio on June 6, 2016. The album's title track was released to country radio as the third single on November 14, 2016. "What the Hell Did I Say" was sent to country radio as the album's fourth and final single June 26, 2017.

Black garnered positive reviews from critics, praising the blend of classic and modern country aesthetics and its exploration of mature themes. It debuted at number two on the Billboard 200, selling 101,000 equivalent album units and 88,000 copies in the first week.

== Summary ==
Bentley announced the album along with its first single "Somewhere on a Beach" on January 18, 2016, via his social media sites. The second single, "Different for Girls" featuring Elle King, was released on June 6, 2016. The third single, also the title track, was released on November 14, 2016. The fourth single, "What the Hell Did I Say", was released on June 26, 2017.

Bentley also released a series of promo videos for "I'll Be the Moon", "What the Hell Did I Say", "Pick Up" and "Black".

In a statement about the album, Bentley said that although it bears the maiden name of his wife Cassidy, it tells a universal tale of hookups, breakups, and everything in between, shining a light on the things that occur after the sun goes down. He also noted that "It's a relationship album that covers the ups and downs of the journey and ends with some self-realization and evolvement. The song 'Black' helps set all of that in motion at the top of the album by guiding you into the darkness and the shadows of the night. The same guy who sings 'Somewhere On a Beach' winds up growing and having enough perspective to sing something introspective like 'Different for Girls'. By the last song, he's taking a look back on love and life."

== Critical reception ==
Professional ratings
Review scores
| Source | Rating |
|---|---|
| AllMusic | 3.5/5 stars |
| Music Connection | 8/10 |
| Newsday | B+ |
| The Plain Dealer | A |
| Rolling Stone | 3.5/5 stars |

Indicating in a review by Rolling Stone, Stephen L. Betts says, "But what lifts Black past merely being a good concept album is an old-school musicality that never takes a backseat to modern-country conventionality." Stephen Thomas Erlewine, doing the review for AllMusic, describes, "It's mood music, sometimes playing as smooth as a seduction but better suited for moments of introspection when you're surrounded by a crowd and need to isolate." Reviewing the album from Newsday, Glenn Gamboa writes, "expertly weaving styles and storytelling tricks to build memorable tales to sing along with." Chuck Yarborough, giving a review of the album at The Plain Dealer, states, "It is a grownup album, with grownup themes, grownup lyrics and grownup performances, especially from Bentley with his pen and on the microphone." In 2017, Billboard contributor Chuck Dauphin placed two tracks from the album on his top 10 list of Bentley's best songs: the title track at number three and "Different for Girls" at number six.

== Commercial performance ==
The album debuted at number 2 on the Billboard 200 with 101,000 equivalent album units; it sold 88,000 copies in its first week. It was the best-selling album of the week. Black became Bentley's highest-charting album on the Billboard 200 and largest sales week. The album was certified Gold by the RIAA on February 22, 2017. The album has sold 276,400 copies in the US as of November 2017.

== Track listing ==
| No. | Title | Writer(s) | Length |
|---|---|---|---|
| 1. | "Black" | Dierks Bentley; Ross Copperman; Ashley Gorley | 3:30 |
| 2. | "Pick Up" | Andrew Dorff; Jaren Johnston; Jimmy Robbins | 3:34 |
| 3. | "I'll Be the Moon" (featuring Maren Morris) | Matt Dragstrem; Ryan Hurd; Heather Morgan | 3:30 |
| 4. | "What the Hell Did I Say" | Copperman; Josh Kear; Chris Tompkins | 3:27 |
| 5. | "Somewhere on a Beach" | Michael Tyler; Jaron Boyer; Alexander Palmer; Dave Kuncio; Josh Mirenda | 3:17 |
| 6. | "Freedom" | Bentley; Copperman; Gorley | 3:36 |
| 7. | "Why Do I Feel" | Bentley; Copperman; Dan Wilson | 3:59 |
| 8. | "Roses and a Time Machine" | Luke Dick; Adam James | 3:39 |
| 9. | "All the Way to Me" | Bentley; Dick; Scooter Carusoe | 3:39 |
| 10. | "Different for Girls" (featuring Elle King) | J. T. Harding; Shane McAnally | 3:00 |
| 11. | "Mardi Gras" (featuring Trombone Shorty) | Bentley; Natalie Hemby; Steve Moakler | 3:50 |
| 12. | "Light It Up" | Bentley; Copperman; Jessi Alexander | 3:36 |
| 13. | "Can't Be Replaced" | Bentley; Luke Laird; Hillary Lindsey | 5:38 |
| Total length: | | | 47:15 |

== Personnel ==
- Roy Agee – trombone
- Jessi Alexander – background vocals
- Sam Ashworth – background vocals
- Dierks Bentley – lead vocals
- Jeff Coffin – saxophone
- Ross Copperman – bass guitar, acoustic guitar, electric guitar, keyboards, programming, background vocals
- Luke Dick – acoustic guitar, electric guitar, programming, background vocals
- Jerry Douglas – dobro
- Dan Dugmore – electric guitar, pedal steel guitar
- Fred Eltringham – drums
- Mike Haynes – trumpet
- Natalie Hemby – background vocals
- Lee Hendricks – bass guitar
- Jedd Hughes – acoustic guitar, electric guitar
- Jaren Johnston – acoustic guitar, electric guitar, background vocals
- Elle King – duet vocals on "Different for Girls"
- Luke Laird – acoustic guitar, electric guitar, programming, background vocals
- Hillary Lindsey – background vocals
- Tony Lucido – bass guitar
- Maren Morris – harmony vocals on "I'll Be the Moon"
- Russ Pahl – pedal steel guitar
- Danny Rader – bouzouki, acoustic guitar, electric guitar, keyboards, programming, synthesizer
- Jimmy Robbins – programming
- Aaron Sterling – drums, percussion
- Bryan Sutton – acoustic guitar
- Trombone Shorty – trombone on "Mardi Gras"
- Micah Wilshire – background vocals
- Charlie Worsham – acoustic guitar, electric guitar
- Craig Wright – drums
- Jonathan Yudkin – string arrangements, strings

== Charts ==
=== Weekly charts ===
| Chart (2016) | Peak position |
|---|---|
| Australian Albums (ARIA) | 21 |
| Canadian Albums (Billboard) | 2 |
| UK Country Albums (OCC) | 1 |
| US Billboard 200 | 2 |
| US Top Country Albums (Billboard) | 1 |

=== Year-end charts ===
| Chart (2016) | Position |
|---|---|
| US Billboard 200 | 90 |
| Top Country Albums (Billboard) | 15 |
| Chart (2017) | Position |
| US Billboard 200 | 160 |
| Top Country Albums (Billboard) | 25 |

=== Singles ===
| Year | Single | Peak chart positions | | | | | Certifications (sales threshold) |
| Year | Single | US Country | US Country Airplay | US | CAN Country | CAN | Certifications (sales threshold) |
|---|---|---|---|---|---|---|---|
| 2016 | "Somewhere on a Beach" | 1 | 1 | 35 | 1 | 59 | US: 3× Platinum; CAN: Platinum |
| 2016 | "Different for Girls" | 3 | 1 | 42 | 1 | 49 | US: 2× Platinum; CAN: Platinum |
| 2016 | "Black" | 4 | 2 | 56 | 8 | 74 | US: 2× Platinum; CAN: Gold |
| 2017 | "What the Hell Did I Say" | 35 | 46 | — | — | — | |
"—" denotes releases that did not chart

== Certifications ==
| Region | Certification | Certified units/sales |
|---|---|---|
| United States (RIAA) | Platinum | 1,000,000^{‡} |
^{‡} Sales+streaming figures based on certification alone.

== Release history ==
List of release dates, showing region, formats, label, editions, and reference
| Region | Date | Format(s) | Label | Edition(s) | Ref |
|---|---|---|---|---|---|
| United Kingdom | May 27, 2016 | CD; digital download | Capitol Nashville | Standard | |
| United States | May 27, 2016 | CD; digital download | Capitol Nashville | Standard | |
| United States | August 12, 2016 | Vinyl | Capitol Nashville | Standard | |
