= Riser (song) =

Single by Dierks Bentley

from the album Riser
- Released: June 15, 2015
- Recorded: 2013–14
- Genre: Country
- Length: 4:10
- Label: Capitol Nashville
- Songwriters: Travis Meadows; Steve Moakler
- Producer: Ross Copperman

Dierks Bentley singles chronology
"Say You Do" (2014)	"Riser" (2015)	"Somewhere on a Beach" (2016)

"Riser" is a song recorded by American country music artist Dierks Bentley. It was released to radio on June 15, 2015 as the fifth and final single from his seventh studio album of the same name. The song was written by Travis Meadows and Steve Moakler.

== Commercial reception ==
The song debuted at No. 58 on the Country Airplay chart, and No. 49 on the Hot Country Songs chart in March 2014 on the album was released, selling 8,000 copies. It only re-entered the charts the following year in July 2015 after it was released as a single. It has sold 179,000 copies in the US as of January 2016.

== Music video ==
The music video was directed by Wes Edwards and premiered in September 2015.

== Charts performance ==
Chart (2015)	Peak position
Canada Country (Billboard)	43
US Bubbling Under Hot 100 (Billboard)	8
US Country Airplay (Billboard)	24
US Hot Country Songs (Billboard)	26

=== Year-end charts ===
Chart (2015)	Position
US Country Airplay (Billboard)	96
US Hot Country Songs (Billboard)	91

== Certifications ==
Region	Certification	Certified units/sales
United States (RIAA)	Gold	500,000^{‡}
^{‡} Sales+streaming figures based on certification alone.
