= Riser (album) =

Studio album by Dierks Bentley
- Released: February 25, 2014
- Genre: Country
- Length: 46:11
- Label: Capitol Records Nashville
- Producers: Ross Copperman (all tracks); Jaren Johnston (track 11)

Dierks Bentley chronology
Home (2012)	Riser (2014)	Black (2016)

Singles from Riser
- 1. "Bourbon in Kentucky" Released: June 10, 2013; 2. "I Hold On" Released: August 26, 2013; 3. "Drunk on a Plane" Released: April 21, 2014; 4. "Say You Do" Released: October 6, 2014; 5. "Riser" Released: June 15, 2015

Riser (stylized as RISER) is the seventh studio album by American country music artist Dierks Bentley. It was released on February 25, 2014 by Capitol Records Nashville. It was debuted at number 6 on the Billboard 200, becoming his seventh top ten album. The album was nominated for Best Country Album at the 57th Annual Grammy Awards.

== Content ==
The album includes the singles "Bourbon in Kentucky", "I Hold On", "Drunk on a Plane", "Say You Do", and the title track Riser. The first single peaked at number 45 on the Country Airplay chart, becoming Bentley's lowest-charting single to date at the time. The album was originally scheduled to be released in late 2013. The label decided to postpone the album's release date, and quickly began promoting the album's second single "I Hold On", which reached number 1 on Country Airplay. "Drunk on a Plane", the album's third single, became one of the biggest hits of his career, peaking at number 27 on the Billboard Hot 100. "Say You Do" served as the album's fourth single. The fifth single, also the title track, was released to radio on June 15, 2015.

Bentley told Roughstock that “You have one ear monitor in, one ear out, and the crowd’s there and your voice feels really great. There’s a certain amount of gravel to it because you’re tired, but you’re all jacked up on whatever you're drinking and adrenaline, and the crowds and the fans are there and there’s this feeling, fists in the air—it’s that thing that’s hard to transfer into a studio environment. There’s a rawness.”

== Critical reception ==
Professional ratings
Aggregate scores
Source	Rating
Metacritic	69/100
Review scores
Source	Rating
AllMusic	3.5/5 stars
Country Weekly	A
Got Country Online	4.5/5 stars
Nashville Country Club	4/5 stars
Rolling Stone	2.5/5 stars
Roughstock	4.5/5 stars
USA Today	4/4 stars

Riser garnered positive reception from eight music critics ratings and reviews. At Metacritic, they assign a "weighted average" score to selected independent ratings and reviews, and based upon six reviews the album has a Metascore of 70, which means the album received "generally favorable" reviews. Brian Mansfield of USA Today rated the album a perfect four stars, writing that "Grief over his dad's death infuses Riser so deeply that the emotions his loss triggered seep even into songs about girls", and observes this in how "Bentley bares his soul in meditations on love and loss, death and rebirth." At AllMusic, Stephen Thomas Erlewine rated the album three-and-a-half stars out of five, saying that because of the big issues dealt with on the album "it's no wonder that Riser doesn't quite feel brimming with lighthearted singles, but it's a sturdy, often absorbing record from a singer who is determined to be in it for the long haul." Sarah Rodman of The Boston Globe gave a positive review, noting how Bentley has a career that he's built on the "bedrock concepts that feel more quaint all the time: musicianship, emotional integrity, and hard work", which just happens that "Those elements again make themselves known on his stirring seventh album".

At Country Weekly, Jon Freeman graded the album an A, stating that the album is "leaps and bounds" from his first song and shows how Bentley grew as an artist "incrementally, in a way that feels effortless and natural." Dan MacIntosh of Roughstock rated the album four-and-a-half stars out of five, noting how "The quality of his songs speak for themselves" on the album, which he declares Bentley has "never been better." Yet, MacIntosh writes that "Riser may pass the emotional balancing test, but it’s nevertheless a few rungs short of content perfection." At Got Country Online, Tara Toro rated the "ballad heavy" album four-and-a-half stars out of five, calling it "an unhurried record" that is "full of reflective, emotional and mature songs"; and "Throughout the record, one hears Dierks’s gravelly vocals, perhaps at the best they have been, pouring emotions into every song." Nashville Country Club's Lisa Coleman rated the album four stars out of five, alluding to how the release "features an excellent track listing of songs of both intense and light hearted nature."

However, Jon Caramanica of The New York Times gave a mixed review of the release, indicating this is a "hit-or-miss album." At Rolling Stone, Andrew Dansby rated the album two-and-a-half stars out of five, noting that "Compared to what gets played on country radio, Dierks Bentley can almost sound like a traditionalist, with his hickory voice and songs about drinking"; however Bentley on Riser "devolves into a standard-issue world of bikinis and Bud Light."

In 2017, Billboard contributor Chuck Dauphin placed three tracks from the album on his top 10 list of Bentley's best songs: "I Hold On" at number one, "Drunk on a Plane" at number seven and "Bourbon in Kentucky" at number ten.

== Commercial performance ==
Riser debuted at number 6 on the Billboard 200 selling 63,000 copies in its opening week, becoming his seventh top ten album. It also debuted at No. 1 on Billboard's Top Country Albums chart, his fifth No. 1 on the chart. The album has sold 380,000 copies in the U.S. as of April 2016.

== Track listing ==
No.	Title	Writer(s)	Length
1.	"Bourbon in Kentucky"	Hillary Lindsey; Gordie Sampson; Ryan Tyndell	3:45
2.	"Say You Do"	Shane McAnally; Matthew Ramsey; Trevor Rosen	3:40
3.	"I Hold On"	Dierks Bentley; Brett James	4:40
4.	"Pretty Girls"	Bentley; Jon Randall; Jessi Alexander	3:39
5.	"Here on Earth"	Bentley; Tyndell; Ross Copperman	4:25
6.	"Drunk on a Plane"	Bentley; Chris Tompkins; Josh Kear	4:14
7.	"Five"	Bentley; Tyndell; Copperman	4:45
8.	"Riser"	Travis Meadows; Steve Moakler	4:10
9.	"Sounds of Summer"	Zach Crowell; Matt Jenkins; Adam Sanders	3:22
10.	"Damn These Dreams"	Bentley; Copperman; Jaren Johnston	3:25
11.	"Back Porch"	Lindsey; Cary Barlowe; Johnston	3:12
12.	"Hurt Somebody"	McAnally; Mark Nesler; Matt Fleener	2:54
Total length:			46:11

== Personnel ==
- Jessi Alexander – background vocals
- Sam Ashworth – background vocals
- Dierks Bentley – lead vocals
- Ross Copperman – acoustic guitar, electric guitar, keyboards, mandolin, programming, background vocals
- Dan Dugmore – dobro, acoustic guitar, electric guitar, pedal steel guitar
- Fred Eltringham – drums, percussion
- Kenny Greenberg – acoustic guitar, electric guitar
- Rob Hajacos – fiddle
- Lee Hendricks – bass guitar
- Mark Hill – bass guitar
- Dan Hochhalter – banjo, fiddle
- Jedd Hughes – electric guitar
- Jaren Johnston – banjo, acoustic guitar, background vocals
- Brian Layson – banjo, electric guitar, mandolin
- Jason Lehning – Hammond B-3 organ, keyboards, synthesizer
- Hillary Lindsey – background vocals
- Tony Lucido – bass guitar
- Kacey Musgraves – background vocals on "Bourbon in Kentucky"
- Jon Randall – background vocals
- Mickey Raphael – harmonica
- F. Reid Shippen – percussion
- Chris Stapleton – background vocals on "Hurt Somebody"
- Bryan Sutton – acoustic guitar, mandolin
- Ilya Toshinsky – banjo, acoustic guitar, electric guitar, mandolin
- Ryan Tyndell – electric guitar, keyboards, mandolin, percussion, background vocals
- Charlie Worsham – electric guitar, keyboards, mandolin, percussion, background vocals
- Craig Wright – drums, percussion
- Jonathan Yudkin – string arrangements, strings

== Charts ==
=== Weekly charts ===
Chart (2014–15)	Peak position
Canadian Albums (Billboard)	5
US Billboard 200	6
US Top Country Albums (Billboard)	1

=== Year-end charts ===
Chart (2014)	Position
US Billboard 200	65
US Top Country Albums (Billboard)	12
Chart (2015)	Position
US Billboard 200	160
US Top Country Albums (Billboard)	37

=== Singles ===
Year	Single	Peak chart positions					Certifications (sales threshold)
Year	Single	US Country	US Country Airplay	US	CAN Country	CAN	Certifications (sales threshold)
2013	"Bourbon in Kentucky"	40	45	—	—	—	
2013	"I Hold On"	3	1	40	2	44	US: 2× Platinum; CAN: Gold
2014	"Drunk on a Plane"	3	1	27	2	34	US: 3× Platinum; CAN: Platinum
2014	"Say You Do"	5	1	52	4	60	* US: Platinum
2015	"Riser"	26	24	108	43	—	
"—" denotes releases that did not chart

== Certifications ==
Region	Certification	Certified units/sales
United States (RIAA)	Platinum	1,000,000^{‡}
^{‡} Sales+streaming figures based on certification alone.
