= Am I the Only One (Dierks Bentley song) =

Single by Dierks Bentley

from the album Home
- Released: March 21, 2011
- Recorded: 2011
- Genre: Country rock
- Length: 3:11
- Label: Capitol Nashville
- Songwriters: Dierks Bentley; Jim Beavers; Jon Randall
- Producer: Jon Randall

Dierks Bentley singles chronology
"Draw Me a Map" (2010)	"Am I the Only One" (2011)	"Home" (2011)

"Am I the Only One" is a song co-written and recorded by American country music artist Dierks Bentley. It was released in March 2011 as the sixteenth single release of his career and the first from his 2012 album Home. The song reached number one on the U.S. Billboard Hot Country Songs chart in September 2011.

== Background and writing ==
Bentley told Billboard that, following his bluegrass album Up on the Ridge, he wanted to "be back on [radio] and I wanted my fans to hear our stuff. I wanted to come back with a song that was fun for fans and fun for country radio and fun for us to play every night." He co-wrote the song with Jon Randall, who produced Up on the Ridge, and Jim Beavers, who co-wrote Bentley's "Sideways". (Beavers' brother, Brett Beavers, produced all of Bentley's other albums.) Jim Beavers suggested the lyric "Am I the only one who wants to have fun tonight?", and the other two finished the song.

== Content ==
"Am I the Only One" is an up-tempo about a man who wants to party, but finds that his friends have other interests. In the chorus, the narrator asks, "Am I the only one who wants to have fun tonight?" The first verse includes the names of some of Bentley's actual friends.

This song is set in the key of A major and uses a basic three-chord structure. The first verse is A-E-A-E-A, while the second verse, which has a slightly different meter, uses A-E-A-D-E-A. The chorus uses the pattern A-D-E-A-D-E-A.

== Critical reception ==
Matt Bjorke of Roughstock rated the single four stars out of five, calling it a "light-hearted party anthem" and thought that its sound recalled Bentley's debut single, "What Was I Thinkin'". Kevin John Coyne of Country Universe gave it a B− grade, saying that he enjoys the "boozy lethargy, especially in Bentley’s performance– it’s like he really doesn’t give a damn about anything so long as he gets his party on." He states that compared to his single, "Up on the Ridge", the song falls a little less flat. In 2017, Billboard contributor Chuck Dauphin put "Am I the Only One" at number nine on his top 10 list of Bentley's best songs.

== Music video ==
The music video was directed by Deaton Flanigen and premiered in April 2011. His band members have acting roles in the music video. An NHL version of the music video was released and directed by Ryan Silver.

== Chart performance ==
Chart (2011)	Peak position
Canada Hot 100 (Billboard)	65
Canada Country (Billboard)	1
US Billboard Hot 100	39
US Hot Country Songs (Billboard)	1

=== Year-end charts ===
Chart (2011)	Position
US Country Songs (Billboard)	6

== Certifications ==
Region	Certification	Certified units/sales
Canada (Music Canada)	Gold	40,000^{*}
United States (RIAA)	Platinum	1,000,000^{‡}
^{*} Sales figures based on certification alone.^{‡} Sales+streaming figures based on certification alone.
