= Home (Dierks Bentley song) =

Single by Dierks Bentley

from the album Home
- Released: October 10, 2011
- Recorded: 2011
- Genre: Country
- Length: 3:58
- Label: Capitol Nashville
- Songwriters: Dan Wilson; Brett Beavers; Dierks Bentley
- Producers: Brett Beavers; Luke Wooten

Dierks Bentley singles chronology
"Am I the Only One" (2011)	"Home" (2011)	"5-1-5-0" (2012)

"Home" is a song co-written and recorded by American country music artist Dierks Bentley. It was released in October 2011 as the second single from his 2012 album of the same name. The song reached number one on the US Billboard Hot Country Songs chart in March 2012. Bentley co-wrote this song with Dan Wilson and Brett Beavers. The song was selected by the Arizona Centennial Commission to serve as its official song for the state's 100 year celebration.

== Background and writing ==
The song was inspired by the Tucson, Arizona shooting that killed six people and critically injured U.S. Representative Gabby Giffords in January 2011. Bentley told The Desert Sun that right after the shooting incident occurred, he was sitting with the song's two other writers, Dan Wilson and Brett Beavers and they were trying to make sense of the tragedy. He also points out that "the song's about a sense of being and memories of the country. Everybody's idea of America is a little different."

In January 2012, singer-songwriter Jason Isbell posted on Twitter that he thought Bentley plagiarized his song "In a Razor Town", which has a nearly identical melody. After Isbell tweeted that Bentley "brought that idea to the table", Bentley responded, "that is some funny shit!" Bentley also linked to an earlier interview with co-writer Dan Wilson discussing the writing of the song. Wilson indicated that it was a collaboration, as he and Brett Beavers developed the melody of the verses and Bentley came up with the hook of the chorus. On January 7, Isbell followed that he would not fight with Bentley over Twitter.

== Critical reception ==
Billy Dukes of Taste of Country gave the song three and a half stars out of five, saying that "[the] mood of ‘Home’ is unlike anything he's ever released to radio" but "after a couple of listens, the shock wears off and one can appreciate Bentley’s effort." Matt Bjorke of Roughstock gave the song five stars out of five, writing that "Dierks has kept the production ‘epic’ in scale and melody without ever succumbing to being too loud and too orchestral for some tastes." It also received a positive review in Billboard, whose Deborah Evans Price said that "The lyrics paint a picturesque portrait of our country's beauty and strength, while the melody wraps around the listener like an autumn sunset." She also praised the "understated" production and called Bentley a "dexterous" songwriter. Bentley's performance earned him a Grammy nomination for Best Country Solo Performance.

== Music video ==
The music video was directed by Deaton-Flanigen Productions and premiered in October 2011.

== Chart performance ==
"Home" debuted at number 53 on the U.S. Billboard Hot Country Songs chart for the week of October 15, 2011. It also debuted at number 70 on the Billboard Hot 100 for the week of November 26, 2011. It also debuted at number 62 on the Canadian Hot 100 chart for the week of February 25, 2012.

Chart (2011–2012)	Peak position
Canada Hot 100 (Billboard)	62
Canada Country (Billboard)	1
US Hot Country Songs (Billboard)	1
US Billboard Hot 100	44

=== Year-end charts ===
Chart (2012)	Position
US Country Songs (Billboard)	16

== Certifications ==
Region	Certification	Certified units/sales
United States (RIAA)	Platinum	1,000,000^{‡}
^{‡} Sales+streaming figures based on certification alone.
