= Say You Do (Dierks Bentley song) =

Single by Dierks Bentley

from the album Riser
- Released: October 6, 2014
- Recorded: 2013–14
- Genre: Country
- Length: 3:40
- Label: Capitol Nashville
- Songwriters: Shane McAnally; Matthew Ramsey; Trevor Rosen
- Producer: Ross Copperman

Dierks Bentley singles chronology
"Drunk on a Plane" (2014)	"Say You Do" (2014)	"Riser" (2015)

"Say You Do" is a song written by Shane McAnally, Matthew Ramsey and Trevor Rosen, and recorded by American country music artist Dierks Bentley. It was released in October 2014 as the fourth single from Bentley's 2014 album Riser (2014).

The song has sold 362,000 copies in the US as of May 2015. On June 3, 2015, it was certified Gold by the RIAA.

== Background ==
Bentley stated that "Say You Do" was the song on his album Riser that he loved from the very beginning. He added that he and his camp knew it was going to be a single; they just had to find the right time for it.

== Content ==
This song is about a man who begs his ex-lover to say she'll come back to him and love him for the night like she used to, even if she won't. Bentley said that the song "is about wanting something so badly even if it's not good for you, just wanting that love back, which is something I think everyone can relate to at some point in their life".

== Music video ==
A music video for the song was directed by Wes Edwards and premiered on September 22, 2014. In the somber video, shot in Canada, Bentley lands with his plane on a lake. He then rides on his motorcycle to a secluded cabin where he spends the night drinking whiskey alone.

== Charts and certifications ==
=== Weekly charts ===
Chart (2014–2015)	Peak position
Canada (Canadian Hot 100)	60
Canada Country (Billboard)	4
US Billboard Hot 100	52
US Country Airplay (Billboard)	1
US Hot Country Songs (Billboard)	5

=== Year-end charts ===
Chart (2015)	Position
US Country Airplay (Billboard)	14
US Hot Country Songs (Billboard)	37

=== Certifications ===
Region	Certification	Certified units/sales
United States (RIAA)	Platinum	1,000,000^{‡}
^{‡} Sales+streaming figures based on certification alone.
