= Tip It On Back =

"Tip It on Back"

Single by Dierks Bentley

from the album Home
- Released: August 20, 2012
- Recorded: 2011–12
- Genre: Country
- Length: 3:26
- Label: Capitol Nashville
- Songwriters: Ross Copperman; Jon Nite; Tully Kennedy
- Producers: Brett Beavers; Luke Wooten

Dierks Bentley singles chronology
"5-1-5-0" (2012)	"Tip It on Back" (2012)	"Bourbon in Kentucky" (2013)

"Tip It on Back" is a song written by Ross Copperman, Jon Nite, and Tully Kennedy and recorded by American country music artist Dierks Bentley. It was released in August 2012 as the fourth and final single from Bentley's 2012 album Home. This song is also Bentley's first single that he did not co-write.

== Critical reception ==
Billy Dukes of Taste of Country gave the song four stars out of five, writing that "it’s as if you’re in the singer’s basement watching him jam with a few friendly pickers" and calling it "the most chill three-and-a-half minutes of music on country radio right now." Matt Bjorke of Roughstock gave the song a favorable review, saying that "the melody is moody and accentuates Dierks' vocal while also allowing the mandolins and other instrumentals to shine."

Kevin John Coyne of Country Universe gave the song a C grade, writing that "Bentley’s engaging enough of a personality and effective enough as a vocalist to keep the proceedings professional and competent [but the song] is just one of those forgettable songs that every time you hear it, it’s just a reminder that it exists."

== Music video ==
The music video was directed by Wes Edwards and premiered in September 2012. It was filmed at the Georgia Theatre in Athens, Georgia.

== Chart performance ==
"Tip It on Back" debuted at number 50 on the U.S. Billboard Hot Country Songs chart for the week of September 1, 2012. It also debuted at number 99 on the U.S. Billboard Hot 100 chart for the week of November 17, 2012.

Chart (2012–2013)	Peak position
Canada Country (Billboard)	28
US Billboard Hot 100	66
US Hot Country Songs (Billboard)	16
US Country Airplay (Billboard)	5

=== Year-end charts ===
Chart (2012)	Position
US Hot Country Songs (Billboard)	96

Chart (2013)	Position
US Country Airplay (Billboard)	49
US Hot Country Songs (Billboard)	61

== Certifications ==
Region	Certification	Certified units/sales
United States (RIAA)	Gold	500,000^{‡}
^{‡} Sales+streaming figures based on certification alone.
