= Dierks Bentley =

American country singer-songwriter (born 1975)

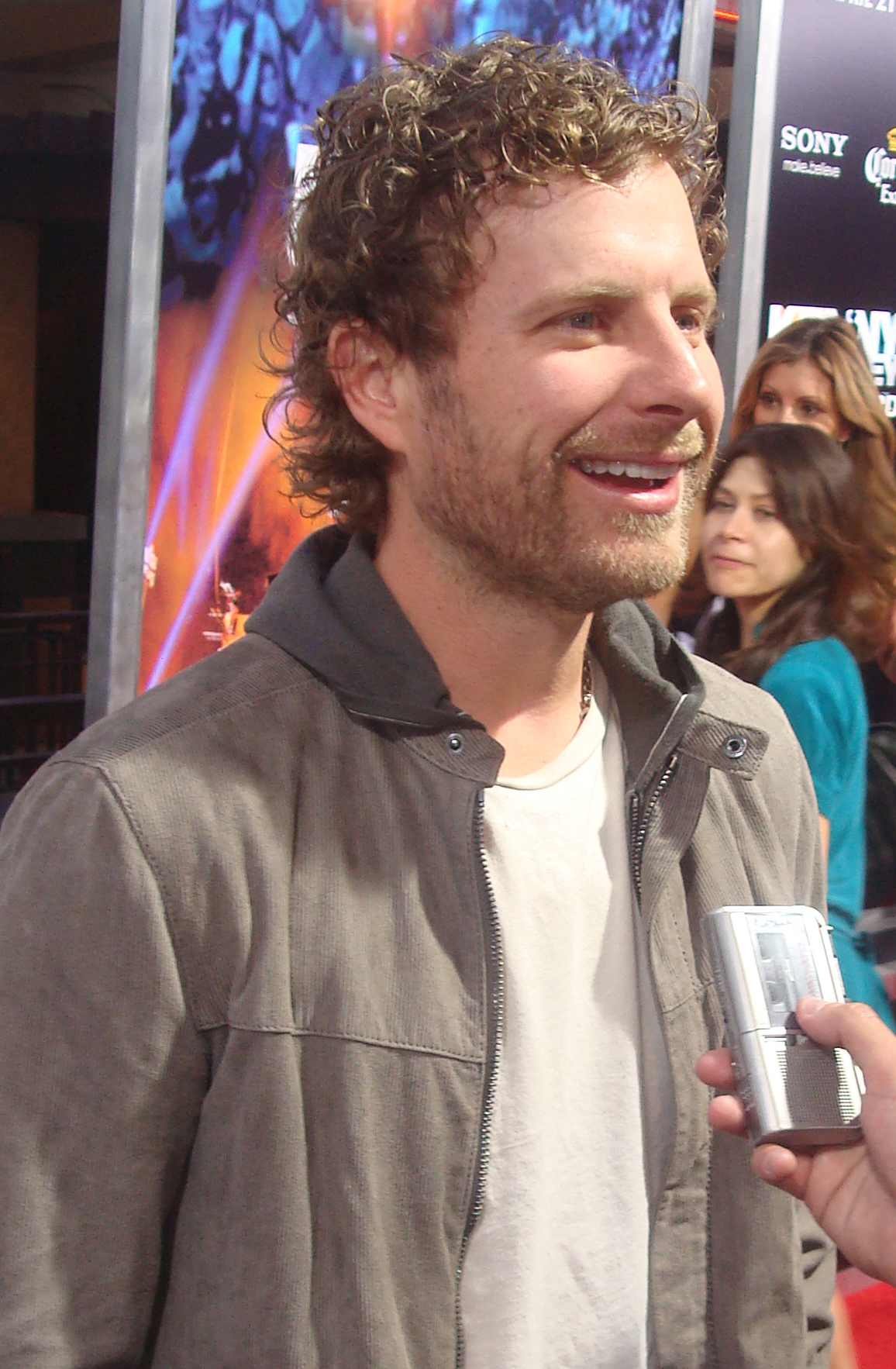
- Bentley in 2010

Background information
- Also known as: Douglas "Doug" Douglason
- Born: Frederick Dierks Bentley; November 20, 1975 (age 51); Phoenix, Arizona, U.S.
- Genres: Country; bluegrass
- Occupations: Musician, singer-songwriter, record producer
- Instruments: Vocals, guitar
- Years active: 2001–present
- Labels: Dangling Rope, Capitol Nashville
- Member of: Hot Country Knights
- Website: dierks.com

Frederick Dierks Bentley (/ˈdɜːrks/; born November 20, 1975) is an American country singer and songwriter. In 2003, he signed to Capitol Nashville and released his eponymous debut album. Both it and its follow-up, 2005's Modern Day Drifter, are certified Platinum in the United States, and his third album, 2006's Long Trip Alone, is certified Gold. It was followed in mid-2008 by a greatest hits package. His fourth album, Feel That Fire, was released in February 2009, and a bluegrass album, Up on the Ridge, was released on June 8, 2010. His sixth album, Home, followed in February 2012, as did a seventh one, Riser, in 2014. Bentley's eighth album, titled Black, was released in May 2016, and his ninth, The Mountain, was released in June 2018. His tenth studio album, Gravel & Gold, was released in February 2023. In 2020, he founded the novelty band Hot Country Knights, in which he portrays lead singer Douglas "Doug" Douglason.

Bentley's studio albums have accounted for 27 singles on the Hot Country Songs and Country Airplay charts, of which 18 have reached No. 1: his debut single, "What Was I Thinkin'", "Come a Little Closer", "Settle for a Slowdown", "Every Mile a Memory", "Free and Easy (Down the Road I Go)", "Feel That Fire", "Sideways", "Am I the Only One", "Home", "5-1-5-0", "I Hold On", "Drunk on a Plane", "Say You Do", "Somewhere on a Beach", "Different for Girls", "Woman, Amen", "Living" and "Beers on Me". Eight more of his singles have reached the top 5, and he has an additional No. 1 as a part of "Forever Country", and one on the Canada Country chart as a featured artist on "New Old Trucks".

== Early life ==
Bentley was born on November 20, 1975, in Phoenix, Arizona, as the son of Leon Fife Bentley (August 16, 1923 – June 1, 2012), a bank vice president, and Catherine Childs. His father was born in Glasgow, Missouri, to Richard Thomas Bentley Jr. and Mary Cecile (née Fife) Bentley, and was a First Lieutenant in World War II. His middle name, Dierks (which he now uses as his first name publicly), is also his maternal great-grandmother's surname. He attended Culver Summer Schools and Camps in Indiana and graduated from The Lawrenceville School in New Jersey in 1993. Afterward, he spent a year at the University of Vermont (UVM) before transferring to Vanderbilt University in Nashville, Tennessee, where he graduated in 1997.

== Music career ==
=== 2003–05: Dierks Bentley and Modern Day Drifter ===
Bentley worked at The Nashville Network (now Paramount Network), researching old footage of country performances. During this time, Bentley was banned from the Grand Ole Opry for trespassing on the grounds of the Opry House for research purposes, a ban that would be lifted when Bentley's first album was released. In 2003, Capitol Nashville released Bentley's self-titled debut album. The album's first single, "What Was I Thinkin'", reached No. 1 on the US Billboard Hot Country Songs charts later that year. The next two singles from the album – "My Last Name" and "How Am I Doin'" – reached No. 17 and No. 4, respectively. The album was certified Platinum by the RIAA.

Bentley's second album, Modern Day Drifter, was released in 2005. It spawned two No. 1 singles in "Come a Little Closer" and "Settle for a Slowdown", as well as the No. 3 hit "Lot of Leavin' Left to Do". The album was also certified Platinum.

In 2005, Bentley won the CMA Award for the Horizon Award (now Best New Artist) and was invited to be a member of the Grand Ole Opry. The induction took place on October 1, 2005. Bentley stands as the third-youngest member after Carrie Underwood and Josh Turner.

=== 2006–08: Long Trip Alone and Greatest Hits/Every Mile a Memory 2003–2008 ===
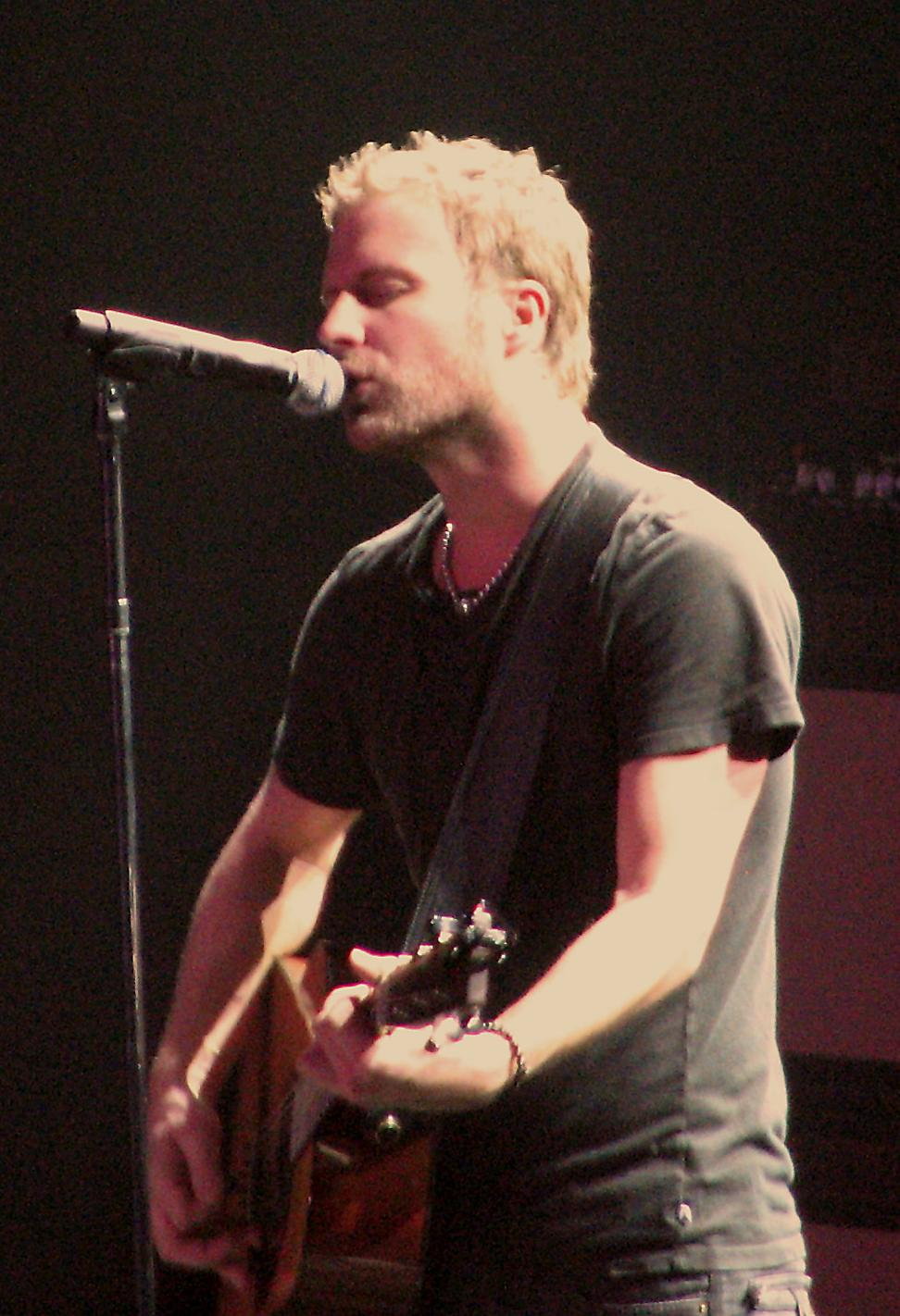
Dierks Bentley performing in Saginaw, Michigan, March 31, 2007

On June 10, 2006, Bentley released his third album, Long Trip Alone. The album produced two No. 1 hits in "Every Mile a Memory" in 2006 and "Free and Easy (Down the Road I Go)" in 2007. The title track reached No. 10 on the country charts, while the fourth single, "Trying to Stop Your Leaving", peaked at No. 5.

In 2007, Bentley released a live DVD titled Live and Loud at the Fillmore, which was filmed in Denver, Colorado.

In a March 2008 interview, Bentley said he would let his fans be the executive producers of his first greatest hits album, Greatest Hits/Every Mile a Memory 2003–2008. The album was released on May 6, 2008. An album cut, "Sweet & Wild", reached No. 51 on the Hot Country Songs chart. The song was an uncredited duet with fellow country singer Sarah Buxton.

=== 2009–10: Feel That Fire and Up on the Ridge ===
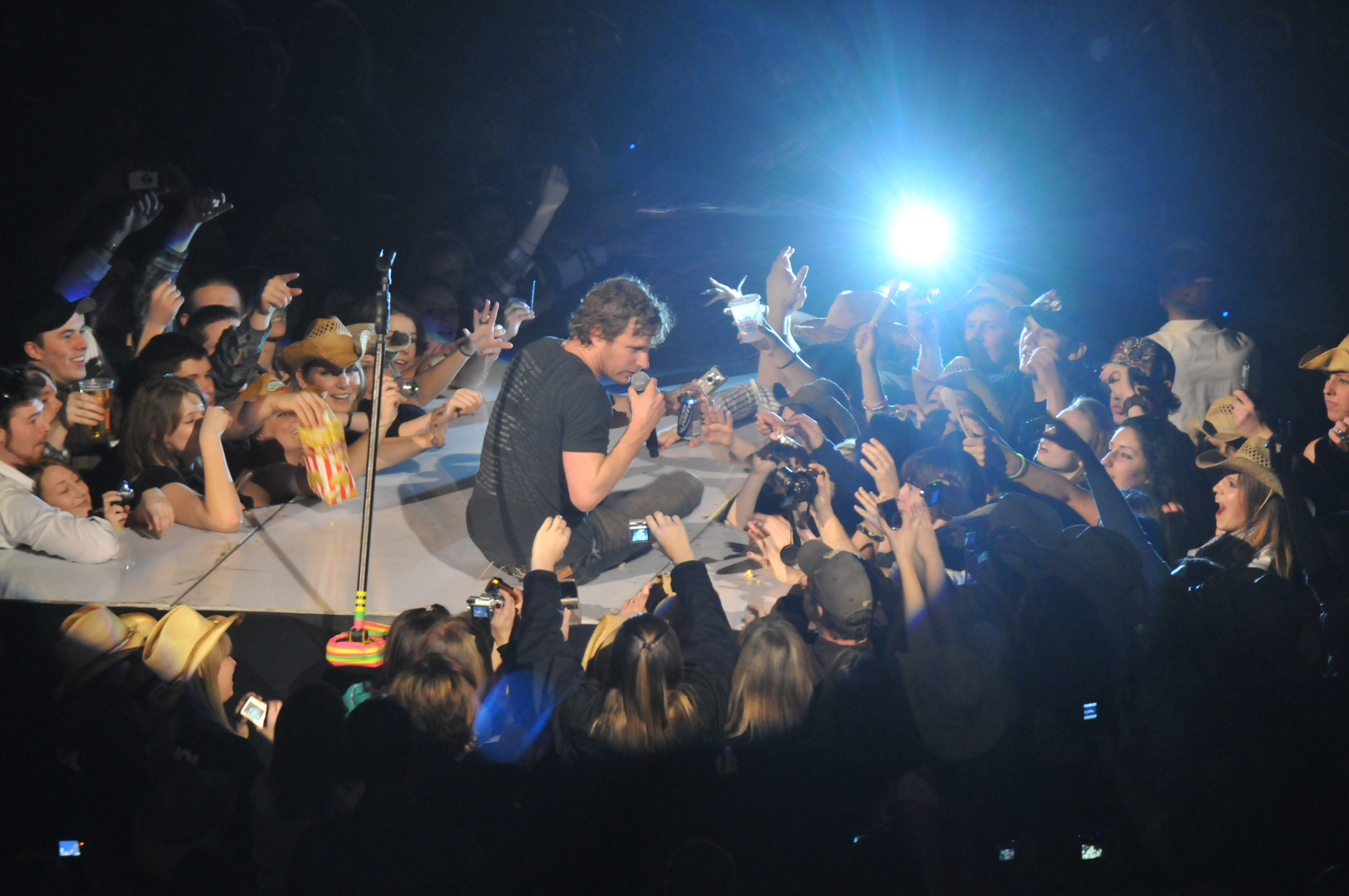
Bentley opening for Brad Paisley at Scotiabank Place in Ottawa, Ontario, February 14, 2009

Bentley's fourth studio album, Feel That Fire, was released in February 2009. Its title track, co-written by Brett Beavers and The Warren Brothers, became Bentley's sixth No. 1 hit in February 2009, and the album's second single, "Sideways", became his seventh in summer 2009. The third and final single, "I Wanna Make You Close Your Eyes", peaked at No. 2.

Bentley released his fifth studio album, Up on the Ridge, on June 8, 2010. The title track was released on iTunes on April 20, 2010. The song peaked at No. 21 on the US Billboard Hot Country Songs chart, becoming Bentley's first single to miss the Top 10 since "My Last Name". The second single from the album, "Draw Me a Map", reached No. 33.

=== 2012–13: Home and Country & Cold Cans EP ===
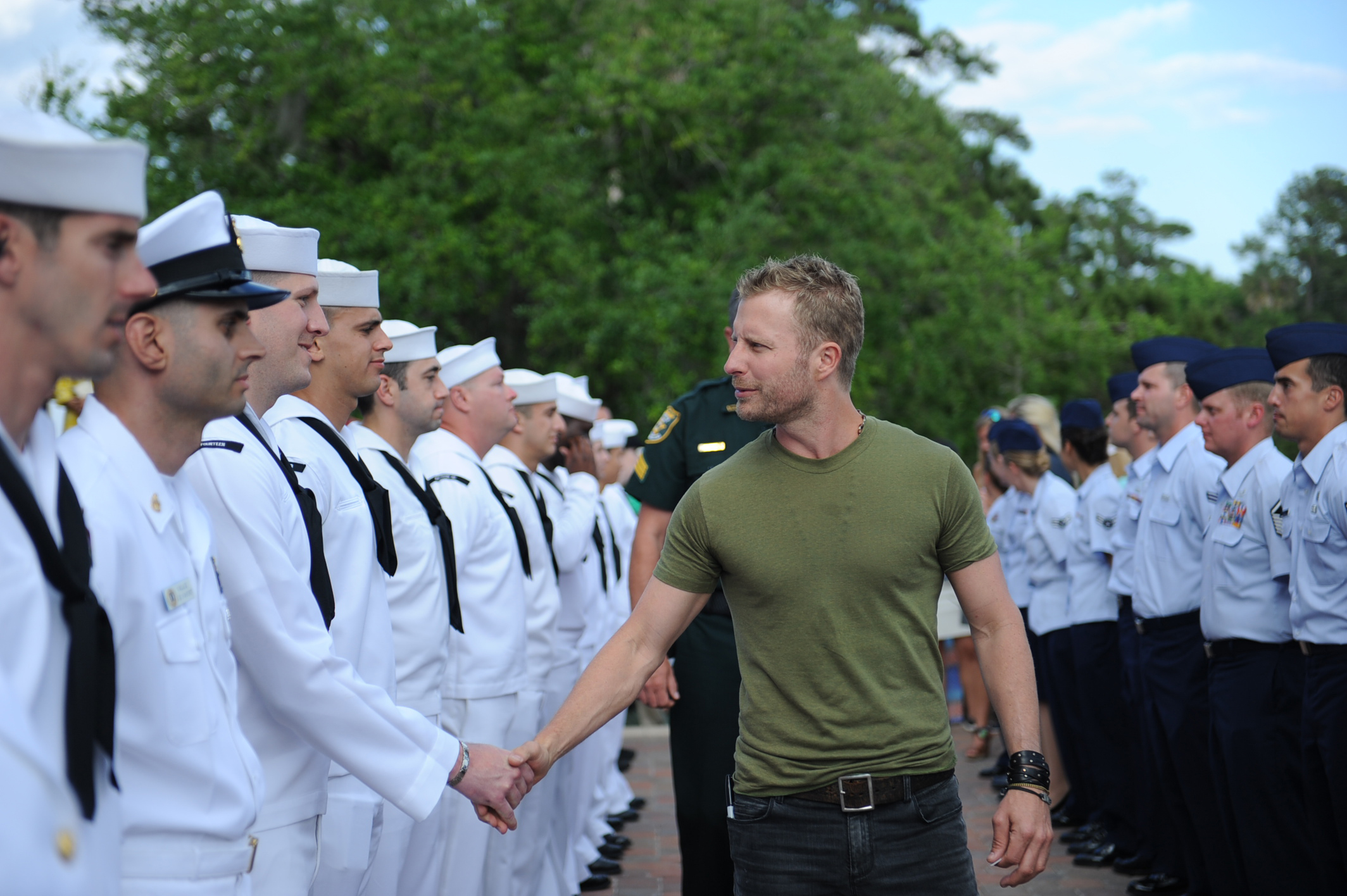
Bentley meeting with service members before a concert during Military Appreciation Day in Ponte Vedra Beach, Florida, May 8, 2013

Bentley's sixth album, Home, was released on February 7, 2012, led by the single, "Am I the Only One", which reached No. 1 on the Billboard Country Singles. The second single off the album is "Home", which was co-written by Bentley, Brett Beavers and Dan Wilson, and also reached No. 1 on March 24, 2012. A third single, "5-1-5-0", was released shortly after "Home" fell from No. 1 on the country chart. Dierks has been quoted by American Songwriter, explaining: "I wrote too many songs. I wrote 70. I wrote a lot. There's 64 that are never going to see the light of day. That's 64 days that I can't get back."

On August 21, 2012, Bentley released the Country & Cold Cans EP on iTunes. It includes five songs, including a radio edit of the track "Tip It On Back" from his album Home. Bentley paid for the studio time to record the EP himself. On October 23, Bentley and Miranda Lambert announced the co-headlined 33-show Locked and Reloaded Tour, which began on January 17, 2013.

=== 2014–2015: Riser ===
Bentley's seventh album, Riser, was released on February 25, 2014. The album's first single, "Bourbon in Kentucky", was released to country radio on June 10, 2013. It peaked at No. 45 on the Billboard Country Airplay chart, becoming Bentley's lowest-charting single to date. The album's second single, "I Hold On", was released on August 26, 2013, and became his first No. 1 on the Country Airplay chart in April 2014 and his 11th overall to do so. The third single, "Drunk on a Plane", followed that same month and reached No. 1 on Country Airplay in August 2014 and was also a strong commercial hit, reaching No. 27 on the Billboard Hot 100. The album's fourth single, "Say You Do", was released on October 6, 2014; it reached No. 1 on Country Airplay in May 2015. The title track became the album's fifth single in June 2015.

Bentley, along with Eric Paslay, is featured on Charles Kelley's debut solo single, "The Driver", which was released on September 28, 2015. The song received a Grammy nomination for Best Country Duo/Group Performance for the 58th Annual Grammy Awards.

=== 2016–2017: Black ===
Bentley released his eighth album, Black, on May 27, 2016. The album's first single, "Somewhere on a Beach", was released on January 25, 2016.

Bentley co-hosted the 51st Academy of Country Music Awards on April 3, 2016, where he was also nominated for the Male Vocalist of the Year and Video of the Year awards.

Bentley released a series of four short films for songs from Black, with episode 1 being the song "I'll Be the Moon" featuring Maren Morris. The following episode serves as the video for "What the Hell Did I Say". The album's second single, "Different for Girls" featuring Elle King, was released to country radio on June 6, 2016. It reached No. 1 on Country Airplay in October 2016. The album's title track was released to country radio as the third single on November 14, 2016.

He was also selected as one of 30 artists to perform on "Forever Country", a mashup track of "Take Me Home, Country Roads", "On the Road Again" and "I Will Always Love You", which celebrates 50 years of the CMA Awards.

=== 2018–2021: The Mountain and Hot Country Knights ===
On June 8, 2018, Bentley released The Mountain, his ninth studio album, via Capitol Records Nashville. All three singles from the album – "Women, Amen", "Burning Man" and "Living" – reached No. 1 (the second of which, however, only being recognized by Mediabase).

Bentley's side project, a '90s country parody band called Hot Country Knights, signed on with Bentley's label Universal Music Group Nashville as a separate recording act in 2020. The act consists of Bentley and his road band, all of whom operate under stage names; Bentley uses the name Douglas "Doug" Douglason. They released their debut single, "Pick Her Up" – which was co-written by Bentley with Jim Beavers and Brett Beavers, and features guest vocals from Travis Tritt – on January 23, 2020.

Bentley released a new single, "Gone", on October 22, 2020. The song was his highest-charting single on the Billboard Hot 100 since his 2003 debut, "What Was I Thinkin'". On July 29, 2021, he released "Beers on Me" featuring Hardy and Breland. He also joined James Barker Band on the single "New Old Trucks" in October 2021.

=== 2022–present: Gravel & Gold ===
On July 29, 2022, Bentley released the lead single, "Gold", from his tenth studio album, Gravel & Gold, which was released on February 24, 2023. On November 19, he released "High Note", a bluegrass track featuring Billy Strings.

the album was released on June 13, 2025.

== Personal life ==
Bentley married Cassidy Black on December 17, 2005, in Mexico. The couple have two daughters and a son. One daughter makes a vocal appearance on the song "Thinking of You" from Bentley's 2012 album, Home, and their son appears in the music video for Bentley's 2019 single, "Living".

Bentley has said that "Sadhguru's ‘Inner Engineering’ has had the most profound impact on my life."

Bentley holds a private pilot license. He owns a Cirrus SR22T and flies a Cessna Citation CJ4.

== Tours ==
Headlining

- High Times and Hangovers Tour (2006)
- Locked and Loaded Tour (2007)
- Free and Easy Summer Tour (2007)
- Throttle Wide Open Tour (2008)
- Up on the Ridge Tour (2010)
- Jäegermeister Tour (2011)
- Country and Cold Cans (2011)
- Country and Cold Cans (Festivals) (2021)
- Riser Tour (2014)
- Sounds of Summer Tour (2015)
- Somewhere on a Beach Tour (2016)
- What the Hell World Tour (2017)
- Mountain High Tour (2018)
- Burning Man Tour (2019)
- High Times and Hangovers Tour (2021)
- Beers on Me Tour (2021–2022)
- Gravel & Gold Tour (2023)
- Broken Branches Tour (2025)

Co-headlining

- Locked and Re-Loaded Tour (2013) (with Miranda Lambert)

Supporting

- Guitars, Tiki Bars and a Whole Lotta Love Tour (2004) (with Kenny Chesney)
- The Road and the Radio Tour (2006) (with Kenny Chesney)
- Paisley Party Tour (2009) (with Brad Paisley)
- American Saturday Night Tour (2009) (with Brad Paisley)
- My Kinda Saturday Night Tour (2026) (with Luke Combs)

== Discography ==
Studio albums

- Dierks Bentley (2003)
- Modern Day Drifter (2005)
- Long Trip Alone (2006)
- Feel That Fire (2009)
- Up on the Ridge (2010)
- Home (2012)
- Riser (2014)
- Black (2016)
- The Mountain (2018)
- Gravel & Gold (2023)
- Broken Branches (2025)

As Part of Hot Country Knights

- The K Is Silent (2020)

== Awards and nominations ==
=== Grammy Awards ===
Year	Recipient/Nominee	Award	Result
2007	"Every Mile a Memory"	Best Male Country Vocal Performance	Nominated
2007	"Every Mile a Memory"	Best Country Song	Nominated
2008	"Long Trip Alone"	Best Male Country Vocal Performance	Nominated
2008	"Long Trip Alone"	Best Country Song	Nominated
2008	Long Trip Alone	Best Country Album	Nominated
2008	Live & Loud At The Fillmore	Best Long Form Music Video	Nominated
2010	"Beautiful World" (featuring Patty Griffin)	Best Country Collaboration with Vocals	Nominated
2011	Up on the Ridge	Best Country Album	Nominated
2011	"Bad Angel" (with Miranda Lambert and Jamey Johnson)	Best Country Collaboration with Vocals	Nominated
2011	"Pride (In the Name of Love)" (with Punch Brothers & Del McCoury)	Best Country Collaboration with Vocals	Nominated
2013	"Home"	Best Country Solo Performance	Nominated
2015	Riser	Best Country Album	Nominated
2016	"The Driver" (with Charles Kelley and Eric Paslay)	Best Country Duo/Group Performance	Nominated
2017	"Different for Girls" (with Elle King)	Best Country Duo/Group Performance	Nominated

=== Country Music Association Awards ===
Year	Recipient/Nominee	Award	Result
2004	Dierks Bentley	Horizon Award	Nominated
2005	Dierks Bentley	Horizon Award	Won
2006	Dierks Bentley	Male Vocalist of the Year	Nominated
2007	Long Trip Alone	Album of the Year	Nominated
2010	Dierks Bentley	Male Vocalist	Nominated
2010	Up on the Ridge	Album of the Year	Nominated
2010	"Bad Angel" (with Miranda Lambert and Jamey Johnson)	Musical Event	Nominated
2012	"Home"	Song of the Year	Nominated
2012	"Home"	Single of the Year	Nominated
2012	Home	Album of the Year	Nominated
2014	Dierks Bentley	Male Vocalist of the Year	Nominated
2014	Riser	Album of the Year	Nominated
2014	"I Hold On"	Song of the Year	Nominated
2014	"Drunk on a Plane"	Single of the Year	Nominated
2014	"Drunk on a Plane"	Music Video of the Year	Won
2015	Dierks Bentley	Male Vocalist of the Year	Nominated
2016	Dierks Bentley	Male Vocalist of the Year	Nominated
2016	Black	Album of the Year	Nominated
2016	"Different for Girls" (with Elle King)	Musical Event of the Year	Won
2016	"Somewhere on a Beach"	Music Video of the Year	Nominated
2017	Dierks Bentley	Male Vocalist of the Year	Nominated
2018	Dierks Bentley	Male Vocalist of the Year	Nominated
2018	The Mountain	Album of the Year	Nominated
2018	"Burning Man" feat. Brothers Osborne	Musical Event of the Year	Nominated
2019	"Burning Man" feat. Brothers Osborne	Single of the Year	Nominated
2019	"Burning Man" feat. Brothers Osborne	Music Video of the Year	Nominated
2019	Dierks Bentley	Male Vocalist of the Year	Nominated

=== Other awards ===
Year	Organization	Award	Result
2004	CMT Music Awards	Breakthrough Video of the Year – "What Was I Thinkin'"	Won
2004	Academy of Country Music Awards	Top New Artist	Won
2006	Academy of Country Music Awards	Top Male Vocalist	Nominated
2009	CMT Music Awards	CMT Performance of the Year – "Country Boy" with Alan Jackson, George Strait and Brad Paisley	Won
2011	Academy of Country Music Awards	Album of the Year – Up on the Ridge	Nominated
2012	Academy of Country Music Awards	Song of the Year – "Home"	Nominated
2012	American Country Awards	Album of the Year – Home	Nominated
2015	Academy of Country Music Awards	Video of the Year – "Drunk on a Plane"	Won
2015	Academy of Country Music Awards	Album of the Year – Riser	Nominated
2015	Academy of Country Music Awards	Single Record of the Year – "Drunk on a Plane"	Nominated
2015	Academy of Country Music Awards	Song of the Year – "I Hold On"	Nominated
2015	Academy of Country Music Awards	Vocal Event of the Year – "The South"	Nominated
2015	Academy of Country Music Awards	Male Vocalist of the Year	Nominated
2016	Academy of Country Music Awards	Video of the Year – "Riser"	Nominated
2016	Academy of Country Music Awards	Male Vocalist of the Year	Nominated
2016	People's Choice Awards	Favorite Male Country Artist	Nominated
2017	iHeartRadio Music Awards	Country Song of the Year – "Somewhere on a Beach"	Won
2017	Billboard Music Awards	Top Country Collaboration — "Different For Girls" with Elle King	Nominated
2017	Academy of Country Music Awards	Male Vocalist of the Year	Nominated
2017	Academy of Country Music Awards	Album of the Year – Black	Nominated
2017	Academy of Country Music Awards	Vocal Event of the Year – "Different For Girls" with Elle King	Nominated
2017	CMT Music Awards	Video of the Year – "Different For Girls" with Elle King	Nominated
2017	CMT Music Awards	Collaborative Video of the Year – "Different For Girls" with Elle King	Nominated
2018	Academy of Country Music Awards	Merle Haggard Spirit Award	Won
2018	Academy of Country Music Awards	Video of the Year – "Black"	Nominated
2019	Academy of Country Music Awards	Music Event of the Year – "Burning Man" feat. Brothers Osborne	Won
2019	Academy of Country Music Awards	Male Artist of the Year	Nominated
2019	Academy of Country Music Awards	Album of the Year – The Mountain	Nominated
2019	Academy of Country Music Awards	Video of the Year – "Burning Man" feat. Brothers Osborne	Nominated
2020	Academy of Country Music Awards	Male Artist of the Year	Nominated
2021	Academy of Country Music Awards	Male Artist of the Year	Nominated
2021	Academy of Country Music Awards	Video of the Year – "Gone"	Nominated

== Film and television ==
Year	Series	Role	Notes
2009	The Rise of Kahne	Himself	A biography of NASCAR driver Kasey Kahne; Bentley is featured in the DVD during an event benefiting the Kasey Kahne Foundation
2010	Live From the Artists Den	Himself	Live performance at the Ravenswood Billboard Factory in Chicago
2012	Weeds	Himself	Sang the theme song for Season 8, Episode 9; aired on Showtime (TV network)
2014	CMT Crossroads	Himself	OneRepublic aired on March 14
2016–2017	Academy of Country Music Awards	Himself/co-host	With Luke Bryan; replaced Blake Shelton
2018	The Voice	Himself	Season 15 finale results
2021	The Voice	Himself	Advisor to Team Blake
