= I Hold On =

Single by Dierks Bentley

from the album Riser
- Released: August 26, 2013
- Recorded: 2013
- Genre: Country
- Length: 4:39 (main version); 3:46 (edit)
- Label: Capitol Nashville
- Songwriters: Brett James; Dierks Bentley
- Producer: Ross Copperman

Dierks Bentley singles chronology
"Bourbon in Kentucky" (2013)	"I Hold On" (2013)	"Drunk on a Plane" (2014)

"I Hold On" is a song co-written and recorded by American country music artist Dierks Bentley. It was released in August 2013 as the second single from his 2014 album Riser. Bentley wrote the song with Brett James.

== Content ==
The song describes the singer staying true to what he enjoys and is comfortable with, including an old truck, an old guitar, and his lover. The truck and guitar referenced are still used by Bentley today. In his Sounds Of Summer tour, he played his old guitar that has a hole in it. Part of the video in the background while he played the song showed his 1994 Chevy Silverado that he and his late father drove to Nashville.

== Critical reception ==
Billy Dukes of Taste of Country gave the song three out of five, writing that "one senses him trying to do something new, something totally unique, but still not quite wanting to give up the sound and style his longtime fans appreciate." Dukes stated that "lyrically, he starts strong, but levels off, relying more on attitude than substance by the midway point." Matt Bjorke of Roughstock gave the song four stars out of five, saying that "with low booming bass lines and a percussive arena-rock melody backing up Dierks Bentley's lyrics, 'I Hold On' is the kind of song that showcases Dierks Bentley in a new way." Bjorke called it "a strong lyrical song, a song which showcases the artistry of Dierks Bentley that sometimes gets dismissed when he's chasing radio airplay but is held up when he records and release stuff that doesn't." In 2017, Billboard contributor Chuck Dauphin placed "I Hold On" at number one on his top 10 list of Bentley's best songs. In 2024, Rolling Stone ranked the song at #182 on its 200 Greatest Country Songs of All Time ranking.

== Live performances ==
Bentley debuted the song when he co-hosted The View on July 26, 2013. He also performed it on the season finale of America's Got Talent on September 18, 2013. On January 3, 2014, he also performed during halftime of the 2014 Orange Bowl.

== Music video ==
A live music video was directed by Ryan Silver and premiered on October 31, 2013. The official music video was directed by Wes Edwards and premiered on October 31, 2013.

== Commercial performance ==
"I Hold On" debuted at number 59 on the U.S. Billboard Country Airplay chart for the week of September 7, 2013. It also debuted at number 35 on the U.S. Billboard Hot Country Songs chart and at number 84 on the Canadian Hot 100 chart for the week of September 14, 2013. It also debuted at number 100 on the U.S. Billboard Hot 100 chart for the week of January 4, 2014. The song was certified Gold by the RIAA on April 28, 2014, and Platinum on November 24, 2014. As of early May 2014, the song has sold 610,000 copies in the United States.

== Charts and certifications ==
=== Weekly charts ===
Chart (2013–2014)	Peak position
Canada Hot 100 (Billboard)	44
Canada Country (Billboard)	2
US Billboard Hot 100	40
US Country Airplay (Billboard)	1
US Hot Country Songs (Billboard)	3

=== Year-end charts ===
Chart (2014)	Position
US Country Airplay (Billboard)	41
US Hot Country Songs (Billboard)	45

=== Certifications ===
Region	Certification	Certified units/sales
United States (RIAA)	2× Platinum	2,000,000^{‡}
^{‡} Sales+streaming figures based on certification alone.
