= 5-1-5-0 =

Single by Dierks Bentley

from the album Home
- Released: April 9, 2012
- Recorded: 2011–12
- Genre: Country rock
- Length: 3:02
- Label: Capitol Nashville
- Songwriters: Dierks Bentley; Brett Beavers; Jim Beavers
- Producers: Brett Beavers; Luke Wooten

Dierks Bentley singles chronology
"Home" (2011)	"5-1-5-0" (2012)	"Tip It On Back" (2012)

"5-1-5-0" is a song co-written and recorded by American country music artist Dierks Bentley. It was released in April 2012 as the third single from his 2012 album Home. The song was written by Bentley, Brett Beavers, and Jim Beavers.

== Background and writing ==
Co-writer Jim Beavers told Taste of Country that the idea for "5-1-5-0" came about when Bentley and he were discussing Van Halen's album 5150. Beavers said that he changed the pronunciation from "fifty-one-fifty" to "five-one-five-oh", and rhymed it with "somebody call the po-po" after seeing a police car.

== Content ==
The title is a reference to the 5150 "involuntary psychiatric hold" in the California Welfare and Institutions Code. In it, the narrator sings that his lover is making him "crazy".

== Critical reception ==
Bobby Peacock of Roughstock gave the song four stars out of five, saying that it was "fun to listen to" and "sticks in the head after only one listen." Billy Dukes of Taste of Country rated it four-and-a-half stars out of five, calling it "three minutes of reckless energy".

== Music video ==
The music video was directed by Wes Edwards and premiered in June 2012.

== Chart performance ==
Chart (2012)	Peak position
Canada Hot 100 (Billboard)	42
Canada Country (Billboard)	1
US Billboard Hot 100	33
US Hot Country Songs (Billboard)	1

=== Year-end charts ===
Chart (2012)	Position
US Country Songs (Billboard)	40

== Certifications ==
Region	Certification	Certified units/sales
Canada (Music Canada)	Gold	40,000^{*}
United States (RIAA)	2× Platinum	2,000,000^{‡}
^{*} Sales figures based on certification alone.^{‡} Sales+streaming figures based on certification alone.
