= Drunk on a Plane =

Single by Dierks Bentley

from the album Riser
- Released: April 21, 2014
- Recorded: 2013–14
- Genre: Country
- Length: 4:14
- Label: Capitol Nashville
- Songwriter(s): Dierks Bentley; Chris Tompkins; Josh Kear
- Producer(s): Ross Copperman

Dierks Bentley singles chronology
"I Hold On" (2013)	"Drunk on a Plane" (2014)	"Say You Do" (2014)

"Drunk on a Plane" is a song co-written and recorded by American country music artist Dierks Bentley. It was released in April 2014 as the third single from his seventh studio album Riser. The song has been certified 4× Platinum by the RIAA. The song was written by Bentley, Josh Kear and Chris Tompkins, relating how the protagonist dealt with being jilted by his fiancée at his wedding.

== Content ==
"Drunk on a Plane" is an up-tempo song about a man who is left behind at the altar and takes a trip to Cancún by himself after he is unable to obtain a refund for the airplane tickets he had purchased for a honeymoon. While on the airplane, the narrator drinks heavily, becoming intoxicated and parties with the other passengers. Bentley told Country Standard Time, "It's a fun song, but when you really listen, there's also an underlying lonesomeness, which is what makes it different than a lot of the other uptempo songs I've put out."

== Critical reception ==
Bob Paxman of Country Weekly rated the song "A", saying, "The song has a particular smartness about it, which sets this apart from the sundry drinking songs that inundate our space…'Drunk on a Plane' captures a sky-high party atmosphere while giving off a melancholy feel at the same time, a difficult maneuver that's pulled off nicely." In 2017, Billboard contributor Chuck Dauphin put "Drunk on a Plane" at number seven on his top 10 list of Bentley's best songs.

== Commercial performance ==
"Drunk on a Plane" was a big commercial success. The song is Bentley's 18th career single to peak in the top 10 on Billboard's Hot Country Songs and Country Airplay chart. In August 2014, it hit number one on Country Airplay. The song peaked at number 27 on the Billboard Hot 100, it is Bentley's third highest-peaking song on the chart, behind only his debut single, "What Was I Thinkin'", which peaked at number 22 and 2020's "Gone"", which peaked at number 26. The song was certified Platinum by the RIAA on September 26, 2014. It reached its million sales mark in the United States in October 2014. The song has sold 1,487,000 copies in the US as of July 2016.

== Music video ==
The video premiered during his performance at the Havelock Country Jamboree. In the music video, Bentley plays both himself and an airline pilot. According to Country Weekly, "musician Dierks (who is a real-life pilot) has to save the day when the craft is plummeting toward the ground." Wes Edwards directed the video. The protagonist is played by comedian Jeff Dye. Other noted actors in the video include Emma Fitzpatrick (as the protagonist's girlfriend), Taylor Saxelby (air stewardess), Josh Schuber (as one of the aisle guys) and Dierks's own drummer as the co-pilot. It was filmed inside a real aircraft stationed at a garage in Los Angeles. While the lyrics mention a Boeing 737, the exterior shots actually show a Boeing 767, and the interiors appear to be those of a Boeing 727. Josh's story is continued in the video for "Somewhere on a Beach", which Edwards would also direct.

The video won Music Video of the Year at the 2014 CMA Awards.

== Charts and certifications ==
=== Weekly charts ===
Chart (2014)	Peak position
Canada (Canadian Hot 100)	34
Canada Country (Billboard)	2
US Billboard Hot 100	27
US Country Airplay (Billboard)	1
US Hot Country Songs (Billboard)	3

=== Year-end charts ===
Chart (2014)	Position
Canada Canadian Hot 100	97
US Billboard Hot 100	79
US Country Airplay (Billboard)	31
US Hot Country Songs (Billboard)	8

=== Certifications ===
Region	Certification	Certified units/sales
Canada (Music Canada)	Platinum	80,000^{*}
United States (RIAA)	4× Platinum	4,000,000^{‡} / 1,487,000
^{*} Sales figures based on certification alone.
