= Dierks Bentley discography =

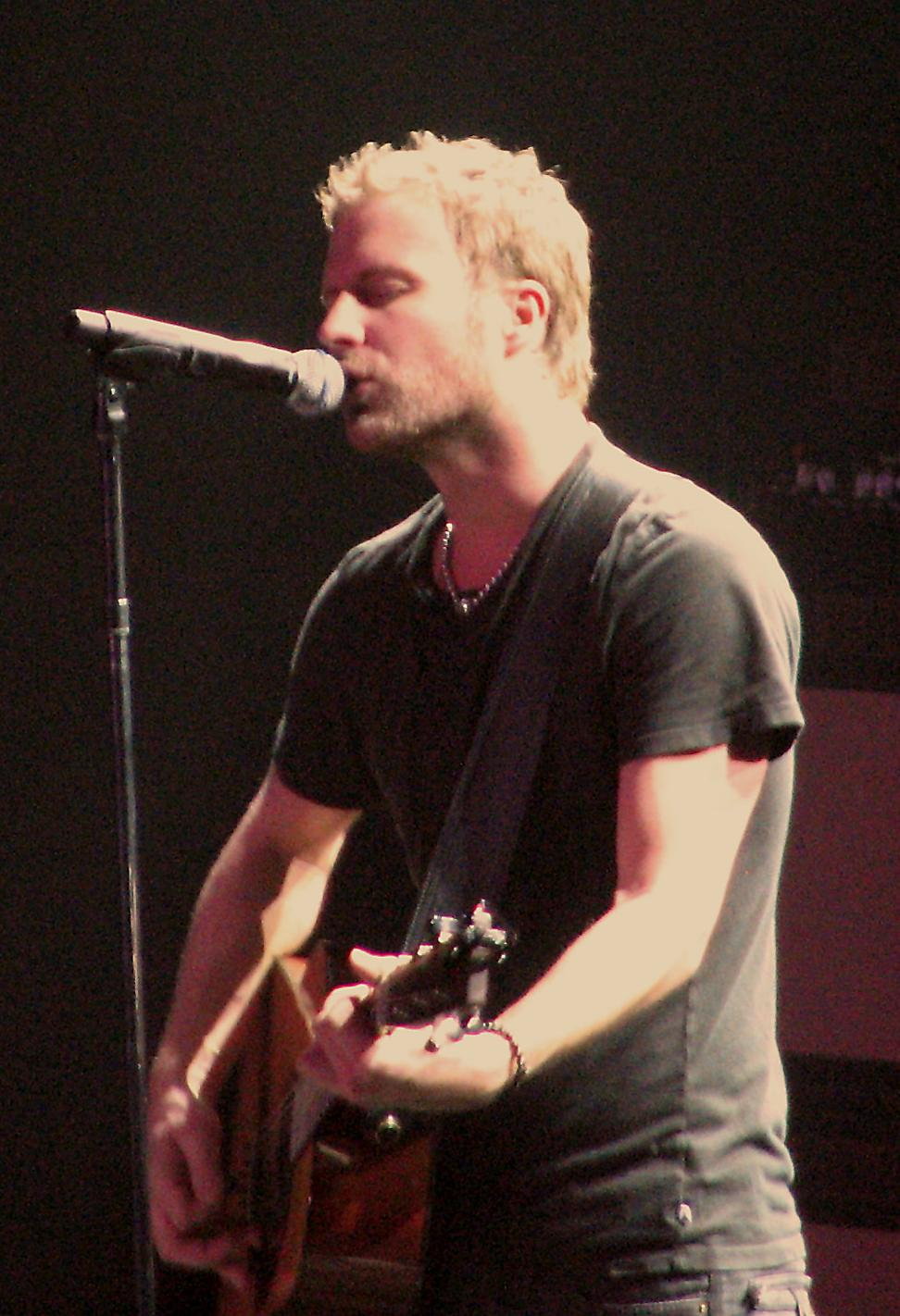
- Dierks Bentley performing in Saginaw, Michigan, March 31, 2007
- Studio albums: 12
- Extended plays: 1
- Live albums: 1
- Compilation albums: 1
- Singles: 37
- Music videos: 37
- Other charted songs: 7

American country music singer and songwriter Dierks Bentley has released twelve studio albums, one live album, one compilation album and 33 singles. In 2003, Capitol Nashville released Bentley's self-titled second album. The album's first single, "What Was I Thinkin'", reached number 1 on the US Billboard Hot Country Songs chart, and 22 on the Billboard Hot 100, his highest-charting single there to date. Bentley then released two studio albums in 2005 and 2006 and produced several number 1 hits on Billboard Hot Country Songs. In 2007, Bentley released a live concert DVD, Live and Loud at the Fillmore, which was recorded in Denver, Colorado.

In a March 2008 interview, Bentley said he'd let his fans be the executive producers to his first greatest hits album, Greatest Hits/Every Mile a Memory 2003–2008. A fifth studio album, Feel That Fire was released on February 3, 2009, which produced the number one hits: "Feel That Fire" and "Sideways". On March 8, 2010, Bentley's official website announced that he would be releasing a bluegrass album entitled Up on the Ridge, which was released on June 8, 2010. Two more albums, Home (2012) and Riser (2014), went to number one on the charts as well; the former also produced three number ones on Hot Country Songs ("Am I the Only One", "Home", and "5-1-5-0") between 2011–12 and the latter contained three more number ones on the Country Airplay chart with "I Hold On", "Drunk on a Plane" and "Say You Do" between 2014–15.

== Albums ==
=== Studio albums ===
Title	Details	Peak chart positions					Certifications (sales threshold)	Sales
Title	Details	US	US Country	US Grass	AUS	CAN	Certifications (sales threshold)	Sales
Don't Leave Me in Love	Release date: June 3, 2001; Label: Dangling Rope; Formats: CD, digital download	—	—	—	—	—		
Dierks Bentley	Release date: August 19, 2003; Label: Capitol Nashville; Formats: CD, digital download	26	4	—	—	—	RIAA: Platinum	US: 1,100,000
Modern Day Drifter	Release date: May 10, 2005; Label: Capitol Nashville; Formats: CD, digital download	6	1	—	—	—	RIAA: Platinum; MC: Gold	US: 1,500,000
Long Trip Alone	Release date: October 17, 2006; Label: Capitol Nashville; Formats: CD, digital download	5	1	—	—	—	RIAA: Gold	
Feel That Fire	Release date: February 3, 2009; Label: Capitol Nashville; Formats: CD, digital download	3	1	—	—	—	RIAA: Gold	US: 327,000
Up on the Ridge	Release date: June 8, 2010; Label: Capitol Nashville; Formats: CD, LP, digital download	9	2	1	—	—		US: 244,000
Home	Release date: February 7, 2012; Label: Capitol Nashville; Formats: CD, digital download	7	1	—	52	12	RIAA: Gold	US: 294,000
Riser	Release date: February 25, 2014; Label: Capitol Nashville; Formats: CD, digital download	6	1	—	62	5	RIAA: Platinum	US: 380,000
Black	Release date: May 27, 2016; Label: Capitol Nashville; Formats: CD, LP, digital download	2	1	—	21	2	RIAA: Platinum	US: 276,400
The Mountain	Release date: June 8, 2018; Label: Capitol Nashville; Formats: CD, LP, digital download	3	1	—	58	10	RIAA: Gold	US: 193,400
Gravel & Gold	Release date: February 24, 2023; Label: Capitol Nashville; Formats: CD, LP, digital download	73	14	—	—	—		
Broken Branches	Release date: June 13, 2025; Label: Capitol Nashville; Formats: CD, LP, digital download	—	45	—	—	—		
"—" denotes releases that did not chart

=== Compilation albums ===
Title	Details	Peak chart positions	
Title	Details	US	US Country
Greatest Hits/Every Mile a Memory 2003–2008	Release date: May 6, 2008; Label: Capitol Nashville; Formats: CD, digital download	9	2

=== Live albums ===
Title	Details	Peak positions
Title	Details	US Country
iTunes: Live from Soho	Release date: June 2, 2009; Label: Capitol Nashville / iTunes; Formats: Digital download	51

== Extended plays ==
Title	Details	Peak chart positions	
Title	Details	US	US Country
Country & Cold Cans	Release date: August 21, 2012; Label: Capitol Nashville; Formats: Digital download	54	12
Live from Telluride	Release date: July 13, 2021; Label: Capitol Nashville; Formats: Digital download	—	—
"—" denotes releases that did not chart

== Singles ==
=== As lead artist ===
==== 2000s ====
Year	Title	Peak chart positions				Certifications (sales threshold)	Album
Year	Title	US	US Country Songs	CAN	CAN Country	Certifications (sales threshold)	Album
2003	"What Was I Thinkin'"	22	1	—	×	RIAA: 4× Platinum	Dierks Bentley
2003	"My Last Name"	— (Note: "My Last Name" did not enter the Billboard Hot 100, but peaked at number two on the Bubbling Under Hot 100 Singles chart.)	17	—	28		Dierks Bentley
2004	"How Am I Doin'"	49	4	—	20		Dierks Bentley
2005	"Lot of Leavin' Left to Do"	47	3	—	1	RIAA: Gold	Modern Day Drifter
2005	"Come a Little Closer"	31	1	—	3	RIAA: Gold	Modern Day Drifter
2006	"Settle for a Slowdown"	42	1	—	3	RIAA: Gold	Modern Day Drifter
2006	"Every Mile a Memory"	48	1	—	2		Long Trip Alone
2006	"Long Trip Alone"	66	10	—	10		Long Trip Alone
2007	"Free and Easy (Down the Road I Go)"	46	1	59	2	RIAA: Platinum	Long Trip Alone
2008	"Trying to Stop Your Leaving"	73	5	—	13		Long Trip Alone
2008	"Feel That Fire"	32	1	54	2	RIAA: Platinum	Feel That Fire
2009	"Sideways"	35	1	63	4	RIAA: Platinum	Feel That Fire
2009	"I Wanna Make You Close Your Eyes"	52	2	92	12	RIAA: Gold	Feel That Fire
"—" denotes releases that did not chart "×" indicates that no relevant chart existed or was archived

==== 2010s ====
Year	Title	Peak chart positions					Certifications (sales threshold)	Album
Year	Title	US	US Country Songs	US Country Airplay	CAN	CAN Country	Certifications (sales threshold)	Album
2010	"Up on the Ridge"	99	21		—	34		Up on the Ridge
2010	"Draw Me a Map"	— (Note: "Draw Me a Map" did not enter the Billboard Hot 100, but peaked at number eight on the Bubbling Under Hot 100 Singles chart.)	33		—	50		Up on the Ridge
2011	"Am I the Only One"	39	1		65	1	RIAA: Platinum; MC: Gold	Home
2011	"Home"	44	1		62	1	RIAA: Gold	Home
2012	"5-1-5-0"	33	1		42	1	RIAA: 2× Platinum; MC: Gold	Home
2012	"Tip It On Back"	66	16	5	—	28	RIAA: Gold	Home
2013	"Bourbon in Kentucky"	—	40	45	—	—		Riser
2013	"I Hold On"	40	3	1	44	2	RIAA: 2× Platinum; MC: Gold	Riser
2014	"Drunk on a Plane"	27	3	1	34	2	RIAA: 4× Platinum; MC: Platinum	Riser
2014	"Say You Do"	52	5	1	60	4	RIAA: Platinum	Riser
2015	"Riser"	— (Note: "Riser" did not enter the Billboard Hot 100, but peaked at number eight on the Bubbling Under Hot 100 Singles chart.)	26	24	—	43	RIAA: Gold	Riser
2016	"Somewhere on a Beach"	35	1	1	59	1	RIAA: 3× Platinum; MC: Platinum	Black
2016	"Different for Girls" (featuring Elle King)	42	3	1	49	1	RIAA: 2× Platinum; MC: Platinum	Black
2016	"Black"	56	4	2	74	8	RIAA: 2× Platinum; MC: Gold	Black
2017	"What the Hell Did I Say"	—	35	46	—	—		Black
2018	"Woman, Amen"	53	7	1	—	1	RIAA: Platinum	The Mountain
2018	"Burning Man" (featuring Brothers Osborne)	45	5	2	72	1	RIAA: 2× Platinum	The Mountain
2019	"Living"	51	6	1	98	1	RIAA: 2× Platinum	The Mountain
"—" denotes releases that did not chart

==== 2020s ====
Year	Title	Peak chart positions					Certifications (sales threshold)	Album
Year	Title	US	US Country Songs	US Country Airplay	CAN	CAN Country	Certifications (sales threshold)	Album
2020	"Gone"	26	2	2	51	2	RIAA: Platinum; MC: Platinum	Non-album singles
2021	"Beers on Me" (with Breland and Hardy)	40	5	1	61	2	RIAA: 2× Platinum	Non-album singles
2022	"Gold"	68	20	2	63	1	RIAA: Gold	Gravel & Gold
2023	"Something Real"	—	—	49	—	37		Gravel & Gold
2024	"American Girl"	—	49	22	—	38		Petty Country: A Country Music Celebration of Tom Petty
2025	"She Hates Me"	—	46	23	—	25		Broken Branches
"—" denotes releases that did not chart

=== As featured artist ===
Year	Title	Peak chart positions					Certifications (sales threshold)	Album
Year	Title	US	US Country Songs	US Country Airplay	CAN	CAN Country	Certifications (sales threshold)	Album
2007	"Good Time" (Deric Ruttan featuring Dierks Bentley)	—	—		—	11		First Time in a Long Time
2009	"Scars" (Lee Kernaghan featuring Dierks Bentley)	—	—		—	—		Planet Country
2013	"The South" (The Cadillac Three featuring Dierks Bentley, Florida Georgia Line and Mike Eli)	—	32	33	—	—		Bury Me in My Boots
2015	"The Driver" (Charles Kelley featuring Dierks Bentley and Eric Paslay)	—	37	44	—	—		The Driver
2016	"Forever Country" (as Artists of Then, Now & Forever)	21	3	33	25	39	RIAA: Gold	Non-album single
2017	"Flatliner" (Cole Swindell featuring Dierks Bentley)	56	10	2	—	4		You Should Be Here
2021	"New Old Trucks" (James Barker Band featuring Dierks Bentley)	—	—	—	63	1	MC: Gold	Non-album single
2022	"Worth a Shot" (Elle King featuring Dierks Bentley)	—	42	38	—	40	RIAA: Gold	Come Get Your Wife
2025	"Hurtin' Songs" (Brett Kissel with Dierks Bentley)	—	—	—	—	9		Let Your Horses Run – The Album
"—" denotes releases that did not chart

=== Promotional singles ===
Year	Title	scope="col" Peak chart positions	Album
Year	Title	US Country Songs	Album
2016	"I'll Be the Moon" (featuring Maren Morris)	40	Black
2016	"Pick Up"	34	Black
2022	"High Note" (featuring Billy Strings)	—	Gravel & Gold
2025	"Cold Beer Can" (featuring Stephen Wilson Jr.)	—	Broken Branches
"—" denotes releases that did not chart

== Other charted songs ==
Year	Title	Peak chart positions			Album
Year	Title	US	US Country Songs	CAN	Album
2005	"Domestic, Light and Cold"	—	51	—	Modern Day Drifter
2008	"Sweet & Wild"	—	51	—	Greatest Hits/Every Mile a Memory 2003–2008
2010	"Life on the Run"	— (Note: "Life on the Run" did not enter the Billboard Hot 100, but peaked at number 19 on the Bubbling Under Hot 100 Singles chart.)	— (Note: "Life on the Run" did not enter Hot Country Songs, but peaked at number 12 on the Country Digital Song Sales chart.)	—	Feel That Fire
2012	"Country & Cold Cans"	—	—	87	Country & Cold Cans
2015	"Sounds of Summer"	—	38	—	Riser
"—" denotes releases that did not chart

== Other appearances ==
Year	Title	Album
2003	"I Don't Believe You've Met My Baby" (with Harley Allen)	Livin', Lovin', Losin': Songs of the Louvin Brothers
2004	"It Is No Secret"	Amazing Grace 3: A Country Salute to Gospel
2006	"Fast Lanes and Country Roads"	She Was Country When Country Wasn't Cool
2008	"A House of Gold"	How Great Thou Art: Gospel Favorites from the Grand Ole Opry
2010	"Beautiful World (Live)"	Live From the Artists Den: Season Two
2012	"Señor (Tales of Yankee Power) (Live)"	Chimes of Freedom: Songs of Bob Dylan Honoring 50 Years of Amnesty International
2012	"Lonesome, On'ry and Mean"	Waylon: The Music Inside, Vol. 2
2013	"'Til It Runs Dry" (with Holly Williams)	The Highway
2014	"'Pancho and Lefty" (with Luke Bryan)	Working Man's Poet: A Tribute to Merle Haggard
2018	"Sad Songs (Say So Much)"	Restoration: Reimagining the Songs of Elton John and Bernie Taupin
2019	"Lay Here With Me" (with Maddie & Tae)	The Way It Feels
2020	"Leaving Lonesome Flats"	Trolls World Tour

== Videography ==
=== Video albums ===
Title	Details
Dierks Bentley: Live and Loud at the Fillmore	Release date: March 20, 2007; Label: Capitol Nashville; Formats: DVD

=== Music videos ===
Year	Title	Director
2003	"What Was I Thinkin'"	Peter Zavadil
2003	"My Last Name"	Peter Zavadil
2004	"How Am I Doin'"	Peter Zavadil
2005	"Lot of Leavin' Left to Do"	Sam Erickson
2005	"Come a Little Closer"	David McClister
2006	"Settle for a Slowdown"	Chris Hicky
2006	"Every Mile a Memory"	Russell Thomas
2006	"Long Trip Alone"	Charles Mehling
2007	"Free and Easy (Down the Road I Go)"	Charles Mehling
2007	"Good Time" (with Deric Ruttan)	Antonio Hrynchuk
2008	"Trying to Stop Your Leaving"	Trey Fanjoy
2008	"Feel That Fire"	Peter Zavadil
2009	"Sideways"	Michael Salomon
2009	"I Wanna Make You Close Your Eyes"	Chris Hicky
2009	"Beautiful World" (with Patty Griffin)	
2010	"Up on the Ridge"	Roger Pistole
2010	"Bad Angel" (with Jamey Johnson and Miranda Lambert)	George Flanigen
2010	"Draw Me a Map"	Roger Pistole
2011	"Am I the Only One"	Deaton Flanigen
2011	"Am I the Only One" (NHL version)	Ryan Silver
2011	"Scars" (with Lee Kernaghan)	Robb Cox
2011	"Home"	Deaton Flanigen
2012	"5-1-5-0"	Wes Edwards
2012	"Grab a Beer"	Ryan Silver
2012	"Tip It On Back"	Wes Edwards
2013	"I Hold On" (tour performance)	Ryan Silver
2013	"I Hold On"	Wes Edwards
2014	"Bourbon in Kentucky"	Ryan Pallotta
2014	"Drunk on a Plane"	Wes Edwards
2014	"Say You Do"	Wes Edwards
2015	"Riser"	Wes Edwards
2016	"Somewhere on a Beach"	Wes Edwards
2016	"I'll Be the Moon"	Wes Edwards
2016	"What the Hell Did I Say"	Wes Edwards
2016	"Pick Up"	Wes Edwards
2016	"Black"	Wes Edwards
2016	"Different for Girls"	Wes Edwards
2017	"Hold the Light (From Only the Brave Soundtrack)"	Wes Edwards
2018	"Woman, Amen"	Wes Edwards
2018	"Burning Man" (with Brothers Osborne)	Wes Edwards
2019	"Living"	Wes Edwards
2021	"Gone"	
2022	"Beers On Me" (featuring Hardy and Breland)	
2022	"Gold"	
2023	"High Note" (featuring Billy Strings)	
2023	"Same Ol' Me"	
2023	"Cowboy Boots" (featuring Ashley McBryde)	

=== Guest appearances ===
Year	Title	Director
2011	"Cinnamon Girl" (with Booker T. Jones)	Leon Knoles
2013	"American Pickers" (with The Grascals)	Zack Wilson
2015	"The Driver" (with Charles Kelley and Eric Paslay)	TK McKamy
2016	"Forever Country" (Artists of Then, Now and Forever)	Joseph Kahn
2017	"Flatiner" (with Cole Swindell)	Michael Monaco

== See also ==
- Hot Country Knights#Discography
