= Greatest Hits/Every Mile a Memory 2003–2008 =

Greatest hits album by Dierks Bentley
- Released: May 6, 2008
- Recorded: 2003–2008
- Genre: Country
- Length: 1:11:22
- Label: Capitol Nashville
- Producers: Brett Beavers; Dierks Bentley; Luke Wooten

Dierks Bentley chronology
Long Trip Alone (2006)	Greatest Hits/Every Mile a Memory 2003–2008 (2008)	Feel That Fire (2009)

Professional ratings
Review scores
Source	Rating
Allmusic	4/5 stars
Country Weekly	3.5/5 stars
Slant Magazine	4/5 stars

Greatest Hits/Every Mile a Memory 2003–2008 is the first compilation album by American country music singer Dierks Bentley. It was released May 6, 2008 via Capitol Records Nashville. His fourth album from that label, the album includes his ten singles from his first three studio albums: his 2003 self-titled debut, 2005's Modern Day Drifter, and 2006's Long Trip Alone. Two newly-recorded songs were also added to this compilation; those were "Sweet and Wild" (a duet with Sarah Buxton) and "With the Band". The CD even includes live recordings of the album cuts "So So Long" (originally on Modern Day Drifter) and "Wish It Would Break" (originally from his self-titled debut) as well as live renditions of his singles "Come a Little Closer", "Lot of Leavin' Left to Do", and "Free and Easy (Down the Road I Go)".

Bentley enlisted the help of his fans to assist in selection of the album's live tracks, title, and cover art. The first 3000 are credited as executive producers in the liner notes.

== Track listing ==
No.	Title	Writer(s)	Length
1.	"Free and Easy (Down the Road I Go)" (radio edit)	Brett Beavers; Dierks Bentley; Rob Harrington; Rod Janzen	3:21
2.	"Trying to Stop Your Leaving"	B. Beavers; Jim Beavers; Bentley	3:42
3.	"Sweet and Wild" (duet with Sarah Buxton)	Jay Clementi; Radney Foster	4:49
4.	"Come a Little Closer"	B. Beavers; Bentley	4:42
5.	"How Am I Doin'"	J. Beavers; Bentley	3:48
6.	"Every Mile a Memory"	B. Beavers; Steve Bogard; Bentley	3:54
7.	"My Last Name"	Harley Allen; Bentley	3:30
8.	"Lot of Leavin' Left to Do"	Deric Ruttan; B. Beavers; Bentley	4:33
9.	"With the Band"	J. Beavers; B. Beavers; Bentley	3:46
10.	"Settle for a Slowdown"	B. Beavers; Tony Martin; Bentley	3:43
11.	"What Was I Thinkin'"	Ruttan; B. Beavers; Bentley	4:21
12.	"Long Trip Alone"	B. Beavers; Bogard; Bentley	3:44
13.	"So So Long" (live recording)	B. Beavers; J. Beavers; Bentley	3:44
14.	"Come a Little Closer" (live recording)	B. Beavers; Bentley	5:46
15.	"Lot of Leavin' Left to Do" (live recording)	Ruttan; B. Beavers; Bentley	5:43
16.	"Wish It Would Break" (live recording)	B. Beavers; Bentley	4:33
17.	"Free and Easy (Down the Road I Go)" (live recording)	B. Beavers; Bentley; Harrington; Janzen	3:43

== Personnel on new and live tracks ==
- Brett Beavers – background vocals
- Jim Beavers – background vocals
- Dierks Bentley – acoustic guitar, electric guitar, lead vocals
- Sarah Buxton – vocals on "Sweet and Wild"
- Rob Harrington – bass guitar
- Rod Janzen – electric guitar, background vocals
- Greg Mangum – background vocals
- Steve Misamore – drums
- Gary Morse – lap steel guitar
- Tim Sergent – banjo, pedal steel guitar, background vocals
- Bryan Sutton – banjo, acoustic guitar
- Russell Terrell – background vocals
- Luke Wooten – background vocals

== Charts ==
=== Weekly charts ===
Chart (2008)	Peak position
US Billboard 200	9
US Top Country Albums (Billboard)	2

=== Year-end charts ===
Chart (2008)	Position
US Top Country Albums (Billboard)	40
Chart (2009)	Position
US Top Country Albums (Billboard)	62
