= Up All Night – Deric Ruttan Live =

Live album by Deric Ruttan
- Released: September 20, 2011
- Genre: Country
- Length: 1:14:10
- Label: Black T Records/EMI

Deric Ruttan chronology
Sunshine (2010)	Up All Night – Deric Ruttan Live (2011)	Take the Week Off (2013)

Singles from Up All Night – Deric Ruttan Live
- 1. "She's Like a Song" Released: September 2011; 2. "Main Street, 1979" Released: March 12, 2012; 3. "My Kind of Freedom" Released: July 2012; 4. "Where the Train Don't Stop" Released: February 2013

Up All Night – Deric Ruttan Live is the first live album by Canadian country music artist Deric Ruttan. It was released on September 20, 2011 by Black T Records and distributed by EMI. It was recorded live at the Calgary Stampede.

Featured musicians on the live portion of the recording are Deric Ruttan - vocals and acoustic guitar, Darren Savard - electric guitar and vocals, Travis Switzer - bass, Denis Dufresne - fiddle and vocals, Matthew Atkins - drums

== Track listing ==
No.	Title	Length
1.	"Intro"	1:29
2.	"Sing That Song Again"	4:15
3.	"Take the Wheel"	4:10
4.	"California Plates"	3:47
5.	"Lovin' You Is Killin' Me"	4:13
6.	"That's How I Wanna Go Out"	4:20
7.	"When You Come Around"	3:52
8.	"First Time in a Long Time"	4:41
9.	"Unbeatable"	4:48
10.	"Up All Night"	4:43
11.	"Are You Sure Hank Done It This Way," "Lot of Leavin' Left to Do," "What Was I Thinkin'" (medley)	9:48
12.	"Good Time"	6:04
13.	"She's Like a Song" (studio recording)	3:01
14.	"Where the Train Don't Stop" (remastered studio recording)	3:36
15.	"My Kind of Freedom" (studio recording)	3:01
16.	"Main Street, 1979" (studio recording)	8:22

== Chart performance ==
=== Singles ===
Year	Single	Peak positions
Year	Single	CAN Country
2011	"She's Like a Song"	—
2012	"Main Street, 1979"	—
2012	"My Kind of Freedom"	—
2013	"Where the Train Don't Stop"	11
"—" denotes releases that did not chart
