= Long Trip Alone =

Studio album by Dierks Bentley
- Released: October 17, 2006
- Genre: Country
- Length: 40:15
- Label: Capitol Records Nashville
- Producer: Brett Beavers

Dierks Bentley chronology
Modern Day Drifter (2005)	Long Trip Alone (2006)	Greatest Hits/Every Mile a Memory 2003–2008 (2008)

Singles from Long Trip Alone
- 1. "Every Mile a Memory" Released: July 17, 2006; 2. "Long Trip Alone" Released: November 13, 2006; 3. "Free and Easy (Down the Road I Go)" Released: June 4, 2007; 4. "Trying to Stop Your Leaving" Released: January 28, 2008

Professional ratings
Review scores
Source	Rating
Allmusic	4/5 stars
Slant	3.5/5 stars

Long Trip Alone is the third studio album by American country music artist Dierks Bentley. It was released October 17, 2006 by Capitol Records Nashville. The album produced four singles on the U.S. Billboard Hot Country Songs charts: "Every Mile a Memory", the title track, "Free and Easy (Down the Road I Go)", and "Trying to Stop Your Leaving". All singles went to the Top 10 on the chart. "Ever Mile a Memory" and "Free and Easy (Down the Road I Go)" both reached number one, the title track peaked at number 10, and "Trying to Stop Your Leaving" went to number 5. Brett Beavers, Bentley’s producer, helped Bentley co-write all of the songs on the album. The album peaked at number 5 on the U.S. Billboard 200 and number 1 on the Top Country Albums chart. It was certified gold by the Recording Industry Association of America (RIAA).

== Track listing ==
All tracks are written by Dierks Bentley and Brett Beavers, with additional co-writers as noted.

No.	Title	Writer(s)	Length
1.	"Every Mile a Memory"	Steve Bogard	3:52
2.	"Can't Live It Down"	Tony Martin	3:23
3.	"Long Trip Alone"	Bogard	3:43
4.	"That Don't Make It Easy Loving Me"	Deric Ruttan	4:09
5.	"Soon as You Can"	Martin	4:00
6.	"Trying to Stop Your Leaving"	Jim Beavers	3:38
7.	"Hope for Me Yet"	Martin	2:56
8.	"The Heaven I'm Headed To"	Paul Nelson	4:31
9.	"Free and Easy (Down the Road I Go)"	Rob Harrington; Rod Janzen	3:19
10.	"Band of Brothers"	J. Beavers	3:44
11.	"Prodigal Son's Prayer"	Ruttan	2:53

Yahoo! version
No.	Title	Writer(s)	Length
12.	"Every Mile a Memory" (Alternate Mix)	Steve Bogard	3:52

Urge version (digital-only)
No.	Title	Writer(s)	Length
12.	"The Heaven I'm Headed To" (Alternate Version)	Paul Nelson	4:42

== Personnel ==
- Dierks Bentley - lead vocals
- Steve Brewster - drums
- Jimmy Carter - bass guitar
- J.T. Corenflos - electric guitar
- Terry Eldredge - acoustic guitar and background vocals on "Prodigal Son's Prayer"
- Rob Harrington - bass guitar on "Free and Easy (Down the Road I Go)"
- Aubrey Haynie - fiddle
- Inmates at Charles Bass Correctional Complex - foot stomping on "Prodigal Son's Prayer"
- Rod Janzen - electric guitar on "Free and Easy (Down the Road I Go)"
- Jamie Johnson - vocals on "Prodigal Son's Prayer"
- Jimmy Mattingly - fiddle on "Prodigal Son's Prayer"
- Steve Misamore - drums on "Free and Easy (Down the Road I Go)"
- Gary Morse - lap steel guitar, pedal steel guitar
- Danny Roberts - mandolin on "Prodigal Son's Prayer"
- Tim Sergent- pedal steel guitar on "Free and Easy (Down the Road I Go)"
- Terry Smith - upright bass on "Pridigal Son's Prayer"
- Bryan Sutton - banjo, bouzouki, acoustic guitar, mandolin
- David Talbot - banjo on "Prodigal Son's Prayer"
- Russell Terrell - background vocals

== Chart performance ==
=== Weekly charts ===
Chart (2006)	Peak position
US Billboard 200	5
US Top Country Albums (Billboard)	1

=== Year-end charts ===
Chart (2007)	Position
US Billboard 200	130
US Top Country Albums (Billboard)	25

=== Singles ===
Year	Single	Peak chart positions			
Year	Single	US Country	US	CAN Country	CAN
2006	"Every Mile a Memory"	1	48	2	—
2006	"Long Trip Alone"	10	66	10	—
2007	"Free and Easy (Down the Road I Go)"	1	46	2	59
2008	"Trying to Stop Your Leaving"	5	73	13	—
"—" denotes releases that did not chart

== Certifications ==
Region	Certification	Certified units/sales
United States (RIAA)	Gold	500,000^{^}
^{^} Shipments figures based on certification alone.
