= Gravel & Gold =

Studio album by Dierks Bentley
- Released: February 24, 2023
- Genre: Country
- Length: 51:16
- Label: Capitol Nashville
- Producer: Dierks Bentley; Brett Beavers; Ross Copperman; Jon Randall; F. Reid Shippen

Dierks Bentley chronology
The Mountain (2018)	Gravel & Gold (2023)	Broken Branches (2025)

Singles from Gravel & Gold
- 1. "Gold" Released: August 8, 2022; 2. "Something Real" Released: June 26, 2023

Gravel & Gold is the tenth studio album by American country music artist Dierks Bentley. It was released February 24, 2023, by Capitol Records Nashville.

== Content ==
Gravel & Gold is Bentley's first studio album in almost five years since 2018's The Mountain. In between, he released two standalone singles, "Gone" and "Beers on Me", which peaked at numbers two and one on the Billboard Country Airplay chart, respectively, and were not included on an album.

"Gold" was released on August 8, 2022, as the album's first single. An article by MusicRow confirmed that the project would include contributions from Ashley McBryde, Billy Strings, as well as bluegrass music artists Sam Bush, Jerry Douglas, Charlie Worsham, and Bryan Sutton.

== Commercial performance ==
Gravel & Gold debuted at No. 14 on Billboard's Top Country Albums and No. 73 on the US Billboard 200, with 12,000 album-equivalent units.

== Critical reception ==
Stephen Thomas Erlewine of AllMusic wrote, "Throughout the record, Bentley sounds relaxed and cozy in his comfort zone, and that sense of ease, when combined with the occasional barn burner, such as the jocular bluegrass closer 'High Note'[...]is a recipe for a good time."

== Track listing ==
No.	Title	Writer(s)	Length
1.	"Same Ol' Me"	Dierks Bentley; Luke Dick; Jon Randall	3:16
2.	"Sun Sets in Colorado"	Ross Copperman; Tommy Lee James; Josh Osborne	3:02
3.	"Heartbreak Drinking Tour"	Bentley; Copperman; Dick; Ashley Gorley; Michael Hardy	3:43
4.	"Something Real"	Bentley; Copperman; Dick; Gorley; Hardy	3:57
5.	"Still"	Bentley; Jeff Hyde; Jeremy Spillman; Ryan Tyndall	3:13
6.	"Beer at My Funeral"	Brett Beavers; Jim Beavers	3:10
7.	"Cowboy Boots" (featuring Ashley McBryde)	Bentley; Casey Brown; Jordan Minton; Hunter Phelps	4:33
8.	"Gold"	Bentley; Copperman; Dick; Gorley	2:47
9.	"Walking Each Other Home"	Bentley; Dick; Osborne	3:45
10.	"Roll On"	Bentley; B. Beavers; J. Beavers	3:06
11.	"All the Right Places"	Bentley; Copperman; Osborne	3:58
12.	"Ain't All Bad"	Bentley; Brown; Minton; Phelps	3:43
13.	"Old Pickup"	Michael Dulaney; Tony Martin; Neil Thrasher	3:22
14.	"High Note" (featuring Billy Strings)	J. Beavers; Charlie Worsham	5:33
Total length:			51:16

== Personnel ==
Credits adapted from Tidal.

=== Musicians ===
- Dierks Bentley – vocals (all tracks), background vocals (track 8)
- Charlie Worsham – acoustic guitar (all tracks), mandolin (track 1), background vocals (10, 12, 13)
- Aaron Sterling – drums (all tracks), percussion (tracks 1–4, 6–13), programming (4)
- Jedd Hughes – electric guitar
- Bryan Sutton – acoustic guitar (tracks 1–5, 7–14), banjo (2, 6, 14), mandolin (2, 11)
- Sam Bush – mandolin (tracks 1, 2, 7, 8, 10, 14)
- Dan Dugmore – pedal steel (tracks 1, 3–6, 8–11), electric guitar (3, 4)
- Lex Price – bass (tracks 1, 3, 4, 6–14)
- Danny Rader – electric guitar (tracks 1, 3, 4, 8, 9, 11, 14), banjo (3, 4), acoustic guitar (4, 8, 14), mandolin (4), keyboards (11)
- F. Reid Shippen – programming (tracks 1, 3, 8, 9, 11, 13, 14), background vocals (9, 11)
- Luke Dick – background vocals (tracks 1, 8–10)
- Ross Copperman – programming (tracks 2, 3), background vocals (2), percussion (3), electric guitar (10)
- Jimmy Wallace – keyboards (tracks 2, 3, 5, 7, 9, 12–14)
- Dan Hochhalter – fiddle (tracks 2, 13, 14)
- Craig Young – bass (track 2)
- Andy Leftwich – fiddle (track 2)
- Trey Keller – background vocals (tracks 3, 7)
- Rob McNelley – acoustic guitar, electric guitar (track 3)
- Micah Wilshire – background vocals (tracks 4, 11)
- Hardy – background vocals (track 4)
- Jon Randall – acoustic guitar (tracks 5, 7, 13), electric guitar (5, 7), background vocals (5, 9–11, 13), percussion (5), mandolin (14)
- Chad Cromwell – drums (tracks 5, 14), percussion (5)
- Ben Helson – background vocals (track 6), electric guitar (10), acoustic guitar (14)
- Paul Franklin – pedal steel (tracks 7, 12, 13)
- Jason Carter – fiddle (track 7)
- Ashley McBryde – vocals (track 7)
- Sarah Buxton – background vocals (track 9)
- Brett Beavers – background vocals (track 10)
- Jerry Douglas – Dobro (track 10)
- Brent Mason – electric guitar (tracks 12, 13)
- Billy Strings – acoustic guitar, vocals (track 14)

=== Technical ===
- F. Reid Shippen – production, mixing, engineering
- Ross Copperman – production (all tracks), engineering (tracks 1–7, 9–14)
- Dierks Bentley – production
- Jon Randall – production
- Brett Beavers – production (tracks 6, 10, 14)
- Pete Lyman – mastering
- Jason Lehning – engineering (tracks 3, 6, 9, 10)
- Brian David Willis – editing
- Austin Atwood – engineering assistance
- Brandon Towles – engineering assistance
- Ethan Barrette – engineering assistance (tracks 2, 4, 5, 7–9, 12–14)
- Joe Trentacosti – engineering assistance (tracks 3, 6, 9, 10, 14)
- Scott Johnson – production coordination

== Charts ==
Chart performance for Gravel & Gold
Chart (2023)	Peak position
US Billboard 200	73
US Top Country Albums (Billboard)	14
