= Feel That Fire =

Studio album by Dierks Bentley
- Released: February 3, 2009
- Genre: Country
- Length: 46:31
- Label: Capitol Records Nashville
- Producer: Brett Beavers; Dierks Bentley

Dierks Bentley chronology
Greatest Hits/Every Mile a Memory 2003–2008 (2008)	Feel That Fire (2009)	Up on the Ridge (2010)

Singles from Feel That Fire
- 1. "Feel That Fire" Released: September 29, 2008; 2. "Sideways" Released: March 2, 2009; 3. "I Wanna Make You Close Your Eyes" Released: July 27, 2009

Professional ratings
Review scores
Source	Rating
Allmusic	2/5 stars
Slant Magazine	2/5 stars
USA Today	3/4 stars
Entertainment Weekly	A−

Feel That Fire is the fourth studio album by American country music artist Dierks Bentley. It was released on February 3, 2009, by Capitol Records Nashville. The album produced three singles with the title track, "Sideways", and "I Wanna Make You Close Your Eyes". The first two reached number one on the U.S. Billboard Hot Country Songs chart, while the third peaked at number 2. The album reached number one the U.S. Billboard Top Country Albums chart. It was also certified gold by the Recording Industry Association of America and has even sold over 327,000 copies as of 2010.

== Content ==
As with all of his previous albums, Bentley co-produced this one with Brett Beavers. Bentley co-wrote most of this album's songs along with both Brett and Jim Beavers, the latter of whom is Brett's brother. "I Can't Forget Her" is one of the album's only two songs that Bentley did not co-write. That song was previously recorded by Clay Walker on his 2003 album A Few Questions.

The title track, which Bentley and Brett Beavers co-wrote with The Warren Brothers (Brad and Brett Warren), was the album's first single. That song became Bentley's sixth number one hit on the U.S. Billboard Hot Country Songs chart in early 2009. The album's second single "Sideways", which Bentley co-wrote with Jim Beavers, became the singer's seventh number one hit in July 2009.

The album has received many positive reviews and put in many "Best Country Albums of 2009". The Chicago Tribune ranked it No. 1 on their list of the best country albums of the year.

The song "Beautiful World" was nominated for Best Country Collaboration w/ Vocals at the 52nd Grammy Awards.

== Track listing ==
No.	Title	Writer(s)	Length
1.	"Life on the Run"	Brett Beavers; Jim Beavers; Dierks Bentley	3:47
2.	"Sideways"	J. Beavers; Bentley	3:04
3.	"Feel That Fire"	B. Beavers; Bentley; Brad Warren; Brett Warren	3:21
4.	"I Wanna Make You Close Your Eyes"	B. Beavers; Bentley	3:59
5.	"Here She Comes"	B. Beavers; J. Beavers; Bentley	4:28
6.	"I Can't Forget Her"	Bart Butler; Mark A. Rone; Frank Solesbee	4:15
7.	"Beautiful World" (feat. Patty Griffin)	B. Beavers; J. Beavers; Bentley	3:14
8.	"Little Heartwrecker"	B. Beavers; Bentley; Steve Bogard	3:26
9.	"You Hold Me Together"	B. Beavers; Bentley; Tony Martin	3:57
10.	"Better Believer"	Bentley; Rivers Rutherford	4:15
11.	"Pray"	Bentley; Rodney Crowell	4:19
12.	"Last Call" (feat. Ronnie McCoury)	Ronnie McCoury	4:26
Total length:			46:31

== Personnel ==
- Alan Bartram – upright bass (12)
- Brett Beavers – banjo (3)
- Caleb Beavers – gang vocals (2)
- Emily Beavers – gang vocals (2)
- Liz Beavers – gang vocals (2)
- Dierks Bentley – lead vocals (all tracks)
- Steve Brewster – drums (2,4,5,6,7,8,9,11), percussion (2,5,6)
- Jason Carter – fiddle (12)
- Jimmy Carter – bass guitar (except 10 and 12)
- Joanna Carter – gang vocals (2)
- J.T. Corenflos – electric guitar (except 10 and 12)
- Mike Dungan – gang vocals (2)
- Patty Griffin – duet vocals (7), background vocals (7)
- Jimmy Harnen – gang vocals (2)
- Rob Harrington – bass guitar (10), space bass (1)
- Lona Heins – background vocals (4,7,11)
- Steve Hodge – gang vocals (2)
- Autumn House – gang vocals (2)
- Rod Janzen – electric guitar (1,10), Danelectro guitar (10)
- Mike Johnson – pedal steel guitar (3)
- Charlie Judge – keyboards (3,4,6,9,11), percussion (6)
- Randy Kohrs – dobro (8,12)
- Rob McCoury – banjo (12)
- Ronnie McCoury – mandolin (12), background vocals (12)
- Mike McCready – electric guitar (1)
- Greg Magnum – background vocals (1), gang vocals (2)
- Steve Misamore – drums (1,3,10), percussion (1)
- Gary Morse – lap steel guitar (1,5), pedal steel guitar (2,4,6,7,9,10,11)
- Bryan Sutton – banjo (1,2,7,8,9), bouzouki (10,11), acoustic guitar (all tracks), gut string guitar (6), mandolin (9)
- Russell Terrell – background vocals (except 7 and 12)

== Chart performance ==
=== Weekly charts ===
Chart (2009)	Peak position
US Billboard 200	3
US Top Country Albums (Billboard)	1

=== Year-end charts ===
Chart (2009)	Position
US Billboard 200	127
US Top Country Albums (Billboard)	26
Chart (2010)	Position
US Top Country Albums (Billboard)	71

=== Singles ===
Year	Single	Peak chart positions				Certifications (sales threshold)
Year	Single	US Country	US	CAN Country	CAN	Certifications (sales threshold)
2008	"Feel That Fire"	1	32	2	54	* US: Gold
2009	"Sideways"	1	35	4	63	* US: Gold
2009	"I Wanna Make You Close Your Eyes"	2	52	12	92	

== Certifications ==
Region	Certification	Certified units/sales
United States (RIAA)	Gold	500,000^{‡}
^{‡} Sales+streaming figures based on certification alone.
