= Modern Day Drifter =

Studio album by Dierks Bentley
- Released: May 10, 2005
- Genre: Country
- Length: 42:53
- Label: Capitol Records Nashville
- Producer: Brett Beavers

Dierks Bentley chronology
Dierks Bentley (2003)	Modern Day Drifter (2005)	Long Trip Alone (2006)

Singles from Modern Day Drifter
- 1. "Lot of Leavin' Left to Do" Released: January 11, 2005; 2. "Come a Little Closer" Released: July 18, 2005; 3. "Settle for a Slowdown" Released: January 24, 2006

Professional ratings
Review scores
Source	Rating
Allmusic	3.5/5 stars

Modern Day Drifter is the second studio album by American country music artist Dierks Bentley. It was released on May 10, 2005 by Capitol Records Nashville. The album produced three singles on the U.S. Billboard Hot Country Songs chart with the number 3 hit "Lot of Leavin' Left to Do" and the number ones "Come a Little Closer" and "Settle for a Slowdown". The album was certified platinum by the Recording Industry Association of America (RIAA) and has sold over 1.5 million copies in the United States.

== Track listing ==
No.	Title	Writer(s)	Length
1.	"Lot of Leavin' Left to Do"	Deric Ruttan; Brett Beavers; Dierks Bentley	4:32
2.	"Come a Little Closer"	B. Beavers; Bentley	4:42
3.	"Cab of My Truck"	B. Beavers; Mark Nesler; Bentley	3:39
4.	"Settle for a Slowdown"	B. Beavers; Tony Martin; Bentley	3:43
5.	"Domestic, Light and Cold"	B. Beavers; Bentley	4:00
6.	"Good Things Happen"	Jamie Hartford	3:45
7.	"Down on Easy Street"	B. Beavers; Steve Bogard; Bentley	3:30
8.	"So So Long"	B. Beavers; Jim Beavers; Bentley	3:24
9.	"Modern Day Drifter"	John Scott Sherrill; Wyatt Easterling	4:10
10.	"Good Man Like Me"	Del McCoury	3:07
11.	"Gonna Get There Someday"	B. Beavers; Ruttan; Bentley	4:14
Total length:			42:53

== Chart performance ==
=== Weekly charts ===
Chart (2005)	Peak position
US Billboard 200	6
US Top Country Albums (Billboard)	1

=== Year-end charts ===
Chart (2005)	Position
US Billboard 200	146
US Top Country Albums (Billboard)	26
Chart (2006)	Position
US Billboard 200	65
US Top Country Albums (Billboard)	18

=== Singles ===
Year	Single	Peak positions		
Year	Single	US Country	US	CAN
2005	"Lot of Leavin' Left to Do"	3	47	—
2005	"Come a Little Closer"	1	31	—
2006	"Settle for a Slowdown"	1	42	43

== Certifications ==
Region	Certification
Canada (Music Canada)	Gold
United States (RIAA)	Platinum

== Personnel ==
- Dierks Bentley – lead vocals
- Steve Brewster – drums
- Jimmy Carter – bass guitar
- J. T. Corenflos – electric guitar, Danelectro
- Aubrey Haynie — fiddle
- Lona Heins – background vocals
- Wes Hightower – background vocals
- Rod Janzen – electric guitar
- Randy Kohrs – Dobro
- Alison Krauss – background vocals
- Gary Morse – Sho-Bud pedal steel guitar, lap steel guitar
- Michelle Poe – background vocals
- Steve Sheehan – acoustic guitar
- Bryan Sutton – acoustic guitar, banjo, mandolin
- Russell Terrell – background vocals

=== Del McCoury Band (on Track 10) ===
- Mike Bub – upright bass
- Jason Carter – fiddle
- Del McCoury – acoustic guitar, background vocals
- Rob McCoury – banjo
- Ronnie McCoury – mandolin, background vocals
