= Up on the Ridge =

Studio album by Dierks Bentley
- Released: June 8, 2010
- Genre: Country
- Length: 43:32
- Label: Capitol Records Nashville
- Producer: Jon Randall

Dierks Bentley chronology
Feel That Fire (2009)	Up on the Ridge (2010)	Home (2012)

Singles from Up on the Ridge
- 1. "Up on the Ridge" Released: April 12, 2010; 2. "Draw Me a Map" Released: August 23, 2010

Up on the Ridge is the fifth studio album by American country music artist Dierks Bentley. It was released on June 8, 2010, by Capitol Records Nashville. The album produced two singles on the US Billboard Hot Country Songs chart with the title track and "Draw Me a Map".

== Content ==
Unlike Bentley's previous albums, this album is a bluegrass-influenced album, mixed with country and Americana. It features many collaborations, including The Del McCoury Band, Alison Krauss, Chris Thile, and Miranda Lambert. Via his website, Bentley explained the reason behind Up on the Ridge, saying: “This album won’t come as a surprise to my hard core fans, they've asked me: ‘when are you going to make a bluegrass record?’ And I was just waiting for the right time. I didn't want this to be ‘Dierks Bentley and friends’ or a ‘Dierks does bluegrass’ kind of album. I wanted each song to have something special about it, and in the end I think each song really does have its own thing going on.”

In an interview with Billboard Magazine, Capitol Records Nashville president and CEO Mike Dungan commented on Up on the Ridge saying that "The album was supposed to be a side project, but it's grown into something much more....He had a real sense of direction and made a vehicle for people to hopefully discover this music".

== Singles ==
The title track is the first single from this album and was sent to radio stations on April 12, and debuted at #59 on the U.S. Billboard Hot Country Songs chart for the week of May 1, 2010. The song later peaked at #21 in late July 2010, making it the first single of Bentley's career to miss the Top 20 and the second to miss the Top 10, after My Last Name (from his self titled debut album) at No.17 in 2003. The second single from the album, "Draw Me a Map," was released to country radio on August 23, 2010. It was even less successful than the title track, with a peak of #33, becoming his third-lowest charting single to date, after "What the Hell Did I Say" from his album Black, which peaked at #35 on Hot Country Songs and #46 on the Country Airplay chart.

== Promotion ==
To promote his new album, Bentley started his Up on the Ridge Tour. The 24 show tour began in Portland, Oregon on April 21, 2010, and it continued through May 22, 2010, where it ended in Nashville, Tennessee.

Bentley also premiered the title song, and first single, on The Tonight Show with Jay Leno on April 27, 2010.

== Reception ==
=== Commercial ===
The album debuted at number nine on the U.S. Billboard 200, number two on the U.S. Billboard Top Country Albums chart, and at number one on the U.S. Billboard Bluegrass Albums chart, selling nearly 39,000 copies in its first week of release. As of February 12, 2012, the album sold 244,000 copies in the US.

=== Critical ===
Professional ratings
Review scores
Source	Rating
Allmusic	4/5 stars
American Songwriter	3.5/5 stars
Billboard	(favorable)
Country Weekly	4.5/5 stars
PopMatters	8/10 stars
Rolling Stone	3/5 stars
Slant Magazine	4.5/5 stars
Engine 145	3.5/5 stars

Upon its release, Up on the Ridge received very positive reviews from most music critics. At Metacritic, which assigns a normalized rating out of 100 to reviews from mainstream critics, the album received an average score of 80, based on 7 reviews, which indicates "generally favorable reviews".

Jessica Phillips with Country Weekly magazine rated the album four and a half stars out of five. She praised the sound of the album, saying that it "is built on a bedrock of bluegrass sensibility, but is colored by Dierks' various country, rock and folk influences." Jonathan Keefe with Slant Magazine also rated the album with four and a half out of five stars, commenting that the album's "overall aesthetic... proves Bentley's deep respect for— and his legitimate, intuitive understanding of— country traditions, even as he uses those traditions in forward-thinking, progressive ways."

Stephen Thomas Erlewine with Allmusic gave it four stars, and said it wasn't a traditional bluegrass album, saying "The very presence of a U2 song suggests that this is not a traditional bluegrass album, either in its content -- or in its approach, as he sometimes puts picking in the backseat, letting the instruments strum sweetly as he croons." Wade Jessen with Billboard called it "a thrilling ride from start to finish" and called the track "Down in the Mine" "the standout track".

==== Accolades ====
Year	Association	Category	Result
2010	Country Music Association Awards	Album of the Year	Nominated
2011	Grammy Awards	Best Country Album	Nominated
2011	Academy of Country Music Awards	Album of the Year	Nominated

== Track listing ==
No.	Title	Writer(s)	Length
1.	"Up on the Ridge"	Dierks Bentley, Angelo Petraglia	3:34
2.	"Fallin' for You"	Shawn Camp, Paul Kennerley	3:44
3.	"Señor (Tales of Yankee Power)" (with Chris Thile and Punch Brothers)	Bob Dylan	3:24
4.	"Rovin' Gambler" (with Punch Brothers)	public domain; arr. by Bentley and Jon Randall	2:34
5.	"Draw Me a Map"	Bentley, Randall	3:31
6.	"Bad Angel" (featuring Miranda Lambert & Jamey Johnson)	Verlon Thompson, Suzi Ragsdale	4:04
7.	"Fiddlin' Around"	John Scott Sherrill, Camp, Jeff Austin	3:08
8.	"You're Dead to Me"	Bentley, Randall, Tim O'Brien	3:19
9.	"Pride (In the Name of Love)" (with Punch Brothers and Del McCoury)	Adam Clayton, Larry Mullen, Dave Evans, Paul David Hewson	4:09
10.	"Love Grows Wild"	Julie Miller, Buddy Miller	2:48
11.	"Bottle to the Bottom" (featuring Kris Kristofferson)	Kristofferson	4:16
12.	"Down in the Mine"	Bentley, Randall	5:01

== Personnel ==
Production

- Brandon Bell - Assistant Engineer, Engineer, Mixing Assistant
- Joanna Carter - Art Direction
- Danny Clinch - Photography
- Michelle Hall - Art Producer
- Jeri Heiden - Design
- John Heiden - Design
- Scott Johnson - Production Assistant
- Ben Liscio - Assistant Engineer, Mixing Assistant
- Sangwook "Sunny" Nam - Mastering Associate
- Gary Paczosa - Engineer, Mixing
- Doug Sax - Mastering

Musicians

- Larry Atamanuik - drums (1, 5, 6), percussion (1)
- Mike Bub - bass (1, 5, 8, 12)
- Sam Bush - resonator mandolin (1), mandolin (10), fiddle (10)
- Jason Carter - fiddle (8, 12)
- Stuart Duncan - octave fiddle (1), fiddle (2, 5–8, 11, 12), pedal banjo (2), cello (5)
- Chris Eldridge - acoustic guitar (3, 4, 9)
- John Gardner - drums (2, 7, 10, 11), percussion (2)
- Rob Ickes - Weissenborn (2), Dobro (7, 10, 11)
- Randy Kohrs - tricone Dobro (5), metal-body Dobro (6), Weissenborn (12)
- Paul Kowert - bass (3, 4, 9)
- Ronnie McCoury - mandola (1, 2), mandolin (5, 6, 7, 11)
- Tim O'Brien - mandolin (8, 12)
- Angelo Petraglia - acoustic guitar (1)
- Noam Pikelny - banjo (3, 4, 9)
- Jon Randall - bass (1), electric guitar (10), acoustic guitar (10)
- Bryan Sutton - resonator guitar (1), acoustic guitar (2, 5–8, 10–12)
- Chris Thile - mandolin (3, 4, 9)
- Guthrie Trapp - electric guitar (7)
- Scott Vestal - banjo (1, 5, 8), MIDI banjo (5)
- Gabe Witcher - fiddle (3, 4, 9)
- Glenn Worf - bass (2, 6, 10, 11)

Backing vocalists

- Sam Bush (10)
- Sonya Isaacs (12)
- Alison Krauss (1, 5)
- Jon Randall (1, 4, 10–12)
- Chris Stapleton (2)
- Chris Thile (3, 4)
- Gabe Witcher (4)
- Vince Gill (7)
- Tim O'Brien (8)

== Chart performance ==
=== Album ===
Chart (2010)	Peak position	Year-end 2010
US Billboard 200	9	197
US Billboard Top Bluegrass Albums	1	1
US Billboard Top Country Albums	2	39
