= The K Is Silent =

Studio album by Hot Country Knights
- Released: May 1, 2020
- Genre: Country, parody
- Length: 36:49
- Label: Capitol Nashville
- Producer: Dierks Bentley

Singles from The K Is Silent
- 1. "Pick Her Up" Released: January 23, 2020

The K Is Silent is the debut studio album of the American country music band Hot Country Knights. The band is led by Dierks Bentley (under his alter-ego) and is a parody of country music, specifically 1990s-era country. It was released on May 1, 2020 via Capitol Records Nashville.

== Content ==
The album includes the lead single "Pick Her Up", a duet with Travis Tritt. Dierks Bentley, who performs on the album in-character as Douglas "Doug" Douglasson, produced the album.

== Critical reception ==
Giving it 4.5 out of 5 stars, Stephen Thomas Erlewine called it "a parody album that can also hold its own with the songs it sends up" and "This blend of brains, brawn, and bawdiness all sounds invigorating when delivered by this band of bozos".

== Track listing ==
No.	Title	Writer(s)	Length
1.	"Hot Country Knights"	Brett Beavers; Jim Beavers; Cassady Feasby; Ben Helson; Dan Hochhalter; Chase McGill; Steve Misamore; Jon Nite; Jon Randall; Tim Sergent; Brett Tyler; Dierks Bentley	2:56
2.	"Pick Her Up" (featuring Travis Tritt)	Bentley; B. Beavers; J. Beavers	4:10
3.	"Asphalt"	J. Beavers; Nite; Tyler	4:09
4.	"Moose Knuckle Shuffle"	B. Beavers; J. Beavers; Buddy Brock; Hochhalter; McGill; Zack Turner; Tyler	3:07
5.	"Then It Rained"	B. Beavers; Nite; Randall	3:25
6.	"Wrangler Danger"	Bentley; B. Beavers; J. Beavers	3:18
7.	"Mull It Over"	Bentley; J. Beavers; Randall	3:36
8.	"Kings of Neon"	Bentley; B. Beavers; McGill	3:10
9.	"You Make It Hard" (featuring Terri Clark)	Bentley; B.Beavers; J. Beavers; Mary Hilliard Harrington; Randall; Luke Wooten	3:22
10.	"The USA Begins with Us"	Bentley; B. Beavers; J. Beavers	5:36
Total length:			36:49

== Personnel ==
Adapted from The K Is Silent liner notes.

Musicians

- Brett Beavers - background vocals
- Jim Beavers - acoustic guitar, background vocals
- Terri Clark - duet vocals on "You Make It Hard"
- Douglas "Doug" Douglason - vocals, whistling
- Terotej "Terry" Dvoraczekynski - fiddle, keytar, background vocals
- Monte Montgomery - drums, percussion, background vocals
- Billy Nobel - keyboards
- Marty Ray "Rayro" Roburn - acoustic guitar, electric guitar, background vocals, whistling
- Trevor Travis - vocals, bass guitar, whistling
- Travis Tritt - duet vocals on "Pick Her Up"
- Barry Van Ricky - pedal steel guitar
- Luke Wooten - background vocals

Technical

- Brett Beavers - production assistant
- Jim Beavers - production assistant
- Dierks Bentley - producer
- Scott Johnson - production coordinator
- Jon Randall - production assistant
- Ryan Smith - mastering
- Austin Stanley - recording assistant
- Luke Wooten - recording, mixing
