= Take the Week Off =

Studio album by Deric Ruttan
- Released: October 15, 2013
- Genre: Country
- Length: 41:29
- Label: Black T/Universal
- Producer: Deric Ruttan; Luke Wooten

Deric Ruttan chronology
Up All Night – Deric Ruttan Live (2011)	Take the Week Off (2013)

Singles from Take the Week Off
- 1. "Take the Week Off" Released: August 2013; 2. "Pass It Around" Released: January 2014; 3. "Country Mile" Released: June 2014; 4. "Good Thing Gone" Released: September 2014; 5. "Don't It Feel Good" Released: April 2015

Professional ratings
Review scores
Source	Rating
Top Country	4/5 stars

Take the Week Off is the fourth studio album by Canadian country music artist Deric Ruttan. It was released on October 15, 2013 by Black T Records/Universal Music Canada. Ruttan wrote or co-wrote all twelve tracks.

== Critical reception ==
Shenieka Russell-Metcalf of Top Country gave the album four stars out of five, writing that "the twelve track album delivers some real good tunes."

== Track listing ==
No.	Title	Writer(s)	Length
1.	"Pass It Around"	Deric Ruttan, Derek George	3:29
2.	"Take the Week Off"	Ruttan, Ryan Tyndell	2:59
3.	"City Lights"	Ruttan, Jonathan Singleton	3:39
4.	"Don't It Feel Good"	Ruttan, Singleton	3:20
5.	"The Space Between"	Ruttan, Tia Sillers	3:46
6.	"Hey Paulina"	Ruttan, Rodney Clawson, Marv Green, Tim Nichols	3:04
7.	"What a Memory"	Ruttan	2:36
8.	"Happy Place"	Ruttan, David Lee	3:28
9.	"Good Thing Gone"	Ruttan, Brett Beavers	3:47
10.	"Mine Would Be You"	Ruttan, Jessi Alexander, Connie Harrington	3:54
11.	"Country Mile"	Ruttan, Mark Nesler	3:21
12.	"Hometown"	Ruttan, Alexander, Harrington	4:06
Total length:			41:29

== Chart performance ==
=== Singles ===
Year	Single	Peak chart positions	
Year	Single	CAN Country	CAN
2013	"Take the Week Off"	10	66
2014	"Pass It Around"	17	—
2014	"Country Mile"	—	—
2014	"Good Thing Gone"	42	—
2015	"Don't It Feel Good"	—	—
"—" denotes releases that did not chart
