= Lauren Elaine =

American fashion designer, actress, and model (born 1983)

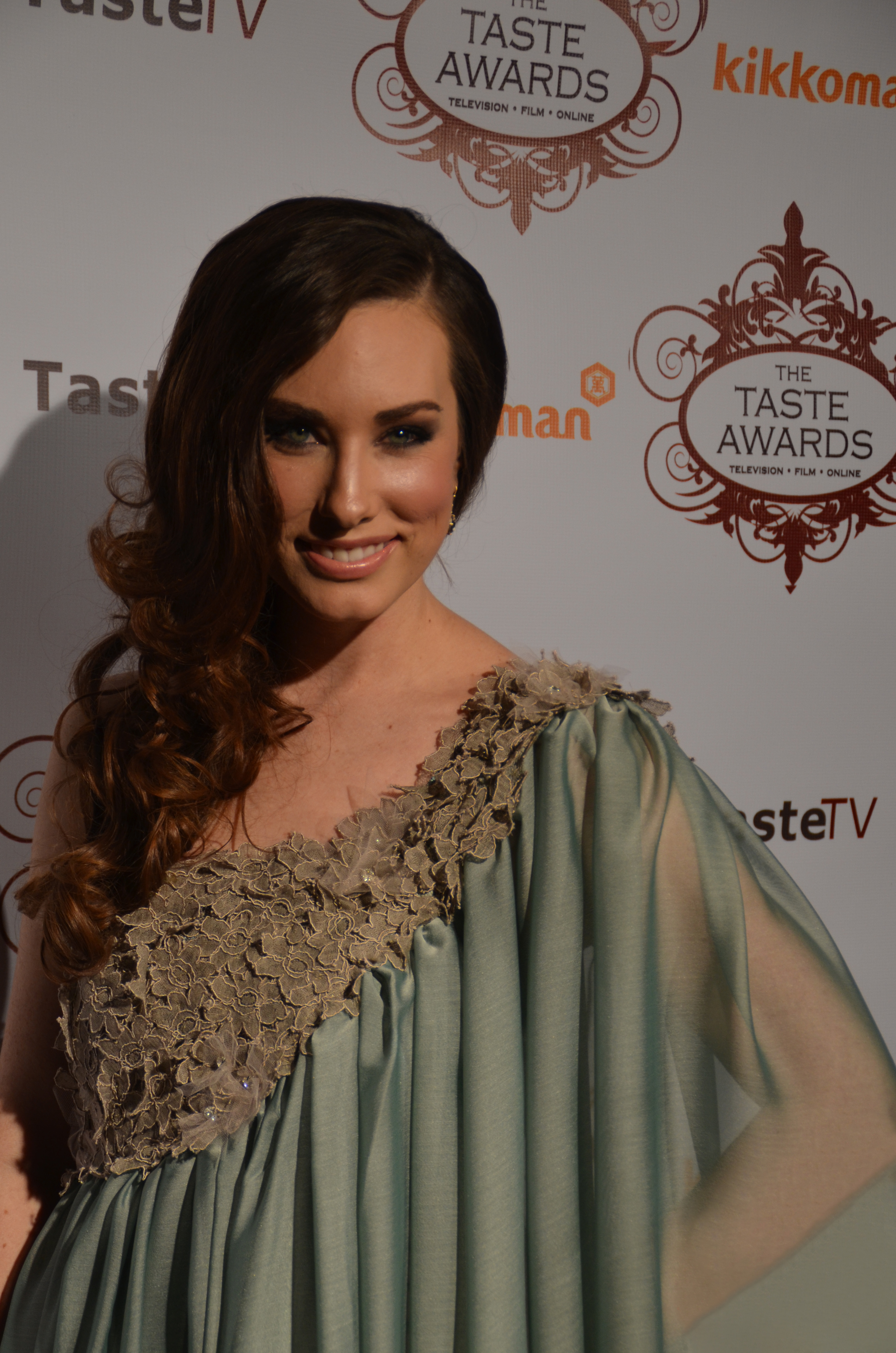
- Lauren Elaine at the 6th Annual Taste Awards
- Born: November 7, 1983 (age 42); Poway, California, United States

Lauren Elaine (born November 7, 1983) is an American fashion designer, actress, and model. As a designer, she has appeared as a guest on America's Next Top Model. As an actress, she has appeared in Fox Searchlight's The Ringer (as "Brandi") and in Miramax's Sin City. She appeared in Dierks Bentley's music videos as "Becky" in "What Was I Thinkin'", "How Am I Doin'", "Lot of Leavin' Left to Do" and "Am I the Only One".

== Early career ==
Born in San Diego, Elaine (née Edleson) was discovered at a local shopping mall at the age of 12. She was soon signed to the Californian modeling agency LA Models and began modeling for such clients as Chanel, Teen and Seventeen magazines, and Nordstrom. She graduated in the top of her class from Poway High School in 2002, turning down opportunities to model abroad in order to attend the University of Texas at Austin, from which she graduated early in 2005. She is a member of Kappa Delta sorority.

Elaine's first big break in the entertainment industry was in 2003, when she was cast in the role of "Becky", the white tank-top-wearing beauty in Dierks Bentley's first video "What Was I Thinking". The video reached #1 on the CMT charts and the song on the Billboard charts, leading to three further appearances as Becky in successive videos. After this exposure, Elaine went on to have movie roles in Fox Searchlight's The Ringer and Miramax's Sin City.

== Career ==
After moving to Los Angeles, Elaine took the lead role in Blue Water Entertainment's Memphis Rising, scheduled for a 2012 release date. In October 2009, she launched the "Lauren Elaine" brand at Los Angeles Fashion Week. The brand was well-received at LA Fashion Week 2010, as was her SS2011 "Art of Fashion" presentation. In 2010, Elaine became the first designer to present a couture runway show at sea, chosen by Crystal Cruises above more established designers including Vera Wang and Michael Kors. In the following year, she headlined San Diego Women's Week and appeared with Tyra Banks and Nicki Minaj as a guest designer on America's Next Top Model: Allstars.

In addition to her couture Black Label Collection, Elaine unveiled a Swim Collection in Hollywood in 2010 and the Laine by Lauren Elaine collection in 2013.
