= Broken Branches (album) =

Studio album by Dierks Bentley
- Released: June 13, 2025
- Genre: Country; bluegrass; alternative
- Length: 36:31
- Label: Capitol Nashville
- Producer: Jon Randall; Ross Copperman

Dierks Bentley chronology
Gravel & Gold (2023)	Broken Branches (2025)

Singles from Broken Branches
- 1. "She Hates Me" Released: February 14, 2025

Broken Branches is the eleventh studio album by American country music artist Dierks Bentley. It was released on June 13, 2025, through Capitol Records Nashville.

== Background and recording ==
The creation of Broken Branches began following the release of Bentley's tenth studio album, Gravel & Gold, as he sought to explore new emotional and sonic territories. Songwriting sessions began in mid-2023, collaborating with longtime co-writers like Brett Beavers, Devin Dawson, and Ashley Gorley along with new contributors.

Bentley stated he listened to nearly 4,000 songs before selecting seven for the album, in addition to four he co-wrote, aiming to highlight overlooked and unique pieces referring to songs like "Standing in the Sun". Saying, "Not the real popular ones, the songs that are the forgotten misfits that say something kind of quirky and weird, and then seeing what we can do with them. I love finding great music".

The album was recorded beginning in early 2024 and reflects Bentley's desire to embrace authenticity and imperfection. According to Bentley, each track grew from an acoustic-guitar foundation in whatever direction "felt right", guided by producers Jon Randall and Ross Copperman. Key contributing musicians include Charlie Worsham, Jedd Hughes, Rob McNelley, and Bryan Sutton.

Bentley has described the album as a representation of "what country music is" to him, emphasizing community spirit and individuality: "The country music community has a lot of broken branches in it. That's why we're all here... This is the people's music, and it represents that spirit of individuality so well." The final tracklist includes four songs co-written by Bentley and seven from outside writers, a process he described as digging "deeper than ever" into Nashville's songwriting community. He emphasized his desire to find "the forgotten misfits that say something kind of quirky and weird".

== Content ==
The album comprises 11 tracks blending country, bluegrass, and grunge-inspired alt-country. Thematically, the songs celebrate outliers, misfits, emotional resilience, and imperfect beauty. The title track, "Broken Branches" serves as the album's anchor, featuring both John Anderson and rising artist Riley Green. It has been described as a "mood-boosting jukebox stomp" honoring black sheep across generations.

"Cold Beer Can" offers a meditative twist on a standard drinking song, while the banjo-led "Near You" featuring Miranda Lambert tributes an essential life companion. “Well Well Whiskey” returns Bentley to his bluegrass roots with a feverish pace. “Jesus Loves Me” explores heartbreak with gospel undertones in a grunge-influenced style, while "Off the Map" reflects quiet escape. "Something Worth Fixing" is described as a propulsive acoustic jam that highlights life's imperfections as part of its beauty.

“Standing in the Sun” radiates the energy of true romance, and “For as Long as I Can Remember” is a tribute to fatherhood. "Don't Cry for Me" brings the album full circle with emotional closure.

== Singles ==
"She Hates Me" was released as the lead single on February 14, 2025, and marked the highest-debuting single of Bentley's career. The track blends elements of Keith Whitley and Weezer, with Billboard describing it as containing Bentley's “trademark humor” with a subtle post-grunge homage to the 2001 single "She Hates Me" by Puddle of Mudd.

"Cold Beer Can", "Well Well Whiskey", and "Standing in the Sun" were released as promotional singles ahead of the album.

== Promotion ==
To coincide with the album's official announcement, Bentley launched the Broken Branches Fund, a charitable initiative named after the album. The fund was established to support individuals and families facing hardship in rural communities, reflecting the album's themes of resilience, community, and individuality. Bentley described the fund as a way to give back to the very people whose lives and stories inspired much of the record.

In support of the album's release, Bentley launched the 30-city Broken Branches Tour on May 29, 2025, with opening acts including Zach Top and The Band Loula.

== Track listing ==
Broken Branches track listing
No.	Title	Writer(s)	Length
1.	"Cold Beer Can" (featuring Stephen Wilson Jr.)	Jon Randall; Luke Dick; Stephen Wilson Jr.; Dierks Bentley	2:43
2.	"Jesus Loves Me"	Adam James; Ben Stennis; Allison Veltz Cruz	3:25
3.	"She Hates Me"	Ashley Gorley; Chase McGill; Ross Copperman; Jimmy Allen; Wes Scantlin; Bentley	2:50
4.	"Something Worth Fixing"	Wilson Jr.; Dick; Bentley	3:11
5.	"Standing in the Sun"	Kyle Sturrock	3:46
6.	"Well Well Whiskey"	Seth Ennis; Devin Dawson; Jordan Reynolds	3:34
7.	"Broken Branches" (featuring John Anderson and Riley Green)	Zach Abend; Beau Bailey; Graham Barham	3:17
8.	"Off the Map"	Jeremy Bussey; Lauren McLamb; Adam Wood	3:12
9.	"Never You" (featuring Miranda Lambert)	Scooter Carusoe; Copperman; Ben Williams	3:36
10.	"For as Long as I Can Remember"	Dawson; Connie Harrington	3:50
11.	"Don't Cry for Me"	Jim Beavers; Bentley	3:03
Total length:			36:31

Broken Branches extended edition
No.	Title	Writer(s)	Length
12.	"IYKYK"	Beavers; Bentley	2:40
13.	"All Night to Figure It Out"	Stennis; Brad Rempel; Jeremy Spillman	3:07
Total length:			42:19

== Personnel ==
Credits adapted from Tidal.

=== Musicians ===
- Dierks Bentley – lead vocals (all tracks), electric guitar (track 2), background vocals (3, 9)
- Ross Copperman – background vocals (1, 4, 5, 8, 9, 11), keyboards (2, 3), programming (2, 3, 9), electric guitar (3, 8), banjo (3); bass, percussion (5)
- Bryan Sutton – acoustic guitar (1–3, 6, 10, 11), mandolin (2, 6), guitar (6), banjo (11)
- Jedd Hughes – electric guitar (1–3, 5, 6, 8, 10, 11)
- F. Reid Shippen – programming (1–3, 5, 6, 9, 11)
- Jimmy Wallace – keyboards (1–3, 5, 10, 11), Hammond B3 (6)
- Chad Cromwell – drums (1–3, 6, 9–11), percussion (2, 3, 6, 9, 11)
- Michael Rinne – bass (1, 10, 11)
- Stephen Wilson Jr. – acoustic guitar, lead vocals (1)
- Craig Young – bass (2–4, 6–9)
- Jon Randall – background vocals (2, 3, 6, 9), electric guitar (6, 8)
- Brandon Hood – electric guitar (2)
- Danny Rader – electric guitar, keyboards (3, 5, 9); background vocals, banjo, programming (3); acoustic guitar (5, 9); bass, drums, percussion (5); bouzouki (9)
- Shani Gandhi – background vocals (3)
- Brandon Towles – programming (3)
- Jerry Roe – drums, percussion (4, 7, 8)
- Rob McNelley – electric guitar (4, 7, 8)
- Dan Dugmore – pedal steel guitar (4, 7), steel guitar (8)
- Charlie Worsham – acoustic guitar (4, 7)
- Graham Barham – background vocals (7)
- John Anderson – lead vocals (7)
- Riley Green – lead vocals (7)
- Ben Helson – acoustic guitar (8)
- Mike Johnson – pedal steel guitar (9, 10)
- Miranda Lambert – lead vocals (9)

=== Technical ===
- Ross Copperman – production (all tracks), additional engineering (1–5, 7–11)
- Jon Randall – production
- Pete Lyman – mastering
- F. Reid Shippen – mixing (all tracks), engineering (1–3, 5, 6, 9–11)
- Shani Gandhi – engineering (2, 6, 9), digital editing (1–5, 7–11), engineering assistance (3)
- Buckley Miller – engineering (4, 7, 8)
- Justin Cortelyou – digital editing (1–5, 7–11)
- Casey Wood – digital editing (2, 3)
- Danny Rader – additional engineering (2, 3, 5)
- Zach Abend – additional engineering (7)
- Brent Rader – additional engineering (9, 10)
- Daniel Bacigalupi – mastering assistance
- Brandon Towles – mixing assistance
- Austin Brown – engineering assistance (1, 10, 11)
- Katelyn Prieboy – engineering assistance (2, 3, 6, 9)
- Chris Vano – engineering assistance (4, 7, 8)
- Mary Hilliard Harrington – executive production
- Alena Moran – production coordination

== Charts ==
Chart performance for Broken Branches
Chart (2025)	Peak position
US Top Country Albums (Billboard)	41
