= Hot Country Knights =

American country music and parody music band

- Origin: Nashville, Tennessee, U.S.
- Genres: Country, Parody, Comedy
- Years active: 2015—present
- Label: Capitol Nashville
- Members: Douglas "Doug" Douglason; Trevor Travis; Marty Ray "Rayro" Roburn; Terotej "Terry" Dvoraczekynski; Barry Van Ricky; Monte Montgomery

Hot Country Knights is an American country music and parody music band formed by country music singer Dierks Bentley in 2015. The band is composed of Bentley and his own road band. Bentley portrays lead singer Douglas "Doug" Douglason, with the other members of his band performing under the names of Trevor Travis (bass guitar), Marty Ray "Rayro" Roburn (lead guitar), Terotej "Terry" Dvoraczekynski (fiddle), Barry Van Ricky (steel guitar), and Monte Montgomery (drums). The members of Bentley's road band have also fashioned fictitious backstories for their musical stage names. In 2020, Capitol Records Nashville, the label to which Bentley is signed, also signed Hot Country Knights. The band is intended to be a satirical tribute to country music of the 1990s. Variety described the band as "a full Spinal Tap-like musical-comedy act around the mullet-laden, '90s-spoofing conceit."

The band released its debut single, "Pick Her Up", a duet with Travis Tritt, in January 2020. It was accompanied by a music video starring Tiffani Thiessen. Hot Country Knights performed "Asphalt" on Jimmy Kimmel Live on February 5, 2020.

In February 2020, Bentley announced in-character as Douglason that Hot Country Knights would begin touring starting in April 2020, which would later be postponed due to the COVID-19 pandemic. The band also released a second music video for "Asphalt" at this point. Capitol Records announced that the group's debut album, The K Is Silent, will be released on May 1, 2020. Bentley co-wrote five songs on the album, with other collaborators including Brett Beavers, Jim Beavers, and Jon Nite. Terri Clark sings duet vocals on the track "You Make It Hard".

== Discography ==
=== Albums ===
Title	Album details
The K Is Silent	Release date: May 1, 2020; Label: Capitol Records Nashville; Format: CD, music download

=== Singles ===
Year	Single	Peak chart positions		Album
Year	Single	US Country Airplay	CAN Country	Album
2020	"Pick Her Up" (featuring Travis Tritt)	41	42	The K Is Silent
2020	"Asphalt"	—	—	The K Is Silent
2020	"Moose Knuckle Shuffle"	—	—	The K Is Silent
2020	"The USA Begins With US"	—	—	The K Is Silent
2020	"You Make It Hard" (featuring Terri Clark)	—	—	The K Is Silent
2023	"Herassmeant" (featuring Darla McFarland)	—	—	
2023	"Midnight Rodeo"	—	—	
2026	"Mrs Claus"	—	—	
