= Dierks Bentley (album) =

Studio album by Dierks Bentley
- Released: August 19, 2003
- Genre: Country
- Length: 46:19
- Label: Capitol Records Nashville
- Producer: Brett Beavers

Dierks Bentley chronology
Don't Leave Me in Love (2001)	Dierks Bentley (2003)	Modern Day Drifter (2005)

Singles from Dierks Bentley
- 1. "What Was I Thinkin'" Released: April 14, 2003; 2. "My Last Name" Released: October 20, 2003; 3. "How Am I Doin'" Released: May 10, 2004

Professional ratings
Review scores
Source	Rating
Allmusic	3.5/5 stars

Dierks Bentley is the debut studio album by American country music artist of the same name. It was released on August 19, 2003 by Capitol Records Nashville. It produced three singles with "What Was I Thinkin'", "My Last Name", and "How Am I Doin'". The first one became Bentley's first number one hit on the US Billboard Hot Country Songs chart. The album sold 1.1 million copies in the US.

The track "My Love Will Follow You" was originally recorded by Buddy Miller on his 1995 album Your Love and Other Lies. "Bartenders, Etc." and "Whiskey Tears" were originally featured on Bentley's independently released 2001 album Don't Leave Me in Love, and were re-recorded for this album.

== Track listing ==
No.	Title	Writer(s)	Length
1.	"What Was I Thinkin'"	Dierks Bentley; Deric Ruttan; Brett Beavers	4:21
2.	"Wish It Would Break"	Bentley; Beavers	3:36
3.	"Forget About You"	Bentley; Ronnie Rogers	3:03
4.	"I Can Only Think of One"	Bentley; Beavers; Steve Bogard	3:50
5.	"My Last Name"	Bentley; Harley Allen	3:30
6.	"Bartenders, Etc..."	Bentley	2:47
7.	"Is Anybody Loving You These Days"	Bentley; Beavers; Bogard	3:23
8.	"My Love Will Follow You"	Buddy Miller; Julie Miller	3:19
9.	"How Am I Doin'"	Bentley; Writer X	3:48
10.	"Distant Shore"	Bentley; Beavers; Ruttan	3:01
11.	"I Bought the Shoes"	Jimmy Melton; Dale Dodson; Ken Mellons	3:27
12.	"Whiskey Tears"	Bentley; Mike Ward	3:32
13.	"Train Travelin'" (featuring the Del McCoury Band)	Bentley	4:40

== Chart performance ==
=== Weekly charts ===
Chart (2003)	Peak position
US Billboard 200	26
US Top Country Albums (Billboard)	4

=== Year-end charts ===
Chart (2003)	Position
US Top Country Albums (Billboard)	47
Chart (2004)	Position
US Billboard 200	149
US Top Country Albums (Billboard)	26
Chart (2005)	Position
US Top Country Albums (Billboard)	49

=== Singles ===
Year	Single	Peak positions	
Year	Single	US Country	US
2003	"What Was I Thinkin'"	1	22
2003	"My Last Name"	17	102
2004	"How Am I Doin'"	4	49

== Certifications ==
Region	Certification
United States (RIAA)	Platinum

== Personnel ==
- Dierks Bentley – lead vocals
- Steve Brewster – drums
- Jimmy Carter – bass guitar
- Shad Cobb – fiddle
- J. T. Corenflos – electric guitar
- Rusty Danmyer – steel guitar
- Glen Duncan – fiddle
- Terry Eldredge – background vocals
- Lona Heins – background vocals
- Wes Hightower – background vocals
- Mike Johnson – steel guitar, Dobro
- Randy Kohrs – Dobro
- James Mitchell – electric guitar
- Russ Pahl – steel guitar, banjo
- Steven Sheehan – acoustic guitar
- Bryan Sutton – acoustic guitar, banjo, mandolin
- Russell Terrell – background vocals

=== The Del McCoury Band (Track 13) ===
- Mike Bub – upright bass
- Jason Carter – fiddle
- Del McCoury – acoustic guitar, background vocals
- Rob McCoury – banjo
- Ronnie McCoury – mandolin, background vocals
