= I Wanna Make You Close Your Eyes =

Single by Dierks Bentley

from the album Feel That Fire
- Released: July 27, 2009
- Recorded: 2009
- Genre: Country
- Length: 3:59
- Label: Capitol Nashville
- Songwriters: Brett Beavers; Dierks Bentley
- Producers: Brett Beavers; Dierks Bentley

Dierks Bentley singles chronology
"Sideways" (2009)	"I Wanna Make You Close Your Eyes" (2009)	"Up on the Ridge" (2010)

"I Wanna Make You Close Your Eyes" is a song co-written and recorded by American country music artist Dierks Bentley. It was released in July 2009 as the third and final single from his 2009 album Feel That Fire. Bentley wrote the song with Brett Beavers.

== Content ==
This song is a country ballad, in which the song's male narrator tells his lover that he "want[s] to make [her] close [her] eyes" (i.e., he wants to feel sexual arousal to the point that she closes her eyes to savor it).

Bentley said of the song, "One of the best compliments I can get is when a guy comes up to me and says that one of my songs helped him out at home...maybe helped him smooth something over with his girlfriend or wife. That's the goal with this one."

== Critical reception ==
Andrew Lacy of Engine 145 gave the song a "thumbs down" rating, criticizing it for "being boring and forgettable." He also went on to say that “[h]ere, [Bentley] sound[ed] as though co-producer Brett Beavers pulled him out of bed early in the morning, put a microphone in front of him, and told him to make it quick because Luke Bryan need[ed] to use the studio in 20 minutes."

== Music video ==
The music video was directed by Chris Hicky and premiered in late 2009.

== Chart performance ==
"I Wanna Make You Close Your Eyes" debuted at number 91 on the Billboard Hot 100 and peaked at number 52. On the week of January 26, 2010, it peaked at number 2 on the country chart, making it the first single from this album to miss the top spot.

Chart (2009–2010)	Peak position
Canada Hot 100 (Billboard)	92
Canada Country (Billboard)	12
US Billboard Hot 100	52
US Hot Country Songs (Billboard)	2

=== Year-end charts ===
Chart (2010)	Position
US Country Songs (Billboard)	44

== Certifications ==
Region	Certification	Certified units/sales
United States (RIAA)	Gold	500,000^{‡}
^{‡} Sales+streaming figures based on certification alone.
