= Sunshine (Deric Ruttan album) =

Studio album by Deric Ruttan
- Released: January 12, 2010
- Genre: Country
- Length: 43:27
- Label: Black T Records
- Producer: Deric Ruttan

Deric Ruttan chronology
First Time in a Long Time (2008)	Sunshine (2010)	Up All Night – Deric Ruttan Live (2011)

Singles from Sunshine
- 1. "Sing That Song Again" Released: September 8, 2009; 2. "Up All Night" Released: February 8, 2010; 3. "That's How I Wanna Go Out" Released: August 23, 2010; 4. "Sunshine (Hey Little Girl)" Released: March 7, 2011

Professional ratings
Review scores
Source	Rating
Country Weekly	3/5 stars

Sunshine is the third studio album by Canadian country music artist Deric Ruttan. The album was released on January 12, 2010, on Black T Records. Its first single was "Sing That Song Again".

== Track listing ==
No.	Title	Writer(s)	Length
1.	"Sing That Song Again"	Ben Hayslip, Deric Ruttan	3:59
2.	"Sunshine (Hey Little Girl)"	Jim Beavers, Ruttan	3:35
3.	"That's How I Wanna Go Out"	Lee Thomas Miller, Ruttan	3:52
4.	"Up All Night"	Jimmy Rankin, Ruttan	3:36
5.	"I Still Think of You"		3:05
6.	"Where the Train Don't Stop"		3:35
7.	"One in a Million"		4:05
8.	"We're All Alright"		3:52
9.	"The River Taught Her How to Run"		3:27
10.	"That Guy"		3:27
11.	"Just to Get to You"		4:30
Total length:			43:27

== Chart performance ==
=== Singles ===
Year	Single	Peak positions
Year	Single	CAN
2009	"Sing That Song Again"	—
2010	"Up All Night"	91
2010	"That's How I Wanna Go Out"	87
2011	"Sunshine (Hey Little Girl)"	—
"—" denotes releases that did not chart
