= Take the Week Off (song) =

Single by Deric Ruttan

from the album Take the Week Off
- Released: August 2013
- Genre: Country
- Length: 2:59
- Label: Black T/Universal
- Songwriter(s): Deric Ruttan; Ryan Tyndell
- Producer(s): Deric Ruttan; Luke Wooten

Deric Ruttan singles chronology
"Where the Train Don't Stop" (2013)	"Take the Week Off" (2013)	"Pass It Around" (2014)

"Take the Week Off" is a song recorded by Canadian country music artist Deric Ruttan. It was released in August 2013 as the first single from his fourth studio album, Take the Week Off. It peaked at number 66 on the Canadian Hot 100 in October 2013.

== Music video ==
The music video premiered in August 2013. It was directed by Margaret Malandruccolo and filmed in Rome, Italy.

== Chart performance ==
"Take the Week Off" debuted at number 66 on the Canadian Hot 100 for the week of October 5, 2013.

Chart (2013)	Peak position
Canada (Canadian Hot 100)	66
Canada Country (Billboard)	10
