= Sideways (Dierks Bentley song) =

Single by Dierks Bentley

from the album Feel That Fire
- Released: March 2, 2009
- Recorded: 2008–09
- Genre: Country
- Length: 3:04
- Label: Capitol Nashville
- Songwriters: Jim Beavers; Dierks Bentley
- Producers: Brett Beavers; Dierks Bentley

Dierks Bentley singles chronology
"Feel That Fire" (2008)	"Sideways" (2009)	"I Wanna Make You Close Your Eyes" (2009)

"Sideways" is a song co-written and recorded by American country music artist Dierks Bentley. It was released on March 2, 2009, as the second single from his 2009 album Feel That Fire and as the twelfth single of his career. On the chart week of July 11, 2009, the song became Bentley's seventh Number One hit on the U.S. Billboard Hot Country Songs chart.

== Content ==
"Sideways" was co-written by Bentley himself, along with Jim Beavers, the brother of Bentley's producer, Brett Beavers. This song is a up-tempo backed mainly by electric guitar and by banjo. The song is about the male character's attempt to talk to a female in a bar. Despite not being able to hear her name because of the loud noise, he still tries to come on to her, saying that he wants to "get a little sideways" with her. The song's final chorus features the ambient noise of a bar, along with a chanted chorus by backing vocalists.

== Music video ==
The music video was directed by Michael Salomon, and features Bentley singing in front of a large party crowd. The video was #50 on the GAC's Top 50 Videos of the Year list. It was shot inside the Fuse nightclub, located inside the Gaylord Opryland Resort & Convention Center.

A second video, containing live performance footage, was released in August 2009. This is the most commonly used version on TV.

== Critical reception ==
Kevin J. Coyne of Country Universe gave the song a C rating and thought that Bentley sounded uncomfortable singing the song, making it sound "dull and lifeless" as a result.

== Other versions ==
The song was used and mixed by the dance crew Southern Movement, hailing from Nashville, Tennessee, during the first week and premiere of the fourth season of America's Best Dance Crew.

"Sideways", with rewritten NASCAR-centric lyrics, was the theme song for NASCAR on Fox during the 2011 and 2012 NASCAR Sprint Cup Series seasons. Bentley, a racing fan, called the opportunity a "pretty cool thing".

== Chart performance ==
Chart (2009)	Peak position
Canada Hot 100 (Billboard)	63
Canada Country (Billboard)	4
US Billboard Hot 100	35
US Hot Country Songs (Billboard)	1

=== Year-end charts ===
Chart (2009)	Position
US Country Songs (Billboard)	6

=== Certifications ===
Region	Certification	Certified units/sales
United States (RIAA)	Platinum	1,000,000^{‡}
^{‡} Sales+streaming figures based on certification alone.
