= Feel That Fire (song) =

Single by Dierks Bentley

from the album Feel That Fire
- Released: September 29, 2008
- Recorded: 2008
- Genre: Country
- Length: 3:21
- Label: Capitol Nashville
- Songwriters: Brett Beavers; Dierks Bentley; Brad Warren; Brett Warren
- Producers: Brett Beavers; Dierks Bentley

Dierks Bentley singles chronology
"Trying to Stop Your Leaving" (2008)	"Feel That Fire" (2008)	"Sideways" (2009)

"Feel That Fire" is a song co-written and recorded by American country music artist Dierks Bentley. It was released in September 2008 as the first single and title track from his 2009 album of the same name. The song became Bentley's sixth Number One on the U.S. Billboard Hot Country Songs chart for the week of February 21, 2009.

== Content ==
This song, which Bentley co-wrote along with Brad and Brett Warren (of The Warren Brothers) and his producer Brett Beavers, is an up-tempo mostly accompanied by electric guitar and banjo. It describes the narrator's lover and lists off all the things that she wants, such as "rid[ing] the bull at the rodeo" and “mak[ing] every stray [animal] a pet". In the chorus, the narrator explains that "she needs to feel that fire" and be his lover. This song is set in the key of A♭ major with the guitars set to E♭ tuning and a main chord pattern of A♭-G♭-D♭-A♭. Bentley's vocals range from G♭_{2} to E♭_{4}.

== Critical reception ==
Alison Bonaguro, in an entry for the CMT blog, described the song favorably. In her review, she said, "In a world of passionless relationships, I think this song is very aspirational."

The song received a "thumbs down" review from the country music site Engine 145. Despite calling it an "uptempo number that finds Bentley singing about something other than life on the road, featuring a rockin’ intro", critic Brady Vercher said that the song "contains a weak narrative that settles for what's easiest by barely delving into the subject."

== Promotion ==
To promote the single, Bentley shipped more than 2000 boxes of Cracker Jack to various radio stations (a reference to "she wants the toy in the Cracker Jack", a line from the opening). Fifty-one stations were chosen randomly as winners, with the grand prize being a concert with Bentley.

The music video featured actress and model Sarah Desage.

== Chart performance ==
Chart (2008–2009)	Peak position
Canada Hot 100 (Billboard)	54
Canada Country (Billboard)	2
US Billboard Hot 100	32
US Hot Country Songs (Billboard)	1

=== Year-end charts ===
Chart (2009)	Position
US Country Songs (Billboard)	31

== Certifications ==
Region	Certification	Certified units/sales
United States (RIAA)	Platinum	1,000,000^{‡}
^{‡} Sales+streaming figures based on certification alone.
