= How Am I Doin' =

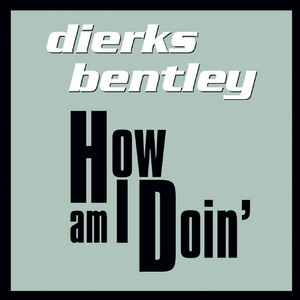

Single by Dierks Bentley

from the album Dierks Bentley
- Released: May 10, 2004
- Recorded: 2003
- Genre: Country
- Length: 3:48
- Label: Capitol Nashville
- Songwriters: Jim Beavers; Dierks Bentley
- Producer: Brett Beavers

Dierks Bentley singles chronology
| "My Last Name" (2003) | "How Am I Doin'" (2004) | "Lot of Leavin' Left to Do" (2005) |

"How Am I Doin'" is a song co-written and recorded by American country music artist Dierks Bentley. It was released in May 2004 as the third and final single from his 2003 self-titled debut album. The song became his second Top 5 hit on the U.S. Billboard Hot Country Songs chart that year, reaching a peak of No. 4. It also reached No. 49 on the U.S. Billboard Hot 100. Bentley wrote this song with Writer X, a pseudonym of Jim Beavers.

== Content ==
The song is an uptempo in which the narrator has just received a phone call from his ex-girlfriend. She asks him how he has been since she broke up with him and he responds by explaining why his life is better without her.

== Music video ==
The music video was the third directed by Peter Zavadil, and the video co-stars Lauren Elaine reprising her role as "Becky" from "What Was I Thinkin'".

The video starts out with the narrator stuck on the side of a road with the interstate highway in the background. The motorcycle he was riding has apparently broken down or run out of gas. The phone in the nearby phone booth can be faintly heard ringing. The narrator answers it and finds it's his ex-girlfriend calling. After being cordial at first, he hurriedly gets her off the phone because he really doesn't want to talk to her. It seems she says she loves him, to which he responds, "Whatever".

As the main beat of the song begins, he takes a picture of her, looks at it for a moment while rubbing his eye (matched up with the lyric "I sometimes cry"), then throws it away on the side of the road. He examines the bike and then tosses the wallet he's carrying away as well.

A group of girls in an off-road vehicle happen along and start chatting with the narrator. He eventually leaves with them (leaving the motorcycle where it is) and is taken into Las Vegas. They all get out in front of a casino (which appears to be the Binion's – the Horseshoe Casino – as it's the only Las Vegas casino with shoe in the name, which is visible). The girls then get back into their vehicle and leave the narrator at the casino.

Inside the casino, he ends up on stage and positioned to play karaoke. After microphone problems, he is asked by the mobster group nearby if he feels lucky and if he has any money. They let him play for "three bucks" and he ends up winning. He is roughed from the table, into a car, and taken to a remote location, where the apparent mob leader tells him he loves him. He later appears with the mob in a suit and rolling the dice at a craps table. As the mob begins to argue with one another, he takes his leave.

In a hotel room (room 34), there is a knock on the door. The narrator opens it and sees his ex-girlfriend (Lauren Elaine), who walks into the room and starts talking to him. He is heard saying "Not the tank top" and gesturing that he wants something, supposedly the tank top, back, suggesting that it's his. She responds by taking her top off leaving only her bra in place. He leaves her in the room and is seen leaving the hotel. (No), he doesn't want to be tempted by seeing her in just her bra, so he's telling her not to take off the tanktop.

For the final stanza, different shots with both of his new groups of friends are used, and the narrator is eventually seen along another road. A limousine pulls up. As he gets in, the plate is revealed to read "JAKE". The limousine leaves as the narrator confesses he doesn't really have a destination in mind.

The license plate is a reference to 'Jake,' as in Dierks' dog.

== Chart positions ==
"How Am I Doin'" debuted at number 59 on the U.S. Billboard Hot Country Singles & Tracks for the week of May 15, 2004.

| Chart (2004) | Peak position |
|---|---|
| Canada Country (Radio & Records) | 20 |
| US Billboard Hot 100 | 49 |
| US Hot Country Songs (Billboard) | 4 |

=== Year-end charts ===
| Chart (2004) | Position |
|---|---|
| US Country Songs (Billboard) | 47 |
