= Up on the Ridge (song) =

Single by Dierks Bentley

from the album Up on the Ridge
- Released: April 12, 2010
- Recorded: 2010
- Genre: Country; bluegrass
- Length: 3:34
- Label: Capitol Nashville
- Songwriters: Dierks Bentley; Angelo Petraglia
- Producer: Jon Randall

Dierks Bentley singles chronology
"I Wanna Make You Close Your Eyes" (2009)	"Up on the Ridge" (2010)	"Draw Me a Map" (2010)

"Up on the Ridge" is a song co-written and recorded by American country music artist Dierks Bentley. It was released on April 12, 2010 as the lead-off single and title track from his album of the same name. The song peaked at number 21 on the US Billboard Hot Country Songs chart. Bentley wrote this song with Angelo Petraglia.

== Content ==
The song is an uptempo bluegrass tune in which the narrator encourages his lover to leave the city behind with him for the night.

== Critical reception ==
Sam Gazdziak of Engine 145 gave the song a "thumbs up" review, saying the song "coasts by on style over substance," but calling it "interesting." Country Weekly critic Jessica Phillips, in her review of the album, said that "the song's energetic spirit and banjo-supported melody should be a shot in the arm for country music."

== Chart performance ==
The song debuted on the U.S. Billboard Hot Country Songs charts at #59 during the week of May 1, 2010. On the Hot Country Songs charts, the song peaked at #21, becoming his first single to miss the Top Ten since "My Last Name" reached #17 in 2004.

Chart (2010)	Peak position
Canada Country (Billboard)	34
US Billboard Hot 100	99
US Hot Country Songs (Billboard)	21
