= Free and Easy (Down the Road I Go) =

Single by Dierks Bentley

from the album Long Trip Alone
- Released: June 4, 2007
- Recorded: 2006
- Genre: Country rock
- Length: 3:19
- Label: Capitol Nashville
- Songwriters: Brett Beavers; Rob Harrington; Dierks Bentley; Rod Janzen
- Producer: Brett Beavers

Dierks Bentley singles chronology
"Long Trip Alone" (2006)	"Free and Easy (Down the Road I Go)" (2007)	"Trying to Stop Your Leaving" (2008)

"Free and Easy (Down the Road I Go)" is a song co-written and recorded by American country music artist Dierks Bentley. It was released in June 2007 as the third single from his 2006 album Long Trip Alone. It became his fifth Number One single on the U.S. Billboard Hot Country Songs charts. The song was made available as downloadable content for the game Rock Band on December 16, 2008. The song was written by Bentley, Brett Beavers, Rob Harrington and Rod Janzen.

== Critical reception ==
Kevin John Coyne of Country Universe gave the song a B+ grade, saying that it was "an uptempo, breezy romp with plenty of banjo and carefree charm."

== Chart performance ==
Chart (2007)	Peak position
Canada Hot 100 (Billboard)	59
Canada Country (Billboard)	2
US Billboard Hot 100	46
US Hot Country Songs (Billboard)	1

=== Year-end charts ===
Chart (2007)	Position
US Country Songs (Billboard)	9

== Certifications ==
Region	Certification	Certified units/sales
United States (RIAA)	Platinum	1,000,000^{‡}
^{‡} Sales+streaming figures based on certification alone.
