= She Hates Me (Dierks Bentley song) =

2025 song by Dierks Bentley

Single by Dierks Bentley

from the album Broken Branches
- Released: February 14, 2025
- Recorded: 2024
- Genre: Country
- Length: 2:50
- Label: Capitol Nashville
- Songwriters: Dierks Bentley; Ashley Gorley; Ross Copperman; Wes Scantlin; Jimmy Allen
- Producers: Jon Randall; Ross Copperman

Dierks Bentley singles chronology
"American Girl" (2023)	"She Hates Me" (2025)	"Hurtin' Songs" (2025)

Music video
- "She Hates Me" on YouTube

"She Hates Me" is a song by American country music singer Dierks Bentley. It was released on February 14, 2025, as the lead single to Bentley's eleventh studio album, Broken Branches. Bentley wrote the song with Ashley Gorley and Ross Copperman; due to thematic similarities to Puddle of Mudd's 2002 single of the same name, group members Wes Scantlin and Jimmy Allen are also credited as co-writers. Lyrically, the song is about a woman who is not interested in the narrator. The song's music video features Bentley unsuccessfully trying to escape from his girlfriend. "She Hates Me" received mixed critical reception for the song's tone and lyrical content.

== History ==
Bentley wrote the song with songwriters Ashley Gorley and Ross Copperman at a songwriters' camp. According to iHeartMedia, the idea came about when the songwriters were "goofing around" prior to writing a more "serious" song. He also stated that the song "came to life in the studio", and that he "started taking it more seriously" due to positive reception from friends and family. He previewed the song on social media in December 2024, followed by the release of a music video. The music video portrays Bentley trying in vain to escape from his girlfriend. The song serves as the lead single to Bentley's 2025 album Broken Branches. He released the song and music video on February 14, 2025.

== Content and reception ==
Lyrically, "She Hates Me" is about the narrator's feelings toward a woman who, despite her positive attributes, "hates" him for undisclosed reasons. Alli Patton of Holler Country stated of the song's content that "he's left with all of these feelings and his sights set on a woman who couldn't care less. In the song, he promises that he's a likable guy, but still, she's just not interested." Because of its lyrical and thematic resemblance to rock band Puddle of Mudd's 2002 song of the same name, that band's members Wes Scantlin and Jimmy Allen are also credited as co-writers.

Country Now writer Madeleine O'Connell compared the song thematically to Bentley's 2014 single "Drunk on a Plane", and also stated that Bentley "portrays it in a lighthearted manner with the accompaniment of hard-hitting electric guitar plucks and head-banging beats, creating an overall grungy vibe." The single was less favorably received by Country Universe writers Kevin John Coyne and Jonathan Keefe, who respectively graded it "D" and "F". Coyne observed that "Drunk on a Plane" also shared lyrical similarities to the Puddle of Mudd song, and concluded that Bentley was "slumming" as a result. Keefe considered the original Puddle of Mudd song "god-awful" and also stated that the song was "all the more disappointing that he’s grasping for a radio hit by singing about a woman as a list of personality markers instead of a believable human and then acting like it’s her fault that she doesn’t find him charming."

== Charts ==
Weekly chart performance for "She Hates Me"
Chart (2025)	Peak position
Canada Country (Billboard)	24
US Hot Country Songs (Billboard)	46
US Country Airplay (Billboard)	23
