= Gold (Dierks Bentley song) =

Single by Dierks Bentley

from the album Gravel & Gold
- Released: August 8, 2022
- Genre: Country
- Length: 2:51
- Label: Capitol Nashville
- Songwriters: Dierks Bentley; Ashley Gorley; Ross Copperman; Luke Dick
- Producers: Dierks Bentley; Ross Copperman; Jon Randall; F. Reid Shippen

Dierks Bentley singles chronology
"Worth a Shot" (2022)	"Gold" (2022)	"Something Real" (2023)

"Gold" is a song by American country music singer Dierks Bentley. It was released on August 8, 2022, as the first single and partial title track to Bentley's tenth studio album Gravel & Gold.

== History ==
Tom Roland of Billboard wrote that the song is "a return to an increasingly familiar theme in his work: the importance of living in the moment, rather than worrying about the future or fretting about the past." Bentley wrote the song during a songwriting session with Ashley Gorley, Ross Copperman, and Luke Dick. Dick presented the other writers with a "two-chord guitar pattern". Taking inspiration from his own pickup truck, Bentley came up with the song's central idea of contrasting gravel and gold. Bentley and Copperman produced the final recording of the song with assistance from Jon Randall and F. Reid Shippen. Contributing musicians on the track include Bryan Sutton, Sam Bush, and Charlie Worsham.

== Music video ==
Bentley released a video for the song on October 31, 2022.

== Chart performance ==
=== Weekly charts ===
Weekly chart performance
Chart (2022–2023)	Peak position
Canada Hot 100 (Billboard)	63
Canada Country (Billboard)	1
US Billboard Hot 100	68
US Country Airplay (Billboard)	2
US Hot Country Songs (Billboard)	20

=== Year-end charts ===
Year-end chart performance
Chart (2023)	Position
US Country Airplay (Billboard)	12
US Hot Country Songs (Billboard)	51
US Radio Songs (Billboard)	59

== Certifications ==
Certifications for "Gold"
Region	Certification	Certified units/sales
Canada (Music Canada)	Gold	40,000^{‡}
United States (RIAA)	Gold	500,000^{‡}
^{‡} Sales+streaming figures based on certification alone.
