= Draw Me a Map =

Single by Dierks Bentley

from the album Up on the Ridge
- Released: August 23, 2010
- Recorded: 2010
- Genre: Country; bluegrass
- Length: 3:31
- Label: Capitol Nashville
- Songwriters: Dierks Bentley; Jon Randall
- Producer: Jon Randall

Dierks Bentley singles chronology
"Up on the Ridge" (2010)	"Draw Me a Map" (2010)	"Am I the Only One" (2011)

"Draw Me a Map" is a song co-written and recorded by American country music artist Dierks Bentley. It was released in August 2010 as the fifteenth single release of his career and the second and final single from his 2010 bluegrass album Up on the Ridge. The song was written by Bentley and Jon Randall.

== Critical reception ==
Blake Boldt of Engine 145 gave the song a "thumbs up", calling it "a plaintive ballad that easily fits among the best singles of the year." He praised the "rich images" of the lyrics and the backing vocals from Alison Krauss. Bobby Peacock of Roughstock gave it a full five-star rating, calling the single "a near-flawless exercise in simplicity."

== Music video ==
The music video was directed by Roger Pistole and premiered in late 2010.

== Chart performance ==
With a peak of number 33 on Hot Country Songs, "Draw Me a Map" was the lowest-peaking single of Bentley's career, until "What the Hell Did I Say" failed to break the Top 40 in 2017.

Chart (2010)	Peak position
Canada Country (Billboard)	50
US Hot Country Songs (Billboard)	33
US Billboard Bubbling Under Hot 100	8
