= Settle for a Slowdown =

Single by Dierks Bentley

from the album Modern Day Drifter
- B-side: "I Love My Life" (Jamie O'Neal)
- Released: January 24, 2006
- Recorded: 2005
- Genre: Country
- Length: 3:43
- Label: Capitol Nashville
- Songwriters: Brett Beavers; Tony Martin; Dierks Bentley
- Producers: Brett Beavers; Dierks Bentley

Dierks Bentley singles chronology
"Come a Little Closer" (2005)	"Settle for a Slowdown" (2006)	"Every Mile a Memory" (2006)

"Settle for a Slowdown" is a song co-written and recorded by American country music artist Dierks Bentley. It was released in January 2006 as the third and final single from his second studio album Modern Day Drifter. The song becoming Bentley's third #1 single on the U.S. Billboard Hot Country Songs chart. The song was written by Bentley, Brett Beavers and Tony Martin.

== Content ==
The song is a mid-tempo ballad that paints a picture of a man watching his loved one pull away. He knows he cannot hold her back, but he just hopes that he will see brake lights, indicating that she at least paused for a moment before leaving him behind. Just knowing that she hesitated would be a measure of comfort, but it doesn't happen.

In the first verse, he is looking for a "slowdown" from his lover's vehicle while "getting soaked to the bone" (i.e., standing out in the rain). All he wants is to see the brake lights flash, just once, to know that she once loved him enough for the slightest hesitation, but she never does.

== Critical reception ==
Deborah Evans Price, of Billboard magazine reviewed the song favorably, saying that the song serves up the theme "with a creative lyric that finds a fresh way of saying what we have all heard before." She goes on to say that Bentley "turns in a beautifully measured, thoughtful performance that oozes hurt tempered with reluctant resignation."

== Music video ==
The music video was directed by Chris Hicky and premiered on March 16, 2006. The music video paints a picture of a woman leaving Bentley and their trailer in the desert for Hollywood. Bentley eventually shows up in Hollywood at a mansion and sings the chorus acoustically.

== Chart positions ==
"Settle for a Slowdown" debuted at number 47 on the U.S. Billboard Hot Country Songs for the week of January 28, 2006.

Chart (2006)	Peak position
Canada Country (Radio & Records)	3
US Billboard Hot 100	42
US Hot Country Songs (Billboard)	1

=== Year-end charts ===
Chart (2006)	Position
US Country Songs (Billboard)	19

== Certifications ==
Region	Certification	Certified units/sales
United States (RIAA)	Gold	500,000^{‡}
^{‡} Sales+streaming figures based on certification alone.
