= What Was I Thinkin' =

Single by Dierks Bentley

from the album Dierks Bentley
- B-side: "Whiskey Tears"
- Released: April 14, 2003
- Recorded: 2003
- Genre: Country
- Length: 4:21
- Label: Capitol Nashville
- Songwriters: Deric Ruttan; Brett Beavers; Dierks Bentley
- Producer: Brett Beavers

Dierks Bentley singles chronology
"Don't Leave Me In Love" (2001)	"What Was I Thinkin'" (2003)	"My Last Name" (2003)

"What Was I Thinkin'" is the debut single by American country music artist Dierks Bentley, released in April 2003 from his self-titled debut album. The song became his first number one hit on the U.S. Billboard Hot Country Songs chart in September 2003.

== Content ==
Bentley co-wrote "What Was I Thinkin'" with his record producer, Brett Beavers, and Deric Ruttan. In the song, he recalls escaping one night with a "beauty from south Alabama" named Becky while the narrator spends the song constantly questioning "what was I thinkin'", being mesmerized by Becky into committing all manner of foolish activities. The night begins with Becky and the narrator, sneaking out of her father's house, but her father catches them leaving the property and shoots the tailgate of the truck on their way out with his shotgun. Shortly after, they are caught in a police chase where the narrator drives his truck through a cornfield to escape, much to Becky's delight. Later into the night, he encounters a large man with a "born to kill" tattoo whom he starts a fight with after the man tries to get between him and Becky, and has to frantically run away from him once he "[knocks] out his front tooth." He returns Becky to her home late at night, but her father is already waiting "in a lawn chair" in the driveway for the pair. The narrator shuts off his truck and waits as the father advances towards them. Yet Becky, being the rowdy girl she is, grins and then sends them speeding off into the night once again.

The song is composed in the key of F minor with a "moderately fast" tempo. Its main chord pattern is F_{5}-D♭-E♭-B♭.

Bentley stated that he was inspired by an incident that had occurred while he was working as a behind-the-scenes staffer at The Nashville Network in the late 1990s. Bentley had regularly been trespassing in the Grand Ole Opry House using his TNN credentials to congregate with the country stars of the era; the central story behind "What Was I Thinkin'" was based upon a similar adventure Bentley had undertaken with a girl he had met while working with TNN. Pete Fisher, the manager of the Grand Ole Opry, was angered by Bentley's trespassing and banned Bentley from the program before he had ever become famous, only lifting the ban after "What Was I Thinkin'" became a hit. Bentley would eventually be inducted as an Opry member in 2005.

== Critical reception ==
Rick Cohoon of AllMusic gave the single a mixed review, comparing its sound and theme to David Lee Murphy's "Dust on the Bottle" and calling the song "catchy enough, yet overdone." Deborah Evans Price of Billboard wrote that the song had an "infectious" melody and "lots of energy."

Because of the line "I was thinkin' 'bout a little white tank top / Sittin' right there in the middle by me," Bentley told Billboard magazine that he began seeing female fans wearing white tank-tops to concerts.

In 2017, Billboard contributor Chuck Dauphin put "What Was I Thinkin'" at number four on his top 10 list of Bentley's best songs.

== Music video ==
The music video was directed by Peter Zavadil and premiered in mid-2003. It tells the story of the song's events in retrospect as the narrator looks over the damage he incurred from his wild night with Becky (such as pulling a corn stalk from the undercarriage of his Ford Ranchero or looking at the scar he picked up from his fight with the "mountain of a man with a 'born to kill' tattoo", which apparently is Becky's ex-boyfriend) while wondering if it was really worth it.

The video features Lauren Elaine as "Becky", the white tank top wearing "beauty from South Alabama". Elaine also appears in "How Am I Doin'", "Lot of Leavin' Left to Do", and "Am I the Only One" as the same character. The video was shot in New Braunfels and Kingsbury, Texas over 3 days in May 2003. The video opens on the night of the date when Bentley takes Becky back home. She asks if he would want to do it again, and he excitedly and quickly agrees. He is seen performing with his band throughout, and sitting on the hood of his truck looking at pictures of the date he can't remember.

== Commercial performance ==
"What Was I Thinkin'" is Bentley's highest charting single on the Billboard Hot 100 as of 2023, peaking at number 22. It reached its peak position of number one on the Billboard Hot Country Songs charts dated for the week ending September 27, 2003. The song succeeded Alan Jackson and Jimmy Buffett's duet "It's Five O'Clock Somewhere" at this peak.

Chart (2003)	Peak position
US Billboard Hot 100	22
US Hot Country Songs (Billboard)	1

=== Year-end charts ===
Chart (2003)	Position
US Billboard Hot 100	87
US Country Songs (Billboard)	6

== Certifications ==
Region	Certification	Certified units/sales
United States (RIAA)	4× Platinum	4,000,000^{‡}
^{‡} Sales+streaming figures based on certification alone.
