= Trying to Stop Your Leaving =

Single by Dierks Bentley

from the album Long Trip Alone
- Released: January 28, 2008
- Recorded: 2006
- Genre: Country
- Length: 3:38
- Label: Capitol Nashville
- Songwriters: Brett Beavers; Jim Beavers; Dierks Bentley
- Producer: Brett Beavers

Dierks Bentley singles chronology
"Free and Easy (Down the Road I Go)" (2007)	"Trying to Stop Your Leaving" (2008)	"Feel That Fire" (2008)

"Trying to Stop Your Leaving" is a song co-written and recorded by American country music artist Dierks Bentley. It was released in January 2008 as the fourth and final single from his 2006 album Long Trip Alone. It peaked at number 5 on the U.S. Billboard Hot Country Songs chart and at number 73 on the U.S. Billboard Hot 100 chart. The song was written by Bentley, Brett Beavers and Jim Beavers.

== Content ==
The narrator is a man who is describing his difficulty in trying to keep his lover from leaving him. He uses various metaphors to illustrate his point. For example, in one verse, he compares the situation to throwing a pebble into the Rio Grande, stating that he could "throw in a million more and not slow it down".

== Critical reception ==
Kevin John Coyne of Country Universe gave the song an A− grade, saying that he liked the "rise and fall in intensity, [and] the delicate intertwining of the electric guitar and the steel." In 2017, Billboard contributor Chuck Dauphin put "Trying to Stop Your Leaving" at number two on his top 10 list of Bentley's best songs.

== Music video ==
The music video was directed by Trey Fanjoy, and features Bentley standing by a river, and him and his band playing in the middle of a railroad track in a tunnel. It also features Bentley and his (only in the video) wife fighting and her packing her bags. It also shows them having sexual activity.

== Chart performance ==
"Trying to Stop Your Leaving" debuted at number 57 on the U.S. Billboard Hot Country Songs chart for the week of January 26, 2008.

Chart (2008)	Peak position
Canada Country (Billboard)	13
US Billboard Hot 100	73
US Hot Country Songs (Billboard)	5

=== Year-end charts ===
Chart (2008)	Position
US Country Songs (Billboard)	36
