= Long Trip Alone (song) =

Single by Dierks Bentley

from the album Long Trip Alone
- Released: November 13, 2006
- Recorded: 2006
- Genre: Country
- Length: 3:43
- Label: Capitol Nashville
- Songwriters: Brett Beavers; Steve Bogard; Dierks Bentley
- Producer: Brett Beavers

Dierks Bentley singles chronology
"Every Mile a Memory" (2006)	"Long Trip Alone" (2006)	"Free and Easy (Down the Road I Go)" (2007)

"Long Trip Alone" is a song co-written and recorded by American country music artist Dierks Bentley. It was released in November 2006 as the second single and title track from his 2006 album of the same name. The song peaked at number 10 on the US Billboard Hot Country Songs chart and at number 66 on the US Billboard Hot 100. Bentley wrote this song with Steve Bogard and Brett Beavers.

== Content ==
The song's narrator is expressing the need to have a traveling companion in the journey of life.

== Music video ==
The music video was directed by Charles Mehling and premiered in late-2006. It features a man who is walking home after doing time in jail. In the video, Bentley had his famous curls shaved off, when his character was sent off to jail. It was filmed over a 3-day period in Mexico City, Mexico.

== Chart performance ==
Chart (2006–2007)	Peak position
Canada Country (Billboard)	10
US Billboard Hot 100	66
US Hot Country Songs (Billboard)	10

=== Year-end charts ===
Chart (2007)	Position
US Country Songs (Billboard)	42
