= Come a Little Closer (Dierks Bentley song) =

Single by Dierks Bentley

from the album Modern Day Drifter
- B-side: "Lot of Leavin' Left to Do"
- Released: July 18, 2005
- Genre: Country
- Length: 4:42 (album version)
- Label: Capitol Nashville
- Songwriters: Brett Beavers; Dierks Bentley
- Producers: Brett Beavers; Dierks Bentley

Dierks Bentley singles chronology
"Lot of Leavin' Left to Do" (2005)	"Come a Little Closer" (2005)	"Settle for a Slowdown" (2006)

"Come a Little Closer" is a song co-written and recorded by American country music artist Dierks Bentley. It was released in July 2005 as the second single from his 2005 album Modern Day Drifter. The song reached number one on the U.S. Hot Country Songs chart and held that position for the weeks of December 3 and December 10, 2005. On the chart for December 17, the song fell to number two when Joe Nichols' "Tequila Makes Her Clothes Fall Off" replaced it at the top spot. The song then returned to number 1 for a third and final week on the chart dated December 24. The song was written by Bentley and Brett Beavers.

== Critical reception ==
Deborah Evans Price, of Billboard magazine reviewed the song favorably, saying that Bentley "shows he has a way with a ballad on this sultry number. The sensual tone and sexy lyric hark back to those envelope-pushing Conway Twitty hits that once raised eyebrows. She goes on to compare the song to Twitty's, "I'd Love to Lay You Down." On Bentley's vocals she says that he "brings warmth to a decidedly sensual lyric." Kevin John Coyne, reviewing the song for Country Universe, gave it a negative rating. He said that Bentley doesn't quite have the vocal maturity to pull this song off but he is getting there.

== Music video ==
The music video was directed by David McClister and premiered in September 8, 2005. It was filmed in Nashville in a warehouse. Dierks Bentley's love interest was played by Bonnie-Jill Laflin.

The music video reached number 1 on CMT's Top Twenty Countdown for the week of November 24, 2005.

== Chart positions ==
"Come a Little Closer" debuted at number 49 on the U.S. Billboard Hot Country Songs for the week of July 30, 2005.

Chart (2005)	Peak position
Canada Country (Radio & Records)	3
US Billboard Hot 100	31
US Hot Country Songs (Billboard)	1

=== Year-end charts ===
Chart (2005)	Position
US Country Songs (Billboard)	53

Chart (2006)	Position
US Country Songs (Billboard)	51

== Certifications ==
Region	Certification	Certified units/sales
United States (RIAA)	Platinum	1,000,000^{‡}
^{‡} Sales+streaming figures based on certification alone.
