= My Last Name =

Single by Dierks Bentley

from the album Dierks Bentley
- Released: October 20, 2003
- Recorded: 2003
- Genre: Country
- Length: 3:30
- Label: Capitol Nashville
- Songwriters: Harley Allen; Dierks Bentley
- Producer: Brett Beavers

Dierks Bentley singles chronology
"What Was I Thinkin'" (2003)	"My Last Name" (2003)	"How Am I Doin'" (2004)

"My Last Name" is a song co-written and recorded by American country music artist Dierks Bentley. It was released in October 2003 as the second single from his self-titled debut album. The song peaked at number 17 on the U.S. Billboard Hot Country Songs chart, becoming Bentley's first single to miss the Top 10 and his only one until 2010's "Up on the Ridge", which peaked at number 21. Bentley wrote this song with Harley Allen.

== Content ==
The narrator describes the origins and the experiences of his last name, such as when he beat up a bully who made fun of his name and when his grandpa "took it off to Europe to fight the Germans in the war". In the final verse, the narrator then says that he wants to marry his lover — to give her his last name because he does not have much.

== Music video ==
The music video was directed by Peter Zavadil, who directed the video for his previous single "What Was I Thinkin'". At the beginning, it shows Dierks Bentley's name spelled wrong on a marquee, but at the end of the video, it has been corrected.

== Critical reception ==
Samantha H., reviewing the song for Country Music Online.net, wrote that the song "My Last Name" "is a great story song. All about getting teased because of his last name and still being proud of it. Then one day he offers it to a woman through marriage." Robert L. Doerschuk of Allmusic, however, called it "gauzy nostalgia."

== Chart performance ==
"My Last Name" debuted at number 55 on the U.S. Billboard Hot Country Singles & Tracks for the week ending October 25, 2003.

Chart (2003–2004)	Peak position
Canada Country (Radio & Records)	28
US Bubbling Under Hot 100 (Billboard)	2
US Hot Country Songs (Billboard)	17

=== Year-end charts ===
Chart (2004)	Position
US Country Songs (Billboard)	56
