= Every Mile a Memory =

Single by Dierks Bentley

from the album Long Trip Alone
- Released: July 17, 2006
- Recorded: 2006
- Genre: Country
- Length: 3:52
- Label: Capitol Nashville
- Songwriters: Brett Beavers; Steve Bogard; Dierks Bentley
- Producer: Brett Beavers

Dierks Bentley singles chronology
"Settle for a Slowdown" (2006)	"Every Mile a Memory" (2006)	"Long Trip Alone" (2006)

"Every Mile a Memory" is a song co-written and recorded by American country music artist Dierks Bentley. It was released in July 2006 as the first single from his 2006 album Long Trip Alone. It became Bentley's fourth number one hit on the US Billboard Hot Country Songs chart in November 2006, the same week that the album was at number one on the Top Country Albums chart. Bentley wrote this song with Steve Bogard and Brett Beavers.

== Content ==
This song tells the story of a man missing a woman and how everything he sees and hears evokes her memory.

== Critical reception ==
Deborah Evans Price of Billboard magazine reviewed the song favorably, calling it a "potent single that continues to demonstrate the irresistible chemistry that occurs when a great singer meets a memorable tune." She went on to mention that Bentley "really knows how to sell a song, and he gets the job done on this well-written track." On the production, she calls it "deft" and states that it "underscores the ache in each word." In 2017, Billboard contributor Chuck Dauphin put "Every Mile a Memory" at number five on his top 10 list of Bentley's best songs.

== Music video ==
The music video was directed by Russell Thomas and premiered on August 3, 2006. It was made to promote his live 2006 TV special, "Live & Loud At The Filmore". Shot in a grainy texture, it features black-and-white footage of Dierks in concert, and yellow footage of him driving a truck and motorcycle down a highway with the sun in his face.

The music video reached number 1 on CMT's Top Twenty Countdown for the week of October 19, 2006.

== Chart performance ==
"Every Mile a Memory" debuted at number 45 on the U.S. Billboard Hot Country Songs for the week of July 15, 2006.

Chart (2006)	Peak position
Canada Country (Billboard)	2
US Billboard Hot 100	48
US Hot Country Songs (Billboard)	1

=== Year-end charts ===
Chart (2006)	Position
US Country Songs (Billboard)	32

== Certifications ==
Region	Certification	Certified units/sales
United States (RIAA)	Gold	500,000^{‡}
^{‡} Sales+streaming figures based on certification alone.
