= Lot of Leavin' Left to Do =

Single by Dierks Bentley

from the album Modern Day Drifter
- B-side: "Come a Little Closer"
- Released: January 11, 2005
- Recorded: 2004–05
- Genre: Country
- Length: 4:32
- Label: Capitol Nashville
- Songwriters: Deric Ruttan; Brett Beavers; Dierks Bentley
- Producers: Brett Beavers; Dierks Bentley

Dierks Bentley singles chronology
"How Am I Doin'" (2004)	"Lot of Leavin' Left to Do" (2005)	"Come a Little Closer" (2005)

"Lot of Leavin' Left to Do" is a song co-written and recorded by American country music artist Dierks Bentley. It was released in January 2005 as the first single from his 2005 album Modern Day Drifter. The song peaked at number 3 on the U.S. Billboard Hot Country Songs chart. Bentley wrote this song with Deric Ruttan and Brett Beavers.

== Content ==
This song is about Dierks being on the road and having a hard time with relationships. The lyric "So lovin' me might be a long shot gamble / So before ya go and turn me on / Be sure you can turn me loose / 'Cause I still got a lot of leavin' left to do" is a warning to any potential love interest that you shouldn't "fall for [him]" because he is on the road 365 days a year.

== Critical reception ==
Deborah Evans Price of Billboard reviewed the song favorably, calling it a "personality packed uptempo number" "with the driving lead guitar and macho-lover lyric." She goes on to say that the song is "reminiscent of Waylon Jennings at his charismatic outlaw best." On Bentley's vocals, she says that he "infuses the lyric with reckless, sexy charm." In 2017, Billboard contributor Chuck Dauphin put "Lot of Leavin' Left to Do" at number eight on his top 10 list of Bentley's best songs.

== Music video ==
The music video was directed by Sam Erickson. It reached number 1 on CMT's Top 20 Countdown in the summer of 2005.

== Chart positions ==
"Lot of Leavin' Left to Do" debuted at number 46 on the U.S. Billboard Hot Country Songs for the week of February 5, 2005. When the song peaked at number 3 on the June 4, 2005 chart, the Top 3 songs on the country chart were all by artists on Capitol Records. This was only the third time since 1990 that the same label had the Top 3 singles on that chart.

Chart (2005)	Peak position
Canada Country (Radio & Records)	1
US Billboard Hot 100	47
US Hot Country Songs (Billboard)	3

=== Year-end charts ===
Chart (2005)	Position
US Country Songs (Billboard)	16

== Certifications ==
Region	Certification	Certified units/sales
United States (RIAA)	Gold	500,000^{‡}
^{‡} Sales+streaming figures based on certification alone.
