= Deric Ruttan =

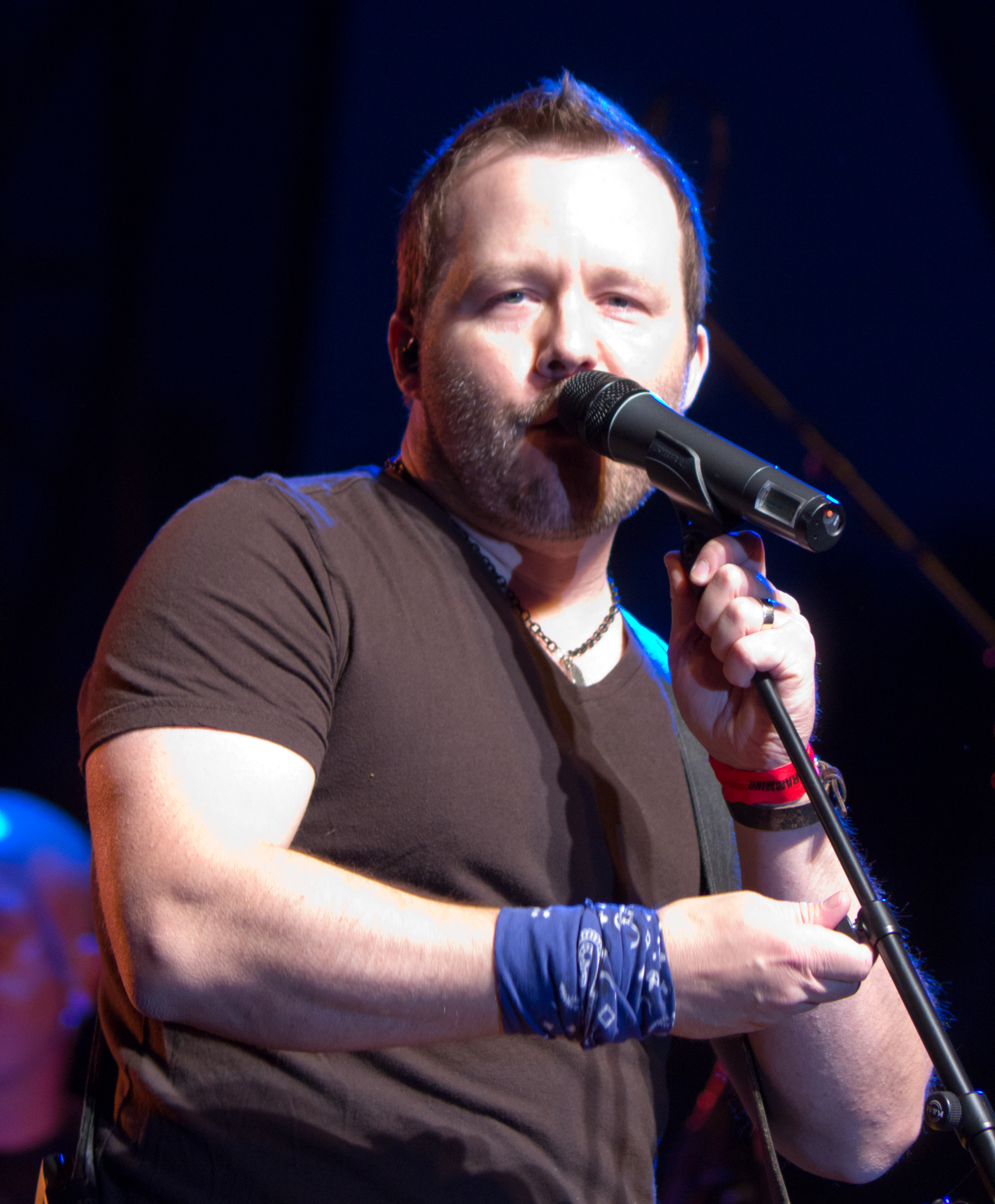
- Ruttan performing at the 2012 Burlington's Sound of Music Festival

Background information
- Born: January 27, 1972 (age 54)
- Origin: Bracebridge, Ontario, Canada
- Genres: Country
- Occupations: Singer; songwriter
- Instruments: Vocals; guitar; harmonica; drums
- Years active: 2003–present
- Labels: Lyric Street; On Ramp; Black T

Deric J. Ruttan (born January 27, 1972) is a Canadian country music singer, songwriter and record producer from Bracebridge, Ontario, Canada. A Nashville, Tennessee resident, he has released four studio albums and has written or co-written more than 60 songs that have been recorded by other recording artists.

== Breakthrough ==
Deric moved to Nashville in 1994 to pursue his music career, spending his days writing songs and his nights scouring the city getting ideas and learning from local singer-songwriters. He got his break in 1999 when producer Steve Bogard heard one of Deric's tapes and liked it. Steve signed Deric to a songwriting deal and immediately began recording his first demos. After Doug Howard at Lyric Street Records heard his demo and Deric played five songs live for Randy Goodman, Deric entered a record deal with the label. In 2003, he released his debut album, Deric Ruttan.

== Songwriting ==
In 2003, just as his first single "When You Come Around," was released, he celebrated his first No. 1 as a songwriter when friend and collaborator Dierks Bentley took the Ruttan/Bentley/Brett Beavers co-write "What Was I Thinkin'" to the top of the charts in the US. The song helped set Bentley on the path to country stardom. (To date, Bentley has recorded six Ruttan co-writes, including the 2005 chart-topper Lot of Leavin' Left To Do.) In 2004 Ruttan's "My Way", recorded by Aaron Pritchett, was the most-played Canadian country song of that year. Capitol Nashville's Eric Church had an American Billboard hit with his and Ruttan's "Guys Like Me" in 2007, and cuts on other acts followed, on artists like Gary Allan, Paul Brandt, Doc Walker, Jason Blaine, and The Higgins.

In September 2007, Ruttan was awarded his first Canadian Country Music Award (CCMA) for Songwriter of the Year (along with co-writers Aaron Pritchett and Mitch Merrett), for "Hold My Beer", recorded by Pritchett. He won the CCMA for songwriter of the year once again in 2014 for "Mine Would Be You," recorded by Blake Shelton.

Ruttan has written and co-written songs for prominent country musicians including Dierks Bentley ("What Was I Thinkin'" and "Lot of Leavin' Left to Do"), Aaron Pritchett ("Hold My Beer" and "My Way"), Jason Aldean ("Any Ol' Barstool"), Eric Church ("Guys Like Me" and "Hell on the Heart"),Blake Shelton ("Mine Would Be You" and "Came Here to Forget"), and most recently, Maddie and Tae ("Die From a Broken Heart").

Since 2011, Deric has written for Nashville-based publishing company THiS Music. He renewed his deal with THiS Music in 2016.

== As a recording artist ==
It took over four years for Ruttan to follow up his 2003 self-titled release. In 2008 he released his second album, aptly titled First Time in a Long Time, which yielded four hit radio singles at Canadian country radio: the title track, "Lovin' You Is Killin' Me", "California Plates" (co-written with members of Manitoba country band Doc Walker), and "Good Time", a duet with Bentley. (The video for "Good Time" reached No. 1 on CMT Canada's video countdown).

"It wasn't just that writing songs for other artists was taking time away from me writing my next record", says Ruttan. "It was that suddenly I was known as a guy who'd written radio hits for other acts – the bar had been raised for me, creatively, because of that. I felt the next record I made needed to be really, really good."

At the 2008 Canadian Country Music Awards, Ruttan earned a total of four nominations – "Male Artist", "Songwriter", "Record Producer", and "Best Album," and closed the show performing alongside The Guess Who/Bachman Turner Overdrive guitar legend Randy Bachman. By the following year, "First Time In A Long Time" had garnered so much radio airplay that it earned Ruttan and co-writer Jimmy Rankin a SOCAN Country Music Award at the 2009 SOCAN Awards in Toronto.

In January 2010, with "Sunshine," Deric began releasing albums on his own independent label, Black T Records. He captured live audio on Sunshine's supporting tour to create 2011's live album, "Up All Night – Deric Ruttan Live." He released his most recent album, "Take the Week Off," in October 2013.

He has found success as an artist on Canadian country radio, and he continues to balance touring to support his albums with songwriting at home. "I’ve never been happier with the balance in my career," he says. "I tour about as much as I’d ever want to. Jason Blaine, Chad Brownlee and I recently did 25 shows across Canada in the Your Town Throwdown tour, and I played festivals in the summer. That lets me get my performance ya-yas out, and I’m in Nashville writing the rest of the time. Considering I haven’t lived there in 20 years, I feel really embraced by Canada."

== Discography ==
=== Studio albums ===
Title	Details
Deric Ruttan	Release date: September 9, 2003; Label: Lyric Street Records
First Time in a Long Time	Release date: April 1, 2008; Label: On Ramp Records
Sunshine	Release date: January 12, 2010; Label: Black T Records
Take the Week Off	Release date: October 15, 2013; Label: Black T Records

=== Live albums ===
Title	Details
Up All Night – Deric Ruttan Live	Release date: September 20, 2011; Label: Black T Records

=== Singles ===
==== 2000s ====
Year	Single	Peak positions			Album
Year	Single	CAN Country	CAN	US Country	Album
2003	"When You Come Around"	—	—	46	Deric Ruttan
2003	"Unbeatable"	—	—	—	Deric Ruttan
2004	"I Saved Everything"	16	—	—	Deric Ruttan
2005	"Take the Wheel"	10	—	—	Deric Ruttan
2005	"Shine"	7	—	—	Deric Ruttan
2006	"Invisible"	13	—	—	Deric Ruttan
2007	"Good Time" (with Dierks Bentley)	11	—	—	First Time in a Long Time
2008	"First Time in a Long Time"	10	96	—	First Time in a Long Time
2008	"Lovin' You Is Killin' Me"	17	—	—	First Time in a Long Time
2009	"California Plates"	14	—	—	First Time in a Long Time
2009	"Almost Beautiful"	13	—	—	First Time in a Long Time
2009	"Sing That Song Again"	13	—	—	Sunshine
"—" denotes releases that did not chart

==== 2010s ====
Year	Single	Peak positions		Album
Year	Single	CAN Country	CAN	Album
2010	"Up All Night"	7	91	Sunshine
2010	"That's How I Wanna Go Out"	6	87	Sunshine
2011	"Sunshine (Hey Little Girl)"	23	—	Sunshine
2011	"She's Like a Song"	16	—	Up All Night – Deric Ruttan Live
2012	"Main Street, 1979"	16	—	Up All Night – Deric Ruttan Live
2012	"My Kind of Freedom"	17	—	Up All Night – Deric Ruttan Live
2013	"Where the Train Don't Stop"	11	—	Up All Night – Deric Ruttan Live
2013	"Take the Week Off"	10	66	Take the Week Off
2014	"Pass It Around"	17	—	Take the Week Off
2014	"Country Mile"	—	—	Take the Week Off
2014	"Good Thing Gone"	42	—	Take the Week Off
2015	"Don't It Feel Good"	—	—	Take the Week Off
"—" denotes releases that did not chart

=== Music videos ===
Year	Video	Director
2003	"When You Come Around"	Trey Fanjoy
2003	"Unbeatable"	
2005	"Take the Wheel"	
2005	"Love Did"	
2007	"Good Time" (with Dierks Bentley)	Antonio Hrynchuk
2008	"First Time in a Long Time"	Antonio Hrynchuk
2008	"Lovin' You Is Killin' Me"	Joel Stewart
2009	"California Plates"	Joel Stewart
2010	"That's How I Wanna Go Out"	Warren P. Sonoda
2011	"Sunshine (Hey Little Girl)"	Warren P. Sonoda
2012	"Main Street, 1979"	Jeth Weinrich
2012	"My Kind of Freedom"	John Fucile/Lisa Fucile/Deric Ruttan
2013	"Take the Week Off"	Margaret Malandruccolo
2014	"Pass It Around"	Margaret Malandruccolo
2014	"Good Thing Gone"	Paul McGuire

== Awards and nominations ==
Year	Association	Category	Result
2003	Canadian Country Music Association	Chevy Trucks Rising Star Award	Nominated
2004	Canadian Country Music Association	Male Artist of the Year	Nominated
2004	Canadian Country Music Association	Chevy Trucks Rising Star Award	Nominated
2004	Canadian Country Music Association	Album of the Year – Deric Ruttan	Nominated
2005	Canadian Country Music Association	Male Artist of the Year	Nominated
2007	Canadian Country Music Association	SOCAN Songwriter of the Year – "Hold My Beer"	Won
2008	Canadian Country Music Association	Male Artist of the Year	Nominated
2008	Canadian Country Music Association	Album of the Year – First Time in a Long Time	Nominated
2008	Canadian Country Music Association	Songwriter of the Year – "First Time in a Long Time"	Nominated
2011	Juno Awards of 2011	Country Album of the Year – Sunshine	Nominated
2011	Canadian Country Music Association	Male Artist of the Year	Nominated
2011	Canadian Country Music Association	Single of the Year – "That's How I Wanna Go Out"	Nominated
2011	Canadian Country Music Association	Songwriter of the Year – "That's How I Wanna Go Out"	Nominated
2011	Canadian Country Music Association	CMT Video of the Year – "That's How I Wanna Go Out"	Nominated
2012	Canadian Country Music Association	Songwriter of the Year – "They Don't Make 'Em Like That Anymore"	Nominated
2012	Canadian Country Music Association	Songwriter of the Year – "Main Street, 1979"	Nominated
2013	Canadian Country Music Association	Single of the Year – "Main Street, 1979"	Nominated
2013	Canadian Country Music Association	Songwriter of the Year – "Cool"	Nominated
2014	56th Annual Grammy Awards	Grammy Award for Best Country Song – "Mine Would Be You"	Nominated
2014	Canadian Country Music Association	Single of the Year – "Take the Week Off"	Nominated
2014	Canadian Country Music Association	Songwriter of the Year – "Mine Would Be You"	Won
2014	Canadian Country Music Association	CMT Video of the Year – "Take the Week Off"	Nominated
2015	Canadian Country Music Association	Songwriter of the Year – "Country Side"	Nominated
2017	Country Music Association of Ontario	Male Artist of the Year	Nominated
2017	Country Music Association of Ontario	Songwriter of the Year – "Came Here to Forget" (with Craig Wiseman)	Won
2022	Canadian Country Music Association	Songwriter of the Year – "Whiskey Does" (with Tim Hicks, Monty Criswell)	Nominated
2022	Canadian Country Music Association	Record Producer of the Year - "Whiskey Does"	Nominated
2023	Canadian Country Music Association	Record Producer of the Year - Talk to Time (with Jeff Coplan)	Nominated
2025	Country Music Association of Ontario	Record Producer of the Year – "Still Make Cowgirls"	Nominated
2025	Country Music Association of Ontario	Songwriter(s) of the Year – "Quits" (with Tim Hicks, Monty Criswell)	Nominated
2025	Country Music Association of Ontario	Songwriter(s) of the Year – "Still Make Cowgirls" (with Karli June)	Nominated
