= Jim Beavers =

American country music songwriter

Jim Beavers is an American country music songwriter. His older brother, Brett Beavers is also a noted country music songwriter and producer.

== Early life and education ==
Jim Beavers was born in Midland, Texas, and grew up in Garland and Jacksonville, Texas. His educational background includes a BBA from Baylor University and an MBA from Vanderbilt University.

== Career ==
Beavers started playing banjo and guitar at age 13. While attending college, Beavers was a founding member of Sons of the Desert. After he left the band, they went on to sign a record deal with MCA and notably sing background vocals on his high school friend Lee Ann Womack's hit "I Hope You Dance". Beavers moved to Nashville in 1991 to pursue a career on the business side of music. His work experience prior to songwriting includes stints as director of marketing for Capitol Records and Virgin Records, professor at Middle Tennessee State University, and touring musician with Lee Ann Womack.

Since 2002, Beavers has focused primarily on songwriting. He has had dozens of songs recorded by artists such as Chris Stapleton, Luke Bryan, Dierks Bentley, Tim McGraw, Hootie and the Blowfish, Toby Keith, Billy Strings, Brooks & Dunn, Thomas Rhett, Gavin Adcock, Gary Allan, Blake Shelton, Miranda Lambert, Josh Turner, Billy Currington, Trace Adkins, Brad Paisley, and Faith Hill among others.

Beavers has also been successful in Texas music, bluegrass and comedy. In Texas music, he has written several #1 songs with artists such as Randy Rogers, Wade Bowen, and the band Kin Faux, who he produced two projects on. In bluegrass, he co-wrote the 2021 International Bluegrass Music Association song of the year "Richest Man" by Balsam Range and has several hit songs by Irish bluegrass artist Danny Burns. On the comedy front, he has written songs for Cledus T. Judd, Bobby Bones and Hot Country Knights, who he co-produces with Dierks Bentley.

Beavers primarily plays guitar and sometimes banjo. He played bass and provided background vocals on the Toby Keith hit "Red Solo Cup."

Beavers' compositions have received multiple Country Music Association (CMA), Academy of Country Music (ACM), Broadcast Music, Inc. (BMI), and Nashville Songwriters Association International (NSAI) nominations and awards. He has been named Sony Music Publishing's Songwriter of the Year four times. To date, Beavers has co-written nine number-one songs and received fifteen BMI awards.

Beavers was elected and served as Chairman of the Country Music Association (CMA) in 2022.

In 2027, Beavers will be inducted into the Texas Songwriters Hall of Fame in Austin, Texas.

== Notable songs written by Jim Beavers ==
- "Old Tricks" – Thomas Rhett feat. Niall Horan, former member of One Direction
- "High Note" – Dierks Bentley feat. Billy Strings
- "Richest Man" (IBMA Song of the Year 2021) – Balsam Range
- "Pick Her Up" – Hot Country Knights featuring Travis Tritt
- "Hold On" – Hootie & the Blowfish
- "Just a Phase" – Adam Craig
- "Parachute" – Chris Stapleton
- "Love You Like That" – Canaan Smith
- "Drink a Beer" – Luke Bryan
- "American Heart" – Faith Hill
- "5-1-5-0" – Dierks Bentley
- "Lovin' You Is Fun" – Easton Corbin
- "Red Solo Cup" – Toby Keith
- "Am I the Only One" – Dierks Bentley
- "Felt Good on My Lips" – Tim McGraw
- "Why Don't We Just Dance" – Josh Turner
- "Sideways" – Dierks Bentley
- "Trying to Stop Your Leaving" – Dierks Bentley
- "Don't" – Billy Currington
- "Watching Airplanes" – Gary Allan
- "How Am I Doin'" – Dierks Bentley (as "Writer X")
