= Brett Beavers =

American songwriter

- Origin: Waco, Texas
- Genres: Country
- Occupations: Songwriter, producer
- Instrument: Bass

Brett Beavers (born in Waco, Texas) is an American country music songwriter and producer and a co-author of a book, Something Worth Leaving Behind.

== Education and early career ==
Beavers attended Baylor University in Waco, Texas, where he earned a bachelor of science degree in secondary education in 1985.

After college, Beavers played bass in a country band that performed at dance clubs and honky-tonks around Waco, which he credited with helping him understand song structure and develop as a songwriter. Beavers was also a former member of Mack Abernathy’s band.

He married and taught high school science in Tyler, Texas southeast of Dallas during a year off and moved to Nashville to join a band with Deryl Dodd.

Shortly after arriving in Nashville, Beavers began touring with Martina McBride as a bass player and bandleader from 1992 to 1996. He performed in the same capacity with Lee Ann Womack from 1997 to 2005. During that time, he started a publishing company and his songs started to be recorded by Tim McGraw, Billy Ray Cyrus, and other artists. In 2005, he stopped performing and touring to pursue songwriting and being a producer. His brother, Jim, is also a Nashville songwriter.

== With Dierks Bentley ==
Much of Beavers' success has been in tandem with Dierks Bentley; he produces and a co-writer of several of Bentley's songs, a collaboration which began in 2001. The partnership has produced several number-one Hot Country Songs including "Sideways", "Come a Little Closer", "Feel That Fire", and "Every Mile a Memory". In addition they were given a SOCAN and NSAI Achievement Award for "What Was I Thinkin'", a BMI Award Most Performed Song award for "Trying to Stop Your Leaving", and they received Grammy Award nominations for Best Country Song, "Long Trip Alone" and for Country Song of the Year, "Every Mile a Memory". The songs which he has written and produced for Bentley led to Beavers winning BMI Country Awards each year from 2006 to 2009.

== Author ==
Along with Tom Douglas, Beavers wrote Something Worth Leaving Behind, an inspirational book based on a song with the same name which they co-wrote for Lee Ann Womack.
