= I Can Wait Forever =

I Can Wait Forever may refer to:

- "I Can Wait Forever", a 1984 song by Air Supply from Ghostbusters
- "I Can Wait Forever", a 2008 song by Simple Plan from Simple Plan
