= Ghostbusters: Afterlife (soundtrack) =

2021 film soundtrack

Ghostbusters: Afterlife (Original Motion Picture Soundtrack)

Film score by Rob Simonsen
- Released: November 19, 2021
- Recorded: 2021
- Genre: Film score
- Length: 70:11
- Label: Sony Classical
- Producer: Curt Sobel

Ghostbusters: Afterlife (Original Motion Picture Soundtrack) is the soundtrack album for the film of the same name, released by Sony Classical Records on November 19, 2021. The film score includes new material composed by Rob Simonsen, conducted by Anthony Parnther, and performed by the Hollywood Studio Symphony, as well as utilizing material originally written by Elmer Bernstein for the original film.

== Development ==
Simonsen was confirmed to be scoring Ghostbusters: Afterlife, after doing so for Jason Reitman for Tully and The Front Runner. For Ghostbusters: Afterlife, Simonsen studied Elmer Bernstein's score from the original Ghostbusters. He approached Peter Bernstein to take on the role of score consultant, and Bernstein provided guidance on the orchestration of Simonsen's score, as well as the use of the material from Ghostbusters. Simonsen made use of the ondes Martenot throughout the score, played by Cynthia Millar, who also played the same instrument on Elmer Bernstein's 1984 Ghostbusters score.

== Track listing ==
All music is composed by Rob Simonsen.

Track listing
No.	Title	Length
1.	"Trapped"	4:56
2.	"Dirt Farm"	3:29
3.	"Chess"	1:19
4.	"Summerville"	1:42
5.	"Research"	1:53
6.	"Under the Floor"	3:11
7.	"Nice Replica"	0:43
8.	"Culpable"	1:53
9.	"Laboratory"	3:59
10.	"Lab Partners"	2:03
11.	"Definitely Class Five"	2:07
12.	"Go Go Go"	0:39
13.	"Trap Him"	3:54
14.	"Don't Go Chasing Ghosts"	2:42
15.	"Mini-Pufts"	3:46
16.	"Down the Well"	4:14
17.	"The Temple Resurrected"	2:03
18.	"The Plan"	3:00
19.	"Suit Up"	2:09
20.	"No, I'm Twelve"	2:27
21.	"Getaway"	2:55
22.	"Callie"	2:31
23.	"Protecting the Farm"	5:41
24.	"Showdown"	2:31
25.	"Reconciliation"	4:36
Total length:		70:11

== Personnel ==
- Rob Simonsen - composer
- Curt Sobel - album producer, music editor
- The Hollywood Studio Symphony - orchestra
- Anthony Parnther - conductor
- Peter Bernstein - score consultant
- Mark Graham - orchestration
- William Ross - additional orchestration and conducting

== See also ==
- Ghostbusters (1984 soundtrack)
- Ghostbusters II (soundtrack)
- Ghostbusters (2016 soundtrack)
