= Ghostbusters II (soundtrack) =

1989 film soundtrack

Ghostbusters II is the soundtrack album for the film of the same name, released by MCA Records in 1989. The soundtrack includes the Billboard Hot 100 number two hit "On Our Own" performed by Bobby Brown, as well as Run-D.M.C.'s rendition of "Ghostbusters". The film score, Ghostbusters II: Original Motion Picture Score is composed by Randy Edelman. Since the release of the film in 1989, the complete film score was unreleased, until it was finally released on August 13, 2021.

== Ghostbusters II ==
Ghostbusters II

Soundtrack album by various artists
- Released: June 12, 1989
- Genres: Hip-hop, new jack swing, R&B
- Length: 44:55
- Label: MCA

Singles from Ghostbusters II
- 1. "On Our Own" Released: May 30, 1989; 2. "Ghostbusters" Released: July 12, 1989

=== Development ===
Ray Parker Jr. helped develop an updated version of his hit song "Ghostbusters", performed by Run-D.M.C. Aiming to replicate the success of the original soundtrack, producer Peter Afterman wanted to hire Bobby Brown, who had a recent succession of hit songs. To secure Brown's involvement, Afterman offered Brown's music label, MCA Records, the rights to the soundtrack. Brown agreed in exchange for receiving a role in the film. Filming had nearly concluded at that time, but Reitman wrote Brown a cameo as the mayor's doorman.

Brown worked with Dennis Austin, Larry White and Kirk Crumpler to write and produce "We're Back". Other songs on the soundtrack include "Flip City" by Glenn Frey, "Spirit" by Doug E. Fresh & The Get Fresh Crew, and "Love is a Cannibal" by Elton John. The song "Flesh 'n Blood" by composer Danny Elfman and Oingo Boingo was written for the film but Elfman said he was disappointed that only four musical bars of it were used. He thought the small usage was an excuse to be able to release it on the soundtrack and said if he had known he would have pulled the song.

=== Singles ===
Two singles were released from the album, Bobby Brown's "On Our Own" and Run-D.M.C.'s "Ghostbusters". Brown's single performed better, reaching number two on the Billboard Hot 100, while Run-D.M.C.'s did not chart. Music videos were released for both.

=== Track listing ===
No.	Title	Writer(s)	Performer	Length
1.	"On Our Own"	L.A. Reid; Babyface; Daryl Simmons	Bobby Brown	4:53
2.	"Supernatural"	Garry George Johnson; James Harris; Terry Lewis	New Edition	4:34
3.	"The Promised Land"	Bobby Caldwell; Paul Gordon	James "J.T." Taylor	3:22
4.	"We're Back"	Bobby Brown; Dennis Austin; Larry White; Kirk Crumpler	Bobby Brown	5:10
5.	"Spirit"	Doug E. Fresh; Bernard Wright	Doug E. Fresh & The Get Fresh Crew	4:14
6.	"Ghostbusters"	Ray Parker Jr.	Run-D.M.C.	4:10
7.	"Flesh 'n Blood"	Danny Elfman	Oingo Boingo	4:17
8.	"Love is a Cannibal"	Elton John; Bernie Taupin; Davey Johnstone	Elton John	3:53
9.	"Flip City"	Glenn Frey; David Wolinski	Glenn Frey	3:31
10.	"Higher and Higher"	Gary Lee Jackson; Carl William Smith; Raynard Miner	Howard Huntsberry	4:09
Total length:				44:55

The movie includes two versions of the song "(Your Love Keeps Lifting Me) Higher and Higher": Jackie Wilson's original version was used during the dancing toaster scene, and a cover by Howard Huntsberry was used during the Statue of Liberty scene. The soundtrack only included the Howard Huntsberry version.

=== Weekly charts ===
Weekly chart performance for Ghostbusters II
Chart (1989)	Peak position
Canada Top Albums/CDs (RPM)	18
New Zealand Albums (RMNZ)	48
US Billboard 200	14
US Top R&B/Hip-Hop Albums (Billboard)	24

=== Year-end charts ===
1989 year-end chart performance for Ghostbusters II
Chart (1989)	Position
Canada Top Albums/CDs (RPM)	86
US Billboard 200	98

=== Certifications ===
Certifications and sales for Ghostbusters II
Region	Certification	Certified units/sales
Canada (Music Canada)	Gold	50,000^{^}
United States (RIAA)	Gold	500,000^{^}
^{^} Shipments figures based on certification alone.

== Ghostbusters II: Original Motion Picture Score ==
Ghostbusters II: Original Motion Picture Score

Film score by Randy Edelman
- Released: August 13, 2021
- Recorded: 1989
- Genre: Film score
- Length: 45:07
- Label: Sony Classical
- Producer: Randy Edelman

=== Development ===
Randy Edelman composed the score for Ghostbusters II. It was one of Edelman's first experiences working with a large scale orchestra. Although familiar with Ghostbusters, he chose not to re-watch it for inspiration so the sequel would have its own unique sound. Edelman believed the distinct personalities of the existing characters meant they rarely needed a musical accompaniment, and instead focused his efforts on scoring the supernatural and action setpieces to represent the menace and "dark nature of the evil Carpathian".

=== Track listing ===
All music is composed by Randy Edelman.

No.	Title	Length
1.	"A Few Friends Save Manhattan"	2:00
2.	"A Baby Carriage Meets Heavy Traffic"	2:00
3.	"Venkman's 6th Avenue Strut"	3:04
4.	"Order in the Court"	3:46
5.	"He's Got Carpathian Eyes"	2:32
6.	"The Sensitive Side of Dana"	4:07
7.	"In Liberty's Shadow"	3:47
8.	"Rooftop Broom Kidnap"	3:47
9.	"The Scoleri Brothers"	2:17
10.	"Oscar is Quietly Surrounded"	4:22
11.	"A Slime Darkened Doorway"	2:23
12.	"One Leaky Sewer Faucet"	1:11
13.	"Vigo's Last Stand"	3:01
14.	"Good with Kids"	1:22
15.	"Enlightenment"	1:32
16.	"Family Portrait - Finale"	3:48
Total length:		45:07

== See also ==
- Ghostbusters (1984 soundtrack)
- Ghostbusters (2016 soundtrack)
- Ghostbusters: Afterlife (soundtrack)
