= On Our Own (Bobby Brown song) =

1989 single by Bobby Brown

Single by Bobby Brown

from the album Ghostbusters II
- Released: May 30, 1989
- Genre: New jack swing
- Length: 4:55
- Label: MCA
- Songwriters: L.A. Reid; Babyface; Daryl Simmons
- Producers: L.A. Reid; Babyface

Bobby Brown singles chronology
"Every Little Step" (1989)	"On Our Own" (1989)	"Rock Wit'cha" (1989)

"On Our Own" is a song by American singer Bobby Brown from the soundtrack of the 1989 Columbia motion picture Ghostbusters II. It was released as a single on May 30, 1989. It peaked at number one on the US Billboard Hot Black Singles chart for one week and at number two on the Billboard Hot 100 for three weeks. Outside the US, it reached number one in Canada and New Zealand and became a top-five hit in Ireland and the United Kingdom.

== Music video ==
The video was filmed in May 1989 and released in June. The video features several guest appearances by celebrities including Jane Curtin, Malcolm Forbes, Iman, Sally Kirkland, Rick Moranis, Joey and Marky Ramone of the Ramones, Christopher Reeve, Nona Hendryx, Lori Singer, Doug E. Fresh, Big Daddy Kane and Donald Trump. Additionally, there are scenes from Ghostbusters II, interspersed with New York City locations such as the Trump Tower, World Trade Center, and Plaza Hotel.

== Track listings ==
- US 12-inch vinyl single

A1. "On Our Own" (extended club version) – 6:29
B1. "On Our Own" (radio edit) – 4:53
B2. "On Our Own" (instrumental) – 4:37

- European 12-inch vinyl single

A1. "On Our Own" (extended club version) – 6:29
B1. "On Our Own" (7-inch version) – 4:15
B2. "On Our Own" (instrumental) – 4:37

- UK CD single
1. "On Our Own" (7-inch version with rap) – 4:31
2. "On Our Own" (instrumental) – 4:37
3. "On Our Own" (12-inch version) – 6:29
- Australian 7-inch vinyl single

A. "On Our Own" – 4:15
B. "On Our Own" (with rap) – 4:30

== Personnel ==
- Bobby Brown – lead vocals, rap
- L.A. Reid – drums, percussion
- Babyface – keyboards, backing vocals
- Kayo – synthesized bass
- Donald Parks – Fairlight programming
- Daryl Simmons, Melvin Edmonds, Kevon Edmonds, Keith Mitchell – backing vocals
- Louil Silas Jr. – executive producer

== Charts ==
=== Weekly charts ===
Chart (1989–1990)	Peak position
Australia (ARIA)	22
Belgium (Ultratop 50 Flanders)	35
Canada Retail Singles (The Record)	1
Canada Top Singles (RPM)	3
Canada Dance/Urban (RPM)	1
Europe (Eurochart Hot 100)	18
Ireland (IRMA)	5
Italy Airplay (Music & Media)	4
Netherlands (Dutch Top 40 Tipparade)	6
Netherlands (Single Top 100)	40
New Zealand (Recorded Music NZ)	1
UK Singles (Official Charts)	4
US Billboard Hot 100	2
US Dance Club Songs (Billboard)	15
US Dance Singles Sales (Billboard)	2
US Hot R&B/Hip-Hop Songs (Billboard)	1
West Germany (GfK)	18

=== Year-end charts ===
Chart (1989)	Position
Canada Top Singles (RPM)	35
Canada Dance/Urban (RPM)	3
New Zealand (RIANZ)	44
UK Singles (OCC)	52
US Billboard Hot 100	19
US 12-inch Singles Sales (Billboard)	18
US Hot Black Singles (Billboard)	33

== Certifications ==
Region	Certification	Certified units/sales
United Kingdom (BPI)	Silver	200,000^{^}
United States (RIAA)	Platinum	1,000,000^{^}
^{^} Shipments figures based on certification alone.

== Release history ==
Region	Date	Format(s)	Label(s)	Ref.
United States	May 30, 1989	7-inch vinyl; 12-inch vinyl; cassette	MCA	
United Kingdom	July 3, 1989	7-inch vinyl; 12-inch vinyl; CD; cassette	MCA	
Japan	July 10, 1989	Mini-CD	MCA	
