= Ghostbusters (song) =

1984 single by Ray Parker Jr.

- One of European variants of non-US artwork

Single by Ray Parker Jr.

from the album Ghostbusters: Original Soundtrack Album
- B-side: "Ghostbusters" (instrumental)
- Released: June 8, 1984
- Recorded: 1983
- Genre: Dance-pop; synth-rock
- Length: 4:06 (soundtrack version); 3:56 (edit)
- Label: Arista
- Songwriter: Ray Parker Jr.
- Producer: Ray Parker Jr.

Ray Parker Jr. singles chronology
"Woman Out of Control" (1984)	"Ghostbusters" (1984)	"Jamie" (1984)

Music video
- "Ghostbusters" on YouTube

Alternative release
- Side A of the US single

"Ghostbusters" is a song written by American musician Ray Parker Jr. as the theme to the 1984 film Ghostbusters, and included on its soundtrack. Debuting at number 68 on June 16, 1984, the song peaked at No. 1 on the Billboard Hot 100 on August 11, staying there for three weeks (Parker's only number one on that chart), and at No. 2 on the UK singles chart on September 16, staying there for three weeks. The song reentered the UK Top 75 on November 2, 2008 at No. 49 and again on November 5, 2021, at No. 38.

The song was nominated at the 57th Academy Awards for Best Original Song but lost to Stevie Wonder's "I Just Called to Say I Love You". A lawsuit accusing Parker of basing the song's melody on Huey Lewis and the News's song "I Want a New Drug" resulted in Lewis receiving a settlement.

== Background ==
Parker was approached by the film's producers to create a theme song, although he only had a few days to do so. Parker had been specifically instructed to include the film's title in the lyrics, but struggled to find a way to do so. However, when watching television late at night, Parker saw a cheap commercial for a local service that reminded him that the film had a similar commercial featured for the fictional business. This inspired him to include the phrase "Who ya gonna call?", which allows a crowd to respond with "Ghostbusters!" sparing him from needing to sing the phrase.

Lindsey Buckingham, on his interview disc Words & Music [A Retrospective], stated that he was approached to write the Ghostbusters theme based on his successful contribution to National Lampoon's Vacation, "Holiday Road". He declined the opportunity. Glenn Hughes and Pat Thrall also submitted a demo that was ultimately rejected. The Hughes and Thrall version was later rewritten and used as the track "Dance or Die" for the 1987 film Dragnet.

The theme is estimated to have added $20 million to the film's box-office gross.

== Music video ==
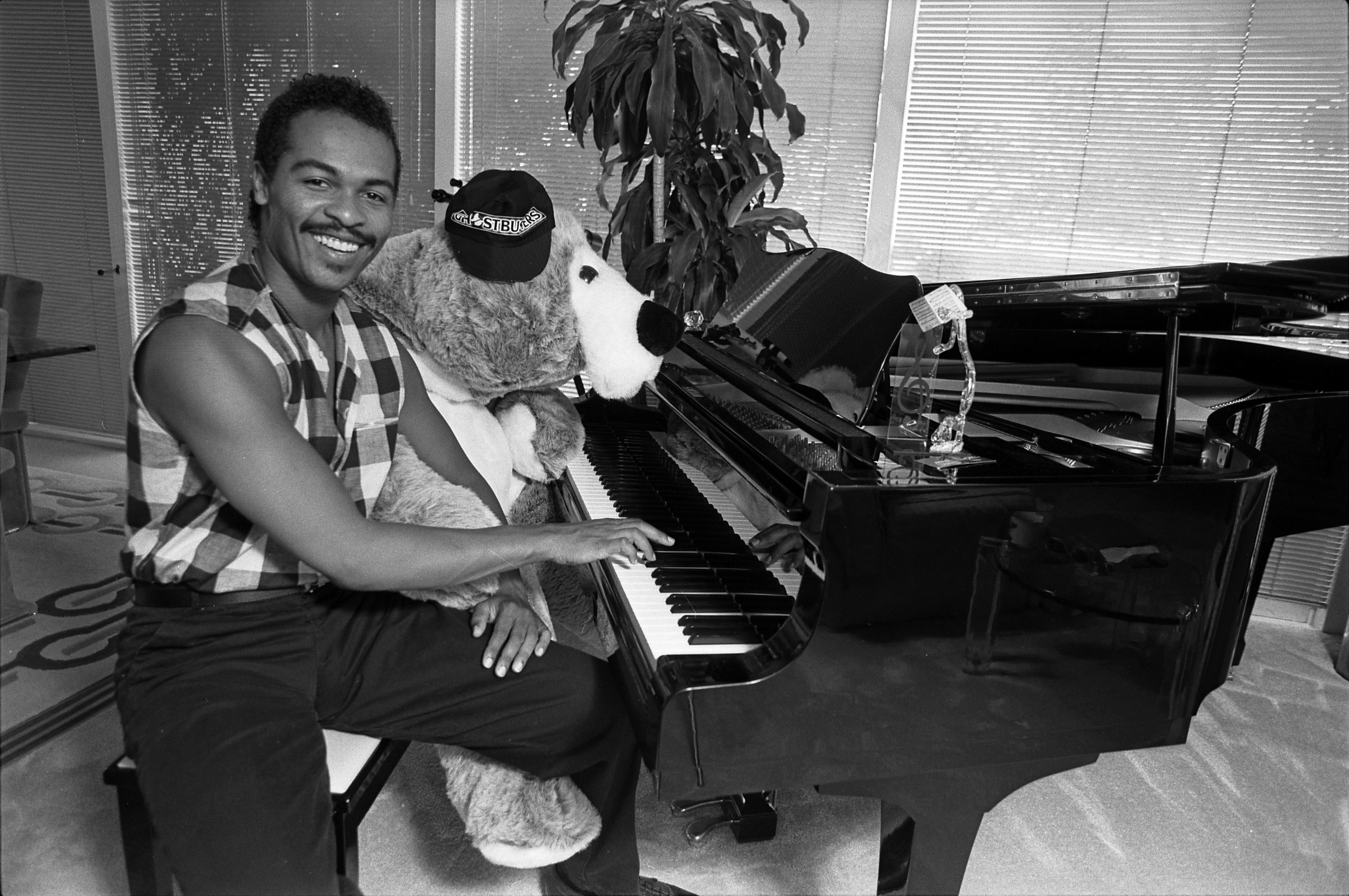
Parker on "Ghostbusters": "I was the last resort. I really didn't think I could do it."

The music video for the song was directed by Ivan Reitman, who also directed the Ghostbusters film, and produced by Jeffrey Abelson. It features a young woman played by actress Cindy Harrell who is haunted by a ghost portrayed by Parker, roaming a nearly all-black house interior (with vibrant neon designs outlining the sparse architectural and industrial features) until the woman finally calls the service.

Directed by Reitman, the "Ghostbusters" music video was No. 1 on MTV and features cameos from Chevy Chase, Irene Cara, John Candy, Melissa Gilbert, Ollie E. Brown, Jeffrey Tambor, George Wendt, Al Franken, Danny DeVito, Carly Simon, Peter Falk and Teri Garr. None were paid for participating but did so as a favor to Reitman.

The video concludes with Parker and the stars of the film, in full Ghostbuster costume, dancing down the streets of New York City. Times Square was closed in order to film the scene, although a sizable crowd may still be seen in the background. The Ghostbusters also perform the same dance in the closing credits to The Real Ghostbusters, the cartoon spin-off, as well as in a trailer for Ghostbusters: The Video Game (2009).

== Lawsuit ==
Shortly after the film's release, Huey Lewis sued Ray Parker Jr. for plagiarism, alleging that Parker had copied the melody from Lewis's 1983 song "I Want a New Drug". The case was settled out of court in 1985 for an undisclosed sum and a confidentiality agreement that prohibited discussion of the case. According to Parker, there were several lawsuits at the time, because "when you sell that many records, I think everybody wants to say that they wrote the song." Parker later sued Lewis for breaching the confidentiality agreement in a 2001 episode of VH1's Behind the Music by reasserting that Parker stole the song. Regarding his case against Lewis, Parker said, "I got a lot of money out of that." Lewis said it was at least $30,000 in an interview with Dutch television NPO.

In a 2004 article for Premiere magazine, the filmmakers acknowledged they used the song "I Want a New Drug" as temporary background music in the montage for test screenings prior to hiring Parker.

== Personnel ==
- Ray Parker Jr. – lead vocals, electric guitars, Korg Poly-61 and Roland Jupiter-6 synthesizers, Roland MSQ700 sequencer, LinnDrum programming, maracas, cowbells, Simmons drums
- Charles "Chazzy" Green – saxophone
- Martin Page – keyboards, atmospheric synthesizer effects
- Brian Fairweather – rhythm and lead rock guitar
- Unknown – backing vocals

== Track listing ==
=== 7-inch Arista / ARI 8391 (US), ARIST 580 (UK) ===
Side one

1. "Ghostbusters" – 3:56

Side two

1. "Ghostbusters" (instrumental) – 4:07

== Charts and certifications ==
Ray Parker, Jr.'s "Ghostbusters" reached number one on the Billboard Hot 100 chart on August 11, 1984, two months after the film's release, and remained there for three weeks. It spent a total of 21 weeks on the charts.

=== Weekly charts ===
1984–1985 weekly chart performance for "Ghostbusters"
Chart (1984–1985)	Peak position
Argentina (CAPIF)	1
Australia (Kent Music Report)	2
Austria (Ö3 Austria Top 40)	8
Belgium (Ultratop 50 Flanders)	1
Canada Adult Contemporary (RPM)	6
Canada Top Singles (RPM)	1
Canada (The Record)	1
France (SNEP)	1
Ireland (IRMA)	4
Italy (Musica e dischi)	5
Netherlands (Dutch Top 40)	4
Netherlands (Single Top 100)	5
New Zealand (Recorded Music NZ)	2
Norway (VG-lista)	2
South Africa (Springbok Radio)	1
Spain (AFYVE)	1
Sweden (Sverigetopplistan)	2
Switzerland (Schweizer Hitparade)	3
UK Singles (Official Charts)	2
US Billboard Hot 100	1
US Dance Club Songs (Billboard)	6
US Hot Black Singles (Billboard)	1
US Rock Albums & Top Tracks (Billboard)	38
West Germany (GfK)	4

2021–2025 weekly chart performance for "Ghostbusters"
Chart (2021–2026)	Peak position
Canada Hot 100 (Billboard)	7
Global 200 (Billboard)	19
Hungary (Single Top 40)	37
Japan Hot Overseas (Billboard Japan)	4
UK Singles (Official Charts)	21
Billboard Hot 100	12

=== Year-end charts ===
1984 year-end chart performance for "Ghostbusters"
Chart (1984)	Position
Australia (Kent Music Report)	3
Belgium (Ultratop)	17
Canada Top Singles (RPM)	4
Netherlands (Dutch Top 40)	26
Netherlands (Single Top 100)	57
New Zealand (Recorded Music NZ)	5
Switzerland (Schweizer Hitparade)	12
UK Singles (Gallup)	9
US Billboard Hot 100	9
US Cash Box Top 100	4
West Germany (Official German Charts)	39

1985 year-end chart performance for "Ghostbusters"
Chart (1985)	Position
Australia (Kent Music Report)	82

=== All-time charts ===
All-time chart performance for "Ghostbusters"
Chart	Position
UK Singles (Official Charts Company)	99

=== Certifications ===
Certifications and sales for "Ghostbusters"
Region	Certification	Certified units/sales
Canada (Music Canada)	Platinum	100,000^{^}
Denmark (IFPI Danmark)	Gold	45,000^{‡}
France (SNEP)	Platinum	1,000,000^{*}
New Zealand (RMNZ)	Platinum	30,000^{‡}
United Kingdom (BPI)	Platinum	1,170,587
United States (RIAA)	Gold	1,000,000^{^}
^{*} Sales figures based on certification alone.^{^} Shipments figures based on certification alone.^{‡} Sales+streaming figures based on certification alone.

== Other versions ==
=== Run-D.M.C. version ===
"Ghostbusters"

Single by Run-D.M.C.

from the album Ghostbusters II
- B-side: "Pause"
- Released: July 12, 1989
- Genre: Hip hop
- Length: 4:07; 6:00 (12" mix)
- Label: MCA; Profile
- Songwriters: Ray Parker Jr.; Joseph Simmons; Darryl McDaniels; Jason Mizell
- Producers: Jam Master Jay; Davy D

Run-D.M.C. singles chronology
"Run's House" (1988)	"Ghostbusters" / "Pause" (1989)	"What's It All About" (1990)

Audio video
- "Ghostbusters" on YouTube

For the soundtrack of the film's 1989 sequel, Ghostbusters II, Run-D.M.C. recorded a hip hop version of "Ghostbusters", featuring new lyrics. It was released on 7-inch vinyl and cassette as a standard single, as well as on 12-inch vinyl and CD as a double A-side maxi single with the track "Pause" from Run-D.M.C.'s fifth studio album, Back from Hell.

==== Music video ====
The song's music video begins with Sigourney Weaver and Annie Potts climbing out of a limousine in front of a large crowd, with Run-D.M.C., dressed in the standard beige Ghostbusters' uniform, accompanying them. The group then performs the song on stage to a packed audience for the remainder of the video, intercut with clips from the film. Bill Murray, Dan Aykroyd, and Ernie Hudson also cameo at the beginning of the video as security personnel.

==== Track listings ====
7" single / cassette

1. "Ghostbusters" – 4:07
2. "Ghostbusters" (Ghost Power instrumental) – 4:07

12" single

1. "Ghostbusters" – 6:00
2. "Ghostbusters" (dub buster) – 4:10
3. "Pause" – 6:00
4. "Pause" (dub version) – 3:32
5. "Pause" (radio version) – 3:46

CD single

1. "Ghostbusters" – 6:00
2. "Pause" – 6:00
3. "Pause" (dub version) – 3:32
4. "Pause" (radio version) – 3:46

==== Charts ====
Chart (1989)	Peak position
Australia (ARIA)	56
New Zealand (Recorded Music NZ)	34
UK Singles (Official Charts)	69

=== Xentrix version ===
"Ghost Busters"
- Replacement cover

Single by Xentrix
- B-side: "Nobody's Perfect"
- Released: 1990
- Recorded: 1990
- Genre: Thrash metal
- Length: 2:48
- Label: Roadrunner Records
- Songwriter: Ray Parker Jr.
- Producer

Banned Cover
- The banned cover

British thrash metal band Xentrix covered the song and it was released as a single in 1990. There was some controversy caused by the cover of the single, as the original artwork had an unauthorised use of the Ghostbusters logo (with the ghost giving the finger). The single was subsequently re-released using a different cover.

==== Track listings ====
12" single

1. "Ghost Busters" - 2:43
2. "Nobody's Perfect" - 3:41
3. "Interrogate" - 3:08

CD single

1. "Ghost Busters" - 2:43
2. "Nobody's Perfect" - 3:41
3. "Interrogate" - 3:08

Cassette single

1. "Ghost Busters" - 2:43
2. "Nobody's Perfect" - 3:41
3. "Interrogate" - 3:08

=== The Rasmus version ===
Finnish rock band the Rasmus recorded a cover of the song that was included on their debut album, Peep, and their third extended play, 3rd, both released in 1996. Their version reached number eight on the Finnish Singles Chart.

=== Mickael Turtle version ===
"Ghostbusters"

Single by Mickael Turtle
- Released: 2005
- Length: 2:26
- Label: Universal
- Songwriter: Ray Parker Jr.

Mickael Turtle singles chronology
"Ghostbusters" (2005)	"Super Freak" (2006)

In 2005, the original song was covered by the animated character Mickael Turtle, reaching No. 5 in France on December 3, 2005, and No. 23 in Switzerland on January 15, 2006.

==== Track listing ====
1. "Ghostbusters" (radio edit) – 2:26
2. "Ghostbusters" (extended club original mix) – 5:07
3. "Ghostbusters" (who's that remix long voix) – 6:15
4. "Ghostbusters" (extended club instrumental mix) – 5:07
5. "Ghostbusters" (who's that remix long dub) – 6:12
6. Mickael the Turtle – Teaser Video

==== Charts ====
Chart (2005)	Peak position
Australia (ARIA)	58
Belgium (Ultratop 50 Wallonia)	21
France (SNEP)	5
Germany (GfK)	56
Switzerland (Schweizer Hitparade)	23

Year-end chart (2005)	Position
France (SNEP)	50

==== Certifications ====
Region	Certification	Certified units/sales
France (SNEP)	Gold	200,000^{*}
^{*} Sales figures based on certification alone.

=== Gummibär version ===
"Ghostbusters"

Single by Gummibär

from the album The Gummy Bear Album
- Released: March 11, 2016
- Length: 2:42
- Label: Gummybear International
- Songwriter: Ray Parker Jr.

Gummibär singles chronology
"Children of the World (It's Christmas)" (2015)	"Ghostbusters" (2016)	"Dame La Gomita" (2018)

In 2015, German virtual artist Gummibär released his cover of the song for his fourth studio album The Gummy Bear Album (2019). It was eventually released as a single on March 11, 2016. The music video features a Gummibär mascot costume interacting with real-world environments in a ghost house. As of May 2026, it has over 10 million views on YouTube.

=== Fall Out Boy and Missy Elliott version ===
"Ghostbusters (I'm Not Afraid)"

Single by Fall Out Boy featuring Missy Elliott

from the album Ghostbusters: Original Motion Picture Soundtrack
- Released: June 23, 2016
- Recorded: 2016
- Genre: Dubstep, metal, dance-rock, rap rock
- Length: 3:07
- Label: RCA; Sony
- Songwriters: Ray Parker Jr.; Missy Elliott
- Producer: Fall Out Boy

Fall Out Boy singles chronology
"Irresistible" (2015)	"Ghostbusters (I'm Not Afraid)" (2016)	"Young and Menace" (2017)

Missy Elliott singles chronology
"This is For My Girls" (2016)	"Ghostbusters (I'm Not Afraid)" (2016)	"I'm Better" (2017)

Audio video
- "Ghostbusters (I'm Not Afraid)" on YouTube

"Ghostbusters (I'm Not Afraid)", a version of the song by American rock band Fall Out Boy, featuring hip hop recording artist Missy Elliott, was released on June 23, 2016, from the soundtrack of the 2016 reboot Ghostbusters. The cover received negative reviews from critics, who criticized its musical structure.

==== Charts ====
Chart (2016)	Peak position
Scottish Singles Sales (Official Charts)	70

=== Parodies ===
Over the years, a handful of local and national businesses across North America and around the world have done parodies of the Ghostbusters theme for advertising or promotional purposes, and used an instrumental version of either the original theme or a remake. The most notable parodies were used by CBS station KMOX-TV (now KMOV) in St. Louis, AutoNation, and the Carpet Mart chain of Central, Berks County, and Lehigh Valley Pennsylvania among others.

In the UK, the 118 118 directory assistance telephone service also used the Ghostbusters theme in one of their ads, and featured Ray Parker Jr. performing the parody. In Romania, Automobile Dacia released a television advertisement in 2018 for one of its models, the Duster, accompanied by the song, in an instrumental version, but with people in various costumes singing "Go, Duster!" when in the standard song the chorus says "Ghostbusters!".

American musician and comedian Neil Cicierega uses the song in "Bustin", released on his 2017 mashup album Mouth Moods.

== See also ==
- List of Billboard Hot 100 number-one singles of 1984

== Bibliography ==
- Austin, Bruce A. (1989). "Which Show to See?". Immediate Seating: A Look at Movie Audiences. Sydney: Wadsworth Publishing. ISBN 0-534-09366-3.
