= Good Girls (Elle King song) =

Single by Elle King

from the album Ghostbusters: Original Motion Picture Soundtrack
- Released: June 3, 2016
- Genre: Rockabilly; pop rock
- Length: 2:59
- Label: RCA
- Songwriter(s): Elle King; Dave Bassett
- Producer(s): Dave Bassett

Elle King singles chronology
"Different for Girls" (2016)	"Good Girls" (2016)	"Not Easy" (2016)

Music video
- "Good Girls" on YouTube

"Good Girls" is a song written and recorded by American singer Elle King from the soundtrack of Ghostbusters (2016). The song was co-written and produced by Dave Bassett. It was released digitally on June 3, 2016 through RCA Records as the soundtrack's lead single and impacted American Triple A radio on June 13.

Upon release, the song received positive reviews from music critics and attained a top 40 position on the Billboard Rock Songs chart.

== Composition ==
"Good Girls" is an uptempo rockabilly and pop rock song written by Elle King and Dave Bassett. According to the digital sheet music published by EMI Music Publishing, the song was originally composed in the key of E minor and set in common time to a "fast" tempo of 176 BPM. The song follows a chord progression of Em—A5—Em / Em—B7_{(no 3)}—Em—G, while King's vocals span a range of two octaves and one note, from B_{3} through C_{5}. Critics have also noted influences of soul and blues genres.

== Reception ==
=== Critical ===
In a review of the Ghostbusters soundtrack, James Monger of AllMusic praised "Good Girls" and "Get Ghost" as highlights, writing: "Mark Ronson... gets the vibe right on the hook-filled... "Get Ghost"..., and Elle King dispatches the sassy girl power jam "Good Girls" but the rest of the set feels rushed and forgettable". Michael Roffman of Consequence of Sound gave a glowing review of the song: "Much like her past earworms... ["Good Girls" is] nuclear, wired with dozens of hooks and made urgent by scandalous lyrics that go hand in hand with the majority of today's nihilistic pop".

=== Commercial ===
"Good Girls" debuted and peaked at number 29 on the Billboard Hot Rock Songs chart dated June 25, 2016. The song also entered the Rock Digital Songs and Alternative Digital Songs component charts at 10 and 11, respectively, for the same week. "Good Girls" entered the Billboard Adult Alternative Songs airplay chart at number 24 on the chart dated August 13 and reached a peak position of 21 two weeks later.

== Music video ==
The accompanying music video for "Good Girls" was directed by Dano Cerny and premiered July 13, 2016. It takes place first in a haunted laundromat and later in a dive bar, where King can be seen playing pool, smoking a cigar, and arm wrestling. King dyed her hair blue for the video, with the makeup artist responsible for the clip, Michelle Clark, describing the goal of the visual styling as "badass". Tying in the film concept, King's character dispatches a handful of ghosts with the franchise's signature proton gun. Towards the end of the video, clips of the film are showcased.

== Performances and promotion ==
King appeared on the July 15, 2016 episode of Good Morning America to promote the single and the Ghostbusters film, and performed "Good Girls" live.

== Charts ==
Chart (2016)	Peak position
Finland Airplay (Radiosoittolista)	81
US Hot Rock & Alternative Songs (Billboard)	29

== Release history ==
Country	Date	Format	Label	Ref.
Various	June 3, 2016	Digital download	RCA	
United States	June 13, 2016	Adult album alternative	RCA	
