= Girls Talk Boys =

Single by 5 Seconds of Summer

from the album Ghostbusters: Original Motion Picture Soundtrack
- Released: 15 July 2016
- Recorded: 2016
- Genre: Funk rock
- Length: 3:36
- Label: Capitol; Hi or Hey; RCA
- Songwriters: Eric Frederic; Teddy Geiger; John Ryan; Ammar Malik
- Producer: Ricky Reed

5 Seconds of Summer singles chronology
"Jet Black Heart" (2015)	"Girls Talk Boys" (2016)	"Want You Back" (2018)

Music video
- "Girls Talk Boys" on YouTube

"Girls Talk Boys" is a song by Australian pop rock band 5 Seconds of Summer, taken from the soundtrack of Ghostbusters: Answer the Call (2016). The song was written by John Ryan, Teddy Geiger, Ammar Malik, along with Ricky Reed, who also handled the song's production. "Girls Talk Boys" was released on 15 July 2016 and has charted in multiple countries, reaching a peak of 21 in Australia, 6 in Scotland, and 28 in the United Kingdom.

== Composition ==
The song is written in the key of E minor with a common time tempo of 120 beats per minute. The vocals span from D_{4} to D_{6} in the song.

== Music video ==
The official music video was released on 22 July 2016 and featured scenes from the Ghostbusters film. The video featured the band members in makeshift versions of costumes from the film. A spare car and props that resemble elements from the film were also used in the music video. As of May 2021, the music video has over 22 million views.

== Track listing ==
- Digital download
1. "Girls Talk Boys" – 3:36
- Digital download
1. "Girls Talk Boys" (Stafford Brothers remix) – 4:07

== Personnel ==
- Luke Hemmings – vocals
- Michael Clifford – vocals, guitar
- Calum Hood – vocals, bass
- Ashton Irwin – drums, vocals
- Ricky Reed – production, bass, guitar, programming
- John Ryan – vocals, bass
- Teddy Geiger – additional vocals
- Ammar Malik – additional vocals
- Ethan Shumaker – engineer
- Mark Winterburn - engineer
- John Delf – engineer
- Manny Marroquin – mixing
- Chris Galland – assistant mixing engineer
- Ike Schultz – assistant mixing engineer
- Chris Gehringer – mastering

== Charts ==
Weekly chart performance
Chart (2016)	Peak position
Australia (ARIA)	21
Austria (Ö3 Austria Top 40)	36
Belgium (Ultratip Bubbling Under Flanders)	34
Canada Hot 100 (Billboard)	87
Czech Republic Singles Digital (ČNS IFPI)	62
Finland Airplay (Radiosoittolista)	69
Finland Download (Latauslista)	3
France (SNEP)	35
Germany (GfK)	80
Hungary (Single Top 40)	13
Ireland (IRMA)	39
Israel International Airplay (Media Forest)	4
Italy (FIMI)	54
Japan Hot 100 (Billboard)	47
Mexico Airplay (Billboard)	45
Netherlands (Single Top 100)	81
New Zealand Heatseekers (Recorded Music NZ)	1
Portugal (AFP)	50
Scotland Singles (OCC)	6
Singapore (RIAS)	25
Slovakia Airplay (ČNS IFPI)	93
Slovakia Singles Digital (ČNS IFPI)	37
Spain (Promusicae)	23
Sweden Heatseeker (Sverigetopplistan)	2
Switzerland (Schweizer Hitparade)	68
UK Singles (OCC)	28
US Billboard Hot 100	68

== Certifications ==
Certifications and sales
Region	Certification	Certified units/sales
Australia (ARIA)	Gold	35,000^{‡}
^{‡} Sales+streaming figures based on certification alone.

== Release history ==
Region	Date	Format	Label
Worldwide	15 July 2016	Digital download	Capitol; Hi or Hey; RCA
