= Ghostbusters (1984 soundtrack) =

1984 film soundtrack

Ghostbusters: Original Soundtrack Album is the soundtrack album for the 1984 film of the same name, released by Arista Records on June 8, 1984. The soundtrack includes the Billboard Hot 100 number one hit "Ghostbusters", written and performed by Ray Parker Jr. The film score, Ghostbusters: Original Motion Picture Score, was composed and conducted by Elmer Bernstein, and performed by the Hollywood Studio Symphony. The film score remained unreleased until March 16, 2006, when it was released by Varèse Sarabande.

== Ghostbusters: Original Soundtrack Album ==
Ghostbusters: Original Soundtrack Album

Soundtrack album by various artists
- Released: June 8, 1984
- Genres: New wave, pop rock, R&B
- Length: 37:52
- Label: Arista

Singles from Ghostbusters: Original Soundtrack Album
- 1. "Ghostbusters" Released: June 8, 1984; 2. "I Can Wait Forever" Released: 1984; 3. "Cleanin' Up The Town" Released: 1984

=== Development ===
Early on, Ghostbusters director Ivan Reitman and Elmer Bernstein discussed the idea that the film would feature popular music at specific points to complement Bernstein's original score. This included "Magic" by Mick Smiley, which plays during the scene when the ghosts are released from the Ghostbusters headquarters. Bernstein's main theme for the Ghostbusters was later replaced by Ray Parker Jr.'s "Ghostbusters". Bernstein personally disliked the use of these songs, particularly "Magic", but said, "it's very hard to argue with something like ["Ghostbusters"], when it is up in the top ten on the charts". The soundtrack also includes two tracks from Elmer Bernstein's score for the film.

Music was required for a montage in the middle of the film, and "I Want a New Drug" by Huey Lewis and the News was used as a temporary placeholder because of its appropriate tempo. Reitman was later introduced to Parker Jr. who developed "Ghostbusters" with a similar riff to match the montage. There were approximately 50 to 60 different theme songs developed for Ghostbusters by different artists before Parker Jr.'s involvement, though none was deemed suitable. Huey Lewis was approached to compose the film's theme, but was already committed to work on Back to the Future's soundtrack.

=== Track listing ===
No.	Title	Writer(s)	Performer	Length
1.	"Ghostbusters"	Ray Parker Jr.	Ray Parker Jr.	4:05
2.	"Cleanin' Up The Town"	Brian O'Neal; Kevin O'Neal	The BusBoys	2:57
3.	"Savin' the Day"	Bobby Alessi; Dave Immer	Alessi Brothers	3:22
4.	"In the Name of Love"	Tom Bailey	Thompson Twins	3:18
5.	"I Can Wait Forever"	Graham Russell; David Foster; Jay Graydon	Air Supply	5:08
6.	"Hot Night"	Diane Warren; The Doctor (Steven Angelica)	Laura Branigan	3:21
7.	"Magic"	Mick Smiley	Mick Smiley	4:19
8.	"Main Title Theme (Ghostbusters)"	Elmer Bernstein	Elmer Bernstein	2:59
9.	"Dana's Theme"	Bernstein	Elmer Bernstein	3:31
10.	"Ghostbusters" (instrumental version)	Parker	Ray Parker Jr.	4:47
Total length:				37:52

=== Charts ===
Chart (1984–85)	Peak position
Argentine Albums (CAPIF)	1
Canada Top Albums/CDs (RPM)	6
Japanese Albums (Oricon)	3
New Zealand Albums (RMNZ)	18
Norwegian Albums (VG-lista)	15
Spanish Albums (AFYVE)	4
Swedish Albums (Sverigetopplistan)	13
Swiss Albums (Schweizer Hitparade)	16
UK Albums (OCC)	24
US Billboard 200	6

=== Certifications ===
Region	Certification	Certified units/sales
Canada (Music Canada)	Platinum	100,000^{^}
France (SNEP)	Gold	100,000
Spain (Promusicae)	Gold	50,000^{^}
United Kingdom (BPI)	Gold	100,000^{^}
United States (RIAA)	Platinum	1,000,000^{^}
^{^} Shipments figures based on certification alone.

== Ghostbusters: Original Motion Picture Score ==
Ghostbusters: Original Motion Picture Score

Film score by Elmer Bernstein
- Released: March 16, 2006
- Recorded: 1984
- Studios: The Village, West Los Angeles, California
- Genre: Film score
- Length: 60:00
- Labels: Varese Sarabande; Sony Classical
- Producer: Elmer Bernstein

=== Development ===
The Ghostbusters score was composed and conducted by Elmer Bernstein, and performed by the Hollywood Studio Symphony at The Village in West Los Angeles, California. It was orchestrated by Bernstein's son, Peter and David Spear. Bernstein had previously scored several of Ivan Reitman's films and was hired before filming had begun or all the cast had been signed. Reitman wanted a grounded, realistic score and did not want the music to tell the audience when something was funny. Bernstein used the ondes Martenot (effectively a keyboard equivalent of a theremin) to produce the "eerie" effect. Bernstein had to bring a musician, Cynthia Millar, from England to play the instrument because there were so few trained ondists. He also used three Yamaha DX7 synthesizers.

In a 1985 interview Bernstein described Ghostbusters as the most difficult score he had written, finding it challenging to balance the film's varying comedic and serious tones. He created an "antic" theme for the Ghostbusters he described as "cute, without being really way out". He found the latter parts of the film easier to score, aiming to make it sound "awesome and mystical".

=== Track listing ===
All tracks are written by Elmer Bernstein.

No.	Title	Length
1.	"Ghostbusters Theme"	3:01
2.	"Library"	2:22
3.	"Venkman"	0:33
4.	"Hello"	1:36
5.	"The Best One in Your Row"	1:07
6.	"Get Her!"	2:03
7.	"Plan"	1:26
8.	"Dana's Theme"	3:31
9.	"Fridge and Sign"	1:57
10.	"Attack"	1:32
11.	"Client"	0:35
12.	"Dana's Apartment"	1:40
13.	"Same Problem"	1:08
14.	"We Got One"	2:03
15.	"Zuul Part 1"	0:46
16.	"Meeting 1"	3:02
17.	"I Respect You"	0:57
18.	"Who Brought the Dog"	0:59
19.	"Zuul Part 2"	4:13
20.	"Steel Drum"	1:29
21.	"Cross Rip"	2:16
22.	"News"	1:44
23.	"Judgement Day"	1:19
24.	"Mistake"	0:39
25.	"Halls"	2:30
26.	"Ballroom"	1:03
27.	"Trap"	0:55
28.	"Meeting 2"	1:14
29.	"Earthquake"	0:34
30.	"Stairwell"	1:21
31.	"Gozer"	2:51
32.	"Let's Go"	1:15
33.	"We're Going to Save the World"	1:27
34.	"Mr. Stay Puft"	0:34
35.	"Final Battle"	1:33
36.	"Finish"	2:15
37.	"Zuul" (album version)	3:14
Total length:		60:00

== See also ==
- Ghostbusters II (soundtrack)
- Ghostbusters (2016 soundtrack)
- Ghostbusters: Afterlife (soundtrack)
- Ghostbusters: Frozen Empire (soundtrack)
