= Ghostbusters II =

1989 film by Ivan Reitman

- Theatrical release poster
- Directed by: Ivan Reitman
- Written by: Harold Ramis; Dan Aykroyd
- Based on: Characters by: Dan Aykroyd; Harold Ramis
- Produced by: Ivan Reitman
- Starring: Bill Murray; Dan Aykroyd; Sigourney Weaver; Harold Ramis; Rick Moranis; Ernie Hudson; Annie Potts
- Cinematography: Michael Chapman
- Edited by: Donn Cambern; Sheldon Kahn
- Music by: Randy Edelman
- Production company: Columbia Pictures
- Distributed by: Columbia Pictures
- Release date: June 16, 1989
- Running time: 108 minutes
- Country: United States
- Language: English
- Budget: $30–40 million
- Box office: $215.4 million

Ghostbusters II is a 1989 American supernatural comedy film directed by Ivan Reitman and written by Dan Aykroyd and Harold Ramis. The film stars Bill Murray, Aykroyd, Sigourney Weaver, Ramis, Rick Moranis, Ernie Hudson, and Annie Potts. It is the sequel to the 1984 film Ghostbusters and the second film in the Ghostbusters franchise. Set five years after the events of the first film, the Ghostbusters have been sued and put out of business after the destruction caused during their battle with the deity Gozer the Gozerian. When a new paranormal threat emerges, the Ghostbusters reunite to combat it and save the world.

After the success of Ghostbusters, Columbia Pictures wanted a sequel but struggled to overcome objections from the cast and crew. As with the first film, Aykroyd and Ramis collaborated on the script, which went through many variations. The pair wanted to convey a message about the consequences of negative human emotions in large cities. They settled on the idea of negative feelings creating a mass of supernatural slime beneath New York City that empowers malevolent spirits. With a budget of $30–40 million, filming took place between November 1988 and March 1989 in New York City and Los Angeles. Production was rushed and large sections of the film were scrapped after poorly received test screenings. New scenes were written and filmed during re-shoots between March and April 1989, only two months before its release.

Ghostbusters II was released on June 16, 1989, to generally negative reviews. Critics responded unfavorably to what they perceived as largely a copy of the original and a softening of its cynical, dark humor to be more family-friendly, although the performances of Peter MacNicol and Rick Moranis were repeatedly singled out for praise. As the sequel to the then-highest-grossing comedy film of all time, Ghostbusters II was expected to dominate the box office. Instead, the film earned $215.4 million during its theatrical run compared with the original's $282.2 million, making it the eighth-highest-grossing film of the year. Columbia Pictures deemed it a failure, effectively dissuading Murray from participating in a third Ghostbusters film. Its soundtrack single, "On Our Own" by Bobby Brown, was a success, spending 20 weeks on the United States music charts.

Ghostbusters II failed to replicate the cultural impact and following of the first film and was seen as responsible for stalling the franchise for decades, though its reception has improved retrospectively. The film spawned a series of merchandise including video games, board games, comic books, music, toys, and haunted houses. Despite the film's relative failure, a third installment was pursued through to the early 2010s. A reboot was released in 2016 to mixed reviews and financial underperformance. The series returned to the original canon with Ghostbusters: Afterlife (2021) and Ghostbusters: Frozen Empire (2024).

== Plot ==
Five years after saving New York City from destruction by the shapeshifting god Gozer, (Note: As depicted in Ghostbusters (1984).) the Ghostbusters have been sued for the property damage incurred and barred from investigating the supernatural, forcing them out of business. Ray Stantz now owns an occult bookstore and works a side job alongside Winston Zeddemore as unpopular children's entertainers; Egon Spengler works in a laboratory experimenting with human emotions; and Peter Venkman hosts a television talk show about psychics.

Dana Barrett, Peter's ex-girlfriend, has an infant son named Oscar with her ex-husband and works at an art museum restoring artwork. She contacts the Ghostbusters after Oscar's baby stroller rolls, seemingly independently, into a busy intersection. At the museum, a painting of Vigo the Carpathian, a 16th-century European tyrant and powerful magician, comes to life and enslaves Dana's boss, Janosz Poha. Vigo orders Janosz to bring him a child to possess, allowing him to escape the confines of his painting and live again to conquer the world. Because of his infatuation with Dana, Janosz chooses Oscar.

Meanwhile, the Ghostbusters excavate the intersection where Oscar's stroller stopped and discover a river of slime running through the abandoned Beach Pneumatic Transit system. Ray obtains a sample but is attacked by the slime and accidentally breaks a pipe that falls onto a power line, causing a citywide blackout. The Ghostbusters are arrested and taken to court for the damage and for investigating the supernatural. Upon presentation as evidence, the slime sample responds physically to the judge's tirade against the Ghostbusters and then explodes, manifesting the ghosts of the Scoleri brothers, whom he had sentenced to death. The Ghostbusters capture the ghosts in exchange for a dismissal of the charges and the right to resume their business.

One night, the slime invades Dana's apartment, attacking her and Oscar. She seeks refuge with Peter, and they rekindle their relationship. The Ghostbusters discover the slime reacts to emotions and suspect it has accumulated from the negative emotions of New Yorkers. Determining Vigo and the slime are connected, Egon, Ray, and Winston investigate the river of slime, but they are pulled in. They emerge at the museum and begin fighting each other until Egon realizes the slime's negative energy is influencing them. The Ghostbusters tell the mayor of their discoveries but are dismissed; his assistant Jack Hardemeyer has them committed to a psychiatric hospital to protect the mayor's political interests. A spirit appearing as Janosz kidnaps Oscar, and Dana pursues them into the museum, which is then covered with impenetrable slime.

On New Year's Eve, the slime rises to the streets, causing widespread supernatural chaos. Discovering Hardemeyer's actions, the enraged mayor fires him and has the Ghostbusters released. Determining that a positive symbol will rally the citizens and weaken the slime, the Ghostbusters use slime charged with positive emotions to animate and pilot the Statue of Liberty through the streets filled with cheering citizens. At the museum, the slime barrier partially recedes due to the positive emotions. The Ghostbusters use the Statue's torch to break through the ceiling, stopping Vigo from possessing Oscar, then rappel through the ceiling and neutralize Janosz with positive slime. Vigo takes on a physical form, immobilizes Dana and the Ghostbusters, and recaptures Oscar. The gathered crowds outside begin singing a chorus of "Auld Lang Syne", and their positivity weakens Vigo, sending him back to the painting and freeing the Ghostbusters. Vigo possesses Ray, but the Ghostbusters use their weapons to free him and defeat Vigo, his painting being replaced by one depicting their likenesses surrounding Oscar. Afterwards, the city lauds the Ghostbusters and the Statue of Liberty is returned to Liberty Island.

== Cast ==
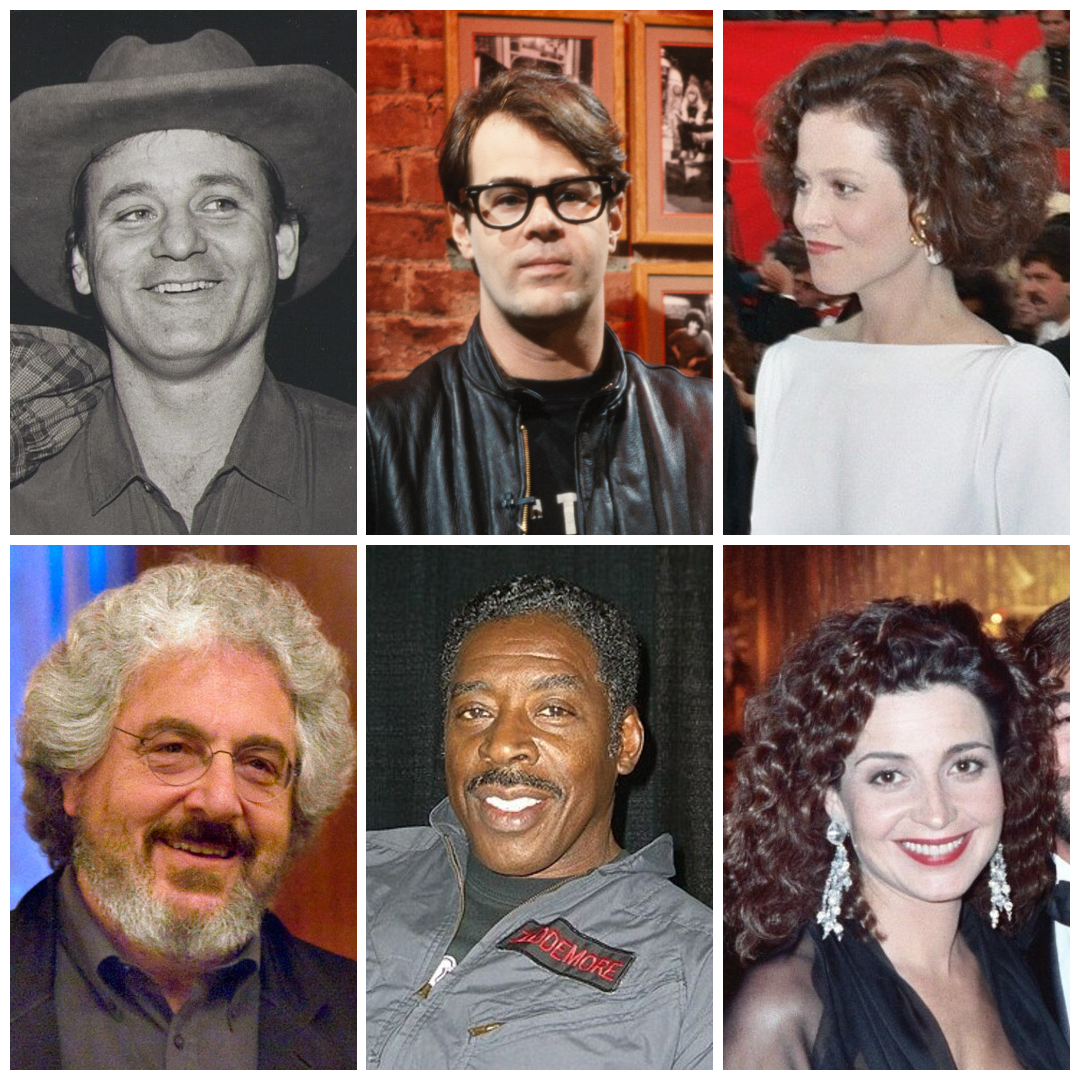
Stars of the film include (l-r) Bill Murray (pictured in 1989), Dan Aykroyd (1982), Sigourney Weaver (1989), Harold Ramis, Ernie Hudson (both 2009), and Annie Potts (1989)

- Bill Murray as Peter Venkman
- Dan Aykroyd as Raymond Stantz
- Sigourney Weaver as Dana Barrett
- Harold Ramis as Egon Spengler
- Rick Moranis as Louis Tully
- Ernie Hudson as Winston Zeddemore
- Annie Potts as Janine Melnitz
- Peter MacNicol as Janosz Poha
- Kurt Fuller as Jack Hardemeyer
- David Margulies as Mayor Lenny Clotch
- Harris Yulin as Judge Stephen Wexler
- Janet Margolin as The Prosecutor
- William T. Deutschendorf and Hank J. Deutschendorf II as Baby Oscar

As well as the main cast, Ghostbusters II features Wilhelm von Homburg as Vigo the Carpathian (voiced by Max von Sydow). Several relatives of the cast and crew appear in the film; Murray's brother Brian Doyle-Murray plays the Ghostbusters' psychiatric doctor, Aykroyd's niece Karen Humber portrays a schoolchild, and director Ivan Reitman's children Jason and Catherine portray, respectively, the rude child at the opening birthday party and a girl that is part of Egon's experiments. Reitman cameos as a pedestrian. Judy Ovitz, wife of talent agent Michael Ovitz, who represented many of the principal cast, appears as a woman in a restaurant who is slimed.

Mary Ellen Trainor appears as the host of a children's party, Cheech Marin plays a dock supervisor, and Philip Baker Hall portrays the city police chief. Bobby Brown (credited as Bobby Baresford Brown), who contributed to the film's soundtrack, cameos as a doorman. Ben Stein plays a public works official for the mayor, and Louise Troy appears as a woman wearing a possessed mink fur coat. Kevin Dunn and Chloe Webb appear as, respectively, Milton Angland and Elaine, guests on Venkman's television show.

== Production ==
=== Development ===
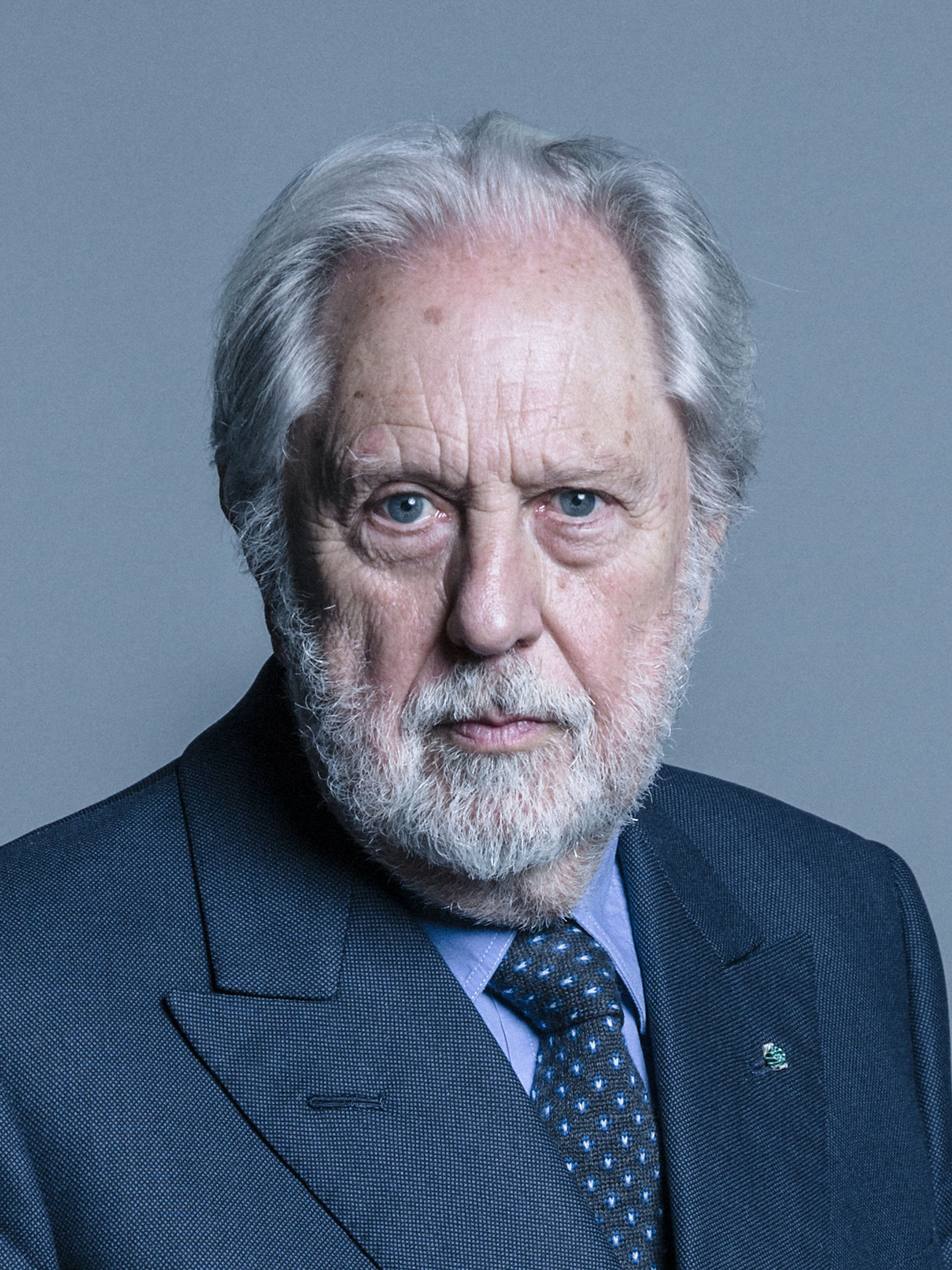
Then-Columbia Pictures executive David Puttnam (2018) was blamed for Ghostbusters II's lengthy production, though director Ivan Reitman said it was more the fault of the reluctant cast and crew.

After the success of Ghostbusters, a sequel was considered inevitable even though the film had been developed as a stand-alone project. The development of Ghostbusters II was arduous, and the behind-the-scenes conflicts were given as much coverage in the press as the film. When David Puttnam became chairman of Columbia Pictures in June 1986, he was not interested in developing an expensive sequel, and favored smaller films such as the critically acclaimed war film Hope and Glory (1987) and the comedy film Bloodhounds of Broadway (1989) over big-budget blockbusters. He also greenlit several foreign-language films by European directors because he preferred making films for the "world market". Ghostbusters was part of former Columbia executive Frank Price's legacy, and Puttnam had no interest in furthering that legacy while building his own.

Reitman later said the delay in development was not Puttnam's fault; he said that executives above Puttnam at Columbia's New York branch had attempted to work around him, but could not get the production moving even after sidelining him. According to Reitman, the delay occurred because the main actors did not want to make a sequel for nearly three years; by the time they decided to go ahead, Murray was committed to his starring role in the Christmas comedy film Scrooged (1988). When Murray was finally ready, the script was not. As co-creators, Reitman, Murray, Aykroyd, and Ramis all had control over the franchise, and their unanimous approval was required to proceed.

In April 1987, Puttnam announced that Ghostbusters II would go into production in November that year without having informed Reitman, who had not yet reviewed the unfinished script. Puttnam was removed from his job in September. This was in part because he had alienated Murray and his talent agent Michael Ovitz. Puttnam had publicly criticized Murray as "an actor who makes millions of dollars from Hollywood without giving back to his art. He's a taker". He also attacked expensive talent agency packages that provided scripts, directors, and stars; Ovitz also represented Aykroyd, Ramis, and Reitman.

Puttnam was replaced as Columbia president by Dawn Steel. When she took the job, her corporate bosses made it clear that getting the sequel into production was a priority. Columbia had experienced a long series of box-office failures since Ghostbusters, and Ghostbusters II was seen as the best way to reverse their fortunes. By November, filming was scheduled to begin in summer the following year. At the time, Murray reportedly wanted $10 million to star in the sequel and his co-stars demanded an equal amount.

The main obstacle was the disputes between the principal cast and crew that had arisen since Ghostbusters. Ramis later said "there was a little air to clear" before they could work together. In March 1988, Ovitz arranged a private lunch for himself, Murray, Aykroyd, Ramis, Reitman, and Ovitz's colleague, CAA head of business affairs Ray Kurtzman, at Jimmy's, a celebrity restaurant in Beverly Hills, California. Concerns were raised such as whether the principals could still carry the sequel because Murray had been away from films for so long and Aykroyd had had a series of film failures. During the meeting, the group had fun and decided they could work together.

Months of negotiations followed with Reitman, Murray, Aykroyd, and Ramis to negotiate a minimal salary in exchange for a percentage of the box office profits. The deal was reported to be 10% of the box office profits each; Reitman denied that the figure was that large but said, "it's a big one". This was to keep the budget low, aiming for approximately $30 million, whereas upfront salaries would have raised it closer to $50 million. After this, the film was rushed into production, with shooting scheduled for mid-1988 in anticipation of a mid-1989 release. Despite the five years it took to produce a sequel and its necessity for special effects, Ghostbusters II had a shorter schedule than its predecessor's one-year turnaround. Michael C. Gross and producer Joe Medjuck returned for the sequel, each promoted to producer. Michael Chapman replaced László Kovács as cinematographer, and Bo Welch replaced John DeCuir as production designer.

=== Writing ===
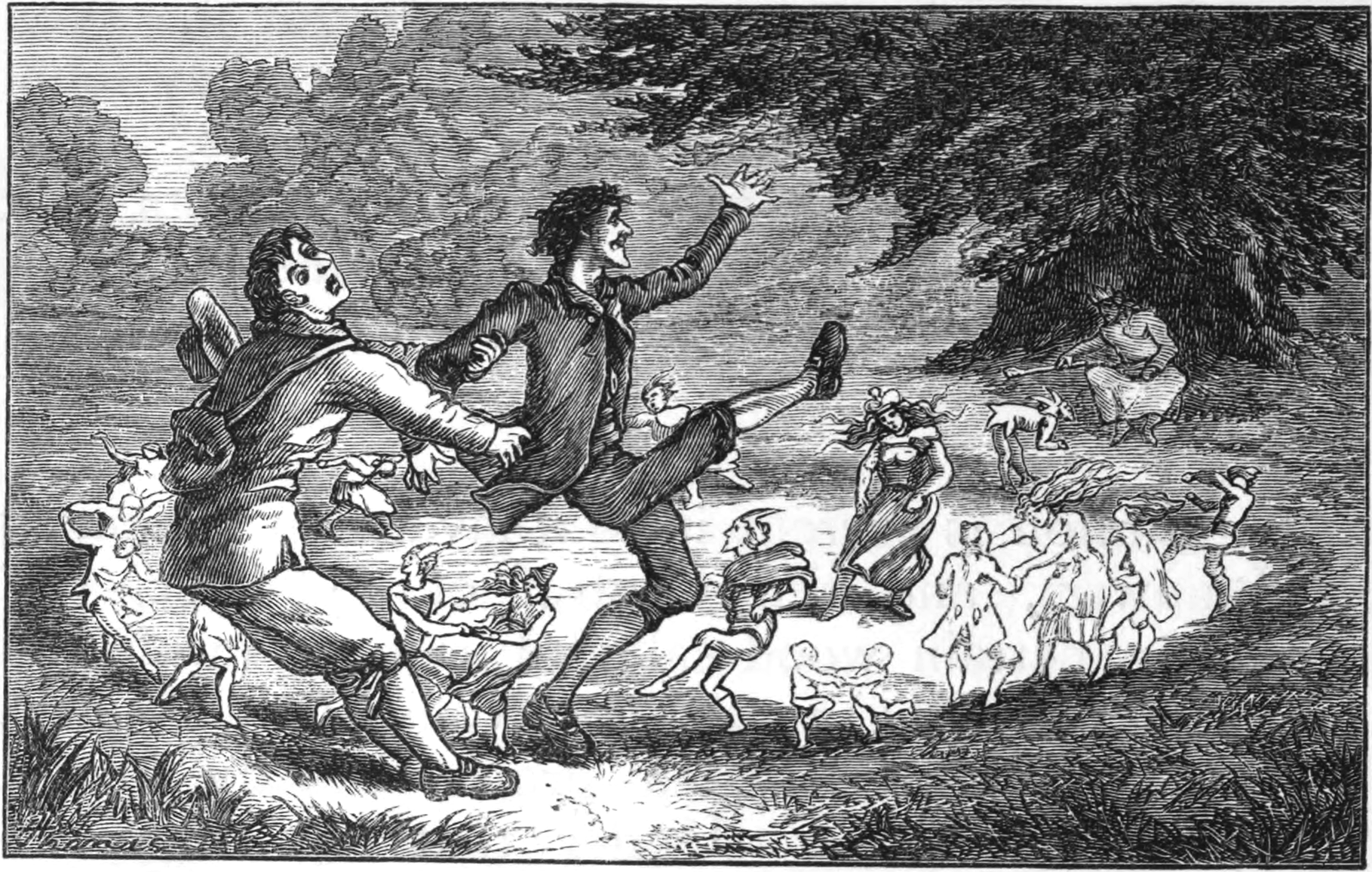
Folklore about the existence of fairy rings—naturally occurring rings or arcs of mushrooms—and their ties to the supernatural were present in Aykroyd's early draft.

Aykroyd described his first draft as "really too far out... too inaccessible". He wanted to avoid using New York City, set the film overseas, and provide a contrast to the first film's climax atop a skyscraper by including a subterranean threat. This draft followed Dana Barrett, who is kidnapped and taken to Scotland, where she discovers a fairy ring—a naturally occurring ring or arc of mushrooms sometimes linked in folklore to fairies or witches—and an underground civilization. The Ghostbusters would have had to travel through an underground pneumatic tube over 2,000 miles long that would have taken three days to traverse. He eventually decided that retaining the New York setting would allow for continuity and would better fit the story he wanted to tell while allowing them to explore underground.

As with Ghostbusters, Aykroyd partnered with Ramis to refine the script. Early on, they decided Ghostbusters II should reflect the five-year passage of time between the two films. Ramis suggested the story focus on a baby because he had previously developed a horror film concept centered on an infant who possessed adult agility and focus. This inspired him to create the character Oscar. Initially, the child was the son of Peter Venkman and Dana, who would have maintained their relationship in the intervening years. The child would have become possessed as a focal point of the film; Murray felt this created an imbalance in the story, placing too much emphasis on his and Dana's relationship with the child rather than the Ghostbusters and their character dynamics. Instead, they chose to have Peter's and Dana's relationship fail, allowing her to marry, have a child and be divorced by the events of Ghostbusters II. Ramis wanted to show that the Ghostbusters had not remained heroes after their victory in the previous film; he felt that would have been a less original approach.

The river of slime was conceived early in their collaboration. Ramis wanted the slime beneath New York to present a moral issue caused by the buildup of negative human emotions in large cities; he considered it a metaphor for urban decay and a call to deliver a human solution, though he said this was buried deeply in the script. The pair wanted negative emotions to have consequences and found humor in New York City having to be nice or face destruction, though at this point they did not know what form that destruction would take. Ramis said: "Comedically, it suggested, what if everyone in New York City had to be nice for forty-eight hours?" Aykroyd said they wanted to show negativity has to go somewhere, potentially into the person the emotion is directed towards. He felt this made the film more grounded compared with dealings with gods. He said: "Cities everywhere are dangerous. Life has become cheap. You can go to ... see a movie and get machine-gunned on the street". The story evolved far from Ramis' and Aykroyd's efforts but retained the core notion of emotions and their impact. By May 1987, Aykroyd and Ramis had been working for over a year, and had completed the screenplay by March 1988.

In the years since the release of the more adult-oriented Ghostbusters, its animated spin-off television series The Real Ghostbusters had become popular with its target child audience. The team was tasked with balancing the needs of Ghostbusters fans and those of the cartoon's audience. According to Medjuck, the cartoon's success was influential in the return of Slimer for the sequel, and they aimed to avoid contradicting the cartoon where possible; he said although the Ghostbusters have been out of work for five years, they had to act as though the cartoon's events took place after the film.

=== Casting ===
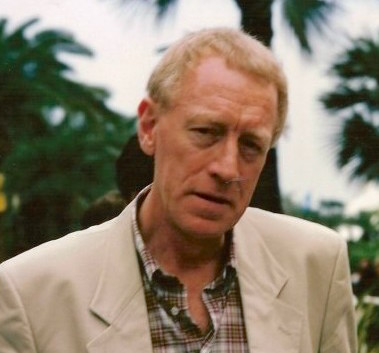
Max von Sydow (1990) provided the voice of Vigo the Carpathian.

According to early reports, Puttnam intended to replace the principal cast with lower-salaried actors, in part because of his disdain for Murray. Puttnam denied this in a 1987 interview and said recasting had never been an option.

Ghostbusters II was to be the first sequel Reitman had directed, and he was worried about being able to surprise the audience without relying on elaborate special effects. He wanted to focus on character interaction, believing that was the original film's main draw. Ramis was apprehensive about returning to the franchise because of the overwhelming success of Ghostbusters. Murray was also hesitant; he had left acting for four years following the release of the previous film. He described Ghostbusters' success as a phenomenon that would forever be his biggest accomplishment and felt "radioactive" after the failure of his personal project The Razor's Edge (1984). He chose to avoid making films until he returned for Scrooged. Murray was also dismissive of sequels in general, believing they exist only for "greed" or "business" reasons, the latter of which he said should carry a death sentence. He said he returned for the sequel because "working on the first Ghostbusters was the most fun any of us had".

The character of Janosz Poha, portrayed by Peter MacNicol, was originally called Jason and serves as a straight man to the Ghostbusters. MacNicol said the role could be played by anyone so he opted to give Poha a backstory in which he is Carpathian. He developed the accent from his Czech friend and from observations at a Romanian tourist agency. MacNicol wanted to wear a black Beatles wig but the idea was rejected because many of the cast had dark hair. The character's accent was inspired by that of Meryl Streep in the film Sophie's Choice (1982). In the script, Poha is not described as having an accent but MacNicol impressed Reitman with it at his audition.

Max von Sydow provided the voice of Vigo; he completed his recordings in a single day. Von Homburg reportedly only learned his voice had been dubbed with von Sydow's while watching the premiere and stormed out shortly afterward. He later said his slurred voice, which was caused by a split lip, had been a hindrance in securing acting work. Eugene Levy was cast as Louis' cousin Sherman, an employee at the psychiatric ward where the Ghostbusters are imprisoned. The character was instrumental in their liberation but his scenes were cut.

=== Filming ===
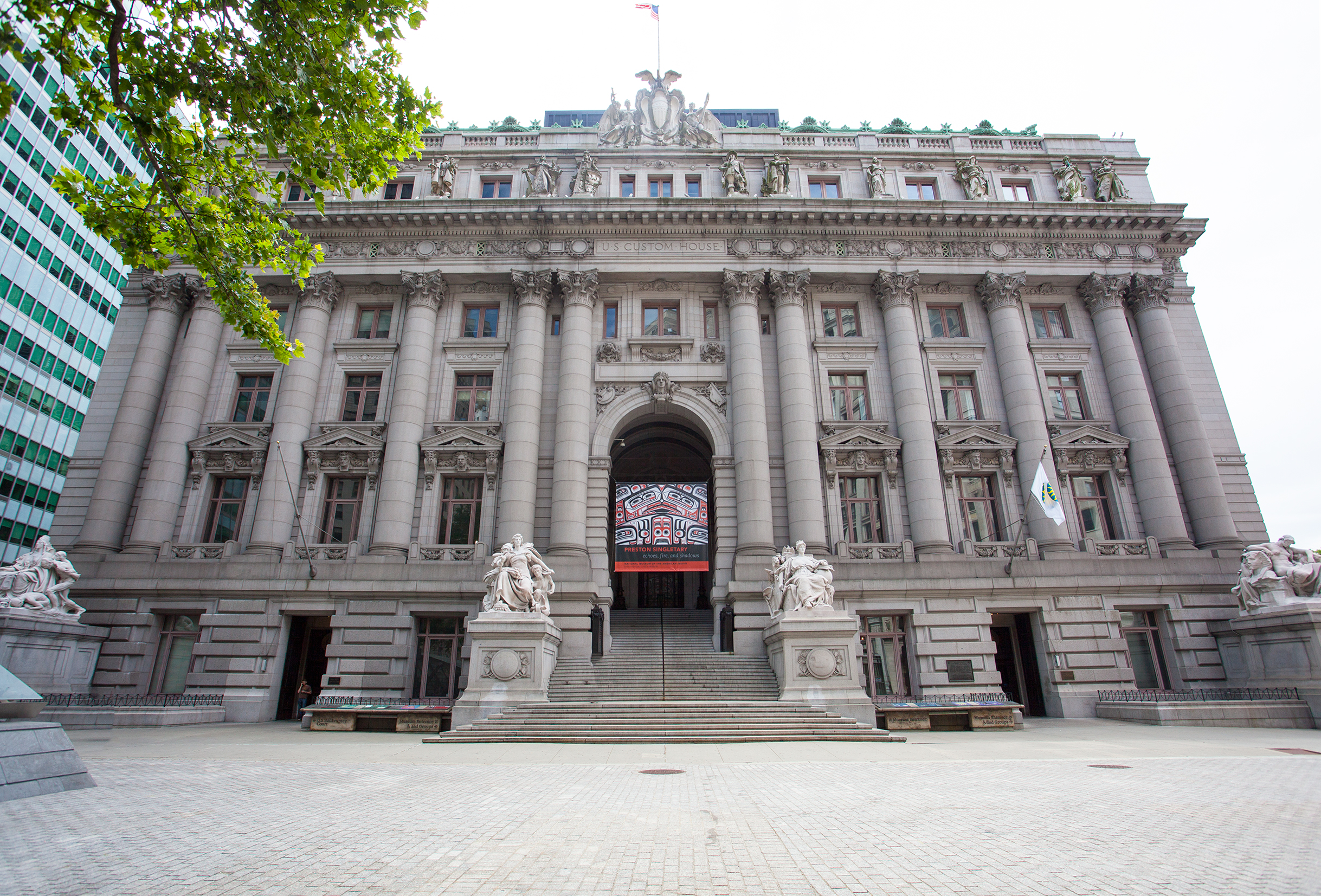
The Alexander Hamilton U.S. Custom House served as the exterior of the Manhattan Museum of Art.

Reitman began working on Ghostbusters II almost immediately after directing the 1988 comedy film Twins. Principal photography began in November 1988, in New York City. The budget was reported to be between $30 million and $40 million. (Note: The 1989 budget of $30–40 million is equivalent to $77.9 million–$104 million in 2025.) Filming in New York lasted approximately two weeks and consisted mostly of exterior shoots.

The city authorities were supportive of the project and even granted the crew permission to film on Manhattan's Second Avenue during a period in which access for forty city blocks was restricted because of the visit of Mikhail Gorbachev, leader of the Soviet Union. Other locations include the Statue of Liberty and Firehouse, Hook & Ladder Company 8, the latter of which again served as the exterior of the Ghostbusters' headquarters. The updated Ghostbusters' business logo, which was gifted to the firehouse staff after filming, was hung on the outside of the building but eventually fell off.

The Alexander Hamilton U.S. Custom House served as the exterior of the Manhattan Museum of Art, which housed the Vigo painting. The scene of Aykroyd, Ramis, and Hudson's characters emerging from a manhole covered in slime was filmed in front of the building. When he wrote the scene, Ramis expected the production to use a manhole, but the only available underground location was a telephone conduit. Space in the hole was limited, and the actors had to squeeze into it while covered in slime. Freezing temperatures combined with the liquid slime made the actors uncomfortable. The following day, they learned the cameras had been recording at the wrong speed and they would have to film the scene again. The scene of the Ghostbusters scanning the intersection where Oscar's possessed baby carriage is taken was filmed on First Avenue.

Filming had moved to Los Angeles by late December 1988. Fire Station No. 23 again served as the interior of the Ghostbusters' headquarters. Greystone Mansion in Beverly Hills was used for the scene in which the Ghostbusters visit the mayor at Gracie Mansion. The scene in which the Ghostbusters dig a hole to find the river of slime was filmed in downtown Los Angeles. The scene in which a fur coat comes to life and runs away was filmed on a Los Angeles street; it was written for the original film but was not used and repurposed for Ghostbusters II. Filming concluded on March 7, 1989. Medjuck noted that characters are often seen smoking in Ghostbusters but a societal change in the intervening years meant this was no longer acceptable; Ghostbusters II depicts fewer scenes including smoking.

=== Post-production ===
The Washington Square Arch was featured in reshoots as the site of a slime-powered ghost attack. Thousands of civilians attended the recording and were used in the film, shown running away from the arch.

Following test screenings, the principal crew realized there were numerous issues with the film. Reitman said that upon watching the test version he realized the final 25 minutes of the film "just died a horrible death", so he spent four days filming a new 25-minute ending to replace it. The test screenings identified that audiences liked the film but felt Vigo did not present a real challenge to the Ghostbusters and that their victory was too easy. Test audiences also thought Vigo, the slime, and the associated ghosts were not sufficiently connected. According to Gross, the audiences were not aware that the slime in the film could be charged by negative or positive emotions, so scenes were added to better explain this.

Extensive re-shoots were conducted throughout March and April 1989, only two months before the film's release; these included on-location filming in New York. Ghostbusters II had been scheduled for release on the July 4th Independence Day holiday weekend but Reitman felt June 23 would work better. When they learned the superhero film Batman was also being released that day, they asked to move to the 16th. According to Gross, "Joe Medjuck and I were turning pale ... it did not look possible ... It was a real killer".

Several new scenes were added to increase the sense of urgency and threat to the Ghostbusters, including the underground ghost train sequence and the associated severed-heads scare. A scene showing the Ghostbusters' developed photographs of Vigo bursting into flames, threatening to immolate them, was also added. Reitman wanted these scenes added because he thought his previous cut of the film focused too much on the relationship between Murray's and Weaver's characters. The ghost train scene was filmed at the Tunnel night club in New York. It was added to create a sense of an unseen force trying to keep the Ghostbusters away. Medjuck noted that the added scenes did not require extensive special effects. Cheech Marin's cameo as a dock supervisor was also added in this period.

The additional content replaced some scenes and subplots that were far into completion and contained finished special effects. Further shooting was done in Washington Square Park, which was used for the monster moving under the Washington Square Arch. The popularity of the film was evident at that time when thousands of people arrived after hearing Ghostbusters II was being filmed there. They took part in filming, screaming on cue and running to escape the monster. The film's final battle with Vigo was reshot, and the way that Vigo left the painting to confront the Ghostbusters changed completely.

One of the cut scenes included a subplot in which the Ray Stantz character is possessed by Vigo following his inspection of the Vigo painting. Ray erratically drives the Ectomobile until he is freed of Vigo's control by Winston. This explained Ray's possession in the finale. Some of this footage was repurposed into a montage. There were also scenes of Louis Tully attempting to capture Slimer, which test audiences found intrusive, and Slimer was reduced to two appearances. Gross said they retained some Slimer scenes for children but that audiences generally had no reaction to the character, which was not what they had expected. Because the sequence in which Tully's cousin frees the Ghostbusters from the psychiatric hospital was removed, a scene showing a paranormal eclipse from the Mayor's office was added to explain the Mayor securing their release. Other removed scenes showed Ray and Egon experimenting with the slime, which explained how they learned to manipulate it to control the Statue of Liberty. A ghost was also removed from the sequence in which the slime causes ghosts to rise across New York because Reitman felt it was not creepy enough.

=== Music ===
Ray Parker Jr. helped develop an updated version of his hit song "Ghostbusters", which was co-written and performed by hip hop group Run-DMC. Aiming to replicate the success of the original soundtrack, producer Peter Afterman wanted to hire Bobby Brown who had a recent succession of hit songs. To secure Brown's involvement, Afterman offered Brown's music label, MCA Records, the rights to the Ghostbusters II soundtrack. Brown agreed in exchange for a role in the film. Filming had nearly concluded at that time, but Reitman wrote Brown a cameo as the mayor's doorman. The resulting song, "On Our Own", was written by L.A. Reid, Babyface, and Daryl Simmons. The music video features appearances by Iman, Jane Curtin, Doug E. Fresh, Christopher Reeve, Malcolm Forbes, Rick Moranis, Donald Trump, and Marky and Joey Ramone.

Brown also worked alone to write and produce "We're Back". Other songs on the soundtrack include "Flip City" by Glenn Frey, "Spirit" by Doug E. Fresh & The Get Fresh Crew, and "Love is a Cannibal" by Elton John. The song "Flesh 'n Blood" by composer Danny Elfman and Oingo Boingo was written for the film but Elfman said he was disappointed that only four musical bars of it were used. He thought the small usage was an excuse to be able to release it on the soundtrack and said if he had known he would have pulled the song.

Randy Edelman was responsible for the film's original score. It was one of Edelman's first experiences working with a large scale orchestra. Although familiar with Ghostbusters, he chose not to re-watch it for inspiration so the sequel would have a unique sound. Edelman believed the distinct personalities of the existing characters meant they rarely needed a musical accompaniment, and instead focused on scoring the supernatural and action setpieces to represent the menace and "dark nature of the evil Carpathian".

== Special effects and design ==
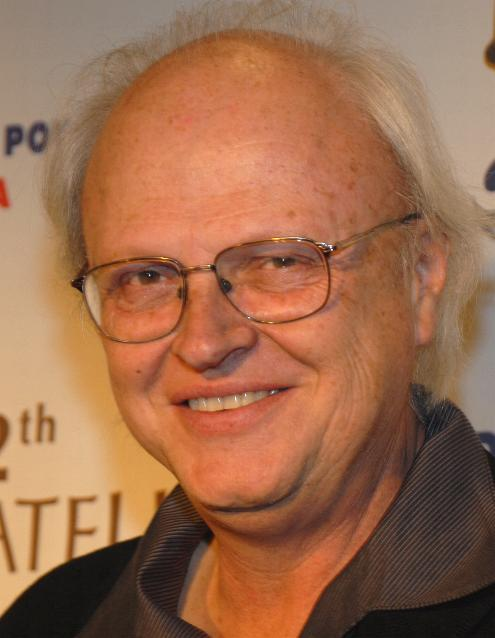
Dennis Muren served as the visual effects supervisor on Ghostbusters II.

As with his work on Ghostbusters, Reitman had little interest in the technical side of his film. For the sequel, he employed special effects studio Industrial Light & Magic (ILM), giving them a rough outline of the plot and the freedom to do as they wanted. Columbia had previously helped Richard Edlund found special effects company Boss Film Studios for Ghostbusters, but Reitman was reported to be unhappy with their work. Edlund's former ILM co-worker Dennis Muren served as the visual effects supervisor. Despite the film's intentionally rushed schedule, Muren wanted to work on the film because it would let him design new creatures. Muren admitted that his designs would not be as original as Ghostbusters', and instead wanted to make them more flexible and "ghostly". The team was originally hired to provide 110 effects shots but this grew to 180.

ILM was also working on special effects for other 1989 releases; Back to the Future Part II, Indiana Jones and the Last Crusade, and The Abyss, but had the most difficulty with Ghostbusters II because designs and concepts were constantly changing and new scenes were being added. ILM eventually refused to accept any further alterations. As the schedule tightened, ILM had nine teams working every day for four weeks to complete the expanded 180 shots, and had to outsource some of the extra work to Visual Concept Engineering, Available Light, Character Shop, and the uncredited Tippett Studio. Apogee Productions handled many of the effects for the reshoots.

=== Slime ===
Methocel, a vegetable-based gel, was used to create the slime. Food coloring was added; the colors included green (to match Slimer) and blue. Physical effects supervisor Chuck Gaspar mocked up differently colored batches, and Reitman settled on pink. The film required approximately 100,000 U.S. gallons (380,000 liters) of slime. Four cement mixers were kept on-site to mix fresh batches daily because it deteriorated quickly. Mica dust and mineral oil were added for the river of slime; the dust added depth to the river while the oil created varying shapes on its surface.

The river of slime in the Van Horne Pneumatic Transit station was a miniature model with a plexiglass trough 1 ft (0.30 m) wide and 10 ft (3.0 m) long. It operated in a gravity pump and was fed from a large tank 15 ft (4.6 m) above it. After reaching the end of the river, the slime fell into another tank, from which it was fed back to the upper tank. Air injectors and puppeteered baffles were used to create bubbles and manipulate the slime to flow as though something was moving beneath the surface. Small slime tentacles were created using vinyl-covered sticks operated from below. The large tentacle was plastic and was filmed against a blue screen as it fell away from a stand-in's boot. The footage was then played in reverse so the tentacle would appear to be grabbing at Aykroyd. The Van Horne scene combined the miniature river, matte paintings of the station, and a practical set for stairs leading to a tunnel. The scene in which Aykroyd, Ramis, and Hudson fall into the river was considered one of the most difficult effects to achieve; the actors were filmed falling from the Van Horne set, which was composited with the miniature river. Hudson's character being dragged away by the slime's current was filmed against a blue screen so he would appear in the river; his motion in the river had to be animated by hand against the river's natural movements.

=== Creature effects ===
The returning Slimer ghost was redeveloped to be more child-friendly like his popular The Real Ghostbusters incarnation. His face, which was controlled with wires and cables in Ghostbusters, was now controlled by servo motors and had a pneumatic jaw. Bobby Porter was hired to wear the Slimer costume until the character was removed from the film entirely. A few weeks later, Slimer was reinserted, but by this time, Porter was not available and was replaced by Robin Shelby.

The Scoleri Brother ghosts, Tony and Nunzio, were inspired by a pair of brothers who robbed Ramis' father's store. Creature designer Tim Lawrence was influenced by the musical comedy film The Blues Brothers (1980), which starred Aykroyd and featured two brothers, one of whom was tall and thin (Tony) and the other short and fat (Nunzio). The brothers were given a cartoonish design to counter the film's scary moments. Lawrence aimed to represent the characters' evil rather than their pre-death appearances. Camilla Henneman created most of Nunzio using spandex pouches filled with gelatinous materials to make him appear impossibly fat. The costume was worn by Lawrence. The impossibly thin Tony was designed as a life-size puppet but Muren thought this approach would impact the filming schedule. Tony was reworked as a costume that was worn by actor Jim Fye; it was given elongated appendages to appear unnaturally thin.

The ghosts' faces were articulated with motors and pneumatics created by mechanical animator Al Coulter and his team. Lawrence also developed an animation system to allow the masks to lip-sync dialog. Alongside early concepts of the ghosts walking and creating explosive ruptures with each step, most of these features were abandoned in the final film. Lawrence later said without those features the same effect could have been created with a one-third-scale puppet. The brothers' electric chairs were miniatures composited into footage of the seated, costumed actors. Distortion effects such as the ghosts being squeezed were created using completed effect shots that were rephotographed through mylar material that could be warped to affect the underlying image. For the scene in which Nunzio carries the prosecutor upside-down from the courtroom, a stuntwoman was hung upside down on a rail. Reitman wanted her to pass through the doorway while seeing above it. Gaspar's team created a passage made of foam above a door that resembled the iron grill. The foam was spring-loaded so that when the wire passed through, the set sprang back into place quickly; the effect was hidden behind a composite of Nunzio. Full-scale cutouts of the ghosts were used during filming to aid the actors. Ghostbusters storyboard artist Thom Enriquez storyboarded the scene; he found the process difficult because the limited schedule meant the courtroom was being built as he worked. He was also restricted by the budget, saying he "could use only fourteen chairs. I could also blow up four pillars and one wall of glass".

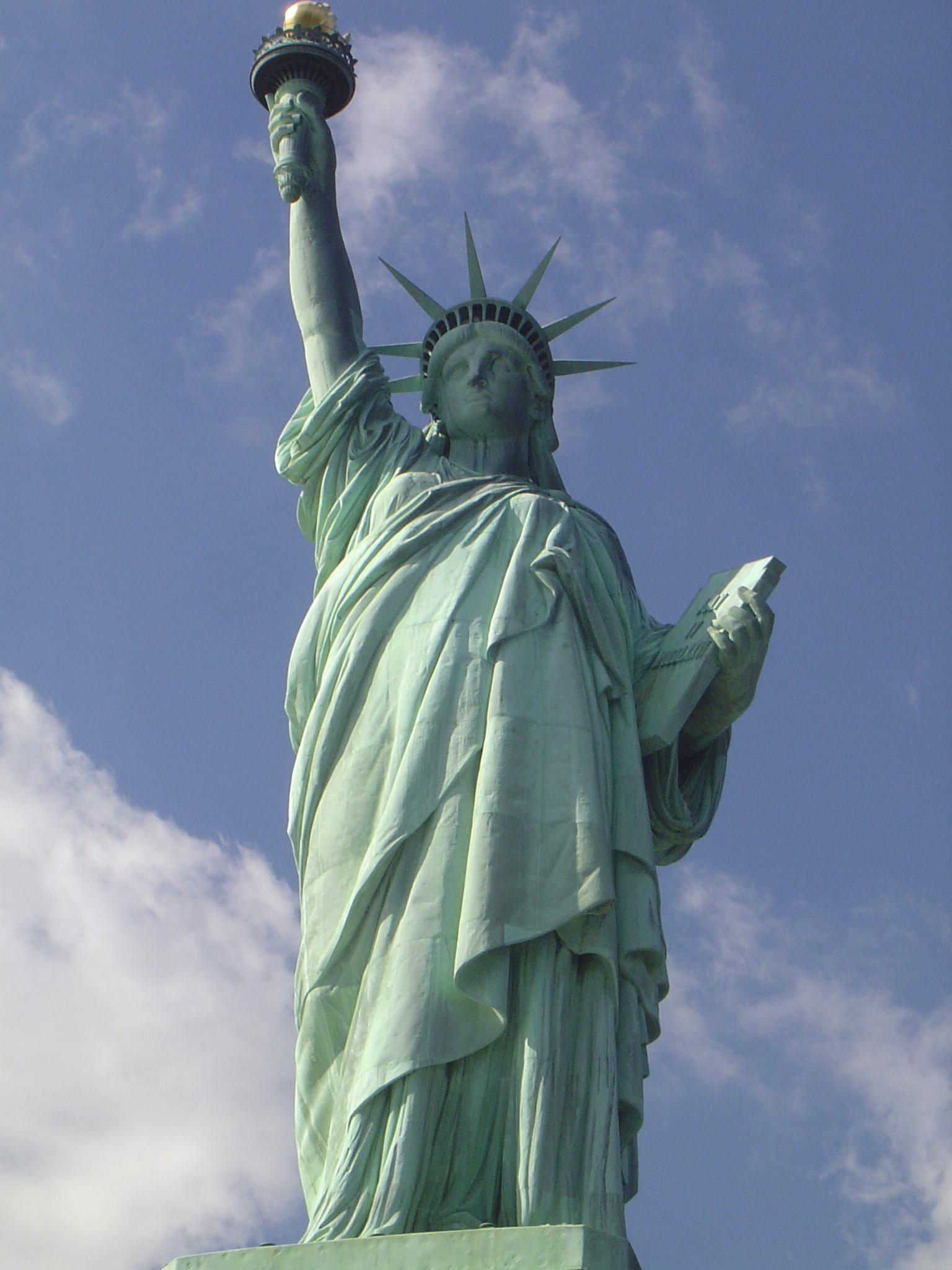
The Statue of Liberty was a prominent feature in the film's finale. Dan Aykroyd liked the idea of animating something otherwise immobile.

The animated Statue of Liberty was conceived by Aykroyd, who liked the idea of taking a static image and making it move about, comparing it with seeing the Eiffel Tower moving or Victoria Falls flowing in reverse. The statue's role was originally written as a weapon for Vigo but this idea did not progress the narrative. The effect was a combination of a costume worn by Fye, miniatures, and larger-than-life-size elements like the statue's crown— which in reality was too small to let the Ghostbusters peer out. The crown was mounted on a gimbal, allowing it to be pivoted as though its wearer was walking. Reitman ordered the crown be tilted down further than the actors were expecting to elicit from them a genuine reaction of surprise. The upper body was modeled and filmed at night in a makeshift pool to show it emerging from the ocean. Fye also portrayed the ghost of a Central Park jogger.

To portray the possessed Janosz illuminating a hallway with his eyes, MacNicol was filmed walking down a hallway, which was filmed again without lights and with Michael Chapman holding a light at the height of MacNicol's head, while panning it from side-to-side. Several takes were done to cover MacNicol's gaze. Animators added the beams emanating from Janosz, including particulate matter to enhance the realism. The "ghost nanny" version of Janosz that snatches Oscar from Venkman's apartment went through many variations. During development, it was conceived of as a two-headed dragon—an idea that was dismissed as unoriginal—billboard figures, animated gargoyles, a phantom taxi, and Santa Claus. A possessed item in the apartment was also considered; this idea inspired the possessed bathtub. MacNicol wore drag as the nanny for closeups and a puppet was used for wide shots. The ghost's extending arm was made from stretchable plastic tubing covered in fabric.

Welch built the exterior walls and ledge of Venkman's apartment to scale; it was positioned 10 ft (3.0 m) in the air. The ledge was superimposed over a matte painting of the full building. The infant actor was secured in a rig that helped him to stand up before his abduction. The possessed bathtub started as a bubble-bath monster that would appear to have thousands of eyes in each bubble; it is destroyed when Dana drops her hairdryer into the bath. Reitman preferred the slime to be the monster. A silicone bath that could be easily bent was used; from below, Tom Floutz puppeteered a tentacle made of dielectric gel and reinforced with spandex and china silk, which was covered in slime. A fiberglass maw was inserted in front of a vacuum tube that sucked the material backward when activated, revealing a mouth. An animated tongue was added later.

The RMS Titanic was one of the first shots ILM completed; they wanted a powerful image for the scene and considered using the Hindenburg airship complete with flaming passengers and luggage, a subway train carrying rotting passengers, and a graveyard with exploding headstones. A miniature model of the Titanic with slightly modified aspects was used instead; the position of the ship's name was altered to make it clearly identifiable. Extras were filmed wearing period costume, seaweed, and dripping water but many of the minor details were lost in the wide shot. A scale model of the museum was created because Reitman wanted to be able to show the slime oozing from cracks and seams. Several last-minute effect shots were added due to the hectic schedule. The ghost train was intended to be a subway car, but there was no time to find a suitable model, so an antique train was used. The severed heads were sourced from multiple places; poorer quality heads were placed further away from the camera. The theater ghost took three weeks to build and required four puppeteers. The Washington Square monster was animated in stop motion by Phil Tippett, who accepted the job on the condition that the effect was no longer than 160 frames, was built on an existing model, and could be done in one take. Tippett was seriously injured in a car accident during development but continued to work and finished his effect in time. The slime-possessed fur coat was achieved using four coats with parts controlled with servo motors. ILM considered using live animals for the segment but abandoned the idea.

=== Vigo the Carpathian ===
The canvas painting of Vigo as portrayed by Wilhelm von Homburg as it hung in the ILM offices in 2011. The character went through many designs, and this canvas painting was in actuality a photograph of von Homburg taken on a set that was blown up in size and treated to resemble an oil painting.

The concept for the physical form of the central villain Vigo went through many changes, including a plan to transform him into a large monstrosity. There was difficulty determining how Vigo would interact outside his painting. Vigo was intended to have heavier creature makeup, but after Von Homburg was cast, his distinctive look meant the extra makeup was largely unnecessary.

In early 1989, ILM contacted Glen Eytchison to develop a painting that could come to life. Eytchison specialized in tableaux vivants - the use of static sets and stationary actors to create the illusion of a flat painting. Muren said that his team could have worked out a way to achieve the desired effect, but they did not have enough time and needed to enlist an expert. The aim was to depict what appeared to be a painting of Vigo that would come to life to shock the audience. ILM spent months producing concepts of the painting's look but Reitman rejected them for being too similar to "Conan [the Barbarian]". Eytchison and his team researched the look of a 16th-century warlord and references the period's painters to match the contemporaneous art styles.

Eytchison's team painted a background and individual items including skies, skulls, and trees on acetate. This allowed Reitman to view combinations quickly; he chose his favored design in 15 minutes. Local painter Lou Police produced a painting from this concept; Reitman approved it but Eytchison realized a painting would not be realistic enough to allow them to switch between it and the actor. Eytchison's team decided to create a small set resembling the painting; it had structural elements, including styrofoam skulls, in which Von Homburg could stand. Von Homburg's costume and the set were painted by the same team to ensure they had the same texture and blended together.

Once the set arrived at ILM, Von Homburg was positioned in it wearing full costume, makeup, and prosthetics. Lighting was used to eliminate shadows, creating a flat image. A photograph was then taken and enlarged to be used as the painting. Welch's department treated the photograph to make it closely resemble an oil painting. Scenes of Von Homburg on the set delivering his dialog and stepping out of the set as if leaving the painting were filmed; according to Eytchison, the actor struggled with the action and Reitman did not like the effect. The ending was changed completely, eliminating the living picture concept. When Vigo interacts from the painting in the finished film, the image is replaced by Von Homburg's disembodied head floating over a miniature river-of-slime set built from foam by ILM. When leaving the painting, Vigo disappears and materializes into the scene. Another concept had him "peel" from the canvas, and another had the slime bring other paintings to life to aid him. A molded mask was created to represent his inner evil; it was worn by Harold Weed as the possessed version of Aykroyd's character.

=== Technology ===
Ghostbusters' hardware consultant Stephen Dane was responsible for much of the Ghostbusters' equipment and their vehicle, the Ectomobile; he designed new equipment for Ghostbusters II in an uncredited role. Dane revised the designs of the proton pack weapons, the ghost trap, and the Ectomobile, which became the Ectomobile 1A. Dane designed new equipment including the giga-meter, the slime scooper, and the slime blower—a large tank connected to a slime-spewing nozzle. He re-purposed leftover prop warning labels and symbols from his work on Blade Runner (1982) to make the equipment look more authentic.

The slime blower weapons were three times heavier than the proton packs; the tanks did not contain slime, which was pumped through the guns from off-camera. The bulky proton packs, which were considered heavy and uncomfortable during the filming of Ghostbusters, were redesigned to weigh 28 lb (13 kg) in comparison with the 30 lb (14 kg) and 50 lb (23 kg) versions used on the previous film. The new design offered more comfort while removing some of the powered effects. Muren's team redesigned the proton pack neutrino wand beams to be multi-functional, allowing them to be used as lassos or fishing lines to capture ghosts instead of being straight beams. Five remotely controlled baby strollers were used to create the possessed stroller in the film's opening; motors and driveshafts were concealed with the stroller's chrome body, and brakes that could stop it immediately or slow it gradually were used. Gaspar employed two-time national miniature-car champion Jay Halsey to drive the stroller; he had to weave it between traffic from up to 75 ft (23 m) away.

== Release ==
=== Context ===
In 1989, more sequels were scheduled for release than in any previous year, including Indiana Jones and the Last Crusade, The Karate Kid Part III, Star Trek V: The Final Frontier, and Lethal Weapon 2. Also released that year were original hits that would become popular classics like Uncle Buck; Honey, I Shrunk the Kids; When Harry Met Sally...; and Dead Poets Society. That year's most anticipated film was Batman, which was scheduled for release a week after Ghostbusters II, and whose logo had become ubiquitous through a significant marketing campaign coordinated by Warner Bros. Shortly before its release, a "major theater chain" executive said they expected Ghostbusters II to make approximately $150 million during its run, behind Indiana Jones and the Last Crusade ($225 million) and Batman ($175 million), and ahead of Lethal Weapon 2 ($100 million).

Ghostbusters II was originally scheduled for release in July 1989 but less than three months before release, it was brought forward to June to avoid direct competition with Batman. The premiere of Ghostbusters II took place on June 15, 1989, at Grauman's Chinese Theater, with an after-party that required payment to attend at the Hollywood Palladium; the entrance fees collected were donated to Saint John's Health Center.

=== Box office ===
Ghostbusters II received a wide release on June 16, 1989, in 2,410 theaters, compared with the original film's opening on 1,339. Compared to Ghostbusters' $13 million opening weekend, Ghostbusters II film earned $29.5 million—an average of $12,229 per theater—as the number one film of the weekend, ahead of the action-adventure film Indiana Jones and the Last Crusade ($11.7 million) which was in its fourth week of release and drama film Dead Poets Society ($9.1 million), which was in its third. Based on its gross and an average increase in ticket price of 22% since Ghostbusters' release, an estimated 2 million more people went to see the film's opening. It broke the all-time record for a one-day opening with approximately $10 million on its opening Friday; it was also the biggest non-holiday opening weekend with $29.5 million, narrowly beating Indiana Jones and the Last Crusade's opening three-day gross of $29.4 million.

Ghostbusters II's revenue was exceeded the following weekend by Batman's $15.6 million opening day takings, and $43.6 million opening weekend earnings earned from 2,194 theaters. Ghostbusters II earned another $13.8 million—a 53% drop from the previous weekend—bringing its 10-day total to $58.8 million, putting it in third place behind Batman and another new release, the Moranis-starring comedy film Honey, I Shrunk the Kids ($14.3 million), which was bolstered by a heavily marketed seven-minute Roger Rabbit short film playing before it. This weekend gross saw Ghostbusters II contribute to the highest-grossing weekend ever at the time, with total box office takings of $92 million across all theaters.

Compared to the original Ghostbusters' seven-week run at number one, Ghostbusters II never regained the top slot, falling to number four in its third week behind the debuting drama The Karate Kid Part III, and to number 5 in its fourth week behind the action film Lethal Weapon 2 and black comedy Weekend at Bernie's, both of which were new releases. Ghostbusters II left the top-ten-grossing films by its seventh week and was removed from cinemas entirely by late-September after fifteen weeks. In total, Ghostbusters II earned $112.5 million in North America, less than half that of the original's revenue, making it the seventh-highest-grossing film of the year, behind Back to the Future Part II ($118.4 million), Lethal Weapon 2 ($147.3 million), Honey, I Shrunk the Kids ($130.7 million), Look Who's Talking ($140.1 million), Indiana Jones and the Last Crusade ($197.1 million), and the highest domestic grossing film of that year, Batman ($251.2 million).

Outside North America, Ghostbusters II is estimated to have earned approximately $102.9 million, nearly doubling the original's overseas takings and raising its worldwide total to $215.4 million. (Note: The 1989 box office gross of $215.4 million is equivalent to $559 million in 2025.) This figure makes it the eighth-highest-grossing film worldwide of 1989, falling approximately $67 million short of Ghostbusters' original theatrical revenue.

=== Critical response ===
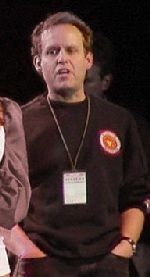
Peter MacNicol in 2001. Reviewers were consistent in praise for his comedic performance.

Ghostbusters II received generally negative reviews from critics. Audiences responded more positively; CinemaScore polls reported that moviegoers gave an average rating of "A−" on a scale of A+ to F.

Dave Kehr and USA Today's Mike Clark were critical of attempts at making the Ghostbusters more mature which made the film feel "tired" and lacking in surprises. They said that Ghostbusters had succeeded by projecting childlike fantasies onto adult characters who snubbed authority and bonded in a clubhouse, but by taking a surreal comedic fantasy and adding humanity to the central characters, the sequel had become "Four Ghostbusters and a Baby", a reference to the 1987 comedy film Three Men and a Baby. Roger Ebert called it a disappointment, saying he reviewed Ghostbusters II in a public screening and heard only one laugh during the entire film.

Several reviewers criticized the film for too closely emulating the structure and story elements of its predecessor. Gene Siskel called it a poor copy that offered nothing new, as though they "were filming the first draft of a script". Richard Schickel was critical of the glut of sequels in 1989 in his review. He said that Ghostbusters II offered only slight variations over the original without further developing the characters, and had a "shamelessly" similar ending. Time Out echoed sentiments that the film largely retraced the events of its predecessor, and the addition of an infant came across as a convenience. Desson Thomson said Ghostbusters II felt like an extended version of its predecessor without as many impressive special effects. Writing for Empire, William Thomas said the script was sharp but certainly aimed towards entertaining younger audience members.

Sheila Benson praised the film and said its denouement was superior to that of the original. She appreciated that despite being a sequel, it did not rely on inside jokes that might alienate audiences and that the interplay between the actors felt inclusive. Hal Hinson said that while "big and dumb and clunky" like the first film, Ghostbusters II offered more personality. Hinson considered sequels to be generally lazy and reliant on the success of the previous film, but felt that Ghostbusters II looked better and was confident enough to experiment with the source material. He nevertheless criticized it for what he saw as a lack of tension and plot development. Vincent Canby said the film was funnier and not as "oppressively extravagant" as Ghostbusters; he believed the plot lacked depth but that the overall tone of the film was "remarkably cheerful".

Some reviewers found the film to be poorly paced, leaving scenes feeling overlong, and that its best moments felt both few and infrequent. Others echoed this sentiment, saying that it lacked the energy of Ghostbusters, and was too laid back. Writing for The Globe and Mail, Rick Groen considered the film self-important and mediocre, and criticized Reitman's direction for lacking visual imagination. The film's special effects generally received praise. Benson called them "impressive", and Caroll highlighted moments like the ghostly, resurrected Titanic, but she felt that the creatures lacked any real menace. According to Variety, the film's slime and visuals would appeal to children, while adults could appreciate the witty dialogue.

Unlike Ghostbusters, reviewers were more conflicted over Murray's performance in the sequel. Kehr said that his performance retained "bright" moments, but he seemed less energetic than in his previous film Scrooged. Rosenbaum concurred, stating that the actor's trademark comedic indifference seemed to be lacking commitment, and Caroll said that his well-received performance in Ghostbusters had been replaced by a "smug swagger and constant smirking" that she found irritating. Variety considered his character is central to the film because of his ad-libbed dialog, and Groen argued that Murray essentially carried the film alone. Hinson said that Murray's comedic performance was vital to tempering the film from becoming over-sentimental when discussing battling negativity with positivity.

Thomas claimed that the previous film had allowed Murray's character to be aloof, selfish, and immature, while Ghostbusters II pushed him towards being in a mature relationship and demonstrating genuine human warmth, which he felt did not work. Benson commented that Murray's and Weaver's characters felt unconnected and more like rivals than lovers. Thomas and Siskel said that the film's emphasis on this romantic subplot was to its detriment, both occupying too much of its runtime and largely removing Murray from the action scenes. Clark lamented that Weaver was underutilized in a stereotypical working mother role.

MacNicol's performance was frequently praised. Groen, who was critical of much of the cast for lackluster performances, said that his "wickedly funny" performance was the film's sole surprising feature. Canby and Kehr concurred on MacNicol being a highlight of the film, Thomas saying that his character would be impersonated by children everywhere. Carroll called it a "deliriously over-the-top performance". Moranis was also singled out for his comedic performance. Kehr and Clark appreciated the "rewarding" romantic subplot between his character and Potts'. Thomson said that the film's best moments, provided by Murray, Moranis, and Aykroyd, were too few, which left him wanting more.

== Post-release ==
=== Performance analysis and aftermath ===
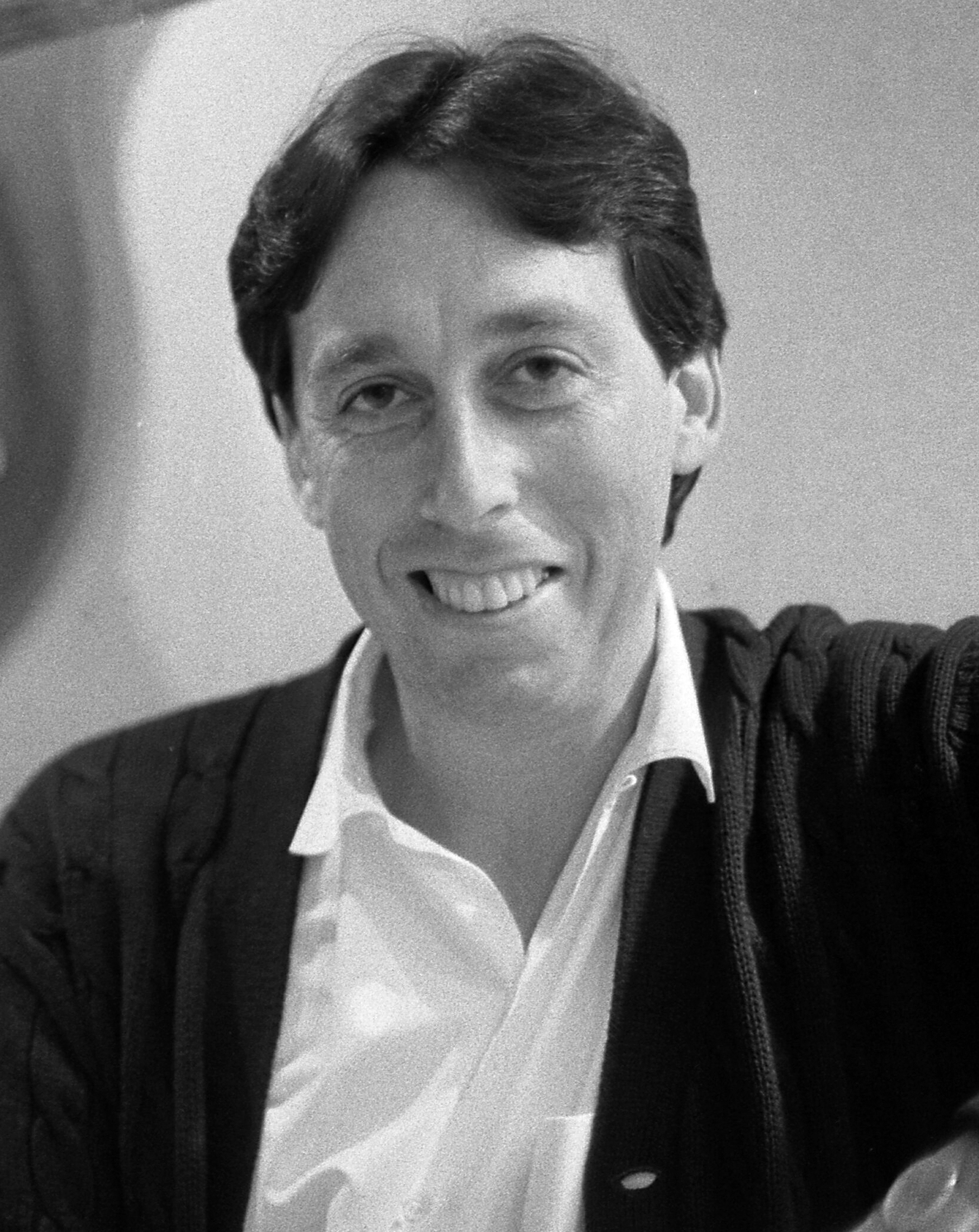
Director Ivan Reitman in 1984. He blamed the film's perceived failure on audiences' desire for darker films.

Financially, Ghostbusters II was a relative success but it failed to meet studio expectations as a sequel to the highest-grossing comedy film of its time. Despite being predicted to outperform its rival films before its release, it ultimately failed to do so. As a part of the most successful summer for film to that date, Ghostbusters II was seen as a critical and commercial failure; it also failed to garner the same passionate response from critics and fans as its predecessor. While Columbia did not comment, industry experts believed the film was undone, at least partly, by the combination of Batman attracting teenage audiences and Honey, I Shrunk the Kids taking family audiences. Another issue was the quantity of films being released close together and unexpected successes that meant films were staying in theaters longer than anticipated. By only mid-July, one theater was alternating Ghostbusters II and The Karate Kid III on the same screen because of their diminishing returns to play Batman and Lethal Weapon 2 on other screens.

Reitman blamed changes in what audiences wanted from films. He felt contemporaneous society was more negative and cynical, and noted the popularity of Batman, which had a darker tone whereas Ghostbusters II is more positive, particularly its upbeat, optimistic ending that shows New Yorkers coming together to help defeat Vigo. Reitman also felt the novelty of Ghostbusters could not be repeated because big surprises like ghosts and epic finales were now expected. In 2014, he said that "it didn't all come together ... we just sort of got off on the wrong foot story-wise on that film". Reviewers often noted that the film largely resembles its predecessor down to the story structure, a giant figure stomping through New York, and a mid-film montage set to a theme song. Some noted that releasing a film set at Christmas in June may also have worked against it. It has been suggested the five-year gap between films worked against it, both losing the momentum generated by the original and setting expectations too high. This period also allowed a potential cultural saturation of the brand through the cartoon series and merchandise.

Reitman was disappointed with Ghostbusters II's performance and said making the film had not been as much fun an experience as working on Ghostbusters. He told Columbia he would not be part of a third film, and intended to break from comedies altogether. In a 2008 interview, Murray said: "We did a sequel and it was sort of rather unsatisfying for me, because the first one to me was ... the real thing ... They'd written a whole different movie than the one [initially discussed]. And the special-effects guys got it ... There were a few great scenes in it, but it wasn't the same movie". Moranis said: "To have something as offbeat, unusual, and unpredictable [as] the first Ghostbusters, it's next to impossible to create something better. [And] with sequels ... they want better". Much as with the first film, Hudson was disappointed his role was relatively small. In Ghostbusters, many of his major scenes had been given to Murray who was better-known, and Hudson felt the sequel continued to marginalize his character. He affirmed that despite this, he appreciated the role because of the positive way fans have reacted to it.

=== Home media ===
Ghostbusters II was released on VHS on November 22, 1989, only shortly after the end of its theatrical run. Since the early 1980s, home media was normally released at least six months after films launched in theaters, and in the case of blockbusters like Ghostbusters II and Batman, anywhere from nine to twelve months later. To take advantage of the Christmas season, Ghostbusters II, Batman, and When Harry Met Sally... were all released before the end of the year. The Ghostbusters II VHS was priced at $90 and aimed towards rentals rather than individual purchases. The film entered the rental chart at number 10 and by late December it peaked as the second top VHS rental behind Batman. The home video release was controversial because the letterboxed versions reformatted the film to a less wide 1.66:1 aspect ratio, resulting in much of the original 2.35:1 picture being cropped out despite the use of black bars on the screen. A DVD version was released in 1999.

Blu-ray disc editions were released to celebrate the film's 25th and 30th anniversaries in 2014 and 2019 respectively; the film was remastered and the releases feature 4K resolution video, deleted scenes, alternate takes, and an interview with Aykroyd and Reitman. The 30th-anniversary version was packaged in a limited-edition steel book cover, and also included Ghostbusters and commentary by Reitman, Aykroyd, and producer Joe Medjuck. The film was released as part of the 8-disc Ghostbusters: Ultimate Collection Blu-ray and Ultra HD Blu-ray boxset in February 2022, alongside Ghostbusters and its second sequel Ghostbusters: Afterlife (2021), and the 2016 reboot Ghostbusters: Answer the Call. Presented in a ghost trap-shaped box, the release features unreleased deleted scenes from Ghostbusters II and an edited-for-TV version including alternate scenes and takes.

The original soundtrack of Ghostbusters II was first released on compact disc in 1989, peaking at number fourteen on the Billboard 200 music chart. Brown's song "On Our Own" was a number-one song on the Billboard Hot R&B/Hip-Hop Songs music chart for one week in early August before being replaced by Batman's own hit song "Batdance" by Prince. "On Our Own" peaked at number two on the Billboard Hot 100 chart, again behind "Batdance", and later behind "Right Here Waiting" by Richard Marx. "On Our Own" spent 20 weeks on the chart. The Run-DMC version of "Ghostbusters" failed to develop the same level of enduring fandom as Parker, Jr.'s original. In 2014, the Run-DMC version was released on a special-edition, white vinyl record that was presented in a marshmallow-scented jacket. The record also contains the Parker, Jr. version of the song and was released to celebrate the 30th and 25th anniversaries of Ghostbusters and Ghostbusters II respectively. The same year, the soundtrack was first released in digital format. Edelman's score remained unreleased until 2021. Available on vinyl, compact disc, and digital formats, the release included 16 tracks from the film, some of which were re-recorded for the album, and an unused song made for the film.

== Thematic analysis ==
=== Positivity vs. negativity ===
Several elements of Ghostbusters II deal with the consequences of actions. Instead of being lauded as heroes after defeating Gozer, the Ghostbusters are driven out of business because of the associated destruction they caused. The slime amasses beneath the city as a consequence of negative emotions projected by New Yorkers. When writing the script, Aykroyd and Ramis wanted to show that negativity had a lasting impact on the person inflicting it or the one receiving it. Aykroyd noted that, at the time, he considered major cities to be places where danger was rife and life held little value. Writing for Mashable in 2019, Pravit Chatterjee argues that this theme is more relevant in the contemporary age of social media and hate speech.

Similarly, positivity is presented as a uniquely powerful force. Their previous combined efforts defeated Gozer, a god of destruction, but the Ghostbusters are completely powerless against Vigo and the accumulated negativity fuelling him. It is only when the citizens gathered outside the museum unite to sing a chorus of "Auld Lang Syne" that their positivity overwhelms Vigo, allowing the Ghostbusters to defeat him. In 2016, A. Bowdoin van Riper wrote that while destruction-heavy films set in New York made before the September 11 terrorist attack had taken on darker, unintended meanings, Ghostbusters II was now more relevant. Its ending, which can be seen as "hokey" or false, now seemed "touchingly real". Murray described it as a "story about innocence restored, and good values, and the power of faith in ordinary people". Unlike Ghostbusters, Ghostbusters II lauds the values of community and family over their Ghostbusters' personal successes. Indeed, the Ghostbusters' involvement in the sequel comes from the threat to their personal acquaintance Dana Barrett and her son. They are drawn out of retirement and break the rules of their legal settlement with the city to help, despite the lack of financial rewards and the personal risk to themselves.

=== Fatherhood ===
Ghostbusters II is among many films released during the 1980s and 1990s that dealt with issues of fatherhood; these included Three Men and a Baby (1987), Honey, I Shrunk the Kids (1989), Uncle Buck (1989), Kindergarten Cop (1990), Parenthood (1989), Hook (1991), and Mrs. Doubtfire (1993). These film types appeared among their respective release years' highest-grossing films, and focus on redeeming or celebrating the concept of fatherhood in different forms from warm and friendly to authoritarian. These father figures are initially unprepared for their responsibility. Nicole Matthews argues that the need to present a film targeted at both adults and children leads to the central characters being infantilized and immature. These films each share a similar concept, that female characters are either absent or not important to the overall story.

Ghostbusters II's driving plot is ostensibly about a mother (Dana Barrett) trying to protect her son who is the target of a malevolent force. Instead, it becomes about Peter Venkman and his relationship to the child, both representing a surrogate paternal figure and lamenting that he is not the child's biological father. The film focuses on moments of paternal tenderness such as Venkman using his treasured football shirt to clothe Oscar. This focus is evident during the film's finale where Vigo's portrait is replaced by an image of the Ghostbusters as four paternal figures surrounding Oscar, with no female present. Instead a sword is depicted penetrating a stone; a symbol of fertility.

Jim Whalley wrote that when Dana describes Venkman as "the most charming, kindest and most unusual" man she has met, "kind" would not be an applicable description of his character in Ghostbusters, evidencing his growth and maturity in the intervening years. Venkman's inability to commit to Dana ended their original relationship, but he is shown to have changed and now be willing to serve as a partner and father. Similarly, Murray's comedic talents are seemingly ineffective throughout the film, unable to charm his way out of difficult situations as in Ghostbusters and further the narrative. He instead serves as comic relief, and it is the Ghostbusters' noble heroism that progresses the story.

=== Politics ===
As with the previous film, Ghostbusters II criticizes political institutions. The team actively questions authority in a deteriorating city filled with unhappy people. Government representatives are shown to be more concerned with proper processes than the imminent threat of the ghosts. They are shown to be incompetent or pursuing an agenda of self-interest that means they cannot be trusted to protect the people they represent.

The Ghostbusters' outspokenness results in them being sent to a psychiatric institution to silence them. The Ghostbusters are freed from the governmental bonds—the legal requirements barring them from operating as paranormal exterminators—but only while they are solving more problems than they create. Christine Alice Corcos describes the courtroom scene, in which the executed Scoleri brothers' return to wreak havoc, as a demonstration of the failure of the legal system. The government must again empower the Ghostbusters to deal with the problem, reaffirming the team's personal liberty over government influence. Corcos also analyzed the slime as a symbol of pollution. The human soul is polluted by negativity, which is given a physical form as slime beneath the city until there is too much for the Earth to handle.

Zoila Clark considered the ghosts to represent immigrants to America. Several antagonists and ghostly forces are foreign—the Scoleri brothers, the passengers of the Titanic, Janosz, and Vigo. Vigo is compared to Count Dracula, a threatening foreign entity that hypnotizes subjects with his eyes, and aims to take an American woman for his own. The Statue of Liberty is of French origin and although it is described as a symbol of purity, Murray's character sexualizes it, defining it outside the American stereotype of purity.

== Legacy ==
=== Critical reassessment ===
Since its release, Ghostbusters II has been labeled as the film that "killed" the franchise because it made less money from a larger budget than Ghostbusters and because the filming experience and resulting reception dissuaded Murray from involvement in a third film. While some modern critics continue to criticize it as a bad film or inferior to its predecessor, others argue that it suffers from being compared with Ghostbusters and is otherwise above average. In a 2014 interview, Reitman defended the film, saying while it was unfairly compared with Batman at the time, he felt Ghostbusters II still holds up well against the superhero film.

Digital Spy defended the film as being as good as or better than Ghostbusters. It said the plot of Ghostbusters II is arguably better executed than that of the first film, with multiple threads coming together in a "seamless" third act with a positive ending that works better with modern audiences. Den of Geek compared it to sequels to other genre-specific classics like Back to the Future Part II and Indiana Jones and the Temple of Doom (1984), which were considered not as good as the original but as good films in their own right, while Ghostbusters II is perceived as being a bad film despite a close similarity to the original. Deadspin said that like those aforementioned films, Ghostbusters II's darker setpieces and comedy made it more suited for adults than children, but that it is better than most people remember. Uproxx called it the ideal film to watch during the New Year period because it offers an unsubtle, simple morality tale about treating others well.

Contemporary review aggregation website Rotten Tomatoes offers a 57% approval rating from 46 critics, with an average rating of 5.7/10. The site's consensus reads: "Thanks to the cast, Ghostbusters 2 is reasonably amusing, but it lacks the charm, wit, and energy of its predecessor". The film has a score of 56 out of 100 on Metacritic based on 14 critical reviews, indicating "mixed or average" reviews. In 2009, Den of Geek listed it as the eighteenth best blockbuster sequel of all time.

=== Merchandise ===
Film merchandising was a relatively new concept created mainly by the success of the Star Wars series. Merchandising for Ghostbusters was mostly unsuccessful as there was no plan in place to immediately capitalize on the film's unexpected success; toys in particular sold poorly until the release of the cartoon spin-off The Real Ghostbusters. However, sequels were seen as a brighter prospect because they featured established characters. Over 24 tie-in toys were released alongside the film, including water guns, colored slimes, coloring books, comics, and children's meals. Ghostbusters action figures were the fifth-most in-demand toy for the 1989 Christmas season according to a survey of 15,000 retailers. Approximately 2.8 million units of a promotional noisemaker toy called the "Ghostblaster", which was released across 3,100 outlets of the fast-food restaurant Hardee's, were recalled in June 1989 because of reports children were ingesting its small batteries. Now Comics released a three-part comic book miniseries adaptation of the film set in The Real Ghostbusters cartoon universe. The story included subplots from the film, including Ray's possession while driving the Ectomobile and Tully trying to capture Slimer.

Several video games were released around the release of the film; Ghostbusters II in 1989 for personal computers, Ghostbusters II (published by Activision) in 1990 for the Nintendo Entertainment System (NES), and New Ghostbusters II (as Ghostbusters II), also in 1990 for the Nintendo Game Boy. New Ghostbusters II was also released for the NES in Europe and Japan but could not be released in America because Activision held the rights to the game there.

Since its release, Ghostbusters II merchandise has included Playmobil sets with action figures and a model of the Ectomobile 1A. A board game, Ghostbusters: The Board Game II, was released in 2017 by Cryptozoic Entertainment. Based on the film, it casts the players as the Ghostbusters and tasks them with defeating Vigo and his ghostly minions. The game's creation was crowdfunded, raising over $760,000. The 2019 Halloween Horror Nights event at Universal Studios Hollywood and Universal Studios Florida held a 'Ghostbusters-themed haunted maze that featured locations, characters, and ghosts from Ghostbusters, and the Scoleri Brothers.

== Sequels and spin-offs ==
Discussion about a sequel took place during filming of Ghostbusters II, but Ramis was dismissive because of the actors' ages and the difficulty in getting the cast together. Despite Ghostbusters II's relative failure, the name recognition and popularity of the actors and their characters meant a third film was still pursued by the studio. The concept failed to progress for many years, reportedly primarily because of Murray's reluctance to participate. The Real Ghostbusters series continued to air until 1991 and ended after seven seasons; according to Medjuck, the cartoon series technically took place after the events of Ghostbusters II. The Real Ghostbusters was followed in 1997 by a sequel series called Extreme Ghostbusters, which aimed to reinvigorate the franchise but lasted for only one season. In the years that followed the release of Ghostbusters II, Aykroyd continued attempts to develop a film sequel throughout the 1990s to the early 2010s. By 1999, he had completed a 122-page concept for a sequel called Ghostbusters III: Hellbent, which would add several new characters and take them to ManHellton, a demonic version of Manhattan, where they would encounter the demon Lucifer.

In 2009, Ghostbusters: The Video Game featuring story consulting by Ramis and Aykroyd, and the likenesses and voice acting of Murray, Aykroyd, Ramis, Hudson, Potts, and William Atherton (who portrayed Walter Peck in the first movie), was released. Set two years after Ghostbusters II, the story follows the Ghostbusters training a new recruit (the player) to combat a ghostly threat related to Gozer. The game was well-received, earning award nominations for its storytelling. Aykroyd said the game is "essentially the third movie". The game establishes that following the events of Ghostbusters II the still-possessed portrait of Vigo became a decoration at the Ghostbusters' firehouse. Ghostbusters: The Return (2004) was the first in a planned series of sequel novels before the publisher, iBooks, went out of business. Several Ghostbusters comic books have also continued the original characters' adventures across the globe and in other dimensions.

Following Ramis's death in 2014, Reitman chose to no longer consider directing a potential third Ghostbusters film. He determined the creative control shared by himself, Ramis, Aykroyd, and Murray was holding the franchise back and negotiated a deal with the studio to sell the rights; he spent two weeks persuading Murray. Reitman refused to release details about the deal but said that "the creators would be enriched for the rest of our lives, and for the rest of our children’s lives". He and Aykroyd set up the production company Ghost Corps to continue the franchise, starting with the 2016 female-led reboot, Ghostbusters. Before its release, the film was beset by controversies and on release it attracted mixed reviews and was considered a box office bomb. The franchise returned to the original canon with Ghostbusters: Afterlife (2021), directed by Reitman's son Jason, and Ghostbusters: Frozen Empire (2024).

== Works cited ==
- Benson, Sheila (June 16, 1989). "Movie Review: Return of the Old Haunt". Los Angeles Times. Los Angeles. p. 1.
- Bernard, Jami (November 1989). "Who? Me a Villain?". Starlog. United States: Starlog Group, Inc.
- Clark, Mike (June 16, 1989). "A so-so return to the scene of the slime". USA Today. United States: Gannett. p. 1D.
- Clark, Zoila (2015). "Immigrants as aliens in the Ghostbusters films". Australasian Journal of Popular Culture. 4 (1). Bristol, United Kingdom: Intellect Books: 29–42. doi:10.1386/ajpc.4.1.29_1.
- Corcos, Christine Alice (1997). "'Who Ya Gonna C(S)ite?' Ghostbusters and the Environmental Regulation Debate". Florida State University Journal of Land Use and Environmental Law. 13 (1). Baton Rouge, Louisiana: Louisiana State University Law Center. Archived from the original on January 12, 2020.
- Eisenberg, Adam (November 1989). "Ghostbusters II: Ghostbusters Revisited". Cinefex. No. 40. United States. ISSN 0198-1056. Archived (PDF) from the original on August 31, 2019.
- Groen, Rick (June 19, 1989). "Film Review Ghostbusters II". The Globe and Mail. United States: The Woodbridge Company. p. D9.
- Matthews, Nicole (2000). Comic Politics: Gender in Hollywood Comedy After the New Right. Manchester, England: Manchester University Press. ISBN 978-0-7190-5503-4.
- McCabe, Joseph (2016). "Bustin' Out a Sequel". The Complete SFX Guide to Ghostbusters. United Kingdom: Future plc.
- McCabe, Joseph (2016). "Set 'Em Up Joe". The Complete SFX Guide to Ghostbusters. United Kingdom: Future plc.
- Bowdoin van Riper, A. (2016). "'Who You Gonna Call?' The Supernatural and the Service Economy in the Ghostbusters Films". In Miller, Cynthia J.; Bowdoin van Riper, A. (eds.). The Laughing Dead: The Horror-Comedy Film from Bride of Frankenstein to Zombieland. Lanham, Maryland: Rowman & Littlefield. pp. 201–214. ISBN 978-1-4422-6833-3. Archived from the original on October 10, 2022.
- Salmon, Will (2016). "Boxer, Beatle". The Complete SFX Guide to Ghostbusters. United Kingdom: Future plc.
- Schickel, Richard (June 26, 1989). "Time for the Ants to Revolt? Two big, dull sequels hint at a drizzly summer". Time. United States: Time Inc. p. 89.
- Van Hise, James (w), Tobias, John (p), Rankin, Rich (i), Dechnik, Suzanne (col), Nakrosis, Dan (let). "Together Again for the First Time Part II" The Real Ghostbusters starring in Ghostbusters II, no. 1 (October 1989). Chicago, Illinois: NOW Comics.
- Van Hise, James (w), Tobias, John (p), Rankin, Rich (i), Dechnik, Suzanne (col), Nakrosis, Dan (let). "The Slime of Their Lives" The Real Ghostbusters starring in Ghostbusters II, no. 2 (November 1989). Chicago, Illinois: NOW Comics.
- Van Hise, James (w), Tobias, John (p), Rankin, Rich (i), Dechnik, Suzanne (col), Nakrosis, Dan (let). "A Big Date with Liberty" The Real Ghostbusters starring in Ghostbusters II, no. 3 (December 1989). Chicago, Illinois: NOW Comics.
- Whalley, J. (2010). Saturday Night Live, Hollywood Comedy, and American Culture: From Chevy Chase to Tina Fey. London, United Kingdom: Palgrave Macmillan. ISBN 978-0-230-10358-0.
