= Ghostbusters (2016 soundtrack) =

Soundtrack of the 2016 film Ghostbusters

Ghostbusters: Original Motion Picture Soundtrack is the soundtrack to the 2016 film Ghostbusters, a reboot of the eponymous 1984 film and the third installment of the Ghostbusters franchise. The soundtrack was released by RCA Records on July 15, 2016, alongside the film and featured 14 songs—four of them preceded the soundtrack as singles. Ghostbusters: Original Motion Picture Score is the film score composed by Theodore Shapiro, released through Sony Classical Records on July 8.

== Ghostbusters: Original Motion Picture Soundtrack ==
Ghostbusters: Original Motion Picture Soundtrack

Soundtrack album by Various artists
- Released: July 15, 2016
- Recorded: 2016
- Length: 46:15
- Label: RCA

Singles from Ghostbusters: Original Motion Picture Soundtrack
- 1. "Good Girls" Released: June 3, 2016; 2. "Saw It Coming" Released: June 10, 2016; 3. "Ghostbusters (I'm Not Afraid)" Released: June 23, 2016; 4. "Girls Talk Boys" Released: July 15, 2016

The soundtrack to the film consisted of original songs performed by Zayn Malik, Elle King, 5 Seconds of Summer, Mark Ronson, Passion Pit, A$AP Ferg, among others. It featured three other versions of "Ghostbusters"—along with the original version by Ray Parker Jr., and two cover versions of it being performed by Walk the Moon, Pentatonix, Fall Out Boy and Missy Elliott. RCA Records distributed the soundtrack in digital and physical formats on July 15, 2016, alongside the film.

=== Singles ===
King performed the pop rock song "Good Girls" which was released as a digital single on June 3, 2016; an accompanying music video of the song was released on July 13, two days ahead of the film's release. The song is featured in the end credits of the film. The second song, "Saw It Coming", performed by G-Eazy featuring Jeremih was released on June 10. Fall Out Boy's version of "Ghostbusters" entitled "Ghostbusters (I'm Not Afraid)" released as the third single from the album on June 23. The fourth song "Girls Talk Boys" by 5 Seconds of Summer was released along with the film's soundtrack on July 15.

=== Reception ===
Unlike the predecessors, the album garnered a mixed reception. James Christopher Monger of AllMusic wrote "the album, much like the film, treads familiar ground [...] but the rest of the set feels rushed and forgettable". Fall Out Boy's cover of "Ghostbusters" was negatively received with criticism for its musical structure. Hilary Busis of Vanity Fair criticised the song as "disastrously overproduced" and felt that it "strips away the original's goofy charm, replacing it with pounding percussion and Patrick Stump's signature nasal wail. It's like Alien Ant Farm's 2001 cover of "Smooth Criminal," but less nuanced." Randall Roberts of Los Angeles Times also wrote: "With lyrics seemingly written during a bathroom break, its singsong rhymes and cheesy '80s production haven't aged well." Ethan Jacobs of Inverse was much critical of Malik's "Who", albeit praising the vocals and music, he found its use as an original song in the film, which was being a romantic number, felt to be lame and cheesy.

=== Track listing ===
No.	Title	Performed by	Length
1.	"Ghostbusters"	Walk the Moon	3:44
2.	"Saw It Coming"	G-Eazy featuring Jeremih	3:29
3.	"Good Girls"	Elle King	2:59
4.	"Girls Talk Boys"	5 Seconds of Summer	3:36
5.	"Who"	Zayn Malik	2:54
6.	"Ghostbusters"	Pentatonix	2:52
7.	"Ghoster"	Wolf Alice	2:30
8.	"Ghostbusters (I'm Not Afraid)"	Fall Out Boy featuring Missy Elliott	3:05
9.	"Get Ghost"	Mark Ronson, Passion Pit, and A$AP Ferg	3:36
10.	"Party Up (Up in Here)"	DMX	4:31
11.	"Rhythm of the Night"	DeBarge	3:50
12.	"American Woman"	Muddy Magnolias	3:01
13.	"Want Some More"	Beasts of Mayhem	2:03
14.	"Ghostbusters"	Ray Parker Jr.	4:05
Total length:			46:15

=== Charts ===
Chart (2016)	Peak position
Australian Albums (ARIA)	21
Canadian Albums (Billboard)	19
US Billboard 200	18
US Soundtrack Albums (Billboard)	1

== Ghostbusters: Original Motion Picture Score ==
Ghostbusters: Original Motion Picture Score

Soundtrack album by Theodore Shapiro
- Released: July 8, 2016 (digital); July 15, 2016 (CD)
- Genre: Film score
- Length: 51:27
- Label: Sony Classical

Theodore Shapiro chronology
Central Intelligence (2016)	Ghostbusters: Original Motion Picture Score (2016)	Office Christmas Party (2016)

In September 2015, Theodore Shapiro was announced to score music for the film, after previously working with Feig on Spy (2015). The album, which consisted of 21 tracks from Shapiro's score, was released by Sony Classical Records digitally on July 8, 2016, and in CDs on July 15.

=== Track listing ===
No.	Title	Length
1.	"The Aldridge Mansion"	2:57
2.	"The Garrett Attack"	1:29
3.	"Never Invited"	1:23
4.	"Distinct Human Form"	2:26
5.	"The Universe Shall Bend"	2:22
6.	"Subway Ghost Attack"	3:21
7.	"Ghost Girl"	0:59
8.	"Mannequins"	2:12
9.	"Ghost In a Box"	0:50
10.	"Dr. Heiss"	3:21
11.	"Ley Lines"	3:47
12.	"Pester The Living"	2:48
13.	"I Will Lead Them All"	2:16
14.	"The Power of Patty Compels You"	2:16
15.	"The Fourth Cataclysm"	3:32
16.	"Balloon Parade"	1:58
17.	"Battle of Times Square"	3:20
18.	"Entering The Mercado"	2:31
19.	"Behemoth"	3:43
20.	"Into The Portal"	3:07
21.	"NY Heart GB"	0:49
Total length:		51:27

=== Reception ===
Reviewing the score, Filmtracks.com wrote "This music is not the Ghostbusters we know and love. It's simply a really solid parody score by a competent composer who needs to branch out into more genres. If you can tune out the history of the franchise and appreciate Shapiro's Ghostbusters as a standalone entity, then you'll enjoy the work. If you love the history of the concept, though, you'll be left with a sour taste in your mouth that only Slimer would be proud of." Tony Black of Flickering Myth summarised "A fun, sometimes thrilling, occasionally creepy score which elevates the comedy stylistics on screen nicely, and while you may still always remember Ghostbusters for the theme tune, don't write off this orchestral piece too quickly."
