= Elle King discography =

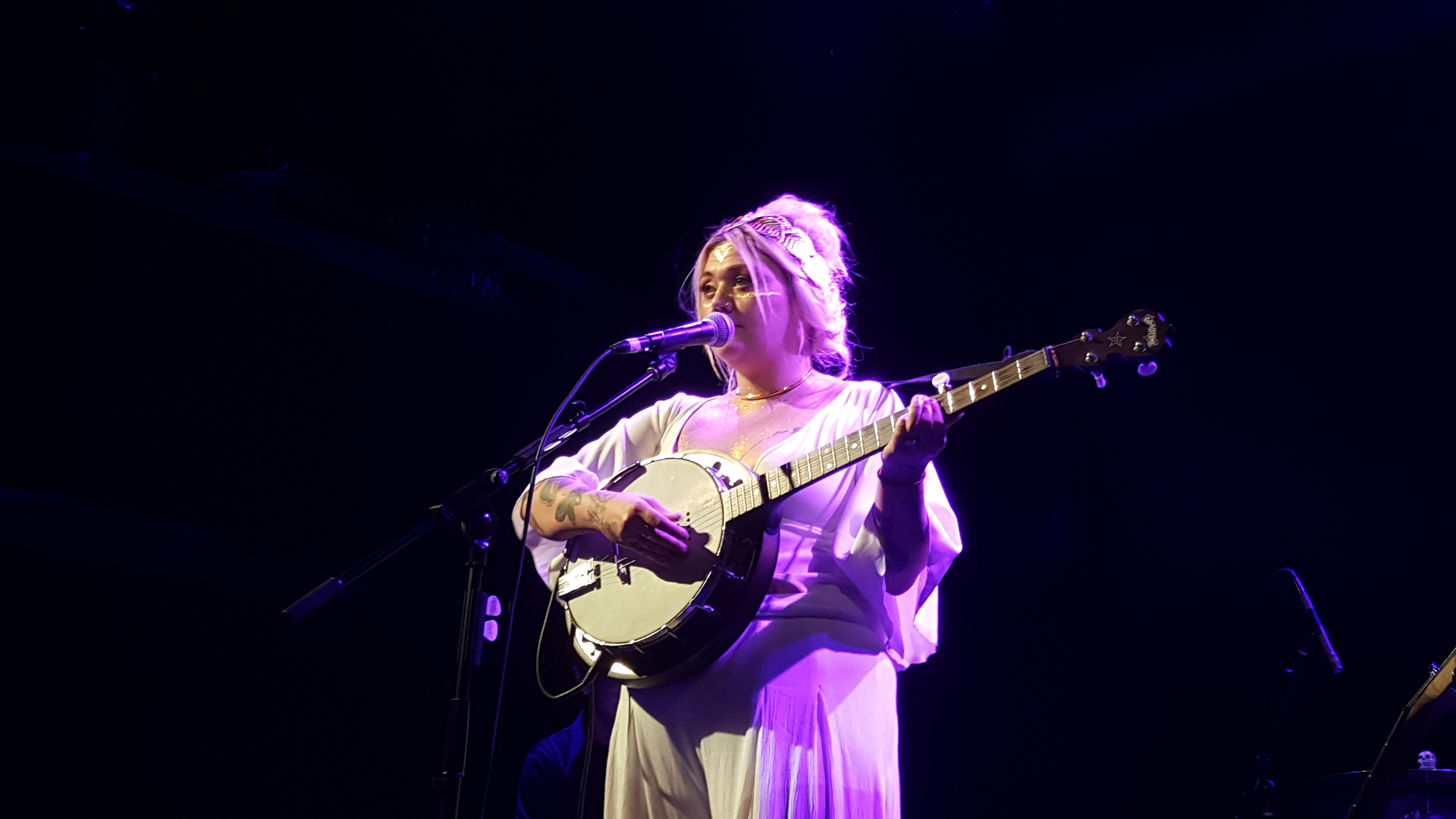
- Elle King performs at the Bowery Ballroom in Manhattan.
- Studio albums: 3
- EPs: 2
- Singles: 20
- Music videos: 8
- Promotional singles: 5

American singer and songwriter Elle King has released three studio albums, one extended play, 17 singles (including four as a featured artist), five promotional singles, eight music videos, and other album appearances. In 2012, King released her debut EP, The Elle King EP, on RCA and Fat Possum Records. The EP track "Playing for Keeps" is the theme song for VH1's Mob Wives Chicago series. She released her debut album, Love Stuff on February 17, 2015. The album produced the US top 10 single "Ex's & Oh's", which earned her two Grammy nominations. In 2016, King contributed the single "Good Girls" to the Ghostbusters soundtrack. In February 2017, King announced via Instagram that she was working on her second studio album at Redwood Studio in Denton, Texas. She released her second studio album, Shake the Spirit, on October 19, 2018. In 2022, she featured on a remix of Canadian rapper Dax's single "Dear Alcohol". She released her third studio album, Come Get Your Wife, on January 27, 2023.

== Studio albums ==
List of albums, with selected chart positions and certifications
Title	Album details	Peak chart positions										Certifications
Title	Album details	US	AUS	AUT	CAN	GER	IRL	NZ	SCO	SWE	UK	Certifications
Love Stuff	Released: February 17, 2015; Formats: CD, digital download, vinyl; Label: RCA	26	11	29	7	45	31	15	8	55	18	RIAA: Platinum; BPI: Silver; MC: Gold
Shake the Spirit	Released: October 19, 2018; Formats: CD, vinyl, digital download, streaming; Label: RCA	68	—	—	67	—	—	—	47	—	— (Note: Shake the Spirit did not enter the UK Albums Chart, but peaked at number 33 on the UK Official Album Downloads Chart.)	
Come Get Your Wife	Released: January 27, 2023; Formats: CD, vinyl, digital download, streaming; Label: RCA	53	—	—	—	—	—	—	—	—	— (Note: Come Get Your Wife did not enter the UK Albums Chart, but peaked at number 26 on the UK Official Album Downloads Chart.)	
"—" denotes releases that did not chart or were not released in that territory.

== Extended plays ==
List of extended plays, with selected chart positions
Title	Details	Peak chart positions
Title	Details	US Heat.
The Elle King EP	Released: June 12, 2012; Formats: CD, digital download; Label: RCA	34
In Isolation	Released: July 10, 2020; Formats: CD, digital download; Label: RCA	— (Note: Since her debut album charted within the top 100 of the Billboard 200, all of her subsequent releases are ineligible for the Heatseekers chart.)

== Singles ==
=== As lead artist ===
List of singles, with selected chart positions and certifications
Title	Year	Peak chart positions										Certifications	Album
Title	Year	US	US Rock	AUS	CAN	GER	IRL	MEX	NZ	UK	WW	Certifications	Album
"Ex's & Oh's"	2014	10	1	5	14	10	28	6	10	15	11	RIAA: 4× Platinum; ARIA: 2× Platinum; BPI: Platinum; BVMI: Gold; IFPI DK: Platinum; MC: 5× Platinum; RMNZ: 2× Platinum	Love Stuff
"Catch Us If You Can"	2015	—	—	—	—	—	—	—	—	—	—		Non-album singles
"American Girl"	2015	—	—	—	—	—	—	—	—	—	—		Non-album singles
"Under the Influence"	2015	—	47	—	—	—	—	—	—	—	—		Love Stuff
"America's Sweetheart"	2016	— (Note: "America's Sweetheart" did not enter the Billboard Hot 100, but did peak at number 14 on the Bubbling Under Hot 100 Singles chart which acts as a 25-song extension.)	10	—	— (Note: "America's Sweetheart" did not enter the Billboard Canadian Hot 100, but peaked at number 15 on the Canadian Digital Song Sales chart.)	—	—	—	—	—	—	RIAA: Gold; MC: Platinum	Love Stuff
"Good Girls"	2016	—	29	—	—	—	—	—	—	—	—		Ghostbusters
"Wild Love"	2017	—	31	—	—	—	—	—	—	—	—		Non-album single
"Shame"	2018	—	22	—	—	—	—	— (Note: "Shame" did not enter the Mexico Airplay chart, but peaked at number 44 on the Mexico Ingles Airplay chart.)	—	—	—		Shake the Spirit
"Baby Outlaw"	2018	—	— (Note: "Baby Outlaw" did not enter the Rock Songs chart, but peaked at number 2 on the Rock Digital Song Sales chart.)	—	—	—	—	—	—	— (Note: "Baby Outlaw" did not enter the UK Singles Chart, but peaked at number 82 on the UK Singles Sales Chart.)	—		Shake the Spirit
"Under the Mistletoe" (with Ronnie Spector)	2019	—	—	—	—	—	—	—	—	—	—		Non-album singles
"Best of You" (with Andy Grammer)	2020	— (Note: "Best of You" did not enter the Billboard Hot 100, but peaked at number 39 on the Digital Song Sales chart.)	—	—	—	—	—	—	—	—	—		Non-album singles
"The Let Go"	2020	—	— (Note: "The Let Go" did not enter the Rock Songs chart, but peaked at number 37 on the Rock Airplay chart.)	—	—	—	—	—	—	—	—		In Isolation
"Another You"	2020	—	—	—	—	—	—	—	—	—	—		Non-album single
"Drunk (And I Don't Wanna Go Home)" (with Miranda Lambert)	2021	37 (Note: "Drunk (And I Don't Wanna Go Home)" also reached number one on the Billboard Country Airplay chart.)	4	— (Note: "Drunk (And I Don't Wanna Go Home)" did not enter the Australian ARIA Singles Chart but peaked at number 16 on the ARIA Digital Track Chart.)	73	—	—	—	—	—	193	RIAA: Platinum; MC: 2× Platinum; RMNZ: Gold	Come Get Your Wife
"Please Come Home for Christmas"	2021	—	33	—	—	—	—	—	—	—	—		Non-album single
"Worth a Shot" (featuring Dierks Bentley)	2022	— (Note: "Worth a Shot" did not enter the Billboard Hot 100, but peaked at number 30 on the Digital Song Sales chart.)	—	—	—	—	—	—	—	—	—	RIAA: Gold	Come Get Your Wife
"Honky Tonk Disco Nights" (with Nile Rodgers)	2022	—	—	—	—	—	—	—	—	—	—		Non-album single
"Jersey Giant"	2023	—	— (Note: "Jersey Giant" did not enter the Hot Rock & Alternative Songs chart, but peaked at number 39 on the Triple A Airplay chart.)	—	—	—	—	—	—	—	—		Come Get Your Wife
"Baby Daddy's Weekend"	2024	—	—	—	—	—	—	—	—	—	—		TBA
"High Road"	2024	—	—	—	—	—	—	—	—	—	—		TBA
"Let's Ride Away" (with Avicii)	2025	—	—	—	—	—	—	—	— (Note: "Let's Ride Away" did not enter the NZ Top 40 Singles Chart, but peaked at number 20 on the NZ Hot Singles Chart.)	—	—		Avicii Forever
"—" denotes releases that did not chart or were not released in that territory.

=== As featured artist ===
List of singles, with selected chart positions and certifications
Song	Year	Peak chart positions										Certifications	Album
Song	Year	US	US Adult	US Country	US Rock	AUS	BEL (FL)	BEL (WA)	CAN	CAN Pop	CZ	Certifications	Album
"I Don't Mind" (Epick featuring Elle King)	2013	—	—	—	—	—	—	—	—	—	—		non-album single
"Different for Girls" (Dierks Bentley featuring Elle King)	2016	42	—	3	—	—	—	—	49	—	—	RIAA: Platinum; MC: Platinum	Black
"Not Easy" (Alex Da Kid featuring X Ambassadors, Elle King and Wiz Khalifa)	2016	— (Note: "Not Easy" did not enter the Billboard Hot 100, but peaked at number 36 on the Digital Song Sales chart.)	34	—	10	73	37	44	—	41	31		non-album single
"The Upside" (Lindsey Stirling featuring Elle King)	2019	—	—	—	—	—	—	—	—	—	—		Artemis
"Fooled Around and Fell in Love" (Miranda Lambert featuring Maren Morris, Ashley McBryde, Tenille Townes, Caylee Hammack, and Elle King)	2019	— (Note: "Fooled Around and Fell in Love" did not enter the Billboard Hot 100, but peaked at number 25 on the Digital Song Sales chart.)	—	47	—	—	—	—	—	—	—		non-album single
"Who Am I" (Needtobreathe featuring Elle King)	2020	—	—	—	—	—	—	—	—	—	—		Out of Body
"Companion" (The Night Game featuring Elle King)	2020	—	—	—	—	—	—	—	—	—	—		Beautiful Stranger EP
"Two Shots" (Wanda Jackson featuring Elle King and Joan Jett)	2021	—	—	—	—	—	—	—	—	—	—		Encore
"—" denotes releases that did not chart or were not released in that territory.

=== Promotional singles ===
List of singles, with selected chart positions and certifications
Song	Year	Peak chart positions		Album
Song	Year	US Alt DL	SWI Air	Album
"Good to Be a Man"	2012	—	—	The Elle King EP
"Playing for Keeps"	2012	—	66	The Elle King EP
"Good Thing Gone"	2018	25	—	Shake The Spirit
"Out Yonder"	2022	—	—	Come Get Your Wife
"Feelin' Alright"	2022	—	—	The Bad Guys
"I Know Where I've Been"	2022	—	—	Luckiest Girl Alive
"Try Jesus"	2022	—	—	Come Get Your Wife
"Tulsa"	2023	—	—	Come Get Your Wife
"—" denotes releases that did not chart or were not released in that territory.

== Other charted songs ==
List of singles, with selected chart positions and certifications
Song	Year	Peak chart positions		Album
Song	Year	US Alt DL	US Rock DL	Album
"My Neck, My Back"	2012	20	22	The Elle King EP
"Ain't Gonna Drown"	2020	12	8	Love Stuff

== Other appearances ==
List of singles
Song	Year	Other(s) artist(s)	Album
"Ain't Gonna Drown"	2015	—N/a	Broadcasts Vol. 23
"The Will of the River"	2015	Darren Hanlon	Where Did You Come From?
"Reckless Love"	2015	Bleachers	Terrible Thrills, Vol. 2
"Different for Girls"	2016	Dierks Bentley	Black
"Good Girls"	2016	—N/a	Ghostbusters (Original Motion Picture Soundtrack)
"Dear Alcohol"	2023	Dax	What is Life?

== Music videos ==
List of music videos, showing year released and director
Title	Year	Director
"Good to Be a Man"	2013	Matt Sukkar
"Ex's & Oh's"	2015	Michael Maxxis
"America's Sweetheart"	2016	Brian Welsh
"Under the Influence"	2016	Lior Molcho
"Different for Girls" (Dierks Bentley featuring Elle King)	2016	Wes Edwards
"Good Girls"	2016	Dano Cerny
"Shame"	2018	Dano Cerny
"Fooled Around and Fell in Love"(Miranda Lambert & Friends)	2019	Michael Monaco
