= America's sweetheart =

America's sweetheart may refer to:

== Film and theatre ==
- America's Sweetheart (musical), a Rodgers and Hart musical
- America's Sweethearts, a 2001 film

== Music ==
- America's Sweetheart (Courtney Love album), 2004
- "America's Sweetheart" (song), a song from the Elle King album Love Stuff
- America's Sweetheart, a 2020 album by Chanel West Coast

== Other uses ==
- America's Sweetheart, a nickname of singer Taylor Swift
- America's Sweetheart, a nickname of actress Mary Pickford
- America's Sweethearts, a nickname of the Dallas Cowboys Cheerleaders
