= Shake the Spirit =

Studio album by Elle King
- Released: October 19, 2018
- Length: 50:28
- Label: RCA
- Producers: Elle King; Matt Pence; Greg Kurstin; Tim Pagnotta

Elle King chronology
Love Stuff (2015)	Shake the Spirit (2018)	Come Get Your Wife (2023)

Singles from Shake the Spirit
- 1. "Shame" Released: August 10, 2018; 2. "Baby Outlaw" Released: December 4, 2018

Shake the Spirit is the second studio album by American singer Elle King, released on October 19, 2018 by RCA Records. It was recorded in Denton, Texas.

Commercially, Shake the Spirit peaked at No. 9 on the US Top Rock Albums (Billboard) and No. 6 on the US Top Alternative Albums (Billboard).

Upon the album's release it received critical acclaim from music critics. Many stated since King's global success with "Ex's and Oh's" it proves that she has much more to offer, stating it is infused with "divorce, self-doubt, medicinal drinking, and PTSD," all of which King suffered in her personal life after being in the spotlight.

== Music ==
Variety described Shake the Spirit as "confessional rock and roll". Billboard said it is "a cathartic, rough-edged diary entry of a project that couldn't be more personal".

== Critical reception ==
Professional ratings
Aggregate scores
Source	Rating
Metacritic	76/100
Review scores
Source	Rating
AllMusic	3.5/5 stars
Paste	6.5/10

Chris Willman of Variety called the album "a first-rate second album that deals frankly with a rough year or two the singer has had since "Ex's and Oh's" took her big-time. It's infused with divorce, self-doubt, medicinal drinking, PTSD and, well, more divorce." Eric R. Danton of Paste said the album "plays like a kind of musical revue, with nods at muscular rock, old-school spy movie songs, vintage soul, '60s girl groups and tunes that blend elements of all four", but that they do not "hang together as a group, which gives Shake the Spirit a scattershot feel. It's an Elle King album, to be sure—her voice is what stitches these songs together, though what is probably supposed to be evidence of her range often feels like she's trying on musical costumes. The result is a lack of cohesion that turns Shake the Spirit into a series of genre exercises."

== Track listing ==
No.	Title	Writer(s)	Producer(s)	Length
1.	"Talk of the Town"	Elle King; Joey McClellan; Paul DeVincenzo; Dave Scalia; Cameron Neal	King; DeVincenzo	3:36
2.	"Baby Outlaw"	King; Greg Kurstin	Kurstin	3:19
3.	"Shame"	King; Tim Pagnotta	Pagnotta; Brian Phillips (co.)	2:39
4.	"Man's Man"	King; Rebecca Lovell; Megan Lovell	King; Matt Pence	2:48
5.	"Naturally Pretty Girls"	King; Ben Gibbard	King	3:13
6.	"Told You So"	King	King	2:39
7.	"Good Thing Gone"	King; McClellan; DeVincenzo; Scalia; Jesse Gibbon	King; Pence	4:52
8.	"Runaway"	King; Kurstin	Kurstin	4:26
9.	"It Girl"	King; McClellan; DeVincenzo; Scalia; Neal; Gibbon; Jason Frederick	King; Pence	3:42
10.	"Ram Jam"	King; McClellan; DeVincenzo; Scalia	King; Pence	4:06
11.	"Sober"	King; McClellan; DeVincenzo; Scalia; Neal; Gibbon; R. Lovell; M. Lovell; Elliott Jacobsen	King; Pence	4:25
12.	"Chained" (featuring Cameron Neal)	King; Neal	King; Pence	4:10
13.	"Little Bit of Lovin'"	King	King; Pence	6:33
Total length:				50:28

== Personnel ==
Adapted credits from the liner notes of Shake the Spirit.

Vocals

- Lead vocals – Elle King, Cameron Neal
- Background vocals – Denton Choir, Paul DeVincenzo, Jesse Gibbon, Joey McClellan, Cameron Neal, Cherish Robinson, Dave Scalia
- Gang vocals – Tim Pagnotta, Brian Phillips

Instruments

- Alto, Tenor, Flute and Clarinet – David Monsch
- Bari Sax – Mike Morisson
- Bass – Paul DeVincenzo, Elle King, Greg Kurstin, Brian Phillips, Paul Unger
- Cellos – Shawna Hamilton, Buffi Jacobs
- Drums and percussion – Elliott Jacobson, Elle King, Greg Kurstin, Dave Scalia
- Guitars – Elle King, Greg Kurstin, Rebecca Lovell, Joey McClellan, Cameron Neal, Tim Pagnotta
- Keyboards – Jesse Gibbon, Brian Phillips
- Lap Steel – Elle King, Megan Lovell
- Trombone – David J. Piere
- Violins – Catherine Price Allain, Anne Bonnett, Arthur Busby, Ordabek Duissen, Steven Li, Amy Faires Lin, Swang Lin (Concertmaster), Florence Wang

Production

- A&R – Keith Naftaly
- Engineering – Julian Burg, Paul DeVincenzo, Greg Kurstin, Alex Pasco, Brian Phillips
- Mastering – Ryan Smith, Stephen Marcussen ("Baby Outlaw")
- Mixing – Neal Avron, Michael H. Brauer, Tony Hoffer, Dave Rowland, Mark "Spike" Stent
- Mixing assistant – Micheal Freeman, Scott Skrzynski, Steve Vealey
- Producer – Elle King, Greg Kurstin, Tim Pagnotta, Matt Pence

Imagery

- Art director – Meghan Foley
- Creative producer – Tyler Morgan
- Hair – Marwa Basihr
- Makeup – Michelle Clark
- Photography – Dennis Leupold
- Stylists – Dani + Emma

== Charts ==
Chart (2018)	Peak position
Canadian Albums (Billboard)	67
Scottish Albums (Official Charts)	47
US Billboard 200	68
US Top Alternative Albums (Billboard)	6
US Top Rock Albums (Billboard)	9
