= Worth a Shot (Elle King song) =

Single by Elle King featuring Dierks Bentley

from the album Come Get Your Wife
- Released: June 6, 2022
- Genre: Country
- Length: 3:32
- Label: RCA
- Songwriters: Shane McAnally; Josh Osborne; Ross Copperman
- Producers: Elle King; Ross Copperman

Elle King singles chronology
"Drunk (And I Don't Wanna Go Home)" (2021)	"Worth a Shot" (2022)	"Jersey Giant" (2023)

Dierks Bentley singles chronology
"New Old Trucks" (2021)	"Worth a Shot" (2022)	"Gold" (2022)

Music video
- "Worth a Shot" on YouTube

"Worth a Shot" is a song written by Shane McAnally, Josh Osborne, and Ross Copperman, and recorded by American singer Elle King. It was released on June 6, 2022, as the second single from King's third studio album, Come Get Your Wife. Dierks Bentley is featured on the song, marking the second collaboration between the two singers, after King previously featured on Bentley's "Different for Girls" from his 2016 album, Black.

== Background and composition ==
"Worth a Shot" was written by Shane McAnally, Josh Osborne, and Ross Copperman, and initially cut by Dierks Bentley as a solo track. Bentley offered it to King, who suggested they turn the song into a duet.

== Music video ==
The music video for "Worth a Shot" premiered on May 18, 2022, and depicts a Wild West theme, with Bentley portraying a wanted man getting rowdy in a saloon and King playing the part of his wife who dons a male disguise to challenge him to a drinking contest, before the sheriff catches up to Bentley and King has to help him flee. Directed by Stephen Kinigopoulos and Alexa Stone, King developed the concept for the video, and it was shot in Murfreesboro, Tennessee.

== Charts ==
Weekly chart performance for "Worth a Shot"
Chart (2022–2023)	Peak position
Canada Country (Billboard)	40
US Country Airplay (Billboard)	38
US Hot Country Songs (Billboard)	42
