= Under the Influence (Elle King song) =

Single by Elle King

from the album Love Stuff
- Released: December 14, 2015
- Recorded: 2014
- Genre: Rock; soul; R&B
- Length: 3:17
- Label: RCA
- Songwriters: Elle King; Dave Bassett
- Producer: Dave Bassett

Elle King singles chronology
"Ex's & Oh's" (2014)	"Under the Influence" (2015)	"America's Sweetheart" (2016)

"Under the Influence" is a song co-written and recorded by American singer and songwriter Elle King for her debut studio album, Love Stuff (2015). The song was first released to digital retailers on December 9, 2014 through RCA Records as a promotional single and was serviced to American Triple A radio December 14, 2015 as the album's second official single. As of January 2016, the song has become King's second top-3 hit on the Adult Alternative Songs chart. The music video for "Under The Influence" was released on April 28, 2016. In March 2015 it was used as a promotional song for TCM over older movie clips.

== Composition ==
"Under the Influence" was written by Elle King and the song's producer, Dave Bassett, about the challenge of being in love with someone who is no good for you. The lyrics relate this toxic relationship to substance abuse, with the narrator describing herself as being "under the influence" of her significant other. Stephen Thomas Erlewine of AllMusic wrote that King "walks a fine line between rock crunch and soul testifying" on this and other album tracks, while Diffuser noted a "soulful swagger" in the delivery and Kitty Empire of The Guardian described the song's sound as "slinky R&B".

== Live performances ==
King performed "Ex's & Oh's" and "Under the Influence" as the musical guest on the episode of Jimmy Kimmel Live! airing October 26, 2015.

== Commercial reception ==
"Under the Influence" debuted on the Billboard Alternative Songs airplay chart at number 40 in December 2015 and has since reached a peak position of 17. The song has also reached number three on the Billboard Adult Alternative Songs (or Triple A) airplay chart, her second consecutive top-tier single after "Ex's & Oh's". It has charted on the magazine's Rock Airplay chart, which monitors airplay from all rock formats including the aforementioned, at number 22 and on the Hot Rock Songs chart at 47.

In Canada, the song has reached a peak position of 33 on the Billboard Canada Rock airplay chart, which follows a similar methodology to Rock Airplay.

== Charts ==
=== Weekly charts ===
Chart (2015–2016)	Peak position
Canada Rock (Billboard)	33
Iceland (RÚV)	1
US Alternative Airplay (Billboard)	17
US Hot Rock & Alternative Songs (Billboard)	47
US Rock & Alternative Airplay (Billboard)	22

=== Year end charts ===
Chart (2016)	Position
US Adult Alternative Songs (Billboard)	21

== Release history ==
Country	Date	Format	Ref.
United States	December 9, 2014	Digital download	
United States	December 14, 2015	Adult album alternative	
United States	December 15, 2015	Modern rock	
