= Joker (Dax song) =

Single by Dax
- Released: May 6, 2020
- Genre: Rap
- Length: 4:07
- Label: Living Legends Entertainment
- Songwriters: Daniel Nwosu Jr. (a.k.a. Dax); Alex Nour
- Composers: Dax; Nour
- Producer: Nour

Dax singles chronology
| "Book of Revelations" (2020) | "Joker" (2020) | "Black Lives Matter" (2020) |

"Joker" (stylized in all caps) is a single by Canadian rapper Dax. The song was released on May 6, 2020, along with an accompanied music video.

== Background ==
"Joker" addresses themes of mental health and cyberbullying, exploring the psychological and emotional effects of online harassment. Using the persona of the DC Comics character the Joker, specifically the version portrayed by Joaquin Phoenix in Todd Phillips' 2019 film Joker, Dax delivers introspective lyrics that depict the internal struggles associated with bullying, including feelings of isolation and emotional distress. Over the course of the song, his performance becomes increasingly intense and theatrical, emphasizing the emotional toll of sustained criticism and the challenges faced by individuals coping with harassment-related trauma.

== Music video ==
Released on May 6, 2020, the music video was shot by Logan Meis. The official music video for "Joker" features thematic visuals illustrating the song's commentary on cyberbullying and online harassment. It combines quieter, atmospheric opening imagery with more intense performance shots as the narrative progresses. Dax is depicted in character alongside visual elements that emphasize the emotional and psychological themes of the song, with production choices that include piano elements and prominent bass lines aligning with the track's mood.

== Reception ==
"Joker" did not receive coverage from major music publications. On May 19, 2020, Dax posted on X (formerly Twitter) that Todd Phillips, the director of the 2019 Joker film, had seen the music video and reacted positively. (Note: "WOW... Can't believe the award winning director of the actual JOKER movie Todd Phillips saw my video and showed love. Validation to the highest degree. God is good. "JOKER" is legendary. Let's keep spreading the word!". X.) According to HotNewHipHop, "Joker" exemplifies a style of rap described as "co-worker music," characterized by over-the-top delivery and straightforward, literal lyrics rather than metaphors or allegories. The article notes that lines such as "You’re insane, you’re in pain, I can tell by what you’re saying" and "You leave a negative comment not knowing what you sow you will reap / I bet you smile when you post thinking you’re hurting me" are relatable, but may be considered simplistic or overly direct by some listeners.

== Personnel ==
Credits adapted from YouTube.

- Daniel Nwosu – Composer, writer
- Alex Nour – Composer, writer, producer

== Charts ==
Weekly chart performance for "Joker"
| Chart (2020) | Peak position |
|---|---|
| UK Video Streaming (Official Charts) | 32 |

== Sequel ==
A follow‑up song, “Joker Returns,” was released later in the same year and continues the exploration of bullying and its psychological effects introduced in "Joker." According to Glasse Factory, the track features a theatrical music video and lyrical content that depicts the emotional aftermath of bullying, presenting a narrative of a man mentally scarred by harsh treatment and societal judgement.

== In popular culture ==
The Joker Open Verse Challenge is a TikTok duet trend created by Dax, in which participants are invited to record rap verses over an instrumental beat produced by the creator.

"Clock Strikes 12, Midnight Arrives" is an internet meme referring to the opening lyric of a 2022 TikTok duet created as part of the Joker Open Verse Challenge. The line was performed by TikTok user Ellie Shaw, who rapped the verse in a pronounced British accent, speaking from the perspective of the Joker encouraging his followers to kill his archenemy, Batman. The clip experienced renewed attention in 2025 after TikTok user @fishman_records3 posted a stitch reacting to the opening lyric. This reaction contributed to the video's spread as an internet meme, leading to its use in animation memes and as an exploitable element in remix-style content. At the time of its release, Dax responded positively to Shaw's submission, posting a duet in which he reacted favorably to her lyrics and delivery. In the accompanying caption, Dax suggested that Shaw pursue voice acting, praising her vocal performance.
