= Love Stuff =

Studio album by Elle King
- Released: February 13, 2015
- Genres: Blues; country; rock
- Length: 42:26
- Label: RCA
- Producers: John Hill; Dave Bassett; Jeff Bhasker; Martin Johnson; Jacknife Lee; Eg White

Elle King chronology
The Elle King EP (2012)	Love Stuff (2015)	Shake the Spirit (2018)

Singles from Love Stuff
- 1. "Ex's & Oh's" Released: September 23, 2014; 2. "Under the Influence" Released: December 14, 2015; 3. "America's Sweetheart" Released: February 8, 2016

Love Stuff is the debut studio album by American singer and songwriter Elle King, released in the United States on February 13, 2015, by RCA Records.It was mastered in Hollywood, California at Stephen Marcussen's namesake recording studio.

The album was preceded by its lead single "Ex's & Oh's", which was released on September 23, 2014, peaked at number ten on the Billboard Hot 100, and received quadruple platinum certification by the RIAA. Additionally, the song peaked the Alternative Songs chart in September 2015, becoming only the second song by a female solo act to do so since 1996 after Lorde achieved the feat in 2013 with "Royals". It was also preceded by the promotional single "Under the Influence". The album's second single, "America's Sweetheart", peaked at number ten on Billboard's Hot Rock & Alternative Songs chart — becoming her second song to do so — and has since been certified platinum by Music Canada.

Commercially the album peaked at number 26 on the Billboard 200, and received a platinum certification by the Recording Industry Association of America (RIAA), and was generally praised by music critics. The album also made history by being the first album to debut atop the UK Americana chart, which launched on 28 January 2016. It also was placed No. 2 on UK Biggest Americana Albums of 2016.

== Composition ==
Love Stuff intertwines blues, country and rock with elements of folk, gospel, R&B, and punk-pop.

== Singles ==
"Ex's & Oh's" was released on September 23, 2014, as the album's lead single. It first found success in the rock genre, where it became the second song by a solo female artist in the past twenty years to reach the top position of the Billboard Alternative Songs airplay chart and led the magazine's Hot Rock Songs chart for 10 consecutive weeks in mid-2015. The song later crossed over to a mainstream audience and became a number-one hit on the Adult Pop Songs chart in addition to spending one week in the top 10 of the all-genre Billboard Hot 100. "Ex's & Oh's" received two nominations at the 58th Grammy Awards: for Best Rock Performance and Best Rock Song.

The second rock single from the album is "Under the Influence", released to AAA radio on December 14, 2015 modern rock radio on December 15.

"America's Sweetheart" was released on February 8, 2016, as the second mainstream single and third overall released from Love Stuff; it impacted American hot adult contemporary radio on that date.

== Critical reception ==
Professional ratings
Review scores
Source	Rating
AllMusic	3/5 stars
Renowned for Sound	4.5/5 stars

Marcus Floyd from Renowned for Sound was impressed by King's "sonically versatile qualities" in her vocal performance over the track listing and the lyrical content she co-wrote with her collaborators, saying that "it’s great to hear less clichéd written tracks, replaced by personal pieces that tell a story and relive an experience." He concluded that King's career was just beginning, saying that "with her debut album now under her belt, she seems capable of anything; we can’t wait to hear more from this girl." AllMusic's Stephen Thomas Erlewine was critical of King's vocals feeling exhaustive throughout the album as she keeps up her chosen image but gave praise to her performances on "Ex's & Oh's", "Under the Influence", "Last Damn Night" and "Jackson" for finding a balance between "rock crunch and soul testifying," concluding that "Such highlights suggests that when [Elle] King doesn't have to try so hard to prove her bona fides, she might wind up with a record that's hard to deny. For now, she merely has a promising debut on her hands."

== Track listing ==
No.	Title	Writer(s)	Producer	Length
1.	"Where the Devil Don't Go"	Elle King; Brandon Lowry	John Hill	3:01
2.	"Ex's & Oh's"	King; Dave Bassett	Dave Bassett	3:22
3.	"Under the Influence"	King; Bassett	Bassett	3:18
4.	"Last Damn Night"	King; Jeff Bhasker; Mark Ronson; Patrick Carney	Jeff Bhasker	4:02
5.	"Kocaine Karolina"	King; Bhasker	Bhasker	3:59
6.	"Song of Sorrow"	King	Hill	3:35
7.	"America's Sweetheart"	King; Martin Johnson	Martin Johnson	4:06
8.	"I Told You I Was Mean"	King	Jacknife Lee	4:31
9.	"Ain't Gonna Drown"	King; Bhasker	Bhasker	3:21
10.	"Jackson"	King; Amanda Ghost; Dave McCracken; Felipe Aparicio	Lee	3:14
11.	"Make You Smile"	King; Garret "Jacknife" Lee	Lee	2:31
12.	"See You Again"	King; Francis White	Eg White	3:26
Total length:				42:26

Japan bonus tracks
No.	Title	Writer(s)	Producer	Length
13.	"Playing for Keeps"	King, Chris DeStefano	Chris DeStefano	3:37
14.	"Good to Be a Man"	King	Andy Baldwin	2:48
15.	"No One Can Save You"	King		2:14
16.	"My Neck, My Back (Live)"	Khia Chambers, Michael J. Williams, Ed Meriwether		2:40
Total length:				53:45

== Personnel ==
Adapted from AllMusic:

Vocals

- Lead vocals – Elle King, Jacknife Lee
- Background vocals – Zach Carothers, Scarlet Cherry, John Gourley, Martin Johnson, Tyler Sam Johnson, Elle King, Phillip Lawrence, Kyle O'Quin, Alisan Porter

Instruments

- Banjo – Elle King
- Bass – Dave Bassett, Jacknife Lee, Brandon Paddock, Mark Ronson, Sebastian Steinberg
- Bouzouki – Blake Mills
- Drums, percussion, and beats – Dave Bassett, Sam Bell, Jeff Bhasker, Patrick Carney, Zach Carothers, James Gadson, John Gourley, John Hill, Martin Johnson, Patrick Keeler, Elle King, Jacknife Lee, Kyle O'Quin, Darren Weiss
- Guitars – Dave Bassett, Martin Johnson, Elle King, Jacknife Lee, Blake Mills, Hunter Perrin, Mark Ronson, Eg White
- Keyboards – Dave Bassett, Jeff Bhasker, John Hill, Jacknife Lee
- Organ – Jeff Bhasker, Jacknife Lee, Jamie Muhoberac, Kyle O'Quin
- Piano – Jeff Bhasker, Martin Johnson, Jacknife Lee, Jamie Muhoberac, Kyle O'Quin, Brandon Paddock
- Synthesizer – John Hill

Production

- A&R – Peter Edge, David Wolter
- Assistant – Marcus Johnson, Kyle Moorman, Alex Salibian, Joe Visciano
- Digital editing – Chris Bernard, Matt Bishop
- Engineering – Dave Bassett, Sam Bell, Mark Bengtson, Matt Bishop, Doug Boehm, Tyler Sam Johnson, Jacknife Lee, Matt Ross, Alex Salibian, Pawel Sek, Laura Sisk, Eg White
- Mastering – Stephen Marcussen
- Mixing – Jeff Bhasker, Michael H. Brauer, Tom Elmhirst, Martin Johnson, Vance Powell, Alex Salibian, Eg White
- Mixing assistant – Mark Bengtson
- Producer – Dave Bassett, Jeff Bhasker, John Hill, Martin Johnson, Jacknife Lee, Eg White
- Production assistant – Ben Baptie, Tyler Sam Johnson, Brandon Paddock
- Programming – John Hill, Martin Johnson, Kyle Moorman, Brandon Paddock

Imagery

- Art direction – Erwin Gorostiza, Michelle Holme
- Design – Michelle Holme
- Photography – Dustin Cohen

== Charts ==
=== Weekly charts ===
Chart (2015–2016)	Peak position
Australian Albums (ARIA)	11
Austrian Albums (Ö3 Austria)	29
Canadian Albums (Billboard)	7
Danish Albums (Hitlisten)	22
German Albums (Offizielle Top 100)	45
Irish Albums (IRMA)	31
New Zealand Albums (RMNZ)	15
Scottish Albums (Official Charts)	8
Swedish Albums (Sverigetopplistan)	55
UK Albums (Official Charts)	18
UK Americana (OCC)	1
US Billboard 200	26
US Top Rock Albums (Billboard)	3
US Top Alternative Albums (Billboard)	2

=== Year-end charts ===
Chart (2015)	Position
US Billboard 200	121
US Top Rock Albums (Billboard)	25
Chart (2016)	Position
Australian Albums (ARIA)	90
UK Americana (OCC)	2
US Billboard 200	91
US Top Rock Albums (Billboard)	15

== Certifications ==
Region	Certification	Certified units/sales
Canada (Music Canada)	Gold	40,000^{^}
New Zealand (RMNZ)	Gold	7,500^{‡}
United Kingdom (BPI)	Silver	60,000^{‡}
United States (RIAA)	Platinum	1,000,000^{‡}
^{^} Shipments figures based on certification alone.^{‡} Sales+streaming figures based on certification alone.
