= Come Get Your Wife =

Studio album by Elle King
- Released: January 27, 2023
- Recorded: Nashville, Tennessee
- Genre: Country
- Length: 44:46
- Label: RCA
- Producers: Ross Copperman; Elle King; Martin Johnson; Brandon Paddock

Elle King chronology
Shake the Spirit (2018)	Come Get Your Wife (2023)

Singles from Come Get Your Wife
- 1. "Drunk (And I Don't Wanna Go Home)" Released: February 26, 2021; 2. "Worth a Shot" Released: June 6, 2022; 3. "Jersey Giant" Released: May 22, 2023

Come Get Your Wife is the third studio album by American singer-songwriter and musician Elle King, released on January 27, 2023, by RCA Records. Co-produced by King and Ross Copperman, it is King's first album since 2018's Shake the Spirit. King co-wrote eight of the album's thirteen tracks.

The album was preceded by the singles "Drunk (And I Don't Wanna Go Home)" and "Worth a Shot". The former of which reached number one on the Country Airplay chart, becoming the first female duet to reach the top of the charts in almost thirty years following Reba McEntire and Linda Davis' "Does He Love You" in 1993.

Come Get Your Wife debuted at number 53 on the US Billboard 200 and number 11 on the Top Country Albums charts with 13,000 album-equivalent units.

== Background ==
King revealed that the title came from a phrase that country singer Chris Young shouted to her partner while they were competing in "wild bar games" while filming the show Barmageddon and quipped "Thanks for the album title, babe" in the Instagram caption, alongside the statement "Each track comes from influences of all genres, and I now know country music is where I belong." Discussing the project, she explained "This whole album is a crazy quilt of all sorts of moments and things that might not seem to go together, but because they're me, they do. It's very Southern Ohio, very who we are - and very much a lot of people who are just like me, because I know they're out there."

When discussing the genesis of the album, King explained that, following the success of the single "Drunk (And I Don't Wanna Go Home)", King's team explained that she would have to commit to a full-blown country album if she wanted to maintain the same level of success and radio play in the genre, which initially worried her, as she had just finished recording a pop-leaning album with producer Greg Kurstin which she had to decide not to release in favor of writing and recording Come Get Your Wife. King, who had recently given birth to her son at the time, was told that taking time off would jeopardize her chance to capitalize on her recent success, so she requested that her team utilize the rich songwriting community in Nashville to find some songs for the album that she could pair with songs she had already written herself. She stated that she was initially only pitched songs written specifically for female artists but felt they didn't tend to "fit her vibe", and requested songs that were either written specifically for men or for an artist of any gender. After hearing the song "Out Yonder", King had the writers, Ella Langley, Bobby Hamrick and Matt McKinney brought onto her tour bus for two days to write with her, with the quartet ultimately producing four songs for the project. Once she had all of the songs, King and producer Ross Copperman recorded the majority of the album live with the band in two days.

Speaking to People, King explained that she felt she was able to be more vulnerable on this album in comparison to her previous record Shake the Spirit, noting "Now I'm in a place where I have nothing to hide. I'm much more comfortable with being vulnerable. I don't have to be so defensive, I can just be open. This whole album and everything is revealing a lot more about myself, because now I'm much more comfortable because I have nothing... It's not that I don't have anything to prove, because I'll always prove it to you. I will. I love to. But I'm being much more revealing about my life and about a part of my life that I've been so protective of, which is where my family's from and where my family still lives in Ohio, and what truly made me who I am and what brought me here."

== Singles ==
The album's lead single "Drunk (And I Don't Wanna Go Home)", a duet with country artist Miranda Lambert, was released on February 26, 2021, and subsequently reached number one on the Billboard Country Airplay chart in April 2022. King previously collaborated with Lambert on a 2019 cover of "Fooled Around and Fell in Love" alongside Maren Morris, Tenille Townes, Ashley McBryde and Caylee Hammack to promote her Roadside Bars & Pink Guitars Tour.

The second official single from Come Get Your Wife, "Worth a Shot", a duet with country artist Dierks Bentley, was released on June 6, 2022. They previously collaborated on "Different for Girls", a track from Bentley's 2016 album, Black.

Three songs were also released as promotional singles ahead of the album — "Out Yonder", "Try Jesus", and "Tulsa". When describing "Tulsa", which features backing vocals from Ashley McBryde, King explained: 'Tulsa is a song about doing someone wrong. This is not about tearing women down but it's about putting the blame on the wrongdoer. If a man is cheating on you, it's not her fault because there are a million other girls he would do it with. And he'll just cheat on her too. It's a song about uniting and not taking shit from this real P.O.S.' "Try Jesus" also received a music video directed by American actress Edi Patterson.

King released a cover of Tyler Childers' "Jersey Giant" as a standalone single on November 11, 2022, but it was included on the digital versions of Come Get Your Wife. Childers explained that he wrote the song but that he stopped performing it after a short time and decided to give the song to King. Of the song, King stated "Tyler Childers is not too far from where my family lives and he's a legend. The life of a song is something so beautiful to me, and country music has taught me to see that the opportunity to sing a song written by someone else, is nothing short of a gift, a blessing. I was humbled and so excited that Tyler gave his song to me. I tried to blend the two worlds of honoring traditional bluegrass and what country music is to me." "Jersey Giant" was released to the Triple A format on May 22, 2023, as the album's overall third radio single.

== Track listing ==
Come Get Your Wife track listing
No.	Title	Writer(s)	Producer(s)	Length
1.	"Ohio"	Elle King; Bobby Hamrick; Ella Langley; Matt McKinney	King; Ross Copperman	4:31
2.	"Before You Met Me"	Tofer Brown; Lauren Hungate; Meg McRee	King; Copperman	3:00
3.	"Try Jesus"	King; Ashley Gorley; Ben Johnson; Casey Cathleen Smith; Geoffrey Warburton	King; Copperman	3:06
4.	"Drunk (And I Don't Wanna Go Home)" (featuring Miranda Lambert)	King; Martin Johnson	Johnson; Brandon Paddock; Kyle Moorman^{[a]}	4:04
5.	"Lucky"	King; Hamrick; Langley; McKinney	King; Copperman	3:14
6.	"Worth a Shot" (featuring Dierks Bentley)	Ross Copperman; Shane McAnally; Josh Osborne	King; Copperman; Brandon Towles^{[a]}; Ethan Barrette^{[a]}	3:31
7.	"Tulsa"	King; Hamrick; Langley; McKinney	King; Copperman	2:42
8.	"Crawlin' Mood"	Jesse Frasure; Charlie Worsham	King; Copperman	2:33
9.	"Bonafide"	King; Hamrick; Langley; McKinney	King; Copperman	3:02
10.	"Blacked Out"	King; M. Johnson	King; Copperman	3:26
11.	"Out Yonder"	Hamrick; Langley; McKinney	King; Copperman	3:23
12.	"Jersey Giant"	Tyler Childers	King; Charlie Worsham	4:26
13.	"Love Go By"	King; Joe Janiak; Warburton	King; Copperman	3:42
Total length:				44:46

Note

- "Jersey Giant" is not present on physical releases.

== Personnel ==
Credits adapted from AllMusic.

Vocals

- Dierks Bentley – duet vocals
- Abby Cahours – background vocals
- Naomi Cahours – background vocals
- Nickie Conely – choir
- Jason Eskridge – choir
- Martin Johnson – background vocals
- Miranda Lambert – duet vocals, background vocals
- Elle King – lead vocals, background vocals
- Ashley McBryde – background vocals
- Wil Merrell – choir
- Brandon Paddock – background vocals
- Kiley Phillips – choir
- Katie Wilshire – background vocals
- Micah Wilshire – background vocals
- Charlie Worsham – background vocals

Musicians

- Tyler Chiarelli – Dobro, electric guitar
- Dave Cohen – keyboards, synthesizer, accordion
- Ross Copperman – programming, acoustic guitar, keyboards
- Fred Eltringham – drums, percussion
- Jenee Fleenor – fiddle, mandolin
- Jesse Frasure – programming
- Dan Dugmore – pedal steel guitar, electric guitar, Dobro
- Kenny Greenberg – electric guitar
- Sean Hurley – bass guitar
- Rob Humphreys – drums
- Martin Johnson – acoustic guitar, electric guitar, synthesizer
- David Kalmusky – electric guitar
- Elle King – acoustic guitar
- Todd Lombardo – acoustic guitar, banjo, mandolin
- Tony Lucido – bass guitar
- Rob McNelley – electric guitar, acoustic guitar
- Kyle Moorman – programming
- John Osborne – electric guitar
- Brandon Paddock – percussion, programming, synthesizer
- Lex Price – bass guitar, mandolin
- Danny Rader – acoustic guitar, electric guitar
- Ketch Secor – fiddle
- F. Reid Shippen – programming
- Ilya Toshinskiy – acoustic guitar
- Charlie Worsham – acoustic guitar, accordion, banjo, mandolin
- Jonathan Yudkin – cello, viola, violin
- Nir Z – drums, percussion

Technical

- Daniel Bacigalupi – mastering
- Ethan Barrette – engineering assistance
- Matthew Berniato – package design, photography
- Jeff Braun – mixing
- Ross Copperman – engineering, producer
- Perry Geyer – engineering
- Mark Hagen – editing
- Brandon Hood – editing
- Ted Jensen – mastering
- Martin Johnson – producer
- Scott Johnson – production manager
- Elle King — producer
- Buckley Miller – engineering
- Kyle Moorman – engineering
- Brandon Paddock – engineering, producer
- Justin Sheriff – engineering
- F. Reid Shippen – mixing, engineering
- Brandon Towles – engineering assistance
- Rob Whitaker – engineering
- Brian David Willis – editing
- Charlie Worsham – engineering

== Charts ==
Chart performance for Come Get Your Wife
Chart (2023)	Peak position
UK Album Downloads (Official Charts)	26
US Billboard 200	53
US Top Country Albums (Billboard)	11
