= Dear Alcohol =

2022 single by Dax

Single by Dax

from the album What is Life?
- Released: March 11, 2022
- Genre: R&B; country hip hop
- Length: 3:56
- Label: Records; Columbia
- Songwriters: Daniel Nwosu Jr.; Lex Nour
- Producer: Lex Nour

Dax singles chronology
"40 Days 40 Nights" (2021)	"Dear Alcohol" (2022)	"Depression" (2022)

Music video
- "Dear Alcohol" on YouTube

Alternate cover

"Dear Alcohol" is a song by Canadian rapper Dax. He wrote the song with producer Lex Nour. A country music-inspired remix featuring American musician Elle King was released in June 2022. The solo version was included on Dax's fourth studio album What is Life? in 2023.

== Background ==
Daniel Nwosu Jr., known by his stage name of Dax, began working on "Dear Alcohol" as poem during the COVID-19 pandemic, intended to reflect his own drinking habits that began after he moved to Los Angeles in pursuit of a music career. He stated that he began drinking more after performing at many events, which led him to feel "more social, and more confident". He resultingly felt as though he was "chasing" that version of himself and trying to "bridge the gap between this super confident person when" drunk, and his "normal shy self". This served as the inspiration for the poem, that eventually turned into the song. Dax described the song as "very personal' for him. Shortly after the song's release, Dax announced that he had been sober for thirty days, partially thanks to "Dear Alcohol", which was the longest he had remained sober in eight years.

== Critical reception ==
Alex Harris of Neon Music described "Dear Alcohol" as "intense, confessional, and deeply personal," adding that it "serves as a reflection of the internal battles many face with addiction and self-worth". Melody Lau and Andrea Warner of CBC Music called the song "a winner", while naming it the best song of Dax's career.

== Live performance ==
Dax performed "Dear Alcohol" live at the 2022 Canadian Country Music Awards at the Scotiabank Saddledome in Calgary, Alberta. The show was broadcast live on Canadian television network Global on September 11, 2022, and his performance was later uploaded to YouTube.

== Accolades ==
Accolades for "Dear Alcohol"
Year	Association	Category	Result	Ref
2023	CCMA	Top Selling Canadian Single Of The Year	Won	

== Commercial performance ==
In the United States, "Dear Alcohol" peaked at number 28 on the Billboard Hot Country Songs chart for the week of April 30, 2022, spending 23 weeks on that chart in total. It also peaked at number nine on the all-genre Bubbling Under Hot 100 chart for the same week, spending seven weeks there in total. The song has been certified Platinum by the Recording Industry Association of America. In Canada, "Dear Alcohol" received some airplay on country radio and peaked at number 36 on the Canada Country airplay chart for the week of October 22, 2022, spending eight weeks on there overall. It has been certified Platinum by Music Canada. The song was named the "Top Selling Canadian Single of the Year" at the 2023 Canadian Country Music Awards.

== Music video ==
The official music video for "Dear Alcohol" premiered on YouTube on March 11, 2022, and was shot by Logan Meis. The official music video for the remix featuring Elle King premiered on August 10, 2022, and was filmed in Nashville, Tennessee. It was also directed by Logan Meis, and opens with an Alcoholics Anonymous meeting.

== Track listings ==
Digital download - single

1. "Dear Alcohol" – 3:56

Digital download - single

1. "Dear Alcohol" (feat. Elle King) – 3:08
2. "Dear Alcohol" – 3:56

Digital download - single

1. "Dear Alcohol" (feat. Elle King) – 3:08
2. "Dear Alcohol" (feat. Elle King) [Extended] – 4:40
3. "Dear Alcohol" – 3:56

== Charts ==
Chart performance for "Dear Alcohol"
Chart (2022)	Peak position
Canada Country (Billboard)	36
US Bubbling Under Hot 100 (Billboard)	9
US Digital Song Sales (Billboard)	15
US Hot Country Songs (Billboard)	28

== Certifications ==
Certifications for "Dear Alcohol"
Region	Certification	Certified units/sales
Canada (Music Canada)	2× Platinum	160,000^{‡}
United States (RIAA)	Platinum	1,000,000^{‡}
^{‡} Sales+streaming figures based on certification alone.
