= Drunk (And I Don't Wanna Go Home) =

2021 single by Elle King and Miranda Lambert

Single by Elle King and Miranda Lambert

from the album Come Get Your Wife
- Released: February 26, 2021
- Genre: Country; hip-hop
- Length: 4:05
- Label: RCA Records
- Songwriters: Elle King; Martin Johnson
- Producers: Brandon Paddock; Martin Johnson

Elle King singles chronology
"Another You" (2020)	"Drunk (And I Don't Wanna Go Home)" (2021)	"Worth a Shot" (2022)

Miranda Lambert singles chronology
"Settling Down" (2020)	"Drunk (And I Don't Wanna Go Home)" (2021)	"If I Was a Cowboy" (2021)

Music video
- "Drunk (And I Don't Wanna Go Home)" on YouTube

"Drunk (And I Don't Wanna Go Home)" is a song by American singers Elle King and Miranda Lambert. It was released on February 26, 2021 as the lead single from King's third studio album Come Get Your Wife. The song reached number one on the Country Airplay chart in April 2022, becoming the first female duet to reach the top of the charts in almost thirty years following Reba McEntire and Linda Davis' "Does He Love You" in 1993.

The song was nominated for the Grammy Award for Best Country Duo/Group Performance, the Country Music Association Award for Musical Event of the Year and won the Academy of Country Music Award for Video of the Year.

== Background and composition ==
Miranda Lambert teased the song on social media on February 23, 2021. The song was recorded prior to the COVID-19 pandemic in both Nashville and New York. Rolling Stone described the song as a "neon-spattered, banjo-flecked euphoria that fits perfectly with the idea of blowing off steam well into the wee hours".

King and Lambert performed the song live for the first time when they opened the 56th Academy of Country Music Awards on April 18, 2021.

== Music video ==
The song's music video stars King and Lambert singing the song's lyrics on a stage in a wedding chapel. The video also contains footage of many guests dancing and performing other wedding traditions. Halfway through the music video, Lambert pours an alcoholic beverage into a bowl of punch in order to fit the topic of the song.

== Personnel ==
Credits adapted from Tidal.

- Elle King – vocals, songwriting, lyrics, background vocals
- Miranda Lambert – vocals, background vocals
- Martin Johnson – songwriting, lyrics, production, acoustic guitar, background vocals, electric guitar, piano, synthesizer
- Brandon Paddock – production, background vocals, engineering, percussion, programming, synthesizer
- Abby Cahours – background vocals
- Naomi Cahours – background vocals
- Sean Hurley – bass
- Tyler Chiarelli – dobro, electric guitar
- Rob Humphreys – drums
- Kyle Moorman – engineering, miscellaneous production, programming
- Ted Jensen – mastering engineer
- Jeff Braun – mixing engineer

== Charts ==
=== Weekly charts ===
Weekly chart performance for "Drunk (And I Don't Wanna Go Home)"
Chart (2021–2022)	Peak position
Australia Country Hot 50 (TMN)	11
Canada Hot 100 (Billboard)	73
Canada Country (Billboard)	28
Canada Hot AC (Billboard)	48
Global 200 (Billboard)	193
US Billboard Hot 100	37
US Adult Contemporary (Billboard)	28
US Adult Pop Airplay (Billboard)	12
US Country Airplay (Billboard)	1
US Hot Country Songs (Billboard)	6
US Hot Rock & Alternative Songs (Billboard)	4

=== Year-end charts ===
2021 year-end chart performance for "Drunk (And I Don't Wanna Go Home)"
Chart (2021)	Position
US Adult Top 40 (Billboard)	34
US Hot Country Songs (Billboard)	12
US Hot Rock & Alternative Songs (Billboard)	9

2022 year-end chart performance for "Drunk (And I Don't Wanna Go Home)"
Chart (2022)	Position
US Country Airplay (Billboard)	17
US Hot Country Songs (Billboard)	37
US Hot Rock & Alternative Songs (Billboard)	11

== Certifications ==
Certifications for "Drunk (And I Don't Wanna Go Home)"
Region	Certification	Certified units/sales
Canada (Music Canada)	2× Platinum	160,000^{‡}
New Zealand (RMNZ)	Gold	15,000^{‡}
United States (RIAA)	Platinum	1,000,000^{‡}
^{‡} Sales+streaming figures based on certification alone.

== Release history ==
Region	Date	Format	Label	Ref.
Various	February 26, 2021	Digital download	RCA	
United States	March 8, 2021	Adult contemporary radio	RCA	
United States	June 14, 2021	Country radio	RCA	
