= Dave Bassett (songwriter) =

American songwriter and record producer

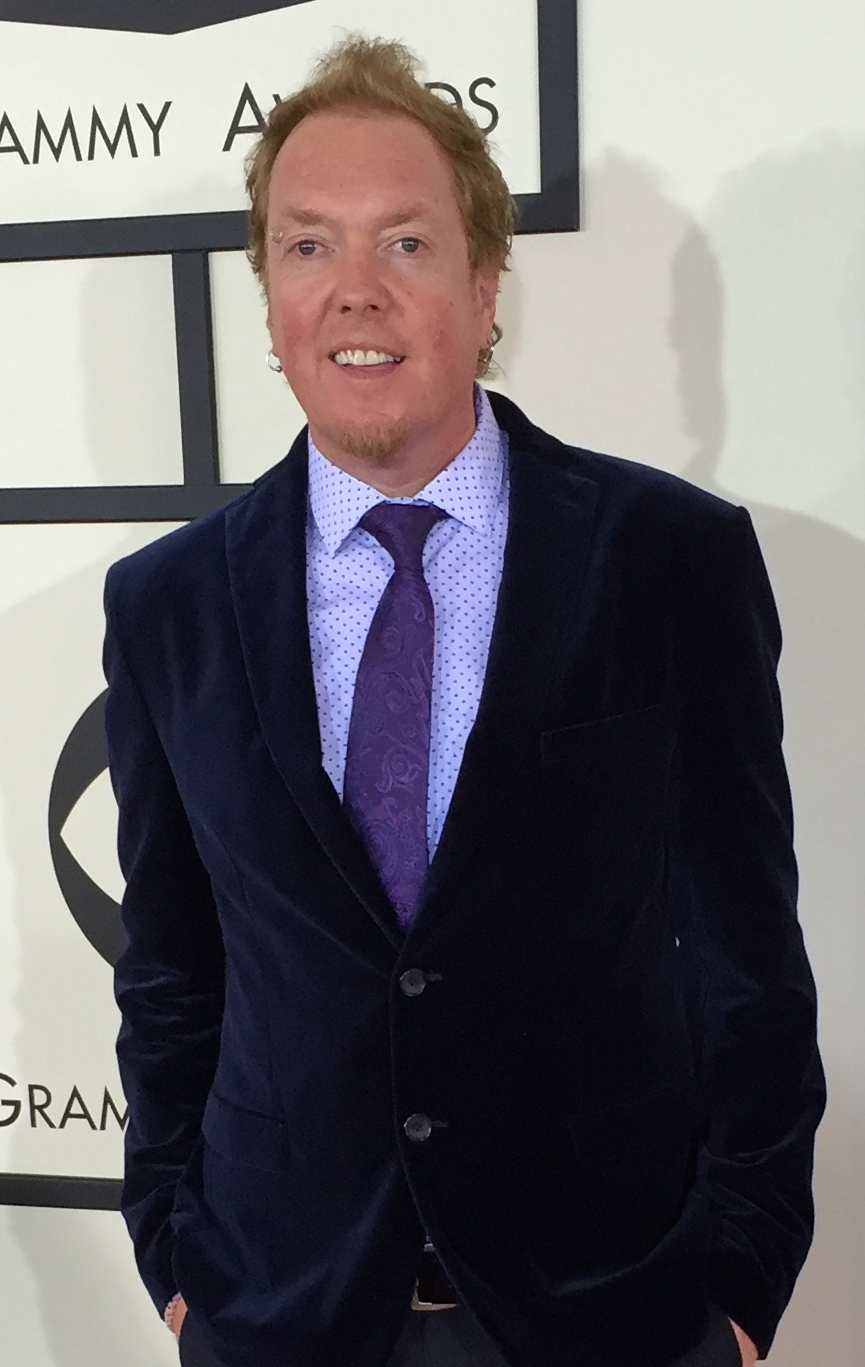
- Bassett in 2016

Background information
- Born: Dave Richard Bassett
- Origin: Chicago, Illinois, U.S.
- Genres: Pop; rock; R&B; alternative; theatre; country
- Occupations: Songwriter; record producer

Dave Richard Bassett is an American songwriter and record producer. Originally from Chicago, a Deerfield High School graduate, Bassett relocated to Los Angeles to pursue a musical career after a chance on-stage performance with U2.

== Career ==
Bassett has worked in various genres, writing and producing music for artists such as alternative acts Elle King, Vance Joy, Bishop Briggs, Alice Merton, Fitz and the Tantrums and Walk off the Earth to rock acts Shinedown, Pop Evil and Halestorm to mainstream names such as Rachel Platten, Josh Groban, Idina Menzel and Daughtry.

=== Notable music credits ===
"Fight Song" is a song recorded by Rachel Platten, released as a single by Columbia Records on February 19, 2015. Platten co-wrote the song with Dave Bassett.

Also produced and co-written by Bassett, Ellie King's "Ex's & Oh's" is certified double Platinum in the United States, Australia and Canada. "Ex's & Oh's" charted in multiple formats in the US and across the world including US Billboard Hot 100, US Adult Alternative Songs (Billboard), US Adult Top 40 (Billboard), US Alternative Songs (Billboard), US Hot Rock Songs (Billboard), US Rock Airplay (Billboard). "Ex's & Oh's" received two nominations at the 58th Grammy Awards: Best Rock Performance and Best Rock Song.

In 2018, Bassett produced seven songs on Vance Joy's Nation of Two LP including the co-written Gold Certified tracks "Lay It on Me" and "Saturday Sun." He also co-produced and co-wrote the singles "White Flag" for Bishop Briggs and Alice Merton's "Lash Out."

In 2019, Bassett co-wrote the hit single "All My Friends" by The Revivalists as well as Shinedown's #1 single "Attention Attention".

In 2020 Bassett co-wrote "Hero" by Weezer with Rivers Cuomo which went to #1 at Alternative radio.

=== Dave Not Dave ===
In 2016, Bassett started a band called Dave Not Dave whose song "Cold Blood" was featured in The Royals and Suits.

=== Film, television and advertising ===
Bassett's scores and songs have appeared in national spots for the likes of Toyota, Target, T-Mobile, Dunkin' Donuts, Google, Nissan, Victoria's Secret, Best Buy, FIFA, the Olympics, as well as film and TV shows including The Royals, Suits, Grey's Anatomy, Nashville, Royal Pains, CSI: Miami, and films such as Sing, Annie, Runaway Bride, Muppets Most Wanted and Bridge to Terabithia.

Some notable film songs include:

Composer for "Set it All Free" from the movie Sing featuring vocals by Scarlett Johansson.

Co-writer, co-producer for "How a Heart Unbreaks" from Pitch Perfect 3.

Co-writer for Elle King's "Good Girls" from 2016's Ghostbusters Original Motion Picture Soundtrack.

Co-writer for "Smile" from the 2014 release of Annie performed by Rachel Platten.

== Awards ==
In 2016, Bassett was nominated for two Grammy Awards for Best Rock Song and Best Rock Performance for co-writing and producing Elle King's "Ex's & Oh's".

Bassett won two ASCAP Pop Awards in 2016 with Rachel Platten's Fight Song and Elle King's "Ex's & Oh's". Bassett won a second ASCAP Pop Award for "Ex's and Oh's" in 2017.

In 2013 Halestorm won a Grammy "Best Hard Rock/Metal Performance" with their song "Love Bites" co-written by Bassett.

In 2010 Bassett won an ASCAP Pop Award for co-writing Shinedown's "Second Chance" and in 2011 for Shinedown's "If You Only Knew".
