= The Elle King EP =

EP by Elle King
- Released: June 12, 2012
- Length: 11:19
- Label: RCA

Elle King chronology
The Elle King EP (2012)	Love Stuff (2015)

The Elle King EP is an EP by singer-songwriter Elle King, her debut release, released June 12, 2012. The song "Playing for Keeps" was used as the theme song for Mob Wives Chicago. The second song written by King on the banjo, "Good to Be a Man", resulted in her receiving a recording contract with RCA Records.

King mixed up various styles on the songs on her EP, from a defiant growl to mournful to lascivious. She doesn't believe that "people listen to albums as a kind of whole, cohesive record anymore, anyway." She thinks that "the one thing that ties through all my different sounds is my voice, and I think we're all just trying to figure out how to tie everything around that."

== Track listing ==
No.	Title	Writer(s)	Producer	Length
1.	"Playing for Keeps"	Elle King, Chris DeStefano	Chris DeStefano	3:37
2.	"Good to Be a Man"	E. King	Andy Baldwin	2:48
3.	"No One Can Save You"	E. King		2:14
4.	"My Neck, My Back (Live)"	Khia Chambers, Michael J. Williams, Ed Meriwether		2:40
Total length:				11:19

== Personnel ==
Musicians

- Elle King: vocals, banjo, acoustic guitar

Production

- Chris Chris DeStefano: producer, mixing (track 1)
- Andy Baldwin: producer (track 2), mixing (track 4)
- Stephen Marcussen: mastering
