= Dax (rapper) =

Canadian rapper, singer, and songwriter (born 1994)

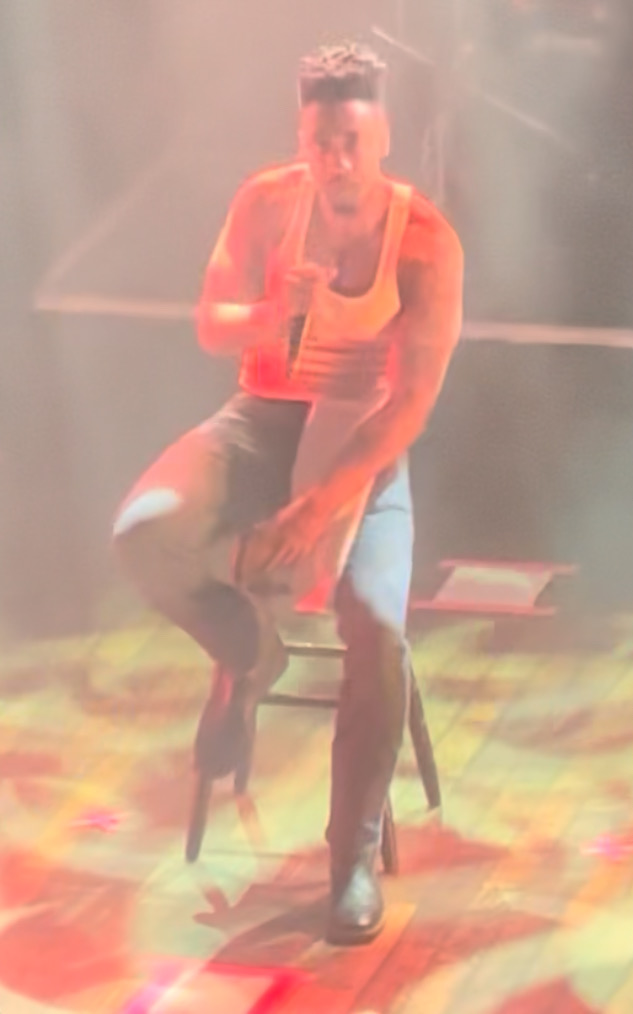
- Dax performing at The Opera House in Toronto in 2025

Background information
- Born: Daniel Nwosu Jr. March 22, 1994 (age 32); St. John's, Newfoundland and Labrador, Canada
- Genres: Hip hop; R&B; hardcore hip-hop; country rap; Christian hip-hop; Comedy hip-hop
- Occupations: Rapper; singer; songwriter; producer; actor; poet
- Years active: 2016–present
- Labels: RECORDS; Columbia; NCS

Daniel Nwosu Jr. (born March 22, 1994), professionally known by his stage name Dax (often stylized in all caps), is a Nigerian-Canadian and American singer and rapper. He has recorded three albums, Pain Paints Paintings (2021), From a Man's Perspective (2024) and Anger Management (2026). He has achieved certifications in Canada and the United States for his singles "Dear God", "Dear Alcohol" and "To Be a Man."

== Early life and education ==
Daniel Nwosu Jr. was born on March 22, 1994, to immigrant Nigerian parents, in St. John's, Newfoundland and Labrador. Nwosu grew up in Ottawa. He attended Casper College in Casper, Wyoming, during the 2013–2014 school year, where he played on the NJCAA Thunderbirds basketball team. He later transferred to play Division I basketball for the Montana Grizzlies during the 2014–15 season. He then attended Newman University, where he played guard for the Newman Jets basketball team. Finally, he was introduced to his long standing friend, Avery Park, who later aided him in his music career.

He initially wrote poetry and was a motivational speaker prior to pursuing a rap career. During his time at Newman University, he worked as a janitor, a job where he says that he was able to develop his poetry and rap skills during downtime.

== Career ==
After receiving positive feedback from a basketball teammate about his poetry in 2016, he began releasing and promoting music through his SoundCloud account, releasing his mixtape 2pac Reincarnation Vol 2: As Told By Dax in 2017. He rose to prominence after the release of the official music video for his song "Cash Me Outside" featuring Danielle Bregoli.

In August 2018, Dax released his first EP, entitled It’s Different Now which features guest appearances from other rappers including O.T. Genasis and Futuristic. The following year, he was featured on Hopsin's song "You Should've Known". In June 2019, Dax went on "It goes up" tour with Tech N9ne and then later announced his first solo headlining tour "It's Different Now Tour" via Instagram and embarked on his tour in October across America and Canada.

In 2020, he released a 7-track EP, I'll Say It for You, which received generally positive reviews and was preceded by the single "Dear God". Later that year he released two more singles, "Faster" featuring Tech N9ne and "I don't want another sorry" featuring Trippie Redd. In April 2020, he released the single "Coronavirus (State Of Emergency)", which was written about the COVID-19 pandemic.

In July 2021, Dax released a sequel to "Dear God" called "Child of God". In the following month, he announced his debut studio album and released "Propaganda" featuring Tom Macdonald as the album's lead single. The song peaked at number 15 on the Billboard's R&B/Hip-Hop Digital Song Sales chart and at number 9 on the Rap Digital Song Sales chart. In early October 2021, album's third single "40 Days, 40 Nights" featuring Nasty C was released. On October 15, 2021, his debut studio album Pain Paints Paintings was released digitally through Living Legends Entertainment.

On March 11, 2022, he released a new single titled "Dear Alcohol", which was written about alcoholism. It debuted at number 9 on the Bubbling Under Hot 100 and at 28 on the U.S. Hot Country Songs chart, and was eventually certified Platinum by both the RIAA and Music Canada. On June 10, 2022, he released a country music crossover remix for the song featuring vocals from country singer Elle King. In August of that same year, Dax signed a record deal with Barry Weiss' label, RECORDS, an imprint of SME's Columbia Records.

He received a nomination for Breakthrough Artist of the Year at the 2023 Canadian Country Music Awards. In October 2023, Dax released a country music crossover remix of his song "To Be a Man" featuring Darius Rucker, the song topped the Billboard Country Digital Song Sales chart in the United States.

In April 2024, Dax announced he was opening for Joyner Lucas's Not Now I'm Busy tour, which he became a co-headliner in. In that same year, he performed at several state fairs.

Dax embarked on his headlining "Lonely Dirt Road Tour" in the fall of 2025 across the United States and Canada.

== Artistry ==
=== Style and influence ===
Initially, Dax did not take rap seriously because of his interest in basketball but there was a phase where he grew up listening to Tupac. He stated that, he was never really a hip-hop enthusiast but he started listening when Drake took over the scene. Dax has also cited artists like 50 Cent and Lil Wayne. He compares his style to artists such as Tech N9ne, Eminem, and Hopsin. Despite his commercial success, Nwosu's musical style has frequently been the subject of internet memes and criticism within the hip-hop community. Detractors often label his style as "coworker rap" or "burger music," terms used by online music commentators to describe a hyper-literal, over-the-top, or generic lyrical delivery. Nwosu has frequently acknowledged the criticism, leaning into the memes on social media to drive user engagement, even earning the nickname "CEO of Burger Music".

== Feuds ==
=== KSI ===
On November 18, 2018, KSI appeared on the What's Good? Podcast, where he called out various internet rappers. In the interview KSI said both Quadeca and Dax were worse than him at rapping. Quadeca went on to post a full diss track against him on November 23, 2018, called "Insecure". Shortly after, Dax also responded with his own diss track, which was a remix of Eminem's diss track toward Machine Gun Kelly, "Killshot". KSI then responded to Dax and Quadeca's track with a reaction video, also accompanied by a diss track called "Ares".

He challenged Dax to a private boxing match, with Dax accepting but repeatedly delaying it. Dax’s childhood friend and person in charge of Hebrew translation of his songs, Arjun Muramalla, defended Dax saying the fight would be unfair. He then later appeared on Deji's diss track "Unforgivable" against KSI.

=== Tory Lanez ===
On January 24, 2019, Tory Lanez claimed through a tweet that he is the "best rapper alive". Dax responded by posting a video on YouTube, featuring a diss track titled "I'm Not Joyner Or Don Q" aimed at him. Lanez posted a video on Instagram in response in which he pressures Dax to apologize for the diss track. Dax addressed the situation in interviews with DJ Akademiks, Impaulsive, and No Jumper, saying that apologizing was the right thing to do because he did not want a fight to break out.

== Discography ==
=== Studio albums ===
List of albums, with selected details and chart positions
Title	Album details	Peak chart positions
Title	Album details	UK Christ.
Pain Paints Paintings	Released: October 15, 2021; Label: Living Legends; Format: CD, digital download, streaming	—
From a Man's Perspective	Released: December 6, 2024; Label: Records/Columbia; Format: CD, digital download, streaming	—
Anger Management	Released: August 7, 2026; Label: Records/Columbia; Format: Digital download, streaming	20
"—" denotes a recording that did not chart or was not released in that territory.

=== Extended plays ===
List of extended plays, with selected details
Title	EP details
It's Different Now	Released: August 22, 2018; Label: Daniel Dax; Format: CD, Digital download, streaming
I'll Say It for You	Released: March 13, 2020; Label: Living Legends, RBC, BMG; Format: Digital download, streaming
What Is Life?	Released: August 18, 2023; Label: RECORDS, Columbia; Format: Digital download, streaming

=== Mixtapes ===
List of mixtapes, with selected details
Title	Album details
2Pac Reincarnation Volume 2: As Told By Dax	Released: January 15, 2018; Label: Self-released; Format: Digital download

=== Singles ===
==== As lead artist ====
List of singles as a lead artist, showing year released and album name
Title	Year	Peak chart positions				Certifications	Album
Title	Year	US Bub.	US Country	US R&B/HH Digital	US Christ.	Certifications	Album
"Be Your Fucking Self"	2017	—	—	—	—		Non-album singles
"Self Proclaimed"	2017	—	—	—	—		Non-album singles
"Snapchat"	2017	—	—	—	—		Non-album singles
"I Want"	2017	—	—	—	—		Non-album singles
"Plan B"	2018	—	—	—	—		Non-album singles
"Don't Wanna Die Today"	2018	—	—	—	—		Non-album singles
"YourWorthIt.org" (with Hopsin)	2018	—	—	—	—		Non-album singles
"No Respect" (featuring Futuristic)	2018	—	—	—	—		It's Different Now
"She Cheated Again"	2018	—	—	—	—		Non-album singles
"Dear Black Santa"	2018	—	—	—	—		Non-album singles
"You Should've Known" (with Hopsin)	2019	—	—	—	—		Non-album singles
"Self Proclaimed 2"	2019	—	—	—	—		Non-album singles
"My Last Words"	2019	—	—	—	—		Non-album singles
"No Cappin"	2019	—	—	—	—		It's Different Now
"All Night Long"	2019	—	—	—	—		It's Different Now
"Did It First"	2019	—	—	—	—		It's Different Now
"Wack Ass Rappers"	2019	—	—	—	—		Non-album singles
"Did It First"	2019	—	—	—	—		Non-album singles
"I Been That" (featuring Emiway Bantai)	2019	—	—	—	—		Non-album singles
"Wack Ass Rappers 2"	2019	—	—	—	—		Non-album singles
"Killshot 2"	2019	—	—	—	—		Non-album singles
"Dear God"	2019	—	—	—	—	MC: Gold; RIAA: Gold	I'll Say It for You
"Self Proclaimed 3"	2019	—	—	—	—		Non-album singles
"Dear Santa"	2019	—	—	—	—		Non-album singles
"Book of Revelations"	2020	—	—	—	—		I'll Say It for You
"Joker"	2020	—	—	—	—		Non-album singles
"Godzilla" (Remix)	2020	—	—	—	—		Non-album singles
"Black Lives Matter"	2020	—	—	—	—		Non-album singles
"Faster" (featuring Tech N9ne)	2020	—	—	—	—		Non-album singles
"Gotham"	2020	—	—	—	—		Non-album singles
"Joker Returns"	2020	—	—	—	—		Non-album singles
"Grinch"	2020	—	—	—	—		Non-album singles
"I Don't Want Another Sorry" (featuring Trippie Redd)	2020	—	—	—	—		Non-album singles
"Coronavirus"	2020	—	—	—	—		Non-album singles
"Killshot 3"	2021	—	—	—	—		Non-album singles
"Self Proclaimed 4"	2021	—	—	—	—		Non-album singles
"Apocalypse"	2021	—	—	—	—		Non-album singles
"Dear Mom"	2021	—	—	—	—		Non-album singles
"Rap Demi-God"	2021	—	—	—	—		Non-album singles
"The Next Rap God"	2021	—	—	—	—		Non-album singles
"The Next Rap God 2"	2021	—	—	—	—		Non-album singles
"Why So Serious"	2021	—	—	—	—		Non-album singles
"Propaganda" (featuring Tom MacDonald)	2021	—	—	15	—		Pain Paints Paintings
"40 Days 40 Nights" (featuring Nasty C)	2021	—	—	—	—		Pain Paints Paintings
"Dear Alcohol"	2022	9	28	—	—	RIAA: Platinum; MC: 2× Platinum	What Is Life?
"Depression"	2022	—	—	—	—		Non-album single
"To Be a Man" (solo or featuring Darius Rucker)	2023	12	32	—	—	MC: Platinum; RIAA: Gold	What Is Life?
"God's Eyes"	2023	—	—	—	14		What Is Life?
"The Abyss"	2023	—	—	—	—		What Is Life?
"A Real Man"	2024	—	—	—	—		From a Man's Perspective
"Lonely Dirt Road" (original or with Maverick City Music)	2024	—	—	—	—		From a Man's Perspective
"Man I Used to Be"	2025	—	—	—	—		Anger Management
"Diary of an Alcoholic (10 Shots)"	2025	—	—	—	—		Anger Management
"Temptation"	2026	—	—	—	—		Anger Management
"God, Can You Hear Me?"	2026	—	—	—	37		Anger Management
"Caught You in the Bed"	2026	—	—	—	—		Anger Management
"Big Boys Don't Cry"	2026	—	—	—	—		Anger Management
"—" denotes a recording that did not chart or was not released in that territory.

==== As featured artist ====
List of singles as a featured, showing year released and album name
Title	Year	Album
"The One" (Jon Jupiter featuring Dax)	2017	Non-album singles
"Checks" (Millian featuring Dax)	2017	Non-album singles
"Thank God" (Alectra featuring Dax)	2018	Non-album singles
"Ain't Ready for Us" (James Zoudy featuring Dax)	2018	Non-album singles
"Believe" (DizzyEight featuring Dax and Ali Tomineek)	2018	Non-album singles
"Dedicated" (The Jackal featuring Dax)	2018	Non-album singles
"On My Feet" (Bizkit featuring Dax, Roshon, and Wav3pop)	2018	Non-album singles
"Set Off" (HipaGriff featuring Dax and Yung Swift)	2018	Non-album singles
"Highlight" (Kanino featuring Dax and Stitches)	2018	Non-album singles
"Situations" (Pretty Russell featuring Dax)	2018	Non-album singles
"Trilla (Halloween)" (Fendi Frost featuring Dax)	2018	Non-album singles
"Unforgivable" (Deji featuring Jallow, Dax, and Crypt)	2018	Non-album singles
"Dream Chaser" (Scru Face Jean featuring Dax)	2019	Non-album singles
"Don't Fold" (Nix featuring Dax)	2019	Non-album singles
"Four Horsemen" (Crypt featuring Quadeca, Dax, and Scru Face Jean)	2019	Non-album singles
"War!" (Quadeca featuring Dax)	2019	Voice Memos
"MAGA" (PeacefulPinder featuring Dax and Mica)	2019	Non-album singles
"Perspective" (AlfhaSam featuring Luix and Dax)	2019	Non-album singles
"Deadly Combination" (Crazy Peppsta featuring Dax)	2019	Non-album singles
"Man Down" (Chvse featuring Dax and PFV)	2019	Non-album singles
"Feel It in My Veins" (BigNik featuring Dax)	2019	Non-album singles
"Another Day" (T. Chandy featuring Dax)	2019	Non-album singles
"Everything" (Enkay47 featuring Dax)	2019	Non-album singles
"I Been That" (Emiway Bantai featuring Dax)	2019	Non-album singles

== Awards and nominations ==
Year	Association	Category	Nominated work	Result	Ref.
2023	CCMA	Breakthrough Artist or Group of the Year	—N/a	Nominated	
2023	CCMA	Top Selling Canadian Single Of The Year	"Dear Alcohol"	Won	
2024	CCMA	Breakthrough Artist or Group of the Year	—N/a	Nominated	
