= Ex's & Oh's =

2014 single by Elle King

Single by Elle King

from the album Love Stuff
- Released: September 23, 2014
- Recorded: 2014
- Studio: Sun Studio, 706 Union Avenue, Memphis, Tennessee
- Genre: Pop rock; blues rock; alternative rock
- Length: 3:22
- Label: RCA
- Songwriters: Elle King; Dave Bassett
- Producer: Dave Bassett

Elle King singles chronology
"I Don't Mind" (2013)	"Ex's & Oh's" (2014)	"Under the Influence" (2014)

"Ex's & Oh's" is a song recorded by American singer and songwriter Elle King for her debut studio album, Love Stuff (2015). It was released on September 23, 2014, as King's debut single and the album's lead single via RCA Records. The song was written by King alongside the song's producer, Dave Bassett. "Ex's & Oh's" is primarily an uptempo pop rock, blues rock, and alternative rock song with elements of Southern rock, and a swing beat.

Upon the song's release, "Ex's & Oh's" received critical acclaim from many music critics, with praise given to King's creativity with its lyrics and its catchy, upbeat sound. The song achieved success in the rock genre, peaking at number 1 on the Billboard Hot Rock Songs chart, and later crossed over to adult pop radio and became an international hit. "Ex's & Oh's" reached the top of the Alternative Songs chart in September 2015, becoming only the second song by a solo female artist to reach the top since 1996 after Lorde achieved the feat in 2013 with "Royals". The song also became King's first top-10 hit on the Billboard Hot 100, peaking at number 10. In total, "Ex's & Oh's" appeared on 36 charts. The song peaked at number one on five charts as well as reaching the top ten on 21 charts, including Australia, Austria, and New Zealand, among others.

"Ex's & Oh's" has since been certified platinum or higher in seven nations, including in the United States, where it has been Certified 4× Platinum for sales of 4,000,000 units. It reached the top ten on year-end charts in both 2015 and 2016, including number 6 on the Hot Rock Songs chart in both 2015 and 2016, Rock Airplay at number 4 in 2015, and Adult Contemporary in 2016. At the 58th Grammy Awards, "Ex's & Oh's" was nominated for Best Rock Performance and Best Rock Song.

== Composition ==
"Ex's & Oh's" is a blues rock, pop rock and alternative rock song with elements of Southern rock, and a swing beat. The song was written by Elle King with the song's producer, Dave Bassett, and King credits him with helping her shape the sound of the album. Its instrumentation includes the guitar and drums and is influenced by country music. The song's lyrics describe the narrator's past relationships with needy men and her tendency to "[chew] men up and eat them". King describes how her ex-boyfriends are like ghosts; they always want to come back to haunt her. She also explains how her feelings toward her boyfriends quickly shift and her carelessness over the relationship.

Sheet music for the song shows the key of E minor, with the chorus in the key of G major, with a tempo of 140 beats per minute.

== Critical reception ==
"Ex's & Oh's" received acclaim from many music critics. Stephen Thomas Erlewine of AllMusic labelled the song one of the highlights of Love Stuff, writing, "When King walks a fine line between rock crunch and soul testifying, there's some fire." Entertainment blog Renowned for Sound rated the song 4.5 stars out of 5; reviewer Marcus Floyd praised both King's storytelling ability and the song's catchy production, saying that "it just has this attractive sound that makes you want to hear it again and again". Bradley Stern wrote a very positive review of the song for MuuMuse in which he described the song as "ballsy, brash and profoundly #unapologetic."

== Music video ==
Two music videos were released for the song.

The first premiered on October 7, 2014, and features the song's lyrics played out in a carnival shooting gallery attraction. It is a hybrid of animation and live action. King does not appear in the video.

The second (fully live action) video premiered on May 1, 2015. Directed by Michael Maxxis, it begins with King's character kicking her boyfriend, played by Thom Glant, out of their car in the middle of a desert and then focuses largely on a barbecue party and other recreational activities at King's trailer campsite in the desert. The video occasionally cuts back to King's boyfriend trying to find her, which he eventually does. Featuring many scantily clad male characters and scenes with clear sexual innuendos, the video inverts the objectification of women common in contemporary music videos, and has been praised by critics for this role reversal.

== Live performances ==
- October 22, 2014, in Brooklyn for Paste Magazine.
- February 17, 2015, on The Today Show.
- April 3, 2015, on The Tonight Show Starring Jimmy Fallon.
- October 26, 2015, on Jimmy Kimmel Live!
- December 16, 2015, on TFI Friday Christmas Special in the UK.
- December 19, 2015, on Dermot O'Leary, BBC Radio 2
- December 31, 2015, on ABC's yearly broadcast of Dick Clark's New Year's Rockin' Eve with Ryan Seacrest. She was part of the prerecorded portion that is broadcast from Hollywood, California.
- January 22, 2016, on BBC's The Graham Norton Show in the UK.

== Charts ==
=== Weekly charts ===
Chart (2014–2016)	Peak position
Australia (ARIA)	5
Austria (Ö3 Austria Top 40)	5
Belgium (Ultratip Bubbling Under Flanders)	4
Belgium (Ultratip Bubbling Under Wallonia)	31
Canada Hot 100 (Billboard)	14
Canada AC (Billboard)	6
Canada CHR/Top 40 (Billboard)	10
Canada Hot AC (Billboard)	3
Canada Rock (Billboard)	12
Czech Republic Airplay (ČNS IFPI)	1
Denmark (Tracklisten)	22
Finland Airplay (Radiosoittolista)	63
France (SNEP)	119
Germany (GfK)	10
Hungary (Editors' Choice Top 40)	34
Hungary (Single Top 40)	22
Iceland (RÚV)	1
Ireland (IRMA)	28
Israel International Airplay (Media Forest)	4
Italy (FIMI)	69
Luxembourg Digital Songs (Billboard)	4
Mexico Ingles Airplay (Billboard)	1
Mexico Top 20 Inglés (Monitor Latino)	5
New Zealand (Recorded Music NZ)	10
Poland Airplay (ZPAV)	20
Scottish Singles Sales (Official Charts)	3
Slovenia (SloTop50)	12
Spain (Promusicae)	26
Sweden (Sverigetopplistan)	60
Switzerland (Schweizer Hitparade)	30
UK Singles (Official Charts)	15
US Billboard Hot 100	10
US Hot Rock & Alternative Songs (Billboard)	1
US Rock & Alternative Airplay (Billboard)	2
US Adult Contemporary (Billboard)	4
US Adult Pop Airplay (Billboard)	1
US Pop Airplay (Billboard)	7

=== Year-end charts ===
Chart (2015)	Position
Canada (Canadian Hot 100)	35
US Billboard Hot 100	73
US Adult Top 40 (Billboard)	22
US Hot Rock Songs (Billboard)	6
US Rock Airplay (Billboard)	4

Chart (2016)	Position
Australia (ARIA)	47
Austria (Ö3 Austria Top 40)	49
Canada (Canadian Hot 100)	95
Germany (Official German Charts)	61
Slovenia (SloTop50)	32
US Billboard Hot 100	63
US Adult Contemporary (Billboard)	6
US Adult Top 40 (Billboard)	17
US Hot Rock Songs (Billboard)	6
US Rock Airplay (Billboard)	24

=== Decade-end charts ===
Chart (2010–2019)	Position
US Hot Rock Songs (Billboard)	27

=== All-time charts ===
Chart (1995–2021)	Position
US Adult Alternative Songs (Billboard)	72

== Certifications ==
Region	Certification	Certified units/sales
Australia (ARIA)	3× Platinum	210,000^{‡}
Austria (IFPI Austria)	Gold	15,000^{*}
Canada (Music Canada)	5× Platinum	400,000^{‡}
Denmark (IFPI Danmark)	Platinum	90,000^{‡}
Germany (BVMI)	Platinum	400,000^{‡}
Italy (FIMI)	Gold	25,000^{‡}
Mexico (AMPROFON)	Platinum+Gold	90,000^{‡}
New Zealand (RMNZ)	2× Platinum	60,000^{‡}
Spain (Promusicae)	Gold	30,000^{‡}
Sweden (GLF)	Gold	20,000^{‡}
United Kingdom (BPI)	Platinum	600,000^{‡}
United States (RIAA)	4× Platinum	4,000,000^{‡}
^{*} Sales figures based on certification alone.^{‡} Sales+streaming figures based on certification alone.

== Release history ==
Country	Date	Format	Label	Ref.
United States	September 23, 2014	Digital download	RCA	
United States	October 7, 2014	Adult album alternative	RCA	
United States	May 11, 2015	Modern rock radio	RCA	
