= America's Sweetheart (song) =

Single by Elle King

from the album Love Stuff
- Released: February 8, 2016
- Genre: Country pop; country rock
- Length: 4:06
- Label: RCA
- Songwriters: Elle King; Martin Johnson
- Producer: Martin Johnson

Elle King singles chronology
"Under the Influence" (2015)	"America's Sweetheart" (2016)	"Different for Girls" (2016)

Music video
- "America's Sweetheart" on YouTube

"America's Sweetheart" is a song recorded by American singer and songwriter Elle King for her debut studio album, Love Stuff (2015). King co-wrote the song with its producer, Martin Johnson. It serves as the album's second mainstream single and the third overall (promoted concurrently with rock single "Under the Influence"), and was serviced to hot adult contemporary radio in the United States through RCA Records on February 8, 2016.

== Composition ==
"America's Sweetheart" is a country pop and country rock song instrumented predominantly by the banjo with a beat influenced by electronic dance music. The song's lyrics speak to the idea of nonconformity, with King outlining her unique qualities that conflict with the ideal persona of "America's sweetheart" and asserting that she refuses to change for anyone. King employs a belting technique on the chorus.

== Live performances ==
King performed "America's Sweetheart" during appearances on The Ellen DeGeneres Show and The Tonight Show Starring Jimmy Fallon, both airing February 11, 2016.

== Chart performance ==
=== Weekly charts ===
Chart (2016)	Peak position
Canada AC (Billboard)	39
Canada Hot AC (Billboard)	21
US Bubbling Under Hot 100 (Billboard)	14
US Adult Contemporary (Billboard)	28
US Adult Pop Airplay (Billboard)	14
US Alternative Airplay (Billboard)	38
US Hot Rock & Alternative Songs (Billboard)	10

=== Year end charts ===
Chart (2016)	Position
US Hot Rock Songs (Billboard)	30

== Certifications and sales ==
Region	Certification	Certified units/sales
Canada (Music Canada)	Platinum	80,000^{‡}
^{‡} Sales+streaming figures based on certification alone.

== Release history ==
Country	Date	Format	Label	Ref.
United States	February 8, 2016	Hot adult contemporary	RCA	
United States	March 15, 2016	Contemporary hit radio	RCA	
