= Elle King =

American musician (born 1989)

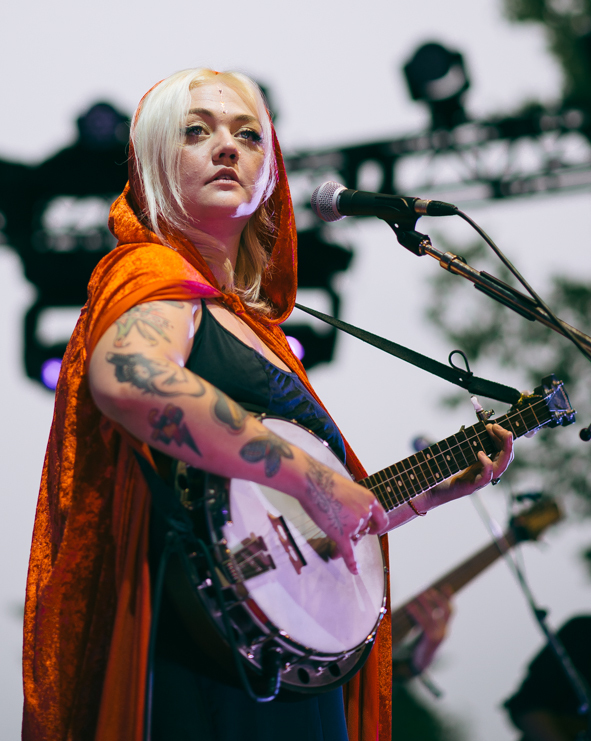
- King performing at the 2015 Interstellar Rodeo
- Born: Tanner Elle Schneider; July 3, 1989 (age 37); Los Angeles, California, U.S.
- Occupations: Singer; songwriter; musician; actress
- Years active: 1998–present
- Spouse(s): Andrew Ferguson (m. 2016; div. 2018) Dan Tooker (m. 2026)
- Children: 2
- Parents: Rob Schneider (father); London King (mother)
- Musical career
- Origin: New York City, U.S.
- Genres: Alternative country; blues rock
- Instruments: Vocals; banjo; guitar; bass; drums; piano; mandolin; dulcimer
- Works: Elle King discography
- Label: RCA
- Website: elleking.com

Signature
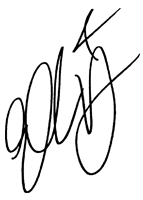

Tanner Elle Schneider (born July 3, 1989), known professionally as Elle King, is an American singer, songwriter, and actress. Her musical style is influenced by country, rock, and blues.

She signed with RCA Records to release her debut extended play, The Elle King EP (2012); one of its tracks, "Playing for Keeps", became the theme song for VH1's Mob Wives Chicago series. King's debut studio album, Love Stuff (2015) made history by being the first album to debut atop the UK Americana chart. It was led by the single "Ex's & Oh's", which peaked within the top ten of the Billboard Hot 100 and was nominated for two Grammy Awards. Her second studio album Shake the Spirit (2018), received acclaim from music critics. Her third album Come Get Your Wife (2023) included the single, "Drunk (And I Don't Wanna Go Home)", performed alongside Miranda Lambert which reached number one on the Country Airplay chart, becoming the first female duet to reach the top of the charts in almost thirty years.

Her parents are actor and comedian Rob Schneider and former model London King. She uses her mother's surname to distinguish herself and her career and identity from her father's. King is a four-time Grammy Award nominee, two each in the rock and country categories, and received honors from the Country Music Association Awards and the Academy of Country Music Awards.

== Early life ==
Tanner Elle Schneider was born on July 3, 1989, in Los Angeles County, California, to American comedian and actor Rob Schneider and American model London King. Her parents divorced when she was an infant and she and London moved to Ohio. She was raised in Columbus and Wellston. Her mother remarried Justin Tesa in 2000. When she was nine her stepfather gave her a record by all-female hard-rock band the Donnas; she views this as the pivotal moment when she decided she wanted to be a musician. Around this time, she also started listening to the Runaways and Blondie, and she made her acting debut alongside her father in the movie Deuce Bigalow: Male Gigolo.

At the age of 13, King started playing guitar, immersing herself in the music of Otis Redding, the Yeah Yeah Yeahs, Etta James, Aretha Franklin, Al Green, Hank Williams, Johnny Cash, AC/DC (she has the phrase "dirty deeds" tattooed on her biceps), and Earl Scruggs. Her interest in the country and bluegrass of Hank Williams and Earl Scruggs inspired her to learn the banjo. During her teenage years, she attended Buck's Rock camp in Connecticut, where she starred successfully in a number of musicals.

King spent her teenage years in New York City, but she has also lived in Los Angeles, Philadelphia, and Copenhagen, Denmark. Upon graduating from the Little Red School House and Elisabeth Irwin High School, she moved to Philadelphia to enroll at the University of the Arts, studying painting and film. During these college years, she had an artistic epiphany seeing a live show where the band onstage used a banjo purely for accompaniment purposes, eschewing the bluegrass and country musical vocabulary traditionally associated with the instrument. King then began to use the banjo as a compositional tool. After college, she briefly lived in Copenhagen and Los Angeles, before moving back to New York. As of January 2023, King lived in Nashville.

== Career ==
=== 1999–2013: Career beginnings ===
In 1999, she debuted as an actress in her father's film Deuce Bigalow: Male Gigolo. In 2005, at age 16, she started gigging around New York City, using a fake ID to gain entry to the local nightclubs. King immersed herself in the local songwriting scene and honed her performance skills by busking around town. King was then signed by newly appointed RCA Chairman Peter Edge. Her debut single "Good To Be A Man", was released on March 13, 2012, as a digital download and also as a 7" vinyl single. On June 12, 2012, the four-song The Elle King EP was released on RCA. The EP was recorded in New York and was produced by Andy Baldwin and Chris DeStefano, with King herself producing a track. The EP's lead track, "Playing for Keeps", was chosen as the theme song for VH1's Mob Wives Chicago series that premiered on June 10, 2012, on VH1.

King was spotlighted as an "Artist to Watch in 2012" by Esquire Magazine and made television appearances on VH1 Big Morning Buzz Live and the Late Show with David Letterman. King has played Austin, Texas, at the South by Southwest Festival, as well as the Hammersmith Apollo. She has also taped her own PBS Arts In Context special for KLRU Austin at the Austin City Limits recording studio. She toured with Of Monsters and Men, Train and Michael Kiwanuka and has opened for Dashboard Confessional, Dropkick Murphys, Dry the River, James Bay and Ed Sheeran.

=== 2014–present: Love Stuff, Shake the Spirit and Come Get Your Wife ===
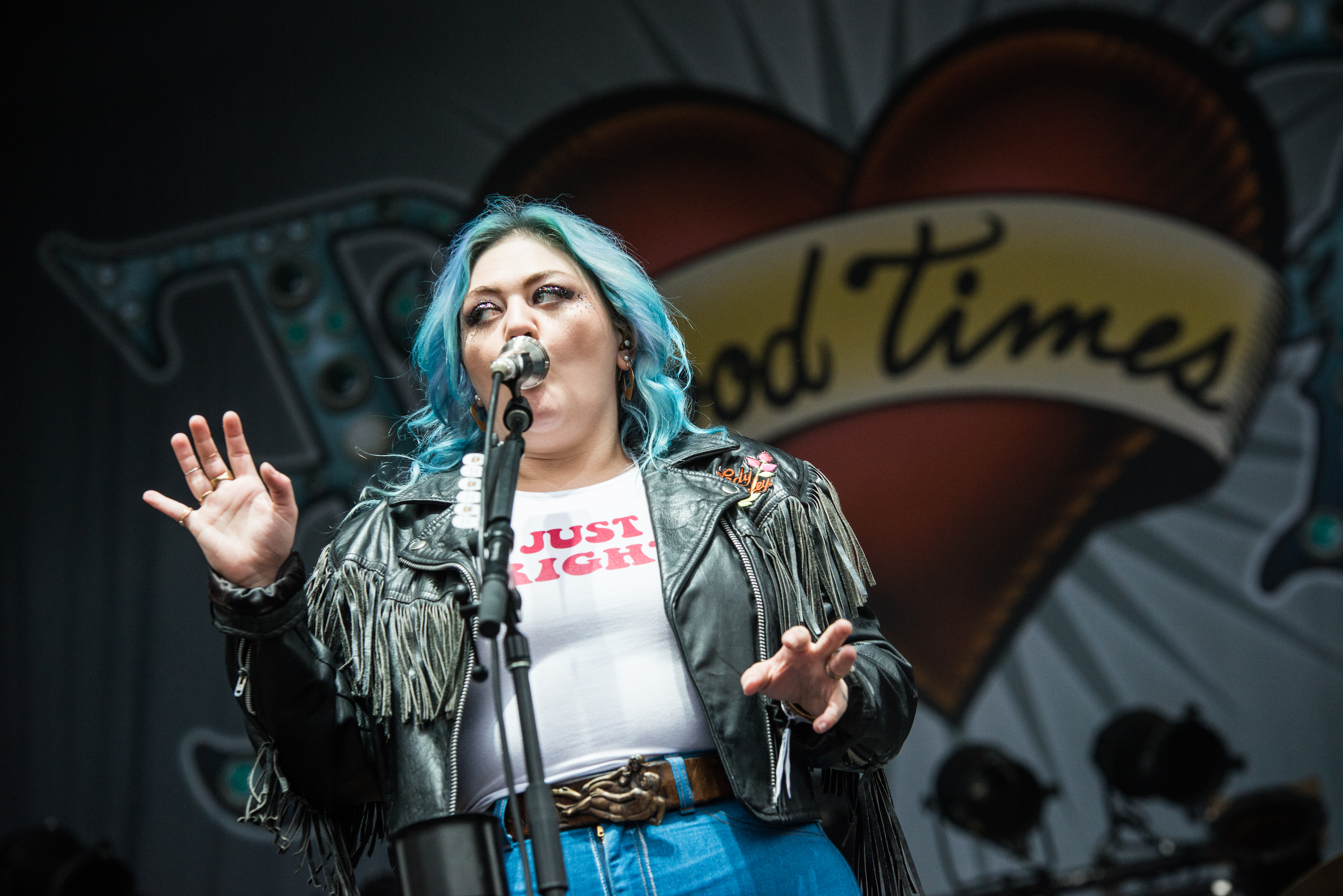
King performing in 2016

In September 2014, King released "Ex's & Oh's" as the lead single from her debut album, Love Stuff, released on February 17, 2015. She performed "Ex's & Oh's" the next day on The Today Show. The song reached number 10 on the Billboard Hot 100, becoming King's first top ten single in the United States. "Ex's & Oh's" received two nominations at the 58th Grammy Awards for Best Rock Performance and Best Rock Song. In July 2015, King supported Modest Mouse on their UK tour. "Under the Influence" and "America's Sweetheart" were later released as singles for rock radio and mainstream radio, respectively. In 2016, her single "Good Girls" was featured on the Ghostbusters soundtrack and played over the movie's credits. In 2016, she teamed up with country singer Dierks Bentley for the song "Different for Girls". They performed the song at the 50th CMA Awards on November 2, 2016, when she and Bentley won the award for Musical Event of the Year.

On March 6, 2017, she premiered new single "Wild Love" featuring a sparse electronic production, marking a slight departure from her previous style. King released her second studio album, Shake the Spirit, on October 19, 2018, which she made with her band the Brethren. On August 3, 2019, she was featured singing on a version of Lindsey Stirling's "The Upside". Throughout 2019, King served as a guest co-host on the MTV series Catfish: The TV Show opposite lead host Nev Schulman. In 2022, she featured on a remix of Canadian singer Dax's single "Dear Alcohol". In March 2022, King contributed a cover of "Feelin' Alright" (originally by Traffic and popularized by Joe Cocker, based on the arrangement of the latter version) to the soundtrack of the DreamWorks Animation crime comedy film The Bad Guys.

King's third album, Come Get Your Wife, was released on January 27, 2023, marking King’s shift into country music.

On January 19, 2024, an intoxicated King performed at the Grand Ole Opry to honor Dolly Parton's 78th birthday. The Grand Ole Opry later issued an apology.

== Musical style and influences ==
According to The Guardian, King's musical style is "steeped in every genre of vintage Americana – sassy rock'n'roll, vampy R&B, country sadness and a little blues." King's music was classified as blues rock by Nylon, and as alternative country by Alternative Nation. According to King, "I say that I sing a little bit of country blues, [...] it kind of changes from song to song, whatever I'm listening to or feeling. Sometimes it's really country, sometimes it's soulful, sometimes it's, like, wrist-slitting folk music; sad songs." She cited Etta James, Aretha Franklin, Al Green, Otis Redding, Hank Williams, Johnny Cash and AC/DC as her musical influences.

== Personal life ==
King married a Scottish man named Andrew "Fergie" Ferguson on February 14, 2016. The two met only three weeks before their wedding in a hotel lobby in London, England, and announced their engagement 12 days later. She spoke about their relationship on an episode of Say Yes to the Dress and had his name and their wedding date tattooed on her chest. Ferguson was arrested on one count of felony domestic violence on April 23, 2017, in Los Angeles County, California, and a divorce petition was filed on May 15, 2017. Criminal charges against Ferguson were later dropped and the two briefly reconciled but ended their relationship permanently in 2018.

On October 9, 2020, King became engaged to tattoo artist Dan Tooker, after dating for one year. She gave birth to their son Lucky Levi Tooker on September 1, 2021. On March 25, 2024, King revealed that the relationship had ended. They later reconciled and on February 28, 2025, had a second son named Royal Tooker. They married in October 2026.

King has 55 tattoos, including one of a snake on her neck and the word "brethren" in cursive on her buttock. She told Kate Branch of Vogue in 2018 that she got her first tattoo when she was 14 years old. She once worked at a tattoo company called East Side Ink.

In August 2024, King discussed her childhood and her relationship with her father Rob Schneider on an episode of Bunnie Xo's podcast Dumb Blonde. She described her relationship with Schneider as an "ebb and flow" and said at that point, the two were "not flowing." On growing up with Schneider, she said she would spend summers with him on film sets but they rarely spent time together as he was working. She refused to spend summers with him after he sent her to weight loss camp. She also mentioned that Schneider would often forget her birthday and that she did not agree with his then-recent comments about women, transgender people, and vaccines. Schneider later issued a public apology to her during an interview with Tucker Carlson, saying he loved her and he hoped she could forgive him for his shortcomings as a father. In response, King said that her father apologizing on Carlson's show is "like a double negative... means nothing."

== Discography ==
Studio albums

- Love Stuff (2015)
- Shake the Spirit (2018)
- Come Get Your Wife (2023)

== Filmography ==
=== Film ===
Year	Title	Role	Notes
1999	Deuce Bigalow: Male Gigolo	Cookie Girl	
2006	The Benchwarmers	Carol	
2009	Wild Cherry	Sabrina	
2015	The Last Playlist	Herself	Documentary
2020	Rob Schneider: Asian Momma, Mexican Kids	Herself	Performing "In Dreams" by Roy Orbison
2020	Love, Weddings & Other Disasters	Jordan	
2022	Daddy Daughter Trip	Female Farmer	

=== Television ===
Year	Title	Role	Notes
2017	Say Yes to The Dress	Herself	Episode: "10 Years Later and Busier Than Ever!"
2019, 2023	Catfish: The TV Show	Co-host	2 episodes: "Alice and Nique" & "Sasha and Essence"
2020	Pete the Cat	Garnet Gator	Episode: "The Gators"
2026	Nation's Dumbest	Herself	Season 1 participant

== Concert tours ==
=== Headlining ===
- Love Stuff Tour (2015)
- Shake The Spirit Tour (2019)
- A-FREAKIN-MEN Tour (2022)

=== Opening act ===
- Dashboard Confessional – The Swiss Army Romance (2010)
- Of Monsters and Men – My Head Is an Animal Tour (2011)
- Train – California 37 Tour (2012)
- Michael Kiwanuka – Home Again Tour (2012)
- Dropkick Murphys – Signed and Sealed in Blood Tour (2013)
- Ed Sheeran – + Tour (2013)
- Dry the River – Alarms in the Heart Tour (2014)
- James Bay – Chaos and the Calm Tour (2015)
- Modest Mouse – Strangers to Ourselves Tour (2015)
- Maroon 5 – Maroon V Tour (2016)
- Dixie Chicks – DCX MMXVI World Tour (2016)
- Miranda Lambert – Roadside Bars and Pink Guitars Tour (2019)
- Joan Jett & Heart – Love Alive Tour (2019)
- Chris Stapleton - Chris Stapleton's All-American Road Show (2022)
- Melissa Etheridge - Summer Tour (2023)
- Cyndi Lauper - Girls Just Want To Have Fun Farewell Tour; Columbus, Ohio (2024)
- Eric Church - Free The Machine Tour (2025)

== Awards and nominations ==
Year	Awards	Category	Recipient	Outcome	Ref.
2016	Grammy Awards	Best Rock Performance	"Ex's & Oh's"	Nominated	
2016	Grammy Awards	Best Rock Song	"Ex's & Oh's"	Nominated	
2016	iHeartRadio Music Awards	Alternative Rock Song of the Year	"Ex's & Oh's"	Nominated	
2016	Teen Choice Awards	Choice Rock Song	"America's Sweetheart"	Nominated	
2016	Country Music Association Awards	Musical Event of the Year	"Different for Girls" (with Dierks Bentley)	Won	
2017	Grammy Awards	Best Country Duo/Group Performance	"Different for Girls" (with Dierks Bentley)	Nominated	
2017	Academy of Country Music Awards	Music Event of the Year	"Different for Girls" (with Dierks Bentley)	Nominated	
2017	CMT Music Awards	Video of the Year	"Different for Girls" (with Dierks Bentley)	Nominated	
2017	CMT Music Awards	Collaborative Video of the Year	"Different for Girls" (with Dierks Bentley)	Nominated	
2017	Billboard Music Awards	Top Country Collaboration	"Different for Girls" (with Dierks Bentley)	Nominated	
2020	Academy of Country Music Awards	Music Event of the Year	"Fooled Around and Fell in Love" (with Caylee Hammack, Miranda Lambert, Ashley McBryde, Maren Morris, and Tenille Townes)	Won	
2020	Country Music Association Awards	Musical Event of the Year	"Fooled Around and Fell in Love" (with Caylee Hammack, Miranda Lambert, Ashley McBryde, Maren Morris, and Tenille Townes)	Nominated	
2021	Country Music Association Awards	Musical Event of the Year	"Drunk (And I Don't Wanna Go Home)" (with Miranda Lambert)	Nominated	
2022	Grammy Awards	Best Country Duo/Group Performance	"Drunk (And I Don't Wanna Go Home)" (with Miranda Lambert)	Nominated	
