= Ghostbusters: Legion =

2004 limited series

- Cover art to Ghostbusters: Legion #1. Art by Steve Kurth.

Publication information
- Publisher: 88MPH Studios
- Schedule: Monthly
- Format: Mini-series
- Publication date: February 2004 to January 2005
- No. of issues: 4
- Main character(s): Ghostbusters and principal cast from the 1984 film

Creative team
- Written by: Andrew Dabb
- Penciller: Steve Kurth
- Inker: Serge LaPointe
- Colorist: Kevin Senft-"Blond"

Collected editions
- Ghostbusters: Legion: ISBN 1-84576-075-1

Ghostbusters: Legion is a 2004 comic book mini-series published by the Quebec-based publisher, 88MPH Studios run by Canadian Sebastien Clavet. It was written by Andrew Dabb, with pencils by Steve Kurth and inks by Serge LaPointe. The series ran 4 issues from February through May 2004. It was collected as a hardcover collection in 2005 by 88MPH and was supposed to be released via a Diamond Comic Distributors "Previews" exclusive. However, the hardcover never came to pass due to the company's financial problems. It was reprinted as a softcover trade paperback that year, for the UK market by the British Titan Books.

A proposed follow up series from the same comic publisher was announced but ultimately cancelled.

== Synopsis ==
Legion saw the return of the four Ghostbusters and the principal cast from the movie. Set six months on from the Gozer incident the series was designed to follow the Ghostbusters as their initial fame faded and they returned to the regular chore of busting ghosts on a daily basis. The series sees the team run ragged as a spate of supernatural crimes and other related occurrences plague the city.

=== Main characters ===
- Dr. Peter Venkman: A wisecracking ladies' man with little apparent interest in the scientific side of the company. While he is usually outwardly sarcastic and lazy, it masks a deeper dedication to both the job and his friends. Despite having an ongoing relationship with cellist Dana Barrett, he is concerned that not only are they growing apart romantically, but also that he is being overshadowed by über geek Louis Tully.
- Dr. Ray Stantz: An emotional but highly intelligent young man, Ray is possibly the only member to put his full heart into both the company and the job, often seeking enjoyment from the variety of entities and situations they encounter. However, during the events of the story he is quickly becoming disillusioned with both himself and their stance as proponents of a defense science.
- Dr. Egon Spengler: The brains behind the operation, Egon is the scientific mind that keeps the equipment functional and is instrumental to solving the mystery in Legion.
- Winston Zeddemore: Still an everyman but with a greater character development from the film, Winston is still finding himself asking a lot of questions, specifically in relation to the three founding Ghostbusters' pasts.
- Janine Melnitz: Janine returns pretty much unchanged, she is still pursuing a romantic involvement with Egon and has remained at opposites with Peter, to the point of a welcome return of the verbal sparring which made the pair an interesting dynamic on The Real Ghostbusters cartoon series.
- Dana Barrett: Following the events of the first movie, Dana has pursued a shaky relationship with Peter. Despite their feelings for each other, their relationship is in the lurch and whether it will survive with their work commitments and outside forces remains to be seen.
- Louis Tully: By far the most successful of the group. While the fame the Ghostbusters received is fading, Louis has become a media darling following the explosion at Gozer's temple. Featuring at charity events, draped in women and receiving many requests for autographs, it would appear that Louis is content with his rich bachelor lifestyle. However, it would appear that his splurging out on expensive baubles and surrounding himself with beautiful women might be masking something deeper and darker.
- Michael Draverhaven: A dark and dirty secret from Peter, Ray and Egon's collective pasts. A former colleague who had been held within a psychiatric institution in Albany, his unsettled and unstable mind may be hiding the clues to revealing the final outcome in the Legion storyline.

== Production ==
- Andrew Dabb: Series Writer
- Steve Kurth: Series Artist
- Serge LaPointe: Series Inker (With additional work from Chuck Gibson, Michel Lacombe, Ulises Grostieta and Marco Galli
- "Blond" AKA Kevin Senft: Series Colourist
- Ed Dukeshire: Series Letterer
- Sebastien Clavet: Editor and Owner of 88MPH Studios

=== Publishing ===
The following were the intended release dates for the four part Legion series as well as the expected ongoing monthly comic book series.

- Ghostbusters: Legion (1 of 4) – February 2004
- Ghostbusters: Legion (2 of 4) – March 2004
- Ghostbusters: Legion (3 of 4) – April 2004
- Ghostbusters: Legion (4 of 4) – May 2004
- Ghostbusters Ongoing #1 – June 2004
- Ghostbusters Ongoing #2 – July 2004
- Ghostbusters Ongoing #3 – August 2004

=== Delays ===
Cover to issue one of the unpublished ongoing series.

One of the commonly related problems experienced with the Legion miniseries, and often cited as the reason for the dramatic drop in sales after the first issue, as well as a source of fan grievance, were the extended delays that affected the series. The delays were so severe that issues drifted months from their release dates.

- Ghostbusters: Legion (1 of 4) – February 2004 (Released April 2004) TOP 300 Rank #170 Est. Sales 9000
- Ghostbusters: Legion (2 of 4) – March 2004 (Released July 2004) TOP 300 Rank #182 Est. Sales 7900
- Ghostbusters: Legion (3 of 4) – April 2004 (Released November 2004) TOP 300 Rank #235 Est. Sales 3600
- Ghostbusters: Legion (4 of 4) – May 2004 (Released January 2005) TOP 300 Rank #151 Est. Sales 6900

Note: Sales numbers off of Diamond Comics' Distributions Top 300 ranked comics. These do not include the Dan Brereton variant covers for the 4 issues. If included, would make the order/sales numbers a little higher.

=== 0 Issue ===
Originally intended as a 0 issue to have been released before Legion, the one shot story The Zeddemore Factor was later released as a convention exclusive at the San Diego Comic-Con stall operated by 88MPH Studios to help promote the comic.

== Financial problems ==
Reported but unconfirmed financial issues had apparently plagued the series as well. While these may have possibly led to delays, sources claimed that inker Chuck Gibson and colorist Adam Nichols (who coloured the convention trade The Zeddemore Factor) had been unpaid for their work on the comics. As of this writing, Adam Nichols and Chuck Gibson have both been paid for their work.

== Ongoing series ==
Originally planned for a June 2004 release to coincide with the 20th Anniversary of the movie, the ongoing series of the comic was to officially start in the Summer of 2004 with three known stories. The following synopses have been collected from the official site:

- Ghostbusters Monthly #1 – In June 1984, GHOSTBUSTERS exploded into theaters and captivated a generation. Twenty years later, the boys are back in a brand-new ONGOING comic book series. Now that they’ve saved the world twice, the Ghostbusters want to go global…but that’s easier said than done. Meanwhile, a dead man is wandering the streets of New York and something wicked stirs in the Central Park Zoo. Old foes, new enemies and trusty unlicensed nuclear accelerators, this exciting first issue has it all. Because even after two decades, you know who to call.
- Ghostbusters Monthly #2 – Romance is in the air as Egon and Janine go out on their first official date, and with Peter playing the role of Cyrano things are bound to get interesting. Meanwhile, Winston goes solo, Louis gets an unwelcome visit from an old friend, and Ray takes a trip to a dark, dangerous place…the library.
- Ghostbusters Monthly #3 – With the powerful ghost known as Ahriman making trouble and Vinz Clortho back for an encore, the Ghostbusters find themselves racing from one disaster to the next. And that’s before things get really bad. It turns out there's one thing worse than having two evil spirits rampaging through New York; when they get together.

== Influences ==
The mini-series in overall design and quality has borrowed extensively from the original movies as reference for the technology and science behind Ghostbusters. While some things have been changed for obvious reasons (such as the characters, to avoid additional licensing fees) the following items have been retained true to the movies: The Firehouse (In reality the Hook & Ladder No. 8 FDNY company which served as the Ghostbusters' headquarters (Exterior) in both movies), Proton Packs, Ghost trap, PKE Meter, and Ecto-1.

However, there were some small changes made to the series. The most notable was the Containment Unit which had a design inspired by its counterpart in The Real Ghostbusters and Extreme Ghostbusters.

Clavet's reasoning behind the change in the Firehouse basement and the Containment Unit is commonly put down to a similar reason used by many fan writers: that a larger basement and containment system would allow for a larger collection of ghosts and a better containment system to be developed. Clavet had also admitted that he liked the design of the Containment Unit in the cartoon and that it seemed like a reasonable development.

An additional reference for The Real Ghostbusters fans was seen in Legion #2, which featured Egon Spengler 'doing his hair crazy'. His 'crazy' hair resembled the style worn by his cartoon counterpart in The Real Ghostbusters. The jumpsuits also had a slight revision as well. Unlike the cartoon, the color of the uniform remained the same. The yellow tubing on the left side was removed however.

The cover of the Second Printing Edition of Legion #1, featuring Ecto-1 borrowed heavy inspiration from the film poster of the movie Christine, a stated favorite of Clavet's.

== Design ==
Before all of the angles of the comic series had been finalised, a series of design sketches prepared for by comic artist Mark Brooks depicted a series of renderings for the proposed designs of the four principal characters.

Despite still wearing tan suits, the designs featured heavy inspiration from The Real Ghostbusters cartoon, to the point of having Egon with blond hair and featuring the 'funnel' style haircut; a red haired overweight Ray Stantz, and cartoon styled and coloured equipment. An amusing caricature featured the design for Winston being larger and more solidly built then the other three Ghostbusters, spawning the popular and often referenced phrase 'Winston SMASH!' due to his Hulk like appearance.

Clavet mentioned that Brooks (at the time only mentioned as 'El Diablo', his popular internet nickname), would not be working on the full series.

After a period, a set of final designs were released of the four Ghostbusters as drawn by artist Billy Dallas Patton. The characters were more realistically proportioned then the 'El Diablo' concepts but they did feature specific facial styling which led to them being referred to as 'Disney-esque' designs. It is Patton's character designs that were featured on the poster on the right.

Ghostbusters: Legion poster

Patton only remained with the series for one issue, leaving apparently due to medical issues at the time. His work exists solely as the four rendered character shots and the one-shot story, The Zeddemore Factor.

Following Patton's departure, Steve Kurth was hired to much applause within the fan community. In the promotional period for Legion teaser pictures of Slimer and The Stay Puft Marshmallow Man were released showing more of the artist's style.

In 2005, Adam Nichols was hired to colour The Zeddemore Factor and provided an alternate but also respected colouring style to the rich colours in the miniseries which had been crafted by colourist 'Blond'.

== Licensing issues ==
One of the most widely publicized licensing issues to date pertains to the use of Ecto-1, the modified 1959 Cadillac ambulance used as the pursuit/transportation vehicle by the Ghostbusters. It would appear from Clavet's comments that the fees involved with the licensing for the vehicle chassis from General Motors has caused him to take careful consideration in regards to the inclusion of the vehicle. He has made mention of plans for an alternate car, should he be unable to utilize the original design.

Fans had been divided on the proposed idea; many expressed willingness in the hope that they could still have a comic while others have voiced dissatisfaction that such an iconic vehicle might be lost from the property.

== Covers ==
During the run of Legion, a large series of covers were released for the comic. Cited as one of the other major complaints of the series was the overuse of variant issues. Despite this, the selection of covers has proven an unusual and unique collection.

Ghostbusters: Legion (1 of 4) featured 6 different covers:

- Regular cover of the four Ghostbusters in a ruined, slimey environment by regular art team.
- Variant painted cover of Dr. Peter Venkman by artist Dan Brereton.
- Retailer Incentive cover of the Ghostbusters logo, using ultraviolet inks.
- Graham Crackers Comics Exclusive Edition featuring Peter Venkman and Stay Puft by regular art team.
- Toyzz Exclusive Edition of Vinz Clortho (Terror Dog) by regular art team.
- Second Printing Edition of Ecto-1 by regular art team.

Ghostbusters: Legion (2 of 4) featured 2 different covers:

- Regular cover of the four Ghostbusters surrounded by a legion of ghosts, watched over by a psychotic Michael Draverhaven.
- Variant painted cover of Winston Zeddemore by artist Dan Brereton.

Ghostbusters: Legion (3 of 4) featured 2 different covers:

- Regular cover of slime covered equipment.
- Variant Painted cover of Dr. Ray Stantz by artist Dan Brereton.

Ghostbusters: Legion (4 of 4) featured 3 different covers:

- Regular cover of the four Ghostbusters in Ecto-1, evading a legion of ghosts.
- Variant Painted cover of Dr. Egon Spengler by artist Dan Brereton.
- Bulldog Collectibles Exclusive Edition of Egon Spengler being overshadowed by a large, spectral bulldog.

== Promotional artwork ==
Prior to be released, the miniseries featured 5 pieces of promotional artwork featuring all 4 Ghostbusters. Two other pieces of promotional artwork were also featured on the back of the comic books once the miniseries had begun :A promo of a melting Stay Puft featuring the phrase "S'mores Anyone?" A Promo of Slimer featuring the phrase "Vermin Problems?"

A special 'Christmas card' was created specially for the site, drawn by well-known Ghostbusters prop member Sean Bishop and coloured by one of the comic production staff.

== Collected editions ==
In early 2005 Sebastien Clavet announced the official trade collection of the series which would include a coloured version of The Zeddemore Factor one shot, concept art, 'Ecto-Logs', a foreword by Ghostbusters creator Dan Aykroyd and a proposed afterword by an as yet unknown actor related to the film. The cut-off date for pre-orders was extended several times, while a firm release date had never been announced.

However, it would appear that financial problems have plagued this venture despite hundreds of paid pre-orders. Clavet has since closed his own company's message boards and removed contact information from 88MPH Studios website, leaving many disgruntled fans to level claims of fraud against Clavet.

Presently, a version of the Legion Trade in Soft Cover has been released for commercial purchase. Although it includes all 4 regular issues (with a cover gallery) and a colorized version of The Zeddemore Factor, it lacks the foreword by Aykroyd and the concept art. The book is available in the United Kingdom and was published by Titan Books (ISBN 1845760751).

A post made on January 14, 2007 on the new 88MPH Studios website states that pre-orders placed with them and Graham crackers are guaranteed and that more information will be posted shortly. Posts entered onto the Weaver Hall forum on January 17 reference Clavet's intent to offer the hardcover to fans via the 88MPH Studios online store (a feature which is still unavailable.

A subsequent notice on the 88MPH Studios website directed those who wished to change their shipping address for the hardcover to click on a button marked Update which can be found in the site navigation panel. The page accessed through this link gives an explanation to the 88MPH customer as to how they can change their shipping details. In addition to this the page contains a notice that the deadline for updating an address is August 31, 2007. The sentence after the closing date announcement states that "Legion ships in Fall 2007", which as of May 2016 has still yet to occur. It is likely they have officially lost the license for Ghostbusters now that IDW Publishing has begun publishing their own licensed Ghostbusters comics, Ghostbusters: The Other Side, and the closing of the 88MPH Studios website and the message board.

== See also ==
- List of comics based on films
