= Ghostbusters (franchise) =

American media franchise

- Official franchise logo
- Created by: Dan Aykroyd; Harold Ramis
- Original work: Ghostbusters (1984)
- Owner: Sony Pictures
- Years: 1984–present

Print publications
- Comics: List of comics

Films and television
- Films: Original series; Ghostbusters (1984); Ghostbusters II (1989); Ghostbusters: Afterlife (2021); Ghostbusters: Frozen Empire (2024); Reboot; Ghostbusters (2016)
- Animated series: The Real Ghostbusters (1986–1991); Extreme Ghostbusters (1997)

Games
- Video games: List of video games

Audio
- Soundtracks: Ghostbusters (1984); Ghostbusters II (1989); Ghostbusters (2016); Ghostbusters: Afterlife (2021); Ghostbusters: Frozen Empire (2024)
- Original music: "Ghostbusters" "On Our Own" "Good Girls" "Girls Talk Boys"

Ghostbusters is an American supernatural comedy film franchise, based on an original concept created by Dan Aykroyd and Harold Ramis in 1984. The premise follows a group of eccentric New York City parapsychologists who investigate and eliminate ghosts, paranormal manifestations, demigods and demons. The franchise has expanded with licensed action figures, books, comics, video games, television series, theme park attractions and other branded merchandise. Bill Murray, Dan Aykroyd, Ernie Hudson and Annie Potts are the only actors to have appeared in all five films in the Ghostbusters franchise.

== Setting ==
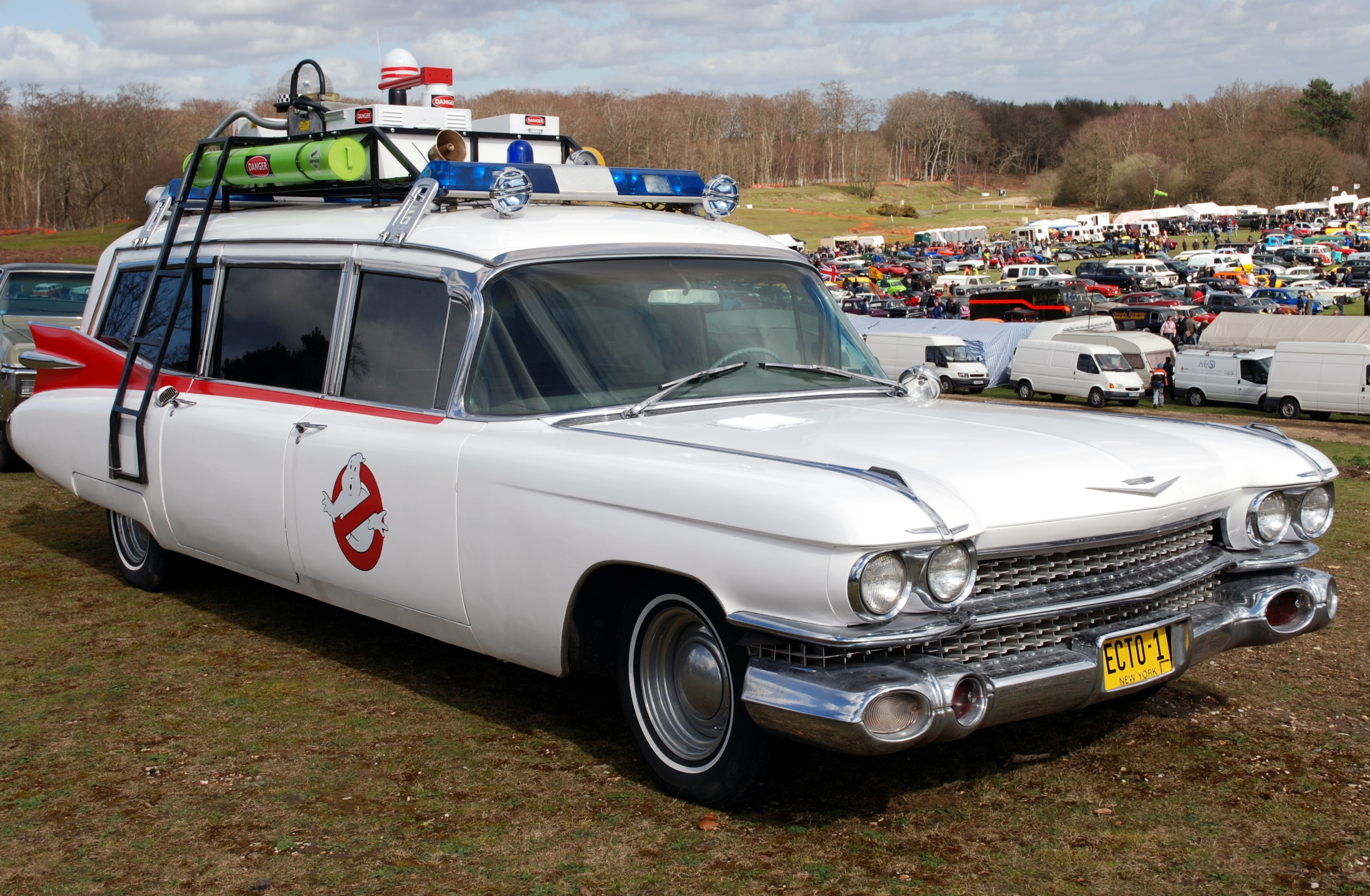
Ghostbusters Ectomobile – Cadillac Miller-Meteor

=== Technology ===
The Ghostbusters use a specialized set of equipment in the 1984 film, and all subsequent Ghostbusters fiction includes similar equipment to aid in the capture and containment of ghosts. Their equipment includes proton packs, used to subdue ghosts; ghost traps, used to capture ghosts; and P.K.E. meters, handheld devices used to detect psychokinetic energy. In addition to the main technology used in the series, a script draft for Ghostbusters III includes the Ghostbusters developing a machine to transport themselves to an alternate Manhattan to save New York.

== Films ==
Film	U.S. release date	Director	Screenwriters	Producer(s)
Original series
Ghostbusters	June 8, 1984	Ivan Reitman	Dan Aykroyd & Harold Ramis	Ivan Reitman
Ghostbusters II	June 16, 1989	Ivan Reitman	Dan Aykroyd & Harold Ramis	Ivan Reitman
Ghostbusters: Afterlife	November 19, 2021	Jason Reitman	Gil Kenan & Jason Reitman	Ivan Reitman
Ghostbusters: Frozen Empire	March 22, 2024	Gil Kenan	Gil Kenan & Jason Reitman	Ivan Reitman, Jason Reitman & Jason Blumenfeld
Reboot
Ghostbusters	July 15, 2016	Paul Feig	Paul Feig & Katie Dippold	Amy Pascal & Ivan Reitman

=== Original series ===
==== Ghostbusters (1984) ====
Ghostbusters, the first film in the series, is a 1984 sci-fi comedy film about three New York City scientists. After they are fired from Columbia University, they start their own business investigating and capturing ghosts. Starring Bill Murray, Dan Aykroyd, Harold Ramis, Rick Moranis, Sigourney Weaver, Annie Potts, and Ernie Hudson, it was released in the United States on June 8, 1984. It had been made on a US$30 million budget, but it grossed approximately US$240 million in the United States and over US$50 million abroad during its theatrical run, more than the domestic gross of the second Indiana Jones installment, making it the most successful film in America that year (after re-releases), and one of the most successful comedies of the 1980s. The American Film Institute ranked it 28th in its list of the top 100 comedies of all time. IGN voted Ghostbusters the greatest comedy ever in 2005. The TV Channel Bravo ranked Ghostbusters number 28 on their 100 Funniest Movies list in 2006.

==== Ghostbusters II (1989) ====
The second film, Ghostbusters II, was released on June 16, 1989. Taking place five years after the first, the Ghostbusters have lost their credibility due to the amount of property damage they have caused, but identify a new threat to New York City after discovering a river of ectoplasmic slime that reacts to the great deal of negative emotions within the city. Murray, Aykroyd, Ramis, Hudson, Weaver, Potts, and Moranis reprised their roles from the first film, and were joined by Peter MacNicol and Wilhelm von Homburg, among others. After the success of the first film and the animated series The Real Ghostbusters, Columbia Pictures pressed the producers to make a sequel. Aykroyd, Ramis, and Reitman were uncomfortable with this at first, as the original film was intended to be conclusive and they wished to work on other projects. Eventually, they agreed and created a script. The sequel grossed US$215 million against a US$37 million budget, but received mixed reviews compared to the first film.

==== Ghostbusters: Afterlife (2021) ====
The third film, Ghostbusters: Afterlife, was released on November 19, 2021. Taking place thirty-two years after the second, the Ghostbusters have disbanded and their legacy is mostly forgotten. A single mother and her children move to an Oklahoma farm they inherited from her estranged father, Egon Spengler, who went on a mission to prevent an apocalypse. The film was directed by Jason Reitman, son of original director Ivan Reitman, with a script co-written by himself and Gil Kenan, while Ivan Reitman served as a producer. The cast includes Mckenna Grace, Finn Wolfhard, Carrie Coon and Paul Rudd, and were joined by Logan Kim and Celeste O'Connor, among others. Additionally, Murray, Aykroyd, Hudson, Potts and Weaver appear in supporting roles, reprising their characters from the first two films. The film received mixed reviews, but was a commercial success, earning $204 million on a $75 million budget.

==== Ghostbusters: Frozen Empire (2024) ====
The fourth film, Ghostbusters: Frozen Empire, was released on March 22, 2024. Taking place three years after the third, the Spengler family decide to leave Summerville, Oklahoma, and go back to where it all started – the iconic New York City firehouse – and help the original Ghostbusters, who have developed a top-secret research lab to take busting ghosts to the next level. But when the discovery of an ancient artifact unleashes an evil force, Ghostbusters new and old must join forces to protect their home and save the world from a second Ice Age. The film was directed by Gil Kenan, with a script co-written by himself and Jason Reitman, while Reitman served as a producer. Grace, Wolfhard, Coon, Rudd, Kim and O'Connor reprise their roles from Afterlife, and were joined by Kumail Nanjiani, and Patton Oswalt, among others. Murray, Aykroyd, Hudson, Potts and Atherton appear in supporting roles, reprising their characters from the previous films. The film received mixed reviews, and grossed $202 million on a $100 million budget.

=== Reboot ===
==== Ghostbusters (2016) ====
The 2016 film, Ghostbusters, is a relaunch of the franchise which takes place in an alternate universe, featuring a new cast of characters, but follows a similar narrative as the original film. A group of eccentric researchers make discoveries within paranormal incidents with their intentions being to detect and capture ghosts, and protect New York City from those spirits. The film principally features a new cast, starring Kristen Wiig, Melissa McCarthy, Leslie Jones and Kate McKinnon as the all-female Ghostbuster team, along with Chris Hemsworth as their male receptionist. Additionally, Aykroyd, Murray, Weaver, Hudson, and Potts all had small cameo roles. The film was released on July 15, 2016, as Ghostbusters, with the home media released being rebranded to Ghostbusters: Answer the Call. It received mixed reviews, and grossed US$229 million off a US$144 million budget, after accounting for marketing, a $70 million loss.

=== Future ===
==== Untitled animated film ====
In October 2015, Ivan Reitman announced that he was producing an animated film for Sony Pictures Animation, with Fletcher Moules attached to the project as both animator and director. The film will tell a story from the perspective of ghosts. The film would begin production following the completion and release of Ghostbusters: Afterlife. The project was reconfirmed in June 2022, with Jennifer Kluska and Chris Prynoski as directors and Brenda Hsueh as the writer of the film. In December 2024, it was announced that Kris Pearn would serve as director, with the project set to be released on Netflix.

==== Potential spin-off film ====
In December 2014, the Sony Pictures hack revealed that an action comedy spin-off film, centered around another team of Ghostbusters was in development. Channing Tatum, Reid Carolin, and the Russo brothers pitched the movie to the studio, and was confirmed to supplement and be in development simultaneously with Paul Feig's Ghostbusters: Answer the Call, and intended to be the first installment in a series of films inspired by Christopher Nolan's The Dark Knight Trilogy. Tatum was being courted to star in the film, with Chris Pratt viewed as his potential co-star. By March 2015, the film was officially confirmed to be in active-development. Written by Drew Pearce, the film was seen as an expansion of the Ghostbusters multiverse. Ivan Reitman described its development as being in line with the plans and production bible that they had created thirty years prior during the original film; the purpose of the project was "to build the Ghostbusters into the universe it always promised it might become". Joe and Anthony Russo were in early negotiations to direct the film. Ivan Reitman, the Russo brothers, Channing Tatum, Reid Carolin, and Peter Kiernan were to serve as producers. By June however, Tatum confirmed that the project had been delayed in favor of other projects.

In February 2022, Phil Lord and Christopher Miller announced that they had been attached to the project during its development stages, also saying that there is still potential at the studio that the film will be green-lit in the future.

==== Untitled Ghostbusters: Frozen Empire sequel (TBA) ====
In February 2024, Kenan revealed that ideas for multiple future films in the Ghostbusters franchise had been discussed. Kenan specifically mentioned the Mini-Pufts storyline as something he and Reitman would like to expand upon. The Mini-Pufts are featured in the film's post-credits scene.

In October 2024, Kenan confirmed that a sequel to Frozen Empire was in development.

== Television ==
Series	Season	Episodes	First released	Last released	Network/Platform
The Real Ghostbusters	7	140	September 13, 1986	October 5, 1991	ABC, Broadcast syndication
Extreme Ghostbusters	1	40	September 1, 1997	December 4, 1997	Broadcast syndication
Ghostbusters: Night Shift	TBA	TBA	2027	TBA	Netflix

=== The Real Ghostbusters (1986–1991) ===
From 1986 to 1991, Columbia Pictures Television and DIC Entertainment produced an animated spin-off television series created by Harold Ramis and Dan Aykroyd, entitled The Real Ghostbusters. "The Real" was added to the title due to a dispute with Filmation and its Ghostbusters properties. The series continues the adventures of paranormal investigators Venkman, Stantz, Spengler, Zeddemore, their secretary Melnitz, and their mascot ghost Slimer. The Real Ghostbusters was nominated for an Emmy. At the start of the fourth season in 1988, the show was retitled to Slimer! and the Real Ghostbusters. It aired in a one-hour time slot, which the show had begun doing under its original name earlier that same year on January 30, 1988. In addition to the regular 30-minute Real Ghostbusters episode, a half-hour Slimer! sub-series was added that included two to three short animated segments focusing on the character Slimer. Animation for the Slimer! cartoons was handled by Wang Film Productions. At the end of its seven-season run, 147 episodes had aired, including the syndicated episodes and 13 episodes of Slimer!, with multiple episodes airing out of production order.

=== Extreme Ghostbusters (1997) ===
Extreme Ghostbusters was a sequel and spin-off of The Real Ghostbusters that aired in late 1997. The 40-episode series initially aired on the syndicated Bohbot Kids Network's "Extreme Block", and featured a team of college-aged Ghostbusters led by veteran Ghostbuster Egon Spengler. In some TV listings, the series was called Ghostbusters Dark.

=== Future ===
==== Ghostbusters: Night Shift (2027) ====
An animated streaming television series by Netflix was announced in June 2022. The series will be produced by Jason Reitman and Gil Kenan, both who produced Ghostbusters: Afterlife, and as a production of Ghost Corps, Netflix Animation Studios & Sony Pictures Animation. Writing for the series had begun by March 2024. In August 2024, the series was greenlit at Netflix with Elliott Kalan joining as writer and executive producer and was revealed to be CG animated with its tone being expected to be similar to Ghostbusters: Afterlife and Ghostbusters: Frozen Empire. In April 2025, it was announced that the series would be animated by Flying Bark Productions. On May 7, 2026, it was announced that the series will be released in 2027. The series' title was revealed as Ghostbusters: Night Shift on June 6, 2026.

==== Ghostbusters: Ecto Force (TBA) ====
In June 2016, a new animated series titled Ghostbusters: Ecto Force was announced to be in development, with an initial targeted release of early-2018. The series was to be set in the year 2050, following a new team of Ghostbusters who capture ghosts from around the world. In August 2017, Reitman revealed that the series had been postponed to prioritize development on the planned Ghostbusters animated spin-off film.

==== Untitled prequel series ====
In May 2019, Aykroyd said that he wrote a prequel script with the production title of Ghostbusters High, and that there are two follow-up projects to Ghostbusters: Afterlife in development. The prequel will explore New Jersey during 1969, when the primary characters first met as teenagers. The project is being considered alternatively for a television series, with Jason Reitman involved with its development. Aykroyd stated that he envisions the project as "a perfect button on all [the filmmakers have] done up to that point".

== Main cast and characters ==
List indicators

This section includes characters who will appear or have appeared in multiple installments in the franchise.

- An empty grey cell indicates the character was not in the film, or that the character's official presence has not yet been confirmed.
- ^{A} indicates an appearance through archival footage or audio.
- ^{C} indicates a cameo role.
- ^{U} indicates an uncredited appearance.
- ^{V} indicates a voice-only role.
- ^{M} indicates a model with the actor or actress's likeness served as a body double.
- ^{L} indicates the actor or actress lent only their likeness for the film.

Character	Original series					Animated series		Video games			Reboot
Character	Ghostbusters	Ghostbusters II	Ghostbusters: Afterlife	Ghostbusters: Frozen Empire	Untitled Ghostbusters sequel	The Real Ghostbusters	Extreme Ghostbusters	Ghostbusters: The Video Game	Ghostbusters: Spirits Unleashed	Ghostbusters: Rise of the Ghost Lord	Ghostbusters
Character	1984	1989	2021	2024	TBA	1986–1991	1997	2009	2022	2023	2016
=== Primary cast ===
Dr. Peter Venkman	Bill Murray	Bill Murray	Bill Murray	Bill Murray	TBA	Lorenzo Music^{V} Dave Coulier^{V}	Dave Coulier^{V}	Bill Murray^{V}			
Dr. Raymond "Ray" Stantz	Dan Aykroyd	Dan Aykroyd	Dan Aykroyd	Dan Aykroyd	TBA	Frank Welker^{V}	Frank Welker^{V}	Dan Aykroyd^{V}	Dan Aykroyd^{V}	Dan Aykroyd^{V}	
Dr. Egon Spengler	Harold Ramis	Harold Ramis	Harold Ramis^{L} Bob Gunton^{M} Ivan Reitman^{M}	Harold Ramis^{A}		Maurice LaMarche^{V}	Maurice LaMarche^{V}	Harold Ramis^{V}			Bronze head bust
Dr. Winston Zeddemore	Ernie Hudson	Ernie Hudson	Ernie Hudson	Ernie Hudson	TBA	Arsenio Hall^{V} Buster Jones^{V}	Buster Jones^{V}	Ernie Hudson^{V}	Ernie Hudson^{V}		
Janine Melnitz	Annie Potts	Annie Potts	Annie Potts	Annie Potts	TBA	Laura Summer^{V} Kath Soucie^{V}	Pat Musick^{V}	Annie Potts^{V}			
Dana Barrett-Venkman	Sigourney Weaver	Sigourney Weaver	Sigourney Weaver^{C}		TBA						
Louis Tully	Rick Moranis	Rick Moranis			TBA	Roger Bumpass^{V}					
Phoebe Spengler			Mckenna Grace	Mckenna Grace	TBA						
Trevor Spengler			Finn Wolfhard	Finn Wolfhard	TBA						
Podcast			Logan Kim	Logan Kim	TBA					Appeared	
Lucky Domingo			Celeste O'Connor	Celeste O'Connor	TBA					Appeared	
Callie Spengler			Carrie Coon	Carrie Coon	TBA						
Gary Grooberson			Paul Rudd	Paul Rudd	TBA						
=== Supporting cast ===
Mayor Lenny Clotch	David Margulies	David Margulies				Aron Kincaid^{V} Frank Welker^{V} Robert Towers^{V} Hal Smith^{V}					
Mayor Walter Peck	William Atherton			William Atherton	TBA	Neil Ross^{V}		William Atherton^{V}			
Roger Delacorte	John Rothman			John Rothman^{C}							
Nadeem Razmaadi				Kumail Nanjiani							
Dr. Lars Pinfield				James Acaster	TBA					Appeared	
Dr. Hubert Wartzki				Patton Oswalt							
=== Ghosts ===
Slimer	Ivan Reitman^{V}	Ivan Reitman^{V}		Appeared	TBA	Frank Welker^{V}	Billy West^{V}	Ivan Reitman^{V}	Appeared	Appeared	Adam Ray^{V}
Stay Puft Marshmallow Man The Destructor	Bill Bryan		Sarah Natochenny^{V}^{U} Shelby Young^{V}^{U}	Shelby Young^{V}^{U} Ryan Bartley^{V}^{U}	TBA	Frank Welker^{V} John Stocker^{V}		Appeared		Appeared	Parade balloon
Zuul The Gatekeeper	Sigourney Weaver Ivan Reitman^{V}		Carrie Coon Celeste O'Connor Ivan Reitman^{V}								
Vinz Clortho The Keymaster	Rick Moranis		Paul Rudd								
Gozer the Gozerian	Slavitza Jovan Paddi Edwards^{V}		Olivia Wilde^{U} Emma Portner^{M} Shohreh Aghdashloo^{V}								
Eleanor Twitty	Ruth Oliver			Appeared				Appeared			
Mooglie Ghostbusters Logo	Appeared	Appeared	Appeared	Appeared	TBA	Jesse D. Goins^{V}^{U} (Note: In the episode "The Copycat", Goins provides the voice of Copycat, a shape-shifting ghost who briefly takes the form of Mooglie.) Dave Coulier^{V}^{U} (Note: Copycat, while taking the form of Mooglie, is briefly voiced by Dave Coulier in which the former does an impression of Peter Venkman.)	Appeared	Appeared	Appeared	Appeared	Neil Casey (Note: Neil Casey portrays Rowan North, an occultist and supernatural enthusiast who takes the form of Mooglie as a ghost.)
Vigo the Carpathian		Wilhelm von Homburg Max von Sydow^{U}^{V} Howie Weed Dan Aykroyd				Painting		Max von Sydow^{V}		Painting	
Ivo Shandor			J. K. Simmons^{C}					Brian Doyle-Murray^{V}			
Muncher			Josh Gad^{V}						Appeared		
Bug-Eye Ghost			Appeared			Frank Welker^{V}			Appeared		
Garraka				Gil Kenan^{V}					Appeared	Appeared	
Melody				Emily Alyn Lind							
Samhain						Bill Martin	Appeared		Ryan Colt Levy		

== Production ==
=== Development ===
==== Original films (1984–1989) ====
The concept of the first film was inspired by Dan Aykroyd's own fascination with the paranormal (and a history of parapsychology in his own family), and it was conceived by Aykroyd as a vehicle for himself and friend and fellow Saturday Night Live alum John Belushi.

The original story as written by Aykroyd was much more ambitious, and unfocused, than what would be eventually filmed; in Aykroyd's original vision, a group of Ghostbusters would travel through time, space and other dimensions taking on huge ghosts (of which the Stay-Puft Marshmallow Man was just one of many). Also, the Ghostbusters wore SWAT-like outfits and used Proton Packs to fight the ghosts; Ghostbusters storyboards show them wearing riot squad–type helmets with movable transparent visors. The original draft of the script written by Aykroyd was very large, compared to a "phone book" by director Ivan Reitman.

Aykroyd pitched his story to director and producer Ivan Reitman, who liked the basic idea but immediately saw the budgetary impossibilities demanded by Aykroyd's first draft. At Reitman's suggestion, the story was given a major overhaul, eventually evolving into the final screenplay which Aykroyd and Harold Ramis finalised during a few months in a Martha's Vineyard bomb shelter, according to Ramis on the DVD commentary track for the movie. When Belushi died from a drug overdose, Aykroyd and Reitman eventually turned to Bill Murray to replace Belushi's role. Belushi's likeness was later used as the starting design for Slimer.

Ghostbusters was a box office hit, prompting Columbia Pictures to produce an animated series based on the film, The Real Ghostbusters (renamed to avoid a conflict with Filmation's existing cartoon, Ghostbusters), as well as to seek out a sequel. Aykroyd and Ramis had not been conformable with a sequel, believing the first film was meant to be self-contained, but eventually agreed.

==== Struggles with a third film (1990–2014) ====
A second sequel to Ghostbusters had been of interest to Aykroyd and Ramis over the course of the 1990s. During this period Aykroyd wrote a script for a potential third film in the series, titled Ghostbusters III: Hellbent. The concept had the characters transported to an alternate version of Manhattan called Manhellton, where the people and places are "hellish" versions of their originals and where the Ghostbusters meet the devil (a modified version of this script was later used in Ghostbusters: The Video Game). At the time, Aykroyd and Ramis stated that while there was interest from Columbia Pictures, they were reluctant to move forward, as Murray had become less interested in the project, Reitman had stepped aside to let them (Aykroyd and Ramis) lead the discussions, and by this time Ramis was more interested in directing films than acting in them. To deal with potential actor changes, the script was designed around introducing a new, younger cast serving as the starring roles, while the original cast members would return in supporting roles, with the exception of Peter (Murray) having died off screen. This was framed to have the new Ghostbusters help Ray, Egon, and Winston with their struggling business after Peter had left to be with Dana; ultimately, Aykroyd had rewritten a version of the script that he said that Murray and Reitman would take part in, but by 2002, according to Aykroyd, Columbia had expressed concern over the film's high production costs, and felt that it had become too risky of a proposition. Ramis also expressed that Murray had become "kind of obstructionist" about the film, further souring the film to Columbia.

The fate of the script remained unknown until 2006, when Ramis affirmed that a variation of Aykroyd's Hellbent script was still being considered for the sequel; to reduce the need for special effects and reduce production costs, Ramis had conceived a framing device of having the alternate version of Manhattan exist between moments in time, and featured situations of constant gridlock and where everyone spoke a different language in an otherwise unmodified version of the city. Ramis felt this approach would also reflect the "mundane" qualities of the first two films. Murray was still opposed to the film, according to both Ramis and Hudson as well as Aykroyd. In 2009, Ramis shot down rumors that Chris Farley, Ben Stiller or Chris Rock had been under consideration to appear in the film.

Lack of interest and motivation continued to hinder progress until 2008. In September, Columbia hired screenwriters Gene Stupnitsky and Lee Eisenberg to write a new screenplay for a Ghostbusters film, still set to revolve around a new cast of Ghostbusters, with uncertain involvement from the original cast. Aykroyd and Ramis stated filming for this script was expected to start in late 2009 or mid-2010, with a target release window of late 2011 to 2012, and Reitman had committed to directing the film. The question remained about Murray's participation on the film. Murray said in a 2010 talk show appearance that "I'd do it only if my character was killed off in the first reel". Aykroyd had said that Murray had read the Stupnitsky-Eisenberg script, which Aykroyd claimed gave Murray the "comic role of a lifetime", but Murray remained adamant about not participating in it. Production on the film continued, working around Murray's lack of participation, and was considering the possibility of recasting Murray's character.

This version of the sequel stalled again, and by July 2012, a new writing team was engaged to revamp the screenplay. Aykroyd said that "[the screenplay has] got to be perfect. That's the whole thing. There's no point in doing it unless it's perfect". Etan Cohen was hired as lead scriptwriter for this version. The new script still centered on a wholly new cast, this time as students from Columbia University that become the new Ghostbusters due to discoveries from their research, with the original Ghostbusters actors, excluding Murray, reprising their roles in the supporting cast. Aykroyd stated that they left enough variability in the script that should Murray want to participate, they could account for him.

Eventually, the revised script had been completed with plans to start production in 2015. However, Harold Ramis died on February 24, 2014. Initially, Sony/Columbia said that Ramis's role in the film had been minimal and would not affect production, but Reitman felt that the screenplay had to be reworked to better account for this, and approached the studio with his concerns. Following his meetings with Sony, Reitman instead decided to drop out as director of the film, a combination of the impact of Ramis' death on his outlook, the struggles to get a third Ghostbusters film made, and a desire to work on smaller projects such as the recently completed Draft Day. Reitman committed to Sony to remain on in production and helped Sony look for a new director for the film. Over mid-2014, Sony pursued a short list of potential directors for the film. Directors Phil Lord and Christopher Miller were in talks to direct the film, but passed on the project. Ruben Fleischer had also been considered.

==== Alternate dimensions and spin-off developments (2014–2018) ====
By late 2014, Paul Feig had been attached as the potential director for the third film, but Sony officially announced in August that Feig had been brought aboard to helm a reboot of Ghostbusters featuring an all-female cast. Feig had been approached by Reitman and Sony's Amy Pascal to direct the sequel, but Feig turned this down, feeling the concept of the former Ghostbusters passing their roles to a new set of Ghostbusters would not allow him to give the new cast their proper time in the spotlight. These talks resulted in the concept of the reboot as the best way to progress the franchise; this also allowed Feig to avoid issues with the canon from the previous films. Feig partnered with Katie Dippold for the screenplay. Production started in mid-2015, and the film was released in July 2016 under the name Ghostbusters; it was later rebranded in home media as Ghostbusters: Answer the Call to distinguish it from the first film in the franchise.

During production of the 2016 Ghostbusters, Reitman stated that Sony Pictures had been coming off a series of flops, and were looking into a property comparable to the Marvel Cinematic Universe from which they could pull sequels, side stories, and other options for several years to follow. Reitman approached Sony with the idea of "Ghost Corps", a series of films based on the Ghostbusters franchise. Sony founded Ghost Corps in 2015, with Reitman and Aykroyd overseeing its productions. Ghostbusters became the first film branded with the Ghost Corps name.

During the production of Ghostbusters (2016), two additional Ghostbusters related projects emerged, tied to the Ghost Corps studio. In March 2015, Deadline wrote that an all-male lead Ghostbusters film was being developed by Sony's Ghost Corps label, with Channing Tatum and Chris Pratt starring. Anthony and Joe Russo signed on as co-directors, from a script by Drew Pearce, while Reid Carolin and Peter Kiernan would produce the project. In 2016, the project was reportedly cancelled, with the Russo brothers no longer attached. Ivan Reitman later stated that he was not involved with the project, but it never got past early-development stages, with 30-some pages of script written.

The second Ghostbusters-related project reported during this time was an animated film, produced by Reitman and distributed by Sony Pictures Animation. Fletcher Moules was hired to oversee the project as both an animator and the director. The film will be told from the perspective of ghosts.

Following the release of Ghostbusters in 2016, Sony Pictures announced that a sequel to the film was in development. In November, Feig expressed his doubts that the sequel would be made, due to the film performing under expectation at the box office. In response to Feig's comments, Reitman asserted that "there's going to be many other Ghostbusters movies, they're just in development right now".

==== Return to the original timeline (2018–ongoing) ====
In an interview in November 2018, Aykroyd spoke of a new script being developed for a Ghostbusters film that would potentially bring together himself, Murray, and Hudson back in their previous roles, even considering Murray's previous reluctance to return.

A new Ghostbusters film connected to the original two films was confirmed to be in development the following year, with it originally being scheduled for July 10, 2020. Ivan Reitman's son Jason Reitman directed the film, with a script co-written by Jason Reitman and Gil Kenan. Ivan Reitman served as a producer, while The Montecito Picture Company worked on production. Ivan described the film as "passing the torch".

Jason Reitman used the title "Rust City" during the development and pre-production stages to keep the project a secret.

After the release of Ghostbusters: Afterlife in 2021, Aykroyd expressed interest in having the surviving cast of the original Ghostbusters team reprise their roles in up to three sequels. In April 2022, it was announced that a sequel to Afterlife was in early development. This was confirmed by Jason Reitman under the working title Firehouse two months later.

=== Additional crew and production details ===
Title	Crew/Detail						
Title	Composer(s)	Title song	Cinematographer	Editors	Production companies	Distributing companies	Running time
Film productions
Ghostbusters	Elmer Bernstein	Ghostbusters by Ray Parker Jr.	László Kovács	Sheldon Kahn; David E. Blewitt	Columbia Pictures; Delphi Productions; Black Rhino Productions; Bernie Brillstein Productions	Columbia Pictures	105 minutes
Ghostbusters II	Randy Edelman	Ghostbusters by Ray Parker Jr.	Michael Chapman	Donn Cambern; Sheldon Kahn	Columbia Pictures	Columbia Pictures	108 minutes
Ghostbusters	Theodore Shapiro	Ghostbusters (I'm Not Afraid) by Fall Out Boy; Missy Elliott	Robert Yeoman	Brent White; Melissa Bretherton	Ghost Corps; LStar Capital; Pascal Pictures; Columbia Pictures; Feigco Entertainment; Village Roadshow Pictures; The Montecito Picture Company	Sony Pictures Releasing	116 minutes
Ghostbusters: Afterlife	Rob Simonsen	—N/a	Eric Steelberg	Nathan Orloff; Dana E. Glauberman	Ghost Corps; Bron Creative; Columbia Pictures; Right of Way Films; The Montecito Picture Company	Sony Pictures Releasing	125 minutes
Ghostbusters: Frozen Empire	Dario Marianelli	—N/a	Eric Steelberg	Nathan Orloff; Shane Reid	Ghost Corps; Bron Creative; Columbia Pictures; Right of Way Films	Sony Pictures Releasing	115 minutes
Television productions
The Real Ghostbusters	Haim Saban; Shuki Levy; Steve Rucker; Thomas Chase Jones	Ghostbusters by Ray Parker Jr.	—N/a	Allan Gelbart; Gregory K. Bowron; Richard Bruce Elliott	DIC Entertainment (Note: Animation outsourced to Wang Film Productions, TMS Entertainment, Toei Animation, Trans Arts, Dong Yang Animation, Saerom Animation, Plus One Animation, Sei Young Animation, Daiwon, Visual 80, Hanho Heung-Up and KK C&D Asia.); Columbia Pictures Television	Coca-Cola Telecommunications; Columbia Pictures Television Distribution	2,800 minutes (20 minutes/episode)
Extreme Ghostbusters	Jim Latham	Ghostbusters by Jim Cummings	—N/a	Mark Scheib; Kyle Solorio; Eric C. Daroca; Paul D. Calder; Eytan Sternberg; Bruce W. Cathcart	Adelaide Productions; Columbia TriStar Television	Bohbot Entertainment; Columbia TriStar Domestic Television	800 minutes (20 minutes/episode)
Ghostbusters: Night Shift	—N/a	—N/a	—N/a	—N/a	Sony Pictures Animation; Netflix Animation Studios; Ghost Corps	Netflix	—N/a

== Reception ==
=== Box office performance ===
Film	Box office gross			Box office ranking		Budget	Ref.
Film	North America	Other territories	Worldwide	US and Canada	Worldwide	Budget	Ref.
Ghostbusters	$243,640,120	$53,000,000	$296,640,120	#154 (#26^{(A)})	N/A	$30 million	
Ghostbusters II	$112,494,738	$102,900,000	$215,394,738	#677 (#326^{(A)})	#840	$37 million	
Ghostbusters	$128,350,574	$100,796,935	$229,147,509	#541 (#936^{(A)})	#779	$144 million	
Ghostbusters: Afterlife	$129,467,867	$74,973,880	$204,445,747	#536 (#1,160^{(A)})	#911	$75 million	
Ghostbusters: Frozen Empire	$113,376,590	$88,590,931	$201,967,521	#669 (#1,487^{(A)})	#929	$100 million	
Totals	$727,329,889	$420,261,746	$1,147,595,635	—N/a	—N/a	$386 million	
List indicator^{(A)} indicates the adjusted totals based on current ticket prices (calculated by Box Office Mojo).

With the release of Ghostbusters: Afterlife, the Ghostbusters franchise hit $1 billion worldwide.

=== Critical and public response ===
Film	Critical		Public
Film	Rotten Tomatoes	Metacritic	CinemaScore
Ghostbusters	95% (83 reviews)	71 (8 reviews)	—N/a
Ghostbusters II	57% (46 reviews)	56 (14 reviews)	A–
Ghostbusters	74% (392 reviews)	60 (52 reviews)	B+
Ghostbusters: Afterlife	63% (309 reviews)	45 (47 reviews)	A–
Ghostbusters: Frozen Empire	41% (304 reviews)	46 (50 reviews)	B+

=== Cultural impact ===
According to the director commentary on the Ghostbusters DVD, the movie's cultural impact was felt almost immediately. The building that was Dana Barrett's apartment building in Ghostbusters has, since the release of the film, been known as the Ghostbusters Building, and along with the Hook and Ladder Firehouse, has become a real-world New York City tourist attraction. In May 2010, the group Improv Everywhere, at the invitation of the New York Public Library, staged a Ghostbusters-themed "mission" in the same reading room used in the film. The video game Burnout Paradise pays homage to the franchise with a car titled the 'Manhattan Spirit', which is based on the Ecto-1.

The movie Be Kind Rewind includes a sequence in which Jack Black, Mos Def, and others recreate the first movie using props and costumes made by themselves, a guest appearance by Sigourney Weaver, and a version of the theme sung by Jack Black.

On June 9, 2013, a trailer for a documentary called Spook Central, featuring clips from Ghostbusters alongside discussions of the perceived meanings in the film, mimicking the style of the documentary Room 237, was uploaded to YouTube.

The movie's catchphrase, "Who you gonna call?", has been used in other media, like the 1990s Casper cartoon series. In the 1995 film version of Casper, Dan Aykroyd appears in character as Ray Stantz having been hired to remove the Whipstaff Manor of ghosts but having been foiled by the Ghostly Trio, Stantz sheepishly tells the new owners, "Who ya gonna call? Someone else."

In 2016, independent filmmakers produced a video titled Ghostheads, which showcases and profiles various "Ghostheads" (self-named fans of the franchise ala "Trekkers" for Star Trek), and different individual franchises throughout the United States and Canada.

In 2018, the Carabinieri of Pavia named the plan to arrest an art thief who used a ghostly bed sheet to be unrecognizable "Operazione Ghostbusters" ("Operation Ghostbusters").

In 2021, The Buffalo Ghostbusters asked fans from all around the world to raise money for a new full-size replica Ghostbusters sign, which it later donated to Hook & Ladder 8 in New York City, commonly known as "The Ghostbusters Firehouse". The sign now prominently hangs outside year-round, above the main entrance, and is visited often by fans. This has led to an annual fundraiser, with a celebration at the firehouse planned each year in early June to coincide with "Ghostbusters Day".

Grand Theft Auto Online features references to Ghostbusters during the 2023 and 2024 Halloween updates. A car that looks like Ecto-1 can receive a "Ghosts Exposed" livery. A jumpsuit is available to all players who capture 10 ghosts on film, the jumpsuit looking like the iconic Ghostbusters suit with "Ghosts Exposed" decals.

== Music ==
Soundtrack title	Release date	Composer	Label
Ghostbusters: Original Soundtrack Album	June 8, 1984	—N/a	Arista
Ghostbusters II	June 12, 1989	—N/a	MCA
Ghostbusters: Original Motion Picture Score	March 16, 2006	Elmer Bernstein	Intrada & Sony Classical
Ghostbusters: Original Motion Picture Score (2016)	July 8, 2016	Theodore Shapiro	Sony Classical
Ghostbusters: Original Motion Picture Soundtrack (2016)	July 15, 2016	—N/a	RCA
Ghostbusters II: Original Motion Picture Score	August 13, 2021	Randy Edelman	Sony Classical
Ghostbusters: Afterlife (Original Motion Picture Soundtrack)	November 19, 2021	Rob Simonsen	Sony Classical
Ghostbusters: Frozen Empire (Original Motion Picture Soundtrack)	March 22, 2024	Dario Marianelli	Sony Classical

The first film sparked the catchphrases, "Who ya gonna call? Ghostbusters!" and "I ain't afraid of no ghost". Both came from the theme song performed by Ray Parker Jr., who wrote it in a day and a half. The song was a huge hit, staying at No. 1 for three weeks on Billboard's Hot 100 chart and No. 1 for two weeks on the Black Singles chart. The song earned Parker an Academy Award nomination for "Best Original Song".

The music video produced for the song is considered one of the key productions in the early music video era, and was a No. 1 MTV video. Directed by Reitman, and produced by Jeffrey Abelson, the video organically integrated footage of the film in a specially designed haunted house, lined with neon in its entirety. The film footage was intercut with a humorous performance by Parker and featured cameo appearances by celebrities who joined in the call and response chorus, including Chevy Chase, Irene Cara, John Candy, Nickolas Ashford, Melissa Gilbert, Jeffrey Tambor, George Wendt, Al Franken, Danny DeVito, Carly Simon, Peter Falk, and Teri Garr. The video ends with footage of the four main Ghostbusters actors, in costume and character, dancing in Times Square behind Parker, joining in the singing.

The sequel spawned two singles from its soundtrack. R&B artist Bobby Brown had a successful hit with "On Our Own", while hip hop group Run-D.M.C. were commissioned to perform "Ghostbusters (rap version)" for the sequel.

== Other media and merchandise ==
The theme park special effects show Ghostbusters Spooktacular ran at Universal Studios Florida from 1990 to 1996. The Ghostbusters were later featured in a lip-synching dance show including Beetlejuice on the steps of the New York Public Library façade at the park. The characters were all-new and "extreme" versions in the show, save for the Zeddemore character. Their Ecto-1 automobile was used to drive them around the park, and was often used in the park's annual "Macy's Holiday Parade". For the show, an experimental silicone skin was used on Slimer, which took two weeks to put together. The show, Ecto-1, and all other Ghostbuster trademarks were discontinued in 2005 when Universal did not renew the rights for theme park use, with the Firehouse façade being integrated with the park's Rip Ride Rockit rollercoaster after all decals and the Ghostbuster sign were removed. Ghostbusters returned to the park in 2019, part of a haunted house for the annual Halloween Horror Nights, in both the Orlando and Hollywood parks. Ghostbusters returned again to the park in 2024 for Universal Mega Movie Parade.

The National Entertainment Collectibles Association (NECA) released a line of 7" scale action figures based on the first movie, but only produced a series of ghost characters, as Murray refused the rights to use his facial likeness. Their first and only series included Gozer, Slimer (or Onionhead), the Terror Dogs: Zuul and Vinz Clortho, and a massive Stay-Puft Marshmallow Man, contrasting the diminutive figure that was in the original figure line.

Ertl released a die-cast 1/25 scale Ectomobile, also known as the Ecto-1, the Ghostbusters' main transportation. Smiffys Costumes has produced a Ghostbusters Halloween costume, consisting of a one-piece jumpsuit with logos and an inflatable Proton Pack.

By 2007, Ghostbusters merchandise sales had exceeded $1 billion in revenue.

Art Asylum's Minimates toy line features a Ghostbusters sub-line, including a box set of characters from the 2009 video game. Extreme Ghostbusters has also seen a line of children's toys released by Trendmasters. Toys R Us released the Villains Series 3 of the Ghostbusters Minimates in January 2010.

The Parallax Corporation produces a line of marshmallows in a collectible box licensed under the Stay Puft Marshmallows brand.

Mattel has produced a series of action figures based on characters from both the 1984 & 1989 movies and the 2009 video game, most of which were sold exclusively on their MattyCollector.Com webstore. This 6" line featured Peter, Ray, Egon, Winston, Gatekeeper Dana, Keymaster Louis, Walter Peck, Vigo the Carpathian, and most of the ghosts including a giant Mr Stay Puft. Mattel also offered a series of 12" figures with fabric clothing and light-up proton packs/slime blowers, as well as a number of replica toy props such as the PKE Meter & Ghost Trap. For retail stores, there was a "retro" series of 8-inch, cloth-costumed action figures based on the animated series, and a festive 6" Ghostbusters II set featuring the team in their dark grey uniforms with Santa hats.

At the February 2015 Toyfair Diamond Select Toys revealed several figures in a new 7" action figure line based on the first movie. These include Ray, Winston, Peter, Egon, Gozer, the Terror Dogs (Zuul & Vinz Clortho), Dana, and Louis. Each figure also includes pieces to assemble a diorama of the rooftop temple.

In 2017, Playmobil also produced a toy line featuring the Ghostbusters and essential elements from the first movie, including Dana Barret, the Marshmallow Man and Ecto-1.

The Ghostbusters' firehouse, in reality the still-used Hook & Ladder Company 8 fire station in New York, has become an icon of the franchise. It has become the basis for, among other products, Lego and Playmobil toy sets.

=== Video games ===
Year	Title	System	Developer	Publisher
1984	Ghostbusters	Commodore 64, MSX	Activision	Activision
1984	Ghostbusters	ZX Spectrum	James Software Ltd.	Activision
1985	Ghostbusters	Apple II, Atari 8-bit, IBM PCjr/Tandy 1000, Atari 2600	Activision	Activision
1985	Ghostbusters	Amstrad CPC	James Software Ltd.	Activision
1986	Ghostbusters	NES/Famicom	Bits Laboratory	Activision, Tokuma Shoten (Japan only)
1987	Ghostbusters	Master System	Compile	Sega
1987	The Real Ghostbusters	Arcade	Data East	
1988	The Real Ghostbusters	Amiga, Atari ST	Activision	Activision
1988	The Real Ghostbusters	Amstrad CPC	Software Studios	Activision
1989	The Real Ghostbusters	Commodore 64, ZX Spectrum	Mr. Micro Ltd.	Activision
1989	Ghostbusters II	MS-DOS	Dynamix	Activision
1989	Ghostbusters II	Commodore 64, Amiga, Atari ST, Amstrad CPC, ZX Spectrum, MSX	Foursfield	Activision
1990	Ghostbusters II	NES	Imagineering	Activision
1990	Ghostbusters	Genesis/Mega Drive	Sega, Compile	Sega
1990	New Ghostbusters II	Game Boy, NES/Famicom	Hal Laboratory	Hal Laboratory, Activision (GB version, NA & EU only)
1992	Ghostbusters II	Atari 2600	Avantgarde Software	Activision, Salu Ltd.
1993	The Real Ghostbusters	Game Boy	Kemco	Activision
2009	Ghostbusters: The Video Game	Xbox 360, PlayStation 3, Microsoft Windows	Terminal Reality	Atari, Sony Computer Entertainment (PS3 version, Europe only)
2009	Ghostbusters: The Video Game	Wii, PlayStation 2, PlayStation Portable	Red Fly Studios	Atari, Sony Computer Entertainment (PS2 version, Europe only)
2009	Ghostbusters: The Video Game	Nintendo DS	Zen Studios	Atari
2011	Ghostbusters: Sanctum of Slime	Xbox 360, PlayStation 3, Steam	Behaviour Santiago	Atari
2012	Ghostbusters: Paranormal Blast	iOS, Android	XMG Studio	
2013	Beeline's Ghostbusters	iOS	Beeline Interactive	Capcom
2014	Ghostbusters Pinball	iOS, Android	FarSight Studios	
2016	Ghostbusters	PlayStation 4, Xbox One, Steam	FireForge Games	Activision
2016	Ghostbusters: Slime City	iOS, Android	EightPixelsSquare	Activision
2018	Ghostbusters World	iOS, Android	NextAge	Columbia Pictures, Ghost Corps, FourThirtyThree
2019	Ghostbusters: The Video Game Remastered	PlayStation 4, Xbox One, Nintendo Switch, Epic Games Store, Steam	Saber Interactive	Mad Dog Games
2022	Ghostbusters: Spirits Unleashed	Microsoft Windows, PlayStation 4, PlayStation 5, Xbox One, Xbox Series X/S	IllFonic	
2023	Ghostbusters: Rise of the Ghost Lord	Meta Quest 2, Meta Quest 3, Meta Quest Pro, PlayStation VR2	nDreams	Sony Pictures Virtual Reality

In PlayStation Home, the PlayStation 3's online community-based social gaming network, Loot Interactive, in association with Atari and Terminal Reality, released a Ghostbusters-themed apartment space on June 18, 2009. Called the "Ghostbusters Firehouse: On Location", this space is dedicated to the 25th anniversary of Ghostbusters and its worldwide release on Blu-ray. The Firehouse personal space is a detailed replica of the three floor Ghostbusters headquarters from the original film, including the ghost containment unit in the basement, the garage and office areas on the 1st floor, plus the living room, laboratory, fire poles, bedroom and bathroom areas.

Family Guy: The Quest for Stuff's 2014 Halloween event features a Ghostbusters theme to commemorate the film's 30th anniversary. The story involves Peter, Cleveland, Joe, and Quagmire becoming Ghostbusters to fight a paranormal invasion in Quahog. Included in the event are Ghostbuster uniforms for Peter and company, the Ghostbuster firehouse, and Ecto-1. The 2015 toys-to-life game Lego Dimensions features multiple characters, locations and stages based on the Ghostbusters franchise, including the original films and Paul Feig's Ghostbusters. On June 4, the theme park simulation game Planet Coaster added a Ghostbusters-themed pack.

=== Slot machine ===
The Ghostbusters slot machine was one of the most anticipated games released by International Game Technology in 2012. It is popular in the casinos of Las Vegas and there is also an online version of the game. It features 5 reels and 30 paylines with 3 interactive bonus rounds that can be unlocked. Dan Ackroyd also provided custom speech as Ray Stantz.

=== Pinball ===
Stern Pinball released a Ghostbusters pinball game in June 2016. The game is available in three models: Pro, Premium, and Limited Edition. The game includes audio clips from the first two movies, as well as custom voice work from Ernie Hudson.

=== Comic books ===
Ray Stantz of the Ghostbusters battles a rampaging Stay Puft Marshmallow Man in this Graham Crackers variant cover to Ghostbusters: Legion #1. Published by 88MPH.

In the late 1980s, NOW Comics and Marvel UK published The Real Ghostbusters, comics based on the TV series of the same name.

In May 2003, Sony signed an agreement with 88MPH Studios to work on a comic update of the Ghostbusters film, to be released later in the year. Ghostbusters: Legion saw the return of the four Ghostbusters and the principal cast from the film. Legion updated the series by setting the events of the first film in 2004, rather than 1984. Set six months after the Gozer incident, the series was designed to follow the Ghostbusters as their initial fame faded and they returned to the regular chore of busting ghosts on a daily basis. The series sees the team run ragged as a spate of supernatural crimes and other related occurrences plague the city, as well as contemplating the greater effects of their success beyond the immediate media attention.

Manga publisher Tokyopop produced an original English-language manga around the same time the video game was announced. It was released in October 2008, under the title Ghostbusters: Ghost Busted. Taking place between the second film and the game, the manga featured a series of one-shot stories from several different artists and writers, as well as a subplot involving Jack Hardemeyer (from the second movie) and a vengeful army of ghosts attempting to get revenge on the Ghostbusters.

IDW Publishing also released a comic book series based on the franchise. Their first series, Ghostbusters: The Other Side, was written by Keith Champagne, with art by Tom Nguyen. A second series was later released in 2009 as Ghostbusters: Displaced Aggression. A third series, Ghostbusters: Haunted Holidays was released in November 2010. From September 2011 through December 2012, IDW published an ongoing series that ran 16 issues, written by Erik Burnham with art by Dan Schoening and Luis Antonio Delgado. From February 2013 through September 2014, a new ongoing series titled The New Ghostbusters, also by Burnham, Schoening, and Delgado, ran 20 issues.

In 2019, IDW published a 5 issue collection that saw The Ghostbusters & The Transformers crossover entitled Transformers Ghostbusters - Ghosts of Cybertron, where The Ghostbusters team up with The Autobots to fight ghosts of The Decepticons.

For the occasion of the mutual 30-year anniversary of both franchises, IDW published a limited crossover series titled Teenage Mutant Ninja Turtles/Ghostbusters in 2014, featuring the IDW version of the Teenage Mutant Ninja Turtles joining forces with the comics Ghostbusters. The success of the series launched a sequel—Teenage Mutant Ninja Turtles/Ghostbusters 2—three years later, with an accompanying assortment of action figures blending the Turtles' and the Ghostbusters' physical features.

Ghostbusters: Back in Town, a limited comic book series, was published in 2024 by Dark Horse Comics. The series is set between Ghostbusters: Afterlife and Ghostbusters: Frozen Empire. Ghostbusters: Dead Man's Chest, set between Ghostbusters: Back in Town and Ghostbusters: Frozen Empire, began releasing in 2025.

=== Books ===
- Ghostbusters: The Return is a 2004 novel written by Sholly Fisch in celebration of the franchise's 20th anniversary. Set two years after Ghostbusters II, the novel revolves around Venkman running for mayor of New York City and an ancient entity trying to conquer the world by bringing urban legends to life.
- Tobin's Spirit Guide: Official Ghostbusters Edition is a 2016 fiction reference book written by Erik Burnham to tie in with the release of the Ghostbusters reboot. The book is mentioned in the first film and later seen in a digital databank version in the sequel.
- Ghosts from Our Past: Both Literally and Figuratively: The Study of the Paranormal is a 2016 fiction reference book written by Andrew Shaffer under the pen names of "Erin Gilbert" and "Abby L. Yates". The book appears in the reboot film, being the manual written by the two protagonists, which also ends up being the cause of their reunion.
