= Ghostbusters 2016 =

Ghostbusters 2016 can refer to

- Ghostbusters (2016 film)
- Ghostbusters (2016 video game)
