= The Real Ghostbusters (1987 video game) =

1987 video game

- Cover art (ZX Spectrum)
- Developer: Data East
- Publishers: Data East (arcade); Activision (ports)
- Series: Ghostbusters
- Platforms: Arcade; Amiga; Amstrad CPC; Atari ST; Commodore 64; ZX Spectrum
- Release: Arcade: NA: 1987; EU: 1987; JP: 1987; Computer versions: EU: 1989
- Genre: Shoot 'em up
- Modes: Single-player, multiplayer

The Real Ghostbusters is a 1987 shoot 'em up arcade game developed and published by Data East. It is loosely based on Ghostbusters. In Japan, Data East released it as a non-Ghostbusters arcade game under the title Meikyuu Hunter G. (Note: Japanese: 迷宮ハンターG, Hepburn: Meikyū Hantā Jī; lit. "Labyrinth Hunter G") In 1989, Activision published The Real Ghostbusters for Amiga, Amstrad CPC, Atari ST, Commodore 64, and ZX Spectrum.

== Gameplay ==
The Real Ghostbusters is a shoot 'em up game loosely based on the Ghostbusters franchise. It features 10 levels, each viewed from an angled overhead perspective. The player controls a member of the Ghostbusters team who must defend against various monsters and ghosts while completing each level on a time limit. Monsters are killed if the player shoots at them, and the player can earn bonus points by trapping each monster's soul, which is done by using a proton beam to suck in the ghost.

Bonus items that can aid the player are hidden throughout the game in objects such as oil drums and wheelbarrows. Bonus items include weapon upgrades, or a Slimer ghost who protects the player by killing enemies who get too close. The end of each level features a boss enemy ghost who must be defeated, leaving behind a key that allows the player to access the next level. The arcade version includes a multiplayer option for up to three players, while the computer versions feature only a two-player option for multiplayer mode.

Meikyuu Hunter G features eight levels, similar to The Real Ghostbusters but with different layouts. It features less weaponry than The Real Ghostbusters and the multiplayer mode supports only two players instead of three.

== Development and release ==
Akira Sakuma, a former programmer at Data East, stated in 2023 on his Twitter account that The Real Ghostbusters was developed from the start as a Ghostbusters arcade game intended specifically for the overseas markets. Due to licensing restrictions, it was released in Japan with modifications as a non-Ghostbusters arcade game. The letter "G" at the end of the Japanese title Meikyuu Hunter G was chosen directly in reference to Ghostbusters. Although The Real Ghostbusters is the original version of the game, Meikyuu Hunter G came out first albeit in the same year. Most of the enemies were redrawn for Meikyuu Hunter G, which also removed Ray Parker Jr.'s song "Ghostbusters" from the game.

In 1989, Activision published conversions of The Real Ghostbusters for various computer platforms in Europe, including Amiga, Amstrad CPC, Atari ST, Commodore 64 (C64), and ZX Spectrum. In the United Kingdom in 1991, The Hit Squad published The Real Ghostbusters as a budget re-release for CPC and C64.

== Reception ==
Reception

Review scores
Publication	Score
ACE	574/1000 (ZX Spectrum); 586/1000 (Atari ST)
Crash	90% (ZX Spectrum)
Computer and Video Games	58% (C64); 60% (Amiga); 56% (ZX Spectrum); 61% (Atari ST); 59% (CPC re-release)
Sinclair User	65/100 (ZX Spectrum)
Your Sinclair	62/100 (ZX Spectrum)
Zzap!64	67% (C64); 26% (Amiga); 60% (C64 re-release)
Amiga Computing	24% (Amiga)
Commodore Force	57% (C64 release)
Commodore Format	72% (C64 release)
CU Commodore User Amiga-64	32% (C64)
The Games Machine	86% (ZX Spectrum); 78% (C64/128); 74% (CPC); 57% (Amiga); 55% (Atari ST)

Award
Publication	Award
Crash	Crash Smash

Chris Jenkins of ACE called the arcade version "enormous fun" and believed it would become a hit, while John Cook of Computer and Video Games (CVG) considered the arcade version and its computer conversions to be mediocre, and believed that the game would primarily appeal to Ghostbusters fans and "undemanding gamers". Some reviewers criticized the computer versions for their graphics, character sprites, and scrolling. Critics had differing opinions as to whether The Real Ghostbusters was a superior game to Activision's original Ghostbusters game.

Andy Smith of ACE reviewed the Atari ST and ZX Spectrum versions and considered them to be an accurate reproduction of the arcade game, but he criticized the graphics, the collision detection, the gameplay, and the "confusing" perspective. Zzap!64 criticized the graphics and sound of the C64 and Amiga versions, while also criticizing the latter version for poor collision detection. The Games Machine considered the color scheme of the Amstrad CPC version unattractive, and stated that the Atari ST version was as "unimpressive" as the Amiga version. The ST version was criticized for its animation, "crude" music and sound, and jerky movements, with the conclusion that it would only appeal to Real Ghostbusters fans.

Mark Patterson of CU Commodore User Amiga-64 considered the playable character to be "tiny, blocky, and poorly animated", and considered the character movements difficult to perform due to the game's perspective. Reviewers for Crash called the game "addictive and highly enjoyable", praising the graphics, music, and gameplay, although one reviewer criticized the two-player mode for issues involving the controls and scrolling.

Stuart C. Russell of Amiga Computing praised the sound and the two-player option, but was critical of the graphics, scrolling, gameplay, and character sprites. Russell mentioned that the arcade version had very smooth, clear graphics and superior sound. Gordon Hamlett of Your Amiga considered the graphics to be adequate, but criticized the presence of a loading sequence that occurs in order to restart each level whenever the player is killed. Hamlett considered it an average shoot 'em up game stated that the screen does not scroll unless the player is at the edge of it, with the result being that "you are frequently getting shot at, and killed, by creatures that you can't actually see!"

The ZX Spectrum was criticized for attribute clash, while The Games Machine criticized the playable character sprites for being outlined "thickly and unattractively in black", but said that the creatures were well animated. Your Sinclair criticized the graphics, music, difficult controls, and jerky scrolling of the ZX Spectrum version, while Sinclair User criticized the perspective and believed it would only appeal to Ghostbusters fans.

=== Later reception ===
CVG's Richard Leadbetter, reviewing the Amstrad CPC re-release, criticized the game's jerky scrolling, repetitive gameplay, and its color scheme. Commodore Format considered the C64 re-release to be worth a look, praising its sound and abundance of gameplay, while writing that the graphics looked fairly well. Zzap!64 criticized the small character sprites, as well as the bland and repetitive graphics.

In 2014, Robert Workman of Shacknews ranked it among the top three best Ghostbusters games, calling it a classic and a delight, but thought that the main theme song is over-used. In 2016, Luke McKinney of Den of Geek also ranked it among the series' best, writing that it delivered the chunky pixel graphics and action that fans had wanted. He also said that the game would have benefited from controls similar to Smash TV and more music, but concluded that the game was a good way to fire off a few coins and proton streams.

In 2019, Kurt Kalata of HardcoreGaming101.net stated that The Real Ghostbusters was more refined than its Japanese counterpart, and wrote that while the Ghostbusters version was "not exactly exciting", Meikyuu Hunter G was not fun because of the large amount of enemies, whereas Ghostbusters is playable on the virtue of giving the players more powerful weapons. Kalata considered the main "Ghostbusters" theme music to be well rendered, but wrote that it later becomes repetitive. Kalata said that the Amiga and Atari ST versions have choppy animation and some annoying sound effects; Commodore 64 version is smoother, but the hit detection is iffy; the Amstrad CPC version has some bad colors and is quite choppy; and the ZX Spectrum is a little smoother and more playable, and less garish.
