= Ectomobile =

Car from the Ghostbusters franchise

- Ghostbusters vehicle
- One of the Specialised Electronical Vehicular Devices used during the filming of Ghostbusters (1984) stored in the Sony Archive
- First appearance: Ghostbusters; 1984
- Created by: Dan Aykroyd; Harold Ramis

Information
- Affiliation: Ghostbusters

General characteristics
- Type: Automobile
- Power: Gasoline

The Specialised Electronical Vehicular Device (also known as the Ectomobile, Ecto-1) is a custom-built vehicle from the Ghostbusters franchise. It appears in the films Ghostbusters (1984), Ghostbusters II (1989), Ghostbusters (2016), Ghostbusters: Afterlife (2021), Ghostbusters: Frozen Empire (2024), in the animated television series: The Real Ghostbusters and Extreme Ghostbusters, and in the video games Ghostbusters: The Video Game and Ghostbusters: Spirits Unleashed.

== Creation and conception ==
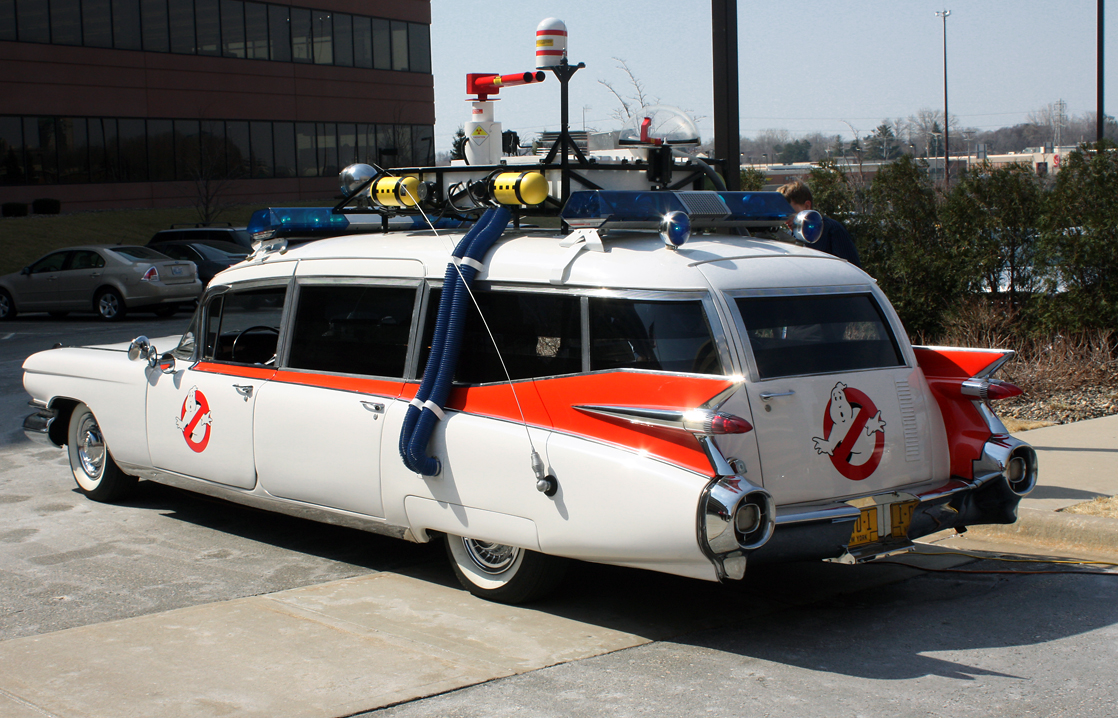
Rear (original)

The Ecto-1 is a 1959 Cadillac Miller-Meteor Sentinel limo-style endloader combination car (ambulance conversion) used in the 1984 film Ghostbusters and other Ghostbusters fiction. The original vehicle design was the creation of Steven Dane, credited as a Hardware Consultant in the credits.

In the original movie, Ray Stantz pays $4,800 (equivalent to $14,875 in 2025) for it and claims it needs a plethora of repairs. In Stantz's own words, "it needs suspension work and shocks, brakes, brake pads, lining, steering box, transmission, rear end ... maybe new rings, also mufflers, a little wiring ..."

After the necessary reconstruction, it is used to carry the Ghostbusters and their ghost-capturing equipment through New York City. Its features include a special pull-out rack utilizing the old ambulance's gurney in the rear containing the staff's proton packs. There are also various gadgets mounted on the top, whose functions are never revealed in the movies. A cartoon episode features the proton cannon, presumably a more powerful version of a proton pack, mounted on top for use against extra-large or even giant-sized paranormal entities.

Earlier versions of scripts written by Aykroyd for the first Ghostbusters also includes mentions of the Ectomobile having the power of interdimensional travel. The shooting script for the movie describes the Ectomobile as being black, with purple and white strobe lights that gave the vehicle a "purple aura".

A miniature replica of the vehicle was mass-produced as a children's toy. AMT / Ertl offered a 1/25 of Ecto 1A in 1989, while Polar Lights released a 1/25 scale plastic model kit of the Ecto-1 in 2002. In 2010, Hot Wheels released a "Ghostbusters Ecto-1" as part of the "2010 Hot Wheels Premiere" series.

Hot Wheels Elite released a highly detailed 1/18 diecast of the Ecto-1 in 2010 and in early 2013, they released a 1/18 Ecto-1A as seen in Ghostbusters II.

The repaired Ectomobile is named on-screen with the license plate shown reading "Ecto-1". The word Ectomobile was only used in the song "Cleaning Up The Town" from the film's soundtrack. The filmmakers planned to have the Ecto-1 painted black, but the color of the vehicle was changed to white when it was decided a black car would be too difficult to see during night scenes. Three cars have played the vehicle in the movies; the third 1959 Miller-Meteor was purchased after the second died during shooting of Ghostbusters II. The black Miller-Meteor seen at the beginning of the first movie was leased and used only for that scene and never converted for filming.

The original Ecto-1 was restored by Sony for the release of Ghostbusters: The Video Game, and currently sits in front of Sony Picture's Ghost Corps building along with the 2016 Ecto-1. The Ecto-1A was originally scheduled to be restored along with the Ecto-1, but a lack in funds meant only Ecto-1 could be restored. The deteriorated car continued to sit at the Universal back lot for years. In 2019, the Ecto-1A was turned into one of two weathered versions of the Ecto-1 for the filming of Ghostbusters: Afterlife. It was later used for filming of Ghostbusters: Frozen Empire, particularly the scenes shot in New York.

The Universal Studios "Spooktacular" stage show featured an Ectomobile replica built by a man from Tennessee. The Universal Studios Ecto-1 Replica was sold at the Barrett-Jackson auto auction in Scottsdale Arizona on January 22, 2010, for $80,000. Another replica was made by Peter Mosen and bought by George Barris. Yet another replica currently resides at Historic Auto Attractions museum in Roscoe, Illinois.

The official designation was found within the contents of the Ghostbusters (comics), specifically Vol. 1) #7 VF on page 19.

== History ==
=== Ghostbusters (1984) ===
The vehicle used for Ecto-1 was a 1959 Cadillac professional chassis, built by the Miller-Meteor company. The ambulance/hearse combination was the end loader variety. Dr. Ray Stantz found the vehicle in 1984, shortly after he mortgaged a house left to him by his parents in order to buy and remodel a dilapidated firehouse for use as the team's headquarters. He purchased the vehicle for $4,800 and performed the extensive repairs needed to bring it up to a condition that would suit their needs. It was painted white with red trim, marked with the company logo on the sides and rear, and fitted with an array of equipment on the roof, and became a well-recognized symbol for the Ghostbusters franchise. The interior was modified to allow easy access to the team's equipment (Proton Packs, ghost traps, etc.) via the rear door.

=== Ghostbusters II ===
After the Ghostbusters were shut down, Stantz and Winston Zeddemore kept Ecto-1 and used it for transport to and from events for which they had been hired to provide entertainment, such as children's birthday parties. It fell into a state of disrepair and was seen spewing smoke, and had other various mechanical problems. Following the Ghostbusters' return to business in 1989, Ecto-1 was overhauled and renamed Ecto-1a, but a running fan theory is that the team acquired a replacement car and outfitted it for service.

==== Before Ghostbusters: Afterlife ====
Ecto-1 underwent a range of upgrades at some point between 1989 and 2021. An extendable gunner seat was added to the right rear passenger area and the corresponding door was modified to fold flat against the vehicle body, allowing a team member to fire a Proton Pack without having to lean out a window. A Remote Trap Vehicle (RTV) was also constructed, consisting of a ghost trap mounted on a radio-controlled car that could be independently steered and activated. The Cadillac was fitted with a compartment to carry the RTV, and a retractable ramp was built into the floor to assist in its deployment. When his colleagues refused to believe his warnings of Gozer's potential return, Egon Spengler stole all of the team's equipment, including Ecto-1, and relocated to a farmhouse in Summerville, Oklahoma.

=== Ghostbusters: Afterlife ===
In June 2021, Spengler's grandson Trevor found Ecto-1 on the grounds of the farm inherited by his mother Callie. The vehicle had deteriorated in storage to the point of being completely non-functional, but Trevor repaired it with help from Spengler's ghost. He, his sister Phoebe, and her friend Podcast used Ecto-1 and the RTV to capture a ghost named Muncher, but the three were arrested for the damage they caused and Ecto-1 was impounded at the Summerville County Sheriff's Department along with the RTV. The next day, amid the chaos caused by the interdimensional cross-rip and with the police preoccupied by the situation, the children recovered Ecto-1 and the RTV from the now-empty police department (freeing Muncher in the process) and drove to the Shandor Mining Company, aided by Trevor's friend Lucky Domingo. After the four captured Gozer's minion Zuul using the RTV, they drove back to the farm in order to lure Gozer into a field of ghost traps placed by Spengler and capture it with the help of the Ghostbusters; however, Gozer caught up to them at the last second and destroyed the RTV, releasing Zuul. During the confrontation with Gozer, Mini-Pufts sneaked onto Ecto-1 and attempted to sabotage the vehicle's equipment, but Podcast eventually repelled them with a taser. Following Gozer's defeat, Zeddemore had Ecto-1 fully restored and delivered to the Ghostbusters' old firehouse.

=== Ghostbusters: Frozen Empire ===
After the Ghostbusters restarted their business, Ecto-1 was given a few upgrades, including the ability to deploy an air drone equipped with a ghost trap from its roof, along with a new RTV. It was first used to capture a ghost called the Sewer Dragon. At one point, it was possessed by a ghost called the Possessor, who tried to run over the Ghostbusters.

== Other versions ==
Throughout other Ghostbusters fiction, a number of other Ectomobiles are introduced.

- In the 1984 computer game adaptation, players are given the choice between the 1959 ambulance (which looked the most like Ecto-1), a cheap VW Beetle, a spacious station wagon and a high performance (but low-capacity) sports car.
- Ecto-1a is an upgraded version of the Ecto-1, seen only in Ghostbusters II, which includes more technical equipment on the vehicle's roof and digital announcement boards on each side of it. The logo is updated and added to the hood. The vehicle also sports strips of yellow and black along either side.
- A new Ecto-1 based on a 1984 Cadillac Fleetwood appears in the 2016 reboot, originating as a hearse borrowed by Patty Tolan from her uncle's funeral home. Even after being repainted, modified to carry the team's equipment, and fitted with a nuclear reactor, it retains its original red roof color. They deliberately destroy it by overloading its systems with beams from their proton packs, in order to force a swarm of invading ghosts back through the portal they had used to enter the material world.
- Ecto-1b is featured in Ghostbusters: The Video Game; the 1b is similar to the 1a, but features upgraded equipment and the addition of the Super Slammer Trap, an enhanced capacity ghost trap, on its roof.
- Ectotron is a Cybertronian who can transform into the Ecto-1. He was first introduced in the Ghostbusters/Transformers crossover comic "Ghosts of Cybertron" published by IDW Publishing, and was released as a Transformers figure by Hasbro and Takara Tomy as a GameStop and Hasbro Pulse exclusive. It was released alongside a Ghostbusters-themed MP-10 Optimus Prime.
- Ecto-2 is a small open-topped two-seater autogyro is seen in the cartoons and the comic based on them, and was released as a toy.
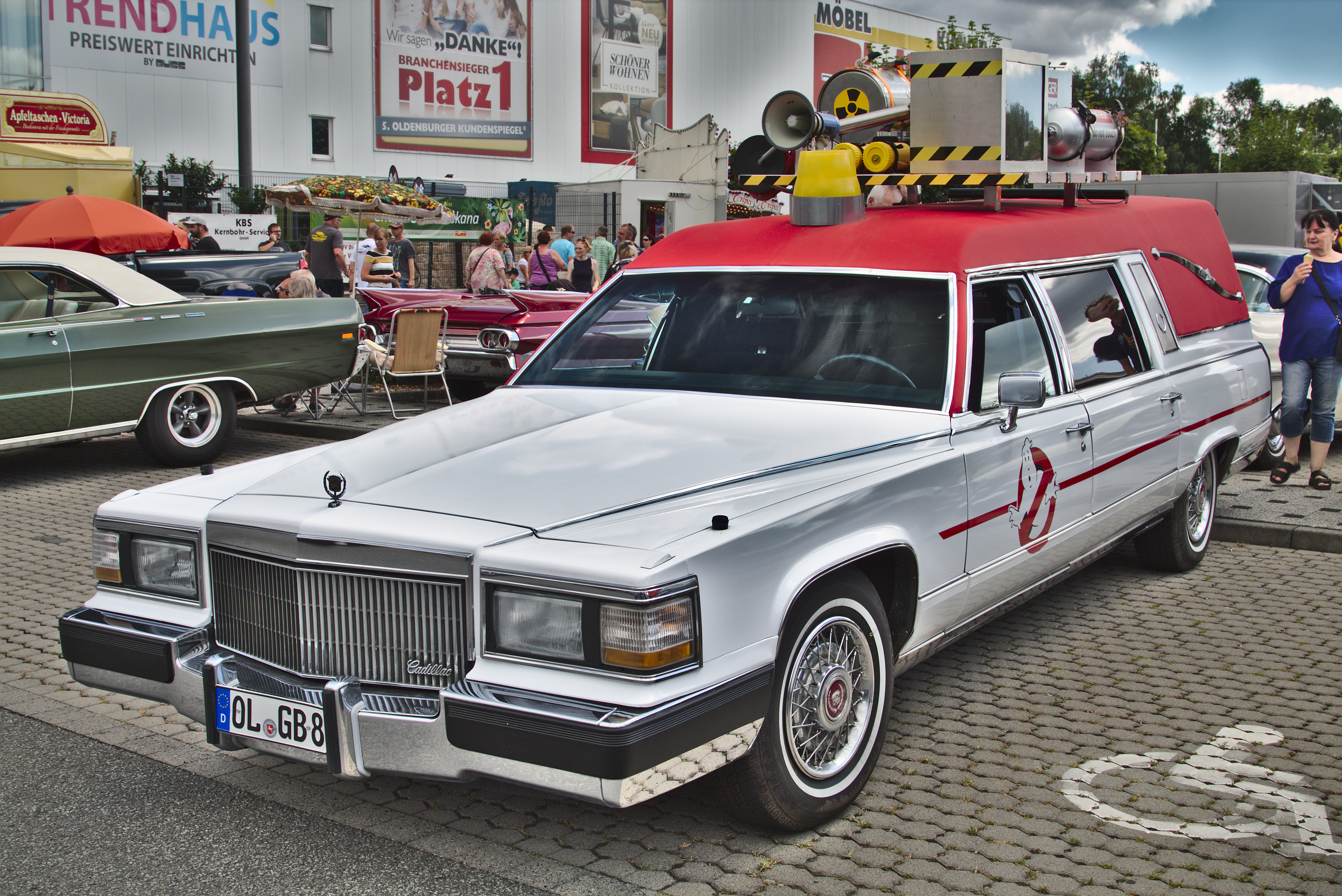
  - The 1984 Cadillac Fleetwood version used for the 2016 reboot
    In the 2016 reboot film, Ecto-2 is a white Ghostbusters motorbike provided by Kevin just before Rowan possesses him.
- Ecto-3 has been the name of four different vehicles:
  - a motorized unicycle and sidecar that slips into the Ecto-1's rear fender in the Real Ghostbusters episode "The Joke's on Ray"
  - a time-distortion jet-like vehicle invented by Egon in the comics that is renamed Ecto-4 after the cartoon's unicycle version debuted
  - a go-kart-like vehicle sold as a toy
  - a motorcycle with a sidecar that can deploy a proton pack, which appears in Ghostbusters: Frozen Empire.
- Ecto-Bomber is an airplane based on the Kenner toy.
- Extreme Ecto-1 is seen in the Extreme Ghostbusters TV series. The vehicle is equipped with new detection equipment and emergency lights, and has wheelchair access for Garrett Miller. It is mentioned that before the adaptations were made it was a 1970s Cadillac hearse.
- Ecto-Ichi (ichi means "one" in Japanese) is an extremely high tech six-wheeled Ectomobile supplied to the Ghostbusters by the Japanese government for a job in Tokyo. It can fly and travel on water, but is destroyed when a Godzilla-esque monster stepped on it.
- Ecto-8 is featured in the 2009 video game, and is a tugboat used to transport the team to Shandor island. It is driven by Ray, who refers to it as "Marine Ecto-8". Ecto-8 is identical in body to a traditional tugboat, but has a white paint scheme and the logo on the side.
- A Ghostbusters video game in development in 2007 featured a more modern version of the Ectomobile based on a stretched Chrysler 300C.
- Lego versions of the original and 2016 Ecto-1 appears in Lego Dimensions.
- Ecto-1 is available in the Planet Coaster Ghostbusters DLC.
- Ecto-Z is a van that debuts in Ghostbusters: Frozen Empire. Unlike the other Ghostbusters' vehicles, it has no modifications or weaponry.
