= The Real Ghostbusters (disambiguation) =

The Real Ghostbusters is an animated television series.

The Real Ghostbusters may also refer to:

- The Real Ghostbusters (comics), a comic series based on the television series
- The Real Ghostbusters (1987 video game), an arcade game based on the television series
- The Real Ghostbusters (1993 video game), a Game Boy video game based on the television series
- "The Real Ghostbusters" (Supernatural), a 2009 television episode
