= List of Ghostbusters video games =

The list of Ghostbusters video games covers many titles and gaming systems, and encompasses the history of the Ghostbusters media franchise since the original film's release in 1984.

== Ghostbusters (1984) ==
Ghostbusters was designed by David Crane for the Commodore 64 and published by Activision in 1984. It was ported to other home computers, the Atari 2600, Master System and Nintendo Entertainment System.

Ghostbusters on the Commodore 64 (1984)

Crane wrote the game in six weeks, based in part on an incomplete project called Car Wars about armed automobiles in a city. This led to the "ghost vacuum" on the Ecto-1, something not present in the film. Activision obtained the license early in the film's production, and most of the game was finished by the time Crane watched the film. While pleased with the game, Crane later stated that he regretted not being able to include a better victory screen. The last week of development was spent on the opening screen which plays the Ghostbusters theme song.

The Master System version (1987) added an on-foot shooting gallery level with different animations, while the NES version (1988), ported by Japanese developer Bits Laboratory, made the action sequences considerably more difficult, had higher graphical resolution and provided a different ending. The ending in the NES version is full of spelling, grammar and punctuation mistakes:

== The Real Ghostbusters (1987) ==
The arcade version of The Real Ghostbusters (1987)

The Real Ghostbusters is an arcade video game based on the cartoon series of the same name. It was released by Data East in 1987, then ported to the Amiga, Amstrad CPC, Atari ST, Commodore 64, and ZX Spectrum. In Japan, the arcade version is known as Meikyūu Hunter G (迷宮ハンターG, Labyrinth Hunter G), and does not use the Ghostbusters license.

== Ghostbusters II video game ==
Ghostbusters II was released for several home computer and console systems. It is loosely based on the film of the same name.

=== Computers ===
The home computer editions were published by Activision. Each version of the game includes a level in which the Statue of Liberty is controlled by the player and a final battle with Vigo the Carpathian.

The MS-DOS game is different from the others and begins with a level in which the Ghostbusters battle the Scoleri brothers in a courtroom, as in the film. If the player loses a challenge, the player's Ghostbuster character is institutionalized in a mental ward but can be rescued by one of the other Ghostbusters. The other computer versions of the game feature three levels based on scenes from the film.

=== NES ===
Activision's NES edition of the game is a single-player side-scrolling game where the player controls a Ghostbuster through various stages based on the film, making their way to the museum before time runs out. Two levels involves riding around in the heroes' famous car and another level requires the player to control the Statue of Liberty, shooting fireballs. The game was noted for being exceptionally hard to complete.

=== New Ghostbusters II ===
A version of the game was released in Europe and Japan for the NES and Game Boy, titled New Ghostbusters II, developed by HAL Laboratory. It is more of a straightforward action game than the Activision game. The Game Boy version was released in America without the New label. Notable for allowing players to choose from all five ghostbusters from the end of the film; Peter, Ray, Egon, Winston, and Louis Tully.

=== Atari 2600 ===
Activision developed a version of the game for the Atari 2600 which was published in 1989. British company Salu released the game in Europe in 1992, after Atari had already ended support for the 2600.

== Ghostbusters (1990), Mega Drive/Genesis ==
Ghostbusters was developed and published by Sega for the Mega Drive/Genesis in 1990. It is unrelated to Activision's initial Ghostbusters game, and is instead a platform shoot 'em up game in which the player chooses to play as one of three Ghostbusters from the films; Winston Zeddemore is excluded from the game. Four levels are available initially; after they are completed, a fifth level is unlocked, followed by a sixth and final level. Each level contains a number (usually two) of mid-bosses known as "middle ghosts"; after a middle ghost is defeated, it turns into a small green ghost which can be captured for extra money by luring it over a ghost trap. Between levels, money can be used to buy power-ups, such as a 3-way shot or recovery items.

The Ghostbusters are down on their luck due to lack of ghost activity, when suddenly several calls begin to pour in from around the city, including the eventual reappearance of the Stay Puft Marshmallow Man (although dialogue indicates it is not the same one from the movie). After each case, a piece of a stone tablet is collected. The three Ghostbusters piece together the mysterious tablet, inadvertently opening a portal to "the evil world" and releasing a horde of ghosts. In the end, though, the Ghostbusters manage to defeat Janna, the God of Darkness, and retrieve a mystical gem from the evil world. They combine the gem with the tablet to close the portal, and save the city.

== The Real Ghostbusters (1993), Game Boy ==
The 1993 The Real Ghostbusters game was developed by Kemco and published in North America by Activision for the Game Boy. In it, the player played as Peter Venkman. The game is based on Kemco's Crazy Castle franchise and features similar puzzle-oriented gameplay. This game was released in Europe as Garfield Labyrinth and in Japan as Mickey Mouse IV: Mahou no Labyrinth (ミッキーマウスIV 魔法のラビリンス, lit. "Mickey Mouse IV: The Magical Labyrinth"), which features different characters and licenses for both versions.

== Extreme Ghostbusters series ==
=== Extreme Ghostbusters ===
Extreme Ghostbusters was released on April 2, 2001, by Light and Shadow Productions for the Game Boy Color exclusively in Europe. It was originally thought to be intended for multiple consoles and the personal computer. It includes four playable characters including Kylie, Garett, Roland, and Eduardo. Each character has unique gameplay attributes and may be chosen at any point in the game. Set in New York City, players must defeat and either capture or destroy ghosts.

=== Extreme Ghostbusters: Zap the Ghosts! ===
Extreme Ghostbusters: Zap the Ghosts! was released in December 2001 by Light and Shadow Productions for Windows PCs exclusively in Europe. The game is a clone of the game Bust-A-Move. It includes Arcade, Contest, Challenge, and Edit modes.

=== Extreme Ghostbusters Creativity Center ===
Extreme Ghostbusters Creativity Center was released in 2001 by Light and Shadow Productions for Windows PCs exclusively in Europe.

=== Extreme Ghostbusters (pachinko machine) ===
An Extreme Ghostbusters pachinko machine was released in 2001 by Fuji Shogi.

=== Extreme Ghostbusters: Code Ecto-1 ===
Extreme Ghostbusters: Code Ecto-1
- Developer: Magic Pockets
- Publishers: EU: Light & Shadow Production, Wanadoo Edition; NA: DreamCatcher Interactive
- Series: Ghostbusters
- Platform: Game Boy Advance
- Release: EU: 2002-04-05; NA: 2002-12-30
- Mode: Single-player

It is a Game Boy Advance video game based on Extreme Ghostbusters. The half-human/half-demon Count Mercharior has kidnapped Roland and Garett, two key members of the Ghostbusters team. The remaining team members, Eduardo and Kylie, immediately set off to find them, determined to capture the ghosts who have come to invade the city. The game is a combination platform and shooter game with some races, using a top-down perspective. There are 12 platform levels and four regions.

=== Extreme Ghostbusters: The Ultimate Invasion ===
Extreme Ghostbusters: The Ultimate Invasion
- Developer: Similis Software GmbH
- Publisher: EU: Light & Shadow Production
- Series: Ghostbusters
- Platform: PlayStation
- Release: EU: 2004-03-12
- Mode: Single-player

A video game that is similar to Time Crisis. Players would choose from one of the four Extreme Ghostbusters and play through various missions set in New York. It can be used with gun con. There are two kinds of shots that can be fired, using a proton cartridge like what is seen in the show. There is a standard mini proton shot, similar to a bullet fire, that uses 1/10 of cartridge, or a proton beam, which uses 5/10 a proton cartridge. There are 3 game modes: Adventure, Training, and Replay.

== Ghostbusters (2006), mobile ==
A top down puzzle game was released in 2006 for cell phones on Verizon, Sprint, T-Mobile, and Cingular (now AT&T) networks. The story revolves around the Ghostbusters being hired by a millionaire tycoon to rid his home of ghosts, but the story does not go beyond that with no cut scenes or dialog during the game. Ultimately, Ghostbusters mobile was panned critically due to its extreme length (over 100 rooms to enter), plain gameplay design (gathering colored keys, pushing statues, activating switches), and no real references to any of the original Ghostbusters characters or movies, besides the opening theme music.

== Ghostbusters: The Video Game (2009) ==
Ghostbusters: The Video Game is a video game for Xbox 360, PlayStation 3, Wii, PlayStation 2, PlayStation Portable, Nintendo DS and PC. The game was originally slated for an October 2008 release. ZootFly began independently developing the game in May 2006 but hit a "bump in the road" with regard to the Ghostbusters copyright in July 2006. Vivendi Universal acquired the rights to make the game, which was developed by Terminal Reality for the PlayStation 3, PC and Xbox 360, and by Red Fly Studios for the Wii, DS and PS2. Harold Ramis has said that he and Aykroyd, in addition to contributing to the game's script, did voiceover for the Ghostbusters video game. It was released in June 2009 for the U.S. and EU on the PlayStation formats (due to a publishing deal by Sony Computer Entertainment Europe), and November for other formats in the EU. As the Xbox 360 version of the game is region free, it can be played on any Xbox 360 console. A remastered version developed by Saber Interactive was released in 2019 for PlayStation 4, Xbox One, Nintendo Switch and PC through Epic Games Store.

== Ghostbusters (pachinko) (2010) ==
A Ghostbusters pachinko machine was released in 2010 by Fuji Shogi. It was the second Ghostbusters pachinko machine after the Extreme Ghostbusters pachinko machine.

== Ghostbusters: Sanctum of Slime (2011) ==
Ghostbusters: Sanctum of Slime is a video game for download for Xbox Live Arcade, PlayStation Network, and PC. It is a sequel to Ghostbusters: The Video Game. It features 4 ghostbusters defeating ghosts. The game received negative reviews.

== Ghostbusters: Paranormal Blast (2012), mobile ==
Ghostbusters: Paranormal Blast was a location-based augmented reality mobile game launched by XMG Studio in August 2012, that was available for sale in the iTunes App Store. As of 2023 it is no longer accessible.

The game allowed users to take the perspective of a Ghostbuster, catching ghosts in their own cities.

== Ghostbusters (2013), mobile ==
Ghostbusters is a mobile game available for download from Beeline Interactive. Players start out with three new Ghostbusters in Michelle Ying, Tara Fitzpatrick, and Michael Prince. A fourth Ghostbuster, Joel Holowinsky, is available for purchase with money earned in game. Others can also be purchased, including Peter Venkman, Egon Spengler, Winston Zeddemore, and Ray Stantz, for 50 power cores each (which cost real world money). The game has three types of Ghostbusters: 1) Wrangler - used to weaken ghosts, 2) Blasters - used primarily for their offensive capabilities, and 3) Scientists - used primarily for healing Ghostbusters. The story centers around the male student that Peter Venkman kept shocking during his ESP "experiment" at the beginning of the first film. The man is contacted by a mysterious force promising him a way to get vengeance against Peter. The game instantly flashes forward to after the second film, where we see that the man now is a ghost with telepathic powers. He takes over a 50-story building where each floor serves as a separate level for Ghostbusters to defeat.

== Ghostbusters Pinball (2014), mobile ==
Ghostbusters Pinball is pinball game released in 2014 for mobile and developed by FarSight Studios.

== Lego Dimensions (2015) ==
The crossover toys-to-life game Lego Dimensions developed by Traveller's Tales features content based on both the original Ghostbusters and its 2016 remake. A "level pack" includes an additional level that recreates the events of the original film and adds Peter Venkman as a playable character, with the unlockable ability to play as the other three Ghostbusters. A "story pack" offers an extended six-level story campaign retelling the events of the 2016 film, and includes a playable Abby Yates, who can also be used to play as the other three Ghostbusters. Additional "fun packs" add Slimer and Stay Puft as playable characters.

== Ghostbusters (2016) ==
A video game based on 2016 film was published by Activision for PlayStation 4, Xbox One and PC. The game was developed by California-based FireForge Games. It was critically panned, being the worst reviewed game of 2016. Three days after its release and $12 million in debt, FireForge filed for bankruptcy.

== Ghostbusters: Slime City (2016), mobile ==
A mobile game called Ghostbusters: Slime City was published by Activision for mobile phones developed by EightPixelsSquare. It was launched in July 2016 along with Ghostbusters. The game lets players be a Ghostbuster member and save New York City from new threats, and collect powerful ghosts to rise to the top of the leaderboards. Players can upgrade their own headquarters and complete jobs around the city for new weapons and rewards.

== Ghostbusters World (2018), mobile ==
An augmented reality (AR) mobile game called Ghostbusters World was developed by NextAge as part of a collaboration between publishing partner FourThirtyThree Inc. (4:33), Columbia Pictures, and Ghost Corps. Like Pokémon Go, players use smart devices to find and catch "specters, ghosts, and apparitions" from "all dimensions of the franchise", including the films, TV shows, comic books, theme parks, and video games. There are new ghosts to capture created especially for the game. Erik Burnham, the writer from the ongoing Ghostbusters IDW comic series had involvement with the game. The game was released in October 2018.

== Lego Legacy: Heroes Unboxed (2020) ==
The crossover online game Lego Legacy: Heroes Unboxed, developed by Gameloft and released exclusively for Microsoft Windows, Android, and iOS devices on 27 February 2020, includes Peter Venkman, Ray Stanz, Egon Spengler, Winston Zeddemore, and Slimer as playable characters. They are the first licensed characters in the game.

== Ghostbusters: Afterlife ScARe (2021), mobile ==
Ghostbusters: Afterlife ScARe is an augmented reality (AR) mobile game for Android and iOS inspired by the 2021 film, Ghostbusters: Afterlife. Developed by Imprezario Entertainment, and published by Sony Pictures Entertainment, and Ghost Corps, the game sets players in the Jason Reitman film as they seek to defend their surroundings amid an oncoming apocalypse. The game features original footage of various cast members from Ghostbusters: Afterlife; including Finn Wolfhard as Trevor Spengler, and Logan Kim as Podcast. The game was written by Steven Shea of Abyssmal Entertainment . The nostalgia band The Flux Capacitors provided the game's title musical track heard during gameplay and in the official trailer.

== Ghostbusters: Spirits Unleashed (2022) ==
Ghostbusters: Spirits Unleashed was released on October 18, 2022, for Microsoft Windows, PlayStation 4, PlayStation 5, Xbox One and Xbox Series X/S. The game also features the likenesses and voices of Ernie Hudson as Winston Zeddemore and Dan Aykroyd as Raymond "Ray" Stantz.

== Ghostbusters: Rise of the Ghost Lord (2023) ==
Ghostbusters: Rise of the Ghost Lord was released on October 26, 2023, for the Meta Quest 2, Meta Quest 3, Meta Quest Pro and the PlayStation VR2. The game is set in San Francisco, featuring locations from the city such as the Golden Gate Bridge and follows a new team of Ghostbusters who work together to stop the Ghost Lord and his minions.

== Ghostbusters (redemption game) ==
A Ghostbusters redemption game was scheduled to be released in 2026 by Konami.
