= Ghostbusters (2013 video game) =

- App icon
- Developer: Beeline Interactive
- Publisher: Beeline Interactive
- Series: Ghostbusters
- Platform: iOS
- Release: January 24, 2013
- Genre: Action
- Mode: Single-player

Ghostbusters is an action game developed and published by Beeline Interactive for iOS in 2013.

== Gameplay ==
Players start out with three new Ghostbusters in Michelle Ying, Tara Fitzpatrick, and Michael Prince. A fourth Ghostbuster, Joel Holowinsky, is available for purchase with money earned in game. Others can also be purchased, including Peter Venkman, Egon Spengler, Winston Zeddemore, and Ray Stantz, for 50 power cores each (which cost real world money). The game has three types of Ghostbusters: 1) Wrangler - used to weaken ghosts, 2) Blasters - used primarily for their offensive capabilities, and 3) Scientists - used primarily for healing Ghostbusters.

== Story ==
The story centers around the male student that Peter Venkman kept shocking during his ESP "experiment" at the beginning of the first film. The man is contacted by a mysterious force promising him a way to get vengeance against Peter. The game instantly flashes forward to after the second film, where we see that the man now is a ghost with telepathic powers. He takes over a 50-story building where each floor serves as a separate level for Ghostbusters to defeat.

== Reception ==
Reception

Aggregate score
Aggregator	Score
Metacritic	66/100

Review scores
Publication	Score
Computer and Video Games	6/10
Eurogamer	1/10
Gamezebo	4/5
Pocket Gamer	2/5
Digital Spy	3/5

The game received "average" reviews according to the review aggregation website Metacritic.
