= Ghostbusters (2016 video game) =

2016 video game

- Developer: FireForge Games
- Publisher: Activision
- Writers: Jordana Arkin; Dan Glasl
- Composer: Grant Kirkhope
- Series: Ghostbusters
- Engine: Unreal Engine 4
- Platforms: Windows, PlayStation 4, Xbox One
- Release: NA: July 12, 2016; PAL: July 15, 2016
- Genres: Action, twin-stick shooter
- Modes: Single-player, multiplayer

Ghostbusters is an action video game developed by FireForge Games and published by Activision for Microsoft Windows, PlayStation 4 and Xbox One. Taking place after the events of the 2016 film, the game features four-player cooperative gameplay where players control new Ghostbusters characters to defeat enemy ghosts.

The game had a development cycle of eight months and was released in July 2016.

The game was panned by critics and considered one of the worst video games of 2016.

== Plot ==
The game is set some time after the events of the 2016 film. The four protagonists from the film are only mentioned though, as they are called away to Washington to save the President from ghost assassins. The game instead focuses on four different protagonists named Chaz, Meadow, Megan and Bobby, who watch over and do the duties of the other four. Later, they are called to Aldridge mansion to capture the ghost of Gertrude Aldridge after she has returned to her home. After capturing her, the four later get a call from a crypt keeper saying that a ghost of voodoo gang leader, Marie Deveuax, has rising from the grave and is now haunting people. After arriving at the graveyard she was seen at, the four battle and capture her, and afterward they get a call from two teenagers reporting that a run-down asylum is being haunted by the ghosts of past workers and one with electrical powers. They find out the main ghost is actually Sparky from the movie, who attacks them and, after the battle, they capture him.

Later, they get a call from a construction worker revealing that a devil ghost from the movie, named Rampage, is in the sewers and needs to be captured. After finding and battling Rampage, the gang capture him and later get a call from a ship cruise manager named Morgan who reveals that a ghost of former singer, Ruby d'Amore, has come back from the dead and needs to be caught. After completing the mission, they get a call from Mayor Bradley revealing Roman (the antagonist from the movie) has returned and opened up a portal from Limbo and is exacting his revenge. He asks the Ghostbusters to help defeat him, and after a lengthy battle, they defeat him again and celebrate. The game ends with a newspaper falsely saying that it was Mayor Bradley who saved New York; yet despite this, the Ghostbusters are happy knowing they saved New York.

== Gameplay ==
The game is an isometric 2.5D action game using a top-down camera. Up to four players can play at the same time, controlling one of the four characters. Each character has a different proton pack. One resembles a gatling gun, while another resembles a pistol.

== Reception ==
Reception

Aggregate score
Aggregator	Score
Metacritic	(PC) 38/100 (XONE) 32/100 (PS4) 30/100

Review scores
Publication	Score
Destructoid	2/10
Electronic Gaming Monthly	2/10
Game Informer	4/10
GameSpot	3/10
Hardcore Gamer	1.5/5
IGN	4.4/10
PlayStation Official Magazine – UK	3/10
Official Xbox Magazine (UK)	3/10
Polygon	2/10
Push Square	2/10
Digital Spy	2/5
Metro	2/10

Ghostbusters received strongly negative reviews, according to the review aggregation website Metacritic; the site acknowledged it as being the worst-reviewed game of 2016, noting that unlike the film (which "somewhat delivered what it promised"), the game "asks that you fork over even more cash for what reviewers described as a humorless slog."

Polygon's Justin McElroy argued that the PS4 version was "the most gruelingly insipid dual-stick shooter" he had ever reviewed, lacking variety insofar that it was a "perfect prison of monotony from which no fun could ever escape." He criticized the game's poor characterization and humor, joking that it made a commercial for Ghostbusters cereal "look like a 4K Blu-ray transfer of the 1984 film by comparison", and concluded that the game was a "deplorable, cynical bit of licensed drivel that wouldn't be worth the $50 asking price if the instruction manual were printed on a $50 bill." GameSpot was similarly critical of the same PS4 version, noting a lack of variety in gameplay, environments and enemy design, but did praise the soundtrack for "[evoking] the proper nostalgia". GameSpot felt that the previous Sanctum of Slime game was marginally better, and concluded that "Ghostbusters has rare moments when it doesn't feel like an utter waste of time. But it's mostly a bizarre slog through mostly empty, overly cumbersome levels full of extreme repetition."

Three days after the game was released, FireForge Games filed for bankruptcy and ended up being approximately $12 million in debt.
