= Ghostbusters: Frozen Empire (soundtrack) =

Ghostbusters: Frozen Empire (Original Motion Picture Soundtrack)

Film score by Dario Marianelli
- Released: March 22, 2024
- Recorded: 2023–2024
- Genre: Film score
- Length: 61:24
- Label: Sony Classical
- Producer: Dario Marianelli

Dario Marianelli chronology
A Boy Called Christmas (2021)	Ghostbusters: Frozen Empire (2024)	Federer: Twelve Final Days (2024)

Ghostbusters: Frozen Empire (Original Motion Picture Soundtrack) is the soundtrack to the 2024 film Ghostbusters: Frozen Empire, the sequel to Ghostbusters: Afterlife (2021) and the fifth film in the Ghostbusters franchise. The film's original score was composed by Dario Marianelli, and was released through Sony Classical Records on March 22, 2024.

== Background ==
On January 18, 2024, it was announced that Italian composer Dario Marianelli would score music for the film, replacing Rob Simonsen, who previously scored the predecessor; this film marked Marianelli's second collaboration with director Gil Kenan after A Boy Called Christmas (2021). He recorded the score at the Barbra Streisand Scoring Stage at the Sony Pictures Studios in Culver City, California.

On March 7, 2024, Japanese girl group Atarashii Gakko! released a track called "Ghostbusters: Frozen Summer" as a collaboration with Sony Pictures Entertainment Japan, which samples the titular song for the 1984 film by Ray Parker Jr. The score album was released through Sony Classical Records, digitally on March 22 and in physical CDs on April 12.

== Critical reception ==
Filmtracks.com wrote "Marianelli's competent and occasionally impressive toil for this film simply reinforces the achievement realized by Simonsen for the previous film." Anton Smit of Soundtrack World wrote "Marianelli did a stellar job mixing his creative mind with Bernstein's legacy, which is worthy for the next generation of Ghostbusters."

== Track listing ==
Ghostbusters: Frozen Empire (Original Motion Picture Soundtrack) track listing
No.	Title	Length
1.	"Manhattan Adventurers Society"	1:56
2.	"The Sewer Dragon"	4:09
3.	"Firehouse"	0:58
4.	"Ray's Occult"	1:53
5.	"A Ghost in the Attic"	1:23
6.	"Chess in the Park"	2:28
7.	"When the Light is Green.."	1:19
8.	"Paranormal Research Center"	3:09
9.	"A Call"	0:40
10.	"The Orb"	1:52
11.	"A Tour of the Firehouse"	3:07
12.	"Slimer"	1:13
13.	"Dadi's Secret Room"	1:32
14.	"Should We Investigate?"	1:46
15.	"Dr. Wartzki"	3:52
16.	"Patience"	3:04
17.	"Golden Years"	1:11
18.	"It's Your Turn"	1:46
19.	"Ionic Separator"	3:58
20.	"Now He Can Control You"	1:11
21.	"The Horns"	1:45
22.	"Back to Headquarters"	1:06
23.	"New Proton Packs"	2:21
24.	"Possessor's Mistake"	2:02
25.	"Was Any of it Real?"	2:18
26.	"Last Frozen Stand"	4:11
27.	"The Thawing"	1:52
28.	"In the Fabric of the Universe"	3:22
Total length:		61:24

== Chart performance ==
Chart performance for Ghostbusters: Frozen Empire (Original Motion Picture Soundtrack)
Chart (2024)	Peak position
Scottish Albums (OCC)	72
UK Album Sales (OCC)	49
UK Physical Albums (OCC)	48
UK Soundtrack Albums (OCC)	1
