= Smiffys =

British fancy dress manufacturer

Smiffys is a British wholesale, fancy dress manufacturer specialising in party fashion, leisure and entertainment products.

Founded in 1894 by Robert Henry Smith, Smiffys began as a wigmakers making court and surgical wigs, and today is part of the R H Smith & Sons (Wigmakers Ltd) group. As a fancy dress, halloween, carnival and World Book Day manufacturing company in the UK, the company distributes nearly 5,000 products to over 1,700 stockists around the world with over 26 million items shipped every year.

The company head office is in Gainsborough, Lincolnshire, and their creative services team is based in Central Park, Leeds, where products are designed and created. However, in October 2016, in the wake of the Brexit Referendum, the company commercial director, Elliott Peckett, announced that it would open a new headquarters in the Netherlands to safeguard access to its markets and talent pools.

The company supplies dressing up costumes, wigs and accessories under the brands Smiffys and Fever, and currently employs 250 people. R H Smith & Sons brands include the Time4Fun range of children's toy and leisure items, Fever, a lingerie collection, and Smiffys.
