= Ray Stantz =

Fictional character from Ghostbusters

- Ghostbusters character
- Ray Stantz as portrayed by Dan Aykroyd
- First appearance: Ghostbusters (1984)
- Created by: Dan Aykroyd; Harold Ramis
- Portrayed by: Dan Aykroyd
- Voiced by: Dan Aykroyd (Ghostbusters: The Video Game, Planet Coaster, Ghostbusters: Spirits Unleashed, Ghostbusters: Rise of the Ghost Lord); Frank Welker (The Real Ghostbusters, Extreme Ghostbusters guest star)

In-universe information
- Full name: Raymond Stantz
- Nickname: Ray
- Species: Human
- Gender: Male
- Title: PhD
- Occupation: Scientist; Ghostbuster; Shopkeeper
- Nationality: American

Raymond Stantz, PhD, is a fictional character from the Ghostbusters franchise. He is a member of the Ghostbusters and one of the three Columbia University professors of parapsychology, along with Dr. Peter Venkman and Dr. Egon Spengler.

Ray Stantz debuted in Ghostbusters (1984) portrayed by Dan Aykroyd, who would portray the character in Ghostbusters II (1989), Casper (1995, as a cameo), Ghostbusters: Afterlife (2021) and Ghostbusters: Frozen Empire (2024).

The character is voiced by Frank Welker in the animated television series The Real Ghostbusters and Extreme Ghostbusters. The character is also present in the video games Beeline's Ghostbusters, Ghostbusters: The Video Game (2009), Planet Coaster (2019), Ghostbusters: Spirits Unleashed (2022) and Ghostbusters: Rise of the Ghost Lord (2024).

== Character ==
Ray is an expert on paranormal history and metallurgy. He is characterised by his almost childlike enthusiasm towards his work, and his forthright acceptance of paranormal activity. As a result, Peter once during the movie referred to him as "the heart of the Ghostbusters". Ray has extensive knowledge of the Bible (to the point of even quoting a specific book and chapter—"I remember Revelation 7:12"—about the end of the world, though the passage he quotes is actually Revelation 6:12), but is an agnostic, commenting when asked if he believes in God, "Never met Him". As revealed in Ghostbusters: The Video Game, Ray attended a seminary at some stage in his life. He is known for his wordy and overly technical explanations of scientific and paranormal phenomena. Ray, along with Egon, is responsible for pioneering the Ghostbusters' theories and designing and building the equipment used for catching and containing ghosts. In the second film, it is revealed that they are fond of takeout foods like pizzas and of Asian, Greek, and Mexican cuisine.

== Appearances ==
=== Film ===
==== Ghostbusters (1984) ====
Before being kicked out of the university, Ray devoted a lot of his workday to interviewing people who had some sort of encounter with the paranormal. After the entanglement with the library ghost, Ray was more motivated to continue on with that type of work. When the guys were let go by Dean Yager, he was initially crushed, primarily concerned with his academic integrity, financial stability, etc. Ray had briefly worked in the private sector beforehand, and knew it was not conducive to his line of work, as they expected results. In the film's novelization, it is stated that Ray's father was a physician, and his mother was a housewife. He has one older brother Carl (who is an Air Force officer with two sons) and a younger sister Jean (a journalist living in California with one daughter). However, Ray and his siblings are not in contact with each other since their parents' deaths.

After talking with Peter Venkman and Egon Spengler, they decided to try hunting ghosts full-time. Ray mortgaged the house he was born in to provide the starting capital to get the company started and lease the firehouse. In addition, he rummaged through used car lots and purchased a dilapidated 1959 Cadillac Miller-Meteor Sentinel which was restored to make the Ecto-1.

Stantz also has the distinction of being the first Ghostbuster to meet Slimer, initially dropping his cigarette in fear. He then attempted to proton blast the ghost after his call for assistance was unheard by Venkman.

He was later partnered with newly hired Winston Zeddemore, with whom he became good friends.

Ray accidentally chose the form of Gozer's Destructor form based on his childhood memories at Camp Waconda, initially thought of what he believed is harmless, but later regret it after seeing the giant Stay Puft Marshmallow Man's rampage across the city. Despite his initial attempt at negotiations, he wound up fighting Gozer with his Proton Pack. After reversing the particle flow to force Gozer back into his realm, during which Ray used himself to shield Winston from the explosion and melted marshmallow, and they both survived. He then concerned about the other guys' welfare, and celebrated with them afterwards.

==== Ghostbusters II (1989) ====
In the second film, following the decline of the Ghostbusters' business, Stantz and Winston were entertainers for parties, where they were repeatedly debased by children. When he was not doing that, he was running his bookstore, Ray's Occult Books, located on St. Mark's Place, a store dedicated to occult studies and the paranormal, selling books and metaphysical supplies. It is implied by Venkman that two years prior, the team had used their proton packs for a secret adventure. When Dana Barrett comes to Egon and later Ray, it becomes clear that something supernatural was once again happening underneath New York City. After the Ghostbusters' business resumes, the team uses Ray's bookstore's resources for information regarding the supernatural.

During the investigation on Vigo's painting, while Venkman taunts it, Ray notices Vigo's eyes glowed and caught under his spell, turning Ray into Vigo's sleeper agent by subtly controlling Ray's subconscious and allowing Vigo to spy on the Ghostbusters through their telepathic link. Ray and Egon experiment with the psychomagnotheric slime they find and eventually discover a way to not only positively charge the slime, but utilize it to animate objects, including the Statue of Liberty in their final assault on Vigo the Carpathian. Ray also briefly becomes the host for Vigo himself, but a liberal dousing of the positively charged mood slime quickly cures him of that.

==== Casper (1995) ====
Dan Aykroyd has a cameo appearance as Stantz in Casper. When Carrigan and Dibs are attempting to evict the Ghostly Trio from the McFadden Manor, before contacting Dr. James Harvey, they contact Ray Stantz of the Ghostbusters. After he fails to capture the Ghostly Trio, he runs out of the manor in fear, and says to Carrigan and Dibs: "Who you gonna call? Someone else."

==== Ghostbusters: Afterlife (2021) ====
Aykroyd reprises his role as Stantz in Ghostbusters: Afterlife (2021). At some point before the disbanding of the Ghostbusters, Stantz and Egon added a scissor seat to the Ecto-1 and built radio-controlled cars (labeled remote trap vehicles or RTV for short), each loaded with a ghost trap that can match the Cadillac's speed. He returned to running Ray's Occult Books. In order to make a profit, Stantz has to expand his inventory to compete with other booksellers and metaphysical supply stores. However, unable to match the services of large bookstore chains, Stantz leases a back room to a palm reader. In a post-credits scene, it's revealed that the rent at Stantz's store is paid for by Winston. A week after Egon died, Stantz receives a phone call from Egon's granddaughter Phoebe, asking for the Ghostbusters' help against Summerville's supernatural threats. He explains that when Egon's teammates doubted his belief in the return of Gozer and the coming apocalypse, Egon stole the Ecto-1 along with the team's gear and moved to Summerville. Stantz feels especially betrayed by this act, telling her that "Egon Spengler can rot in hell", though he is remorseful upon being informed of Egon's death and Phoebe's relation to him. Phoebe's call ultimately prompts Stantz and the other surviving original Ghostbusters to travel to Summerville to assist Phoebe's team in battling Gozer. Stantz is revealed to be one of Phoebe's friend Podcast's subscribers on his vlogs about paranormal and conspiracies, and he is impressed after discovering that the person he followed is a 12-year-old.

==== Ghostbusters: Frozen Empire (2024) ====
Aykroyd reprises his role as Stantz in Ghostbusters: Frozen Empire (2024). In the film, Ray is now semi-retired from ghostbusting, remain running his bookstore while taking Podcast as his protégé, who lives in his store during summer from Summerville. It is also revealed that he quit smoking after the events of Ghostbusters II .

=== Television ===
==== The Real Ghostbusters ====
Ray has an extended family (which has different nationalities ranging from Swiss to Scottish to Russian), including his Aunt Lois (who appears in the episode, "The Spirit of Aunt Lois"), and Uncle Andrew MacMillan of Dunkeld, Scotland (who is mentioned as being deceased in "Bustman's Holiday").

Ray was born in the Bronx in 1959, according to the episodes Citizen Ghost, and "It's About Time", then later moved to Morrisville, which appears in Look Homeward Ray. The latter episode also reveals that Ray's childhood crush was a brunette named Elaine.

During the show's run he was the closest member of the team to being a pilot, having won a free flying lesson in 1976, as mentioned in You Can't Take It With You.

Ray's surname was misspelled in the series as "Stanz", in much the same way as Winston Zeddemore's surname was misspelled "Zeddmore".

Ray is the only Ghostbuster to wear the original beige jumpsuit uniform in both the animated series and the films, while the other Ghostbusters wore color coded jumpsuits in the animated series – brown for Venkman, light blue for Winston and gray-blue for Egon (presumably to help differentiate them better). Ray's voice in the animated series is similar to that of Fred Jones from Scooby-Doo, a character also voiced by Welker.

==== Extreme Ghostbusters ====
Ray appears only in the two-part series finale of Extreme Ghostbusters. After the closing down of the Ghostbusters Ray got a job at a major university. After a "minor mishap", followed by a large explosion, he has a job at Perpetual Motors, a used car company.

=== Video games ===
==== Ghostbusters: The Video Game ====
A likeness of Aykroyd, circa 1991 (the year in which the game takes place) appears in the Ghostbusters: The Video Game, that was released on June 16, 2009. Aykroyd also reprised his role for the game by voicing him. In the game, Stantz is eager to expand his knowledge in regards to researching the paranormal. More than once he asks the Rookie to collect samples and take readings for later research. Ray is also the most vocally supportive of the Rookie.

It is mentioned that the mortgage for the Ghostbusters Headquarters is in his name. His selection for the Stay Puft Marshmallow Man's form of Gozer's "Destructor Form" was mentioned in a quote "It wasn't me this time, I swear it!" when the Ghostbusters see that the Stay Puft Marshmallow Man is once again terrorizing New York. Ray is the most visibly shaken to see the Stay Puft Marshmallow Man again.

Ray is shown to possess skill in operating nautical vessels (i.e. migrant sponge observation, mentioned earlier) as he is the primary navigator on Marine Ecto-8.

One patron of Ray's occult bookstore, is unhappy because Stantz closed his store for ghostbusting endeavours, and leaves him a message on the Ghostbusters' answering machine in hope to still be able to order items from him.

==== Beeline's Ghostbusters ====
Stantz appears in Beeline's Ghostbusters game for iOS. The game was released on January 24, 2013.

==== Lego Dimensions ====
Stantz appears in Lego Dimensions, with archival audio of Dan Aykroyd being used to represent his character.

==== Ghostbusters: Spirits Unleashed ====
Aykroyd again reprised his role of Ray Stantz in 2022's asymmetrical 4v1 game Ghostbusters: Spirits Unleashed created by Illfonic. Ray continues to run his store Ray's Occult which has relocated to a building adjacent to the firehouse in the time between Ghostbusters II and the game. He, alongside Winston Zeddemore (portrayed by Ernie Hudson) work together to train a new generation of Ghostbusters. Stantz and Zeddemore act as guides for the player-character's rookie Ghostbuster and have a role in the plot of the game.

== See also ==
- List of Ghostbusters characters
