= Ghost Corps =

American production company

Ghost Corps, Inc.
- Type: Subsidiary
- Industry: Film; Merchandise; Television production
- Founded: March 1, 2015; 11 years ago
- Headquarters: 10202 West Washington Boulevard, Culver City, California, U.S.
- Key people: Dan Aykroyd; Jason Reitman
- Brands: Ghostbusters
- Parent: Columbia Pictures
- Website: www.ghostbusters.com

Ghost Corps, Inc. is an American production company formed in March 2015 to oversee the Ghostbusters media franchise and as a stock exchange for the Ghostbusters brand. It is a division of Columbia Pictures.

== History ==
The company was formed in March 2015 by Sony Pictures Entertainment in order to create a Ghostbusters cinematic universe and expand the Ghostbusters brand into films, television series, and merchandise. The company is currently headed by Jason Reitman and Dan Aykroyd, along with Montecito Picture Company partners Tom Pollock and Joe Medjuck.

== Projects ==
The company's first project, 2016's Ghostbusters, was a live-action reboot with a female-oriented cast. directed by Paul Feig, was released on July 15, 2016.

Its second project, a sequel to the original Ghostbusters films, titled Ghostbusters: Afterlife was announced by Sony Pictures and Ghost Corps. It was released in theaters on November 19, 2021. The film takes place in the original timeline set by the first two films. Jason Reitman, the son of Ghostbusters' original director Ivan Reitman, directed the sequel. A teaser trailer was released on January 14, 2019.

Ghostbusters: Frozen Empire was announced in April 2022 as the company's third project. It was originally scheduled for release on December 20, 2023, but was delayed to March 29, 2024 due to the 2023 SAG-AFTRA strike, before being moved up a week to March 22, 2024 in January 2024.

Ghostbusters: Night Shift, the company's first animated series produced in association with Sony Pictures Animation and its fourth project, is scheduled for release on Netflix in 2027.

== Filmography ==
=== Films ===
Film	Director	Release date	Budget	Gross
Ghostbusters: Answer the Call	Paul Feig	July 15, 2016	$144 million	$229 million
Ghostbusters: Afterlife	Jason Reitman	November 19, 2021	$75 million	$204.3 million
Ghostbusters: Frozen Empire	Gil Kenan	March 22, 2024	$100 million	$202 million

=== Television series ===
Series	Creator(s)/Developer(s)	Release date	Network/Platform
Ghostbusters: Night Shift	Elliott Kalan	2027	Netflix
