= Winston Zeddemore =

Fictional character from Ghostbusters

- Ghostbusters character
- Ernie Hudson as Winston Zeddemore in Ghostbusters (1984)
- First appearance: Ghostbusters (1984)
- Created by: Dan Aykroyd; Harold Ramis
- Portrayed by: Ernie Hudson
- Voiced by: Arsenio Hall (The Real Ghostbusters; 1986–1988); Buster Jones (The Real Ghostbusters; 1988–1991) (Extreme Ghostbusters; guest star); Ernie Hudson (Ghostbusters: The Video Game, Ghostbusters: Spirits Unleashed)

In-universe information
- Species: Human
- Gender: Male
- Title: PhD
- Occupation: Egyptologist; Ghostbuster; Aircraft pilot Businessman
- Religion: Christian
- Nationality: American

Winston Zeddemore, PhD, is a fictional character appearing in the Ghostbusters franchise. Zeddemore is a member of the Ghostbusters, a team of parapsychologists intent on capturing ghosts.

Winston Zeddemore debuted in the film Ghostbusters (1984), portrayed by Ernie Hudson. Hudson reprised the role for the films Ghostbusters II (1989), Ghostbusters: Afterlife (2021) and Ghostbusters: Frozen Empire (2023). Arsenio Hall voiced the character in the first three seasons of The Real Ghostbusters. Buster Jones provided Winston's voice in the remaining seasons, and reprised the role for a cameo on Extreme Ghostbusters. Hudson returned to provide his appearance and voice to Zeddemore in 2009's Ghostbusters: The Video Game and 2022's Ghostbusters: Spirits Unleashed.

== Conception and creation ==
In the original script for Ghostbusters, Winston Zeddemore was intended to be part of the Ghostbusters team from the beginning, a former "Air Force major something, a demolitions expert". This was revised in subsequent drafts after Hudson was cast. His character was originally intended to represent the audience, but was rewritten to be "an outsider and a late addition" to the Ghostbusters team. He was the only member of the team who did not have an advanced degree, although it was later shown that he acquired his doctorate in Ghostbusters: The Video Game.

Veteran actor Yaphet Kotto auditioned and was offered the role, but had to drop out due to other commitments. After working with him the previous year on Trading Places, Dan Aykroyd originally wanted Eddie Murphy to play the role of Winston Zeddemore. Aware of his comic abilities, his characterization of Winston would have been in a semi-improvisational style, similar to Bill Murray's performance as Peter Venkman. Murphy was too busy shooting Beverly Hills Cop to commit. Gregory Hines was also considered for the part.

== Appearances ==
=== Film and television ===
==== Ghostbusters (1984) ====
Winston Zeddemore's first on-screen appearance is in the movie Ghostbusters, when he responds to a help-wanted advertisement the team has posted in an attempt to deal with their sizable workload. Questioned extensively during his application by Janine Melnitz as to whether he believes in a large number of supernatural occurrences and beings (such as UFOs, the Loch Ness Monster and the theory of Atlantis among others), Zeddemore replies, "If there's a steady paycheck in it, I'll believe anything you say." When Ray Stantz and Peter Venkman return from a call, Janine introduces Zeddemore to them and Stantz immediately hires him. In the film's novelization, it is stated that Zeddemore has recently been discharged from Strategic Air Command, and has moved in with his mother Lucille while he looks for work and an apartment. He is college-educated and had electronic countermeasures training. Further, Ray is impressed at Zeddemore's military backgrounds along with his proficiency in karate and firearms handling, after reviewing his resume. Despite not being a scientist, Zeddemore is highly intelligent and soon learns to operate the team's equipment. Later in the movie, having seen the level of paranormal activity present in the city, he remarks, "This job is definitely not worth eleven-five [$11,500] a year!" He is partnered with Stantz and they become friends, and they share responsibility on the maintenance of the team's Cadillac Ecto-1.

Zeddemore is a religious man to some extent, saying in a discussion in Ghostbusters that he believes in God and "loves Jesus' style". While driving the Ecto-1 with Stantz, he voices his thoughts that the sudden spike in ghost appearances might be a sign of the apocalypse, pointing out that while they have come to treat capturing ghosts as routine pest control, in a very real sense the dead are literally "rising from the grave", potentially an omen of the apocalypse.

Though Zeddemore has no previous background in paranormal studies and is not initially a firm believer in the existence of the paranormal, he readily accepts the existence of ghosts and the supernatural as he encounters them as a Ghostbuster. He also rises to the challenge and proves very skilled and dependable team member. However, he continues to act as an "everyman" and voice of reason for the team, and when the jailed Ghostbusters seriously propose asking a federal judge to release them because they must fight an invading god, Zeddemore reminds the others that no one will believe their claims. Despite this, when meeting with the Mayor of New York he offers himself as a somewhat impartial observer, due to only having joined the team recently, and assures the mayor that the phenomena are real.

==== Ghostbusters II (1989) ====
At the start of the sequel Ghostbusters II, the team has been forced out of business due to legal injunctions and property damage lawsuits. Zeddemore and Stantz work as unpopular children's entertainers, but rejoin the team after the ban against them is lifted. Winston later develops a dislike against Vigo the Carpathian after learning his atrocious past from Egon and Ray, and calls him an "ugly dude" after seeing his portrait. He helps Stantz and Egon Spengler investigate a mysterious river of slime under the city and, in the process, revealed to have fears of underground pests like roaches and rodents before they encounter a number of specters that haunt the city's subway tunnels and then being "hit" by a phantom vehicle of a train that derailed in the 1920s. Later, he helps them pilot the Statue of Liberty (suffused with slime charged by positive emotions) through New York City to rally the public and defeat the spirit of Vigo the Carpathian. Ray remarks that the slime reminds him of Jell-O, a dessert Winston hates.

==== Ghostbusters: Afterlife (2021) ====
Hudson reprised his role as Zeddemore in Ghostbusters: Afterlife (2021). In the years since the Ghostbusters business collapsed, Winston has started a successful global enterprise, crediting his time as a Ghostbuster as his inspiration to start it. Despite his successes, Winston remains loyal to his friends and still thinks fondly of being a Ghostbuster, ready to return to action. It is also revealed that he is married, and it is stated by Winston that his children are aware that he was a Ghostbuster. In the final act of the film, he arrives with Venkman and Ray to help the Spengler family deal with a returned Gozer. At the end of the film, being sentimental of his past, Winston buys the team's old firehouse headquarters back from Starbucks, and has the Ecto-1 restored and delivered there. Janine Melnitz knows that he has been paying the rent on Ray's occult bookstore for some time, as a way of honoring their friendship. Regarding his time on the team, Zeddemore remarks, "I may be a businessman, but I will always be a Ghostbuster."

==== Ghostbusters: Frozen Empire (2024) ====
Winston now serves as the financier behind the Ghostbusters. He has reacquired the firehouse and given custody of it to the Spengler family as well as having acquired an old aquarium to serve as a Paranormal Research Center, housing an upgraded and expanded Containment Unit, an engineering department to develop new ghostbusting equipment and several researchers in the paranormal. He has taken on Lucky as an intern. He still loves being a Ghostbuster but has also become more practical in his advanced age, at one point lecturing Ray when his investigation into Garakka led him, Phoebe Spengler and Podcast into danger. However, he is quick to suit up again when Garakka threatens the city and he and the original Ghostbusters are instrumental in the final battle in finally trapping the entity. He also comes to the Spengler family's aid against the Ghostbusters' old nemesis, Walter Peck, now Mayor of New York.

==== The Real Ghostbusters ====
Many details of Zeddemore's personality and character are revealed in episodes of The Real Ghostbusters. The episode "Cry Uncle" clarifies that, in the show's continuity, Winston has no doctorate; he also informs Egon's skeptical Uncle Cyrus that, prior to becoming a Ghostbuster, he too doubted the existence of ghosts. In "Mr. Sandman, Dream Me a Dream," Winston states that, unlike his three colleagues, he is not a scientist, causing him to doubt his ability to resolve a crisis when the Sandman traps the others within their own dreams, but with encouragement from a dream-version of Albert Einstein, he meets the challenge and wins the day. "The Ghostbusters in Paris" reveals that Winston was once a construction worker prior to joining the Ghostbusters. This idea seems to be further reinforced in the episode "The Brooklyn Triangle", when the Ghostbusters respond to a construction site headed by his father; this would indicate that it might have been a family business, until Winston decided to join the Ghostbusters.

In the episode "Devil To Pay", Zeddemore mentions having a girlfriend, though she is never seen on screen during the series. In "Night Game", he is shown to love baseball, and his favorite team is the Jaguars. In several other episodes it is shown that Zeddemore loves mystery novels and detective stories, and in "Boodunnit" he is the one who solves the mystery novel left behind by a deceased mystery writer similar to Agatha Christie, allowing her soul to rest. In "Doctor, Doctor" it is revealed that Zeddemore also likes classical literature, including the works of Herman Melville and Charles Dickens. He is also a fan of The Alan Parsons Project. "The Brooklyn Triangle" introduces Winston's father, Ed, who works in construction. Their relationship is shown to have been strained because of Winston choosing to be a Ghostbuster, but they reconcile by the end of the episode.

Finally, in the episode "The Moaning Stones", Zeddemore is revealed to be the reincarnation of Shima Buku, a shaman at war with an immortal demon known only as the Undying One.

===== Zeddemore and the Ecto-1 =====
Winston is the primary driver of Ecto-1 for more than a few moments in the two films. As a result, he is almost always shown driving the car in The Real Ghostbusters cartoon, and is often seen performing routine maintenance such as oil changes on the vehicle. In an episode of the cartoon where the Ghostbusters are sent back in time to the 1950s, Winston sees Ecto-1 in its original role as a hearse telling the other Ghostbusters he would know the vehicle anywhere, he says to the car, "Hang in there Ecto--better days are ahead for you", illustrating how fond Zeddemore is of the car. Ghostbusters: Afterlife would further this point, as Winston can be seen feeling the car in the film multiple times, examining the vehicle's condition after several years of neglect (He was heard mumbling "what happened to you?" at the car after finally defeating Gozer while also promising to restore it to its former glory). Winston later personally guides the Ecto-1 back into the recently re-acquired firehouse after he restored it in the mid-credits scene.

Ernie Hudson who played Winston Zeddemore in the original films, auditioned for the part of Winston, but was told he was doing it all wrong.

==== Extreme Ghostbusters ====
Winston only appears in the two-part series finale. After the closing down of the Ghostbusters, Winston got his pilot's license, being the first and only Ghostbuster to be a certified pilot.

==== The Super Mario Bros. Super Show ====
Ernie Hudson appears as himself in the episode "Slime Busters" of The Super Mario Bros. Super Show.

=== Video games ===
==== Ghostbusters II (NES) ====
Winston was featured as a playable character in Ghostbusters II for NES.

==== New Ghostbusters II ====
Winston was featured as a playable character in New Ghostbusters II for NES and Game Boy.

==== Ghostbusters: The Video Game ====
A likeness of Hudson, circa 1991 (the year in which the game takes place) appears in the Ghostbusters: The Video Game that was released on June 16, 2009. Hudson also reprised his role for the game by voicing him. In the game, between the Vigo Incident of '89 and Thanksgiving 1991, Winston has acquired his doctorate, is now addressed as "Doctor" along with his colleagues. Zeddemore can be heard quipping "That's Dr. Zeddemore to you, punk!" when defeating enemies. He mentions that he "pretty much lived" in the museum's exhibit on ancient Egypt while in school, revealing that his degree is in Egyptology.

On his one day off, Winston went to go see a performance of the Aida opera. However, the Psi Energy Pulse officially cancelled his plans. After Janine delivered the message, Winston left to meet up with the other Ghostbusters at the Sedgewick Hotel. He endured four hours of traffic but made it to the hotel just in time to see the Stay Puft Marshmallow Man. During their final confrontation, Ivo Shandor mocks Winston, saying that he always thought Winston was the "slow" one of the group, much to Winston's surprise. When Shandor is destroyed, everyone flees the mausoleum. Winston carries the exorcised Mayor Mulligan outside until he regains consciousness.

==== Beeline's Ghostbusters ====
Zeddemore appears in Beeline Interactive's Ghostbusters game for iOS. The game was released on January 24, 2013.

==== Lego Dimensions ====
Zeddemore appears in Lego Dimensions, with archival audio of Ernie Hudson being used to represent his character.

==== Ghostbusters: Spirits Unleashed ====
Hudson again reprised his role as Zeddemore in 2022's asymmetrical 4v1 game Ghostbusters: Spirits Unleashed created by Illfonic. The opening sequence of the game incorporates a montage showing Zeddemore guiding Ecto-1 back into the firehouse (identical to the post-credits scene of 2021's Ghostbusters: Afterlife) and returning the firehouse to working order to train a new generation of Ghostbusters. Zeddemore acts as a guide for the player-character's rookie Ghostbuster and has a role in the plot of the game alongside Dr. Ray Stantz, with Dan Aykroyd also returning to the role he originated.

== Name misspelling ==
The name "Zeddemore" is misspelled as "Zeddmore" in the closing credits of Ghostbusters. As a result it was also sometimes misspelled in scripts and other sources related to The Real Ghostbusters. The name is spelled correctly on the nametag on Winston's jumpsuit, in the shooting script of Ghostbusters (as published in the book Making Ghostbusters), and in the closing credits of Ghostbusters II. The name is also pronounced correctly (with three syllables) by both Annie Potts and Ernie Hudson in Ghostbusters.

== Bibliography ==
- Shay, Don (1985). Making Ghostbusters, New York: New York Zoetrope. ISBN 0-918432-68-5
