= Proton pack =

Fictional device from the Ghostbusters franchise

- Ghostbusters franchise element
- A replica of the proton pack used in the original film
- First appearance: Ghostbusters; 1984
- Created by: Dan Aykroyd, Harold Ramis, and Stephen Dane
- Genre: Science fiction, comedy

In-universe information
- Type: Paranormal elimination tool
- Function: Used to hold/control ghosts
- Affiliation: Ghostbusters

The proton pack is a fictional energy-based capture device, used for controlling and lassoing ghosts in the Ghostbusters universe. First depicted in the film Ghostbusters, it has a hand-held wand ("Neutrona Wand" or particle thrower) connected to a backpack-sized nuclear accelerator. It controls a stream of highly focused and radially polarized protons that electrostatically controls the negatively charged energy of a ghost, allowing it to be held in the stream.

== In the Ghostbusters universe ==
A replica of the ghost trap used in the original film

The proton pack, designed and built by Dr. Egon Spengler, is a man-portable cyclotron system (and indeed Dr. Peter Venkman refers to the proton packs in one scene as "unlicensed nuclear accelerators"), that is used to create a charged particle beam—composed of protons—that is fired by the particle thrower (also referred to as the "neutrona wand"). Described in the first movie as a "positron collider", it functions by colliding high-energy positrons to generate its proton beam. The beam allows a Ghostbuster to contain and hold "negatively charged ectoplasmic entities". This containment ability allows the wielder to position a ghost above a trap for capture. The stream is also quite destructive to physical objects, and can cause extensive property damage.

The name proton pack is not used in the original movie at all, and is not used until the subway tunnel scene in Ghostbusters II, when Egon says that they should get their proton packs. The doorman to the Mayor's mansion also uses the term proton pack, asking the Ghostbusters if he can buy one from them for his little brother. Egon replies that "A proton pack is not a toy".

In the 1984 novelization of Ghostbusters, the Proton Packs are mentioned, eg. “Stantz hauls out the formidable weaponry from the back of the Ectomobile and the four men kit themselves up, buckling on their proton packs…”

In the 2009 Ghostbusters game, Ray explains how the proton pack works early in the game; the energy emitted by the proton stream helps to dissipate psychokinetic (PK) energy which ghosts use to manifest themselves. Draining them of their PK energy weakens them, allowing them to be captured in their portable ghost traps.

According to a line spoken by Egon in Ghostbusters II, each pack's energy cell has a half-life of 5,000 years. Knobs on the main stock of the proton pack can perform various functions to customize the proton stream, including adjustments for stream intensity, length, and degrees of polarization. In the cartoon series The Real Ghostbusters, the maximum power setting for the proton packs is "500,000 MHz," which possibly refers to the rate of positron collisions occurring within the pack's accelerator system. In the cartoon the packs also have a self-destruct mechanism capable of affecting at least a half-mile radius. The Real Ghostbusters also made proton packs less efficient with power cells, allowing them to run out of energy when appropriate for dramatic tension.

For the 1997 animated spinoff Extreme Ghostbusters, the proton packs and ghost traps are redesigned to combat the threat of the malevolent Achira, an ancient disease-provoking entity accidentally released by workers constructing a new subway tunnel. Egon, with the help of Roland, Kylie and Eduardo, increased the proton packs' nuclear capability (to deal with Achira and other subsequent enemies, much stronger than what the original Ghostbusters had faced) and modified the power system; now, the packs required replaceable proton canisters to be loaded in for them to function. The trap was redesigned as well, into a gold-colored, round-shaped device with an opening hatch atop it. Kylie would typically carry it; due to this, she did not carry a normal proton pack, instead carrying a not-as-powerful proton pistol.

The IDW monthly Ghostbusters comic storyline has shown the movie pack, a boson dart capable pack and the Extreme Ghostbusters pack in use. The IDW comic also shows a proton pistol attachment to the movie pack being used by Winston while hunting down Slimer.

=== Crossing the streams ===
There's something very important I forgot to tell you! Don't cross the streams… It would be bad… Try to imagine all life as you know it stopping instantaneously and every molecule in your body exploding at the speed of light.

— Dr. Egon Spengler (Harold Ramis) on crossing proton streams

Crossing the streams was initially discouraged, as Egon believed that "total protonic reversal" would occur: this effect would have catastrophic results (see quote above) if they are crossed over three seconds. However, in a desperate effort to stop the powerful Gozer the Gozerian, Egon noted that the door to Gozer's temple "swings both ways" and that by crossing the streams, they may be able to create enough force to close the door on Gozer and its control. As the Ghostbusters cross the streams, the combination of that much energy closes the door to Gozer's dimension and severs its ties to our world. The resulting blast destroys a good portion of the roof and blows up the Stay Puft Marshmallow Man.

In Ghostbusters: The Video Game, the Ghostbusters mention that "crossing the streams" during the Gozer Incident (events of the first Ghostbusters film) only worked due to the presence of a cross-dimension portal (a tactic which is referred to as the "Gozer gambit" by Ray) and should only be used as a last resort. During the game's climax, the Ghostbusters are pulled into Ivo Shandor's ghostly realm and come face-to-face with Shandor's Destructor form, forcing them to resort to "crossing the streams" to defeat Shandor. The resulting blast not only destroys Shandor but also sends the team flying back to their dimension. During gameplay, it is possible for the player to cross the streams with another Ghostbuster, but this will only cause a burst of energy to travel down the stream and deal a massive amount of damage to the player, while also knocking them off their feet for a short time, due to a new "safety" that was installed on the neutrona wand.

In the extended version of the reboot film Ghostbusters (2016), shows that its iteration of the Ghostbusters (Abby Yates, Erin Gilbert, Jillian Holtzman, and Patty Tolan) had initially tried to close Rowan North's portal with their crossed streams before resorting to use their Ecto-1's reactor to detonate an explosion to create the total protonic reversal powerful enough to seal it.

In Ghostbusters: Afterlife, Egon built proton cannons with the parts of the proton packs and a PKE meter in Summerville, Oklahoma, to keep Gozer's portal closed with safely fired crossed streams. Later, the Ghostbusters again crossing their proton streams against Gozer to counter its energy-based powers and to weaken its physical form, allowing them to capture the deity in their 198 ghost traps.

== In Ghostbusters: The Video Game ==
The game features a modified version of the proton pack (an experimental prototype) which is given to the player (the Ghostbuster's new experimental equipment technician/guinea pig) for field testing. This new proton pack is equipped with other features (and upgrades) besides the standard proton stream.

== As props in the real world ==
The props representing proton packs were originally thought to have been made by the prop department of Columbia Pictures. Information released during the auction of a hero prop proton pack from the first film in July 2012 revealed that the hero proton packs could have been made by Boss Film Studios, a prop studio started by ILM veteran Richard Edlund.

The hero prop packs were made of molded fiberglass shells on aluminium backplates (or "motherboards") bolted to military surplus ALICE frames. The basic shape was sculpted from foam; later, a rubber mold was made of it, from which fiberglass shells were made. The electronics were quite advanced for the time. The packs have a lightbar with 15 blue scrolling lights in a box on the left-hand side and 4 red lights in the circular "cyclotron" portion of the bottom of the prop that light up in rotation. The "wand" also featured numerous light features; the most elaborate versions had fluorescent bargraphs, incandescent bulbs, and strobing flashes in the tip for the visual effects crew to synchronize the 'streams' to. They were then finished with various surplus 1960s resistors, pneumatic fittings, hoses, ribbon cable, and surplus warning labels and custom-made metal fittings, including an extending barrel mechanism. The overall weight of these props is said to be around 35 pounds (16 kg).

The proton packs used in stunt scenes were lightweight foam rubber versions made from the same mould that lacked the electronics of the hero props.

Some packs from Ghostbusters were used in the follow-up Ghostbusters II. These packs were slightly redressed, and the angle of the gun, or "wand" mount was changed to pitch forward slightly, in order to make the prop easier for the actor to use. In addition to these redressed props, one of the originals was used to make a new mold to produce lighter-weight "mid-grade" props as a solution to complaints by the actors about the weight of the original prop. These mid-grade pieces featured many details cast in as part of the mold, instead of separate fittings. The electronics and mechanisms were also cut down greatly, reducing the total weight. The original GB1 props would appear in close-ups, the mid-grade in other scenes, and new rubber "stunt" packs were made for whenever the actor needed to take a fall.

The proton pack props from the Ghostbusters movies are some of the most wanted and collectible props ever made. Several GB2 packs have surfaced for auction. In September 2004, one rubber stunt and one fiberglass midgrade prop were auctioned by Profiles in History. The midgrade prop fetched well over $13,000.

All three variations of the GB2 pack have been displayed at various Planet Hollywood restaurants around the U.S.

Toy proton packs were formerly made by Kenner as part of the Real Ghostbusters toy line. They consisted of a plastic hollow pack and gun, with a yellow foam cylinder attached to the front of the gun to represent the beam.

In late 2021, Hasbro announced a 1:1 scale replica of Spengler's Proton Pack as a Haslab crowdfunding campaign, with preorders opening in late October 2021. The project was successfully backed by the deadline and was put into production, with the first shipping in January 2023.
