= List of Ghostbusters characters =

The Ghostbusters franchise spans multiple films, animated series, novelizations, comic books, and video games. Beginning with the 1984 live-action film Ghostbusters, directed by Ivan Reitman, and written by Dan Aykroyd and Harold Ramis, the premise and storyline have inspired sequels, spinoffs, and reboots. These entries into the franchise include an ever-expanding list of both recurring and original characters.

== Overview ==
List indicators

This section includes characters who will appear or have appeared in multiple installments in the franchise.

- An empty grey cell indicates the character was not in the film, or that the character's official presence has not yet been confirmed.
- ^{A} indicates an appearance through archival footage or audio.
- ^{C} indicates a cameo role.
- ^{U} indicates an uncredited appearance.
- ^{V} indicates a voice-only role.
- ^{M} indicates a model with the actor or actress's likeness served as a body double.
- ^{L} indicates the actor or actress lent only their likeness for the film.

Character	Original film series				Animated series		Video games			Reboot
Character	Ghostbusters	Ghostbusters II	Ghostbusters: Afterlife	Ghostbusters: Frozen Empire	The Real Ghostbusters	Extreme Ghostbusters	Ghostbusters: The Video Game	Ghostbusters: Spirits Unleashed	Ghostbusters: Rise of the Ghost Lord	Ghostbusters: Answer the Call
Character	1984	1989	2021	2024	1986–1991	1997	2009	2022	2023	2016
=== Primary cast ===
Dr. Peter Venkman	Bill Murray	Bill Murray	Bill Murray	Bill Murray	Lorenzo Music^{V} Dave Coulier^{V}	Dave Coulier^{V}	Bill Murray^{V}			
Dr. Raymond "Ray" Stantz	Dan Aykroyd	Dan Aykroyd	Dan Aykroyd	Dan Aykroyd	Frank Welker^{V}	Frank Welker^{V}	Dan Aykroyd^{V}	Dan Aykroyd^{V}	Dan Aykroyd^{V}	
Dr. Egon Spengler	Harold Ramis	Harold Ramis	Harold Ramis^{L} Bob Gunton^{M} Ivan Reitman^{M}	Harold Ramis^{A}	Maurice LaMarche^{V}	Maurice LaMarche^{V}	Harold Ramis^{V}			Bronze head bust
Dr. Winston Zeddemore	Ernie Hudson	Ernie Hudson	Ernie Hudson	Ernie Hudson	Arsenio Hall^{V} Buster Jones^{V}	Buster Jones^{V}	Ernie Hudson^{V}	Ernie Hudson^{V}		
Janine Melnitz	Annie Potts	Annie Potts	Annie Potts	Annie Potts	Laura Summer^{V} Kath Soucie^{V}	Pat Musick^{V}	Annie Potts^{V}			
Dana Barrett-Venkman	Sigourney Weaver	Sigourney Weaver	Sigourney Weaver^{C}							
Phoebe Spengler			Mckenna Grace	Mckenna Grace						
Trevor Spengler			Finn Wolfhard	Finn Wolfhard						
Podcast			Logan Kim	Logan Kim					Appeared	
Lucky Domingo			Celeste O'Connor	Celeste O'Connor					Appeared	
Callie Spengler			Carrie Coon	Carrie Coon						
Gary Grooberson			Paul Rudd	Paul Rudd						
=== Supporting cast ===
Slimer	Ivan Reitman^{V}	Ivan Reitman^{V}		Appeared	Frank Welker^{V}	Billy West^{V}	Ivan Reitman^{V}	Appeared	Appeared	Adam Ray^{V}
Louis Tully	Rick Moranis	Rick Moranis			Roger Bumpass^{V}					
Mayor Lenny Clotch	David Margulies	David Margulies			Aron Kincaid^{V} Frank Welker^{V} Neil Ross^{V} Hal Smith^{V}					
Walter Peck	William Atherton			William Atherton	Robert Towers^{V}		William Atherton^{V}			
Stay Puft Marshmallow Man The Destructor	Bill Bryan		Ira Heiden^{V} Sarah Natochenny^{V} Shelby Young^{V}	Shelby Young^{V}	Frank Welker^{V} John Stocker^{V}		Appeared		Appeared	Parade balloon
Zuul The Gatekeeper	Sigourney Weaver Ivan Reitman^{V}		Carrie Coon Celeste O'Connor Ivan Reitman^{V}							
Vinz Clortho The Keymaster	Rick Moranis		Paul Rudd							
Gozer the Gozerian	Slavitza Jovan Paddi Edwards^{V}		Olivia Wilde^{U} Emma Portner^{M} Shohreh Aghdashloo^{V}							
Eleanor Twitty	Ruth Oliver			Appeared			Appeared			
Roger Delacorte	John Rothman			John Rothman						
Mooglie Ghostbusters Logo	Appeared	Appeared	Appeared	Appeared	Frank Welker^{V} Arsenio Hall^{V}	Appeared	Appeared	Appeared	Appeared	Neil Casey (Note: Neil Casey portrays Rowan North, an occultist and supernatural enthusiast who takes the form of Mooglie as a ghost.)
Vigo the Carpathian		Wilhelm von Homburg Max von Sydow^{U}^{V} Howie Weed Dan Aykroyd			Painting		Max von Sydow^{V}		Painting	
Ivo Shandor			J. K. Simmons^{C}				Brian Doyle-Murray^{V}			
Bug-Eye Ghost			Appeared		Frank Welker^{V}			Appeared		
Muncher			Josh Gad^{V}					Appeared		
Garraka				Gil Kenan^{V}				Appeared	Appeared	
Lars Pinfield				James Acaster					Appeared	
Samhain					Bill Martin	Appeared		Ryan Colt Levy		

== Ghostbusters (1984) ==
=== Human characters ===
==== Peter Venkman ====
Peter Venkman is a focal member of the Ghostbusters. He is portrayed by Bill Murray in all four main series movies, and is voiced in the animated series by Lorenzo Music and subsequently Dave Coulier who would later reprise his role in a cameo in Extreme Ghostbusters. Peter is one of three doctors of parapsychology on the team; he also holds a PhD in psychology. In the movies, although he is the leader, he is characterized by his blunt persona, laid-back approach to his profession, and his womanizing demeanor; of the three doctors in the Ghostbusters, he is the least committed to the academic and scientific side of their profession, and tends to regard his field, in the words of his employer in the first film, as "a dodge or hustle". In the first movie, he is shown to develop genuine concern and romantic feelings for the Ghostbusters' first client, Dana Barrett (Sigourney Weaver).

==== Raymond Stantz ====
Raymond "Ray" Stantz, another member of the Ghostbusters, is played by Dan Aykroyd in all four main series movies. He was voiced by Frank Welker in the animated television series The Real Ghostbusters and he reprised his role in a cameo in Extreme Ghostbusters. He is one of the three doctors of parapsychology on the team, and Peter's closest friend. Ray is considered the "heart" of the Ghostbusters by the other members of the team, and the second in command. He is an expert on paranormal history and metallurgy. Ray is characterized by his almost childlike enthusiasm towards his work, and his outspoken acceptance of paranormal activity.

==== Egon Spengler ====
Egon Spengler is the brains of the Ghostbusters – described in the original script as a "New Wave Mr. Spock" – and the creator of the Ghostbusters' equipment along with Raymond Stantz. Lacking much of a personality other than his focus on all things scientific, he is often shown as lacking social skills when dealing with people. Egon was portrayed by Harold Ramis in the films Ghostbusters and Ghostbusters II, voiced by Maurice LaMarche in the animated television series The Real Ghostbusters and Extreme Ghostbusters, and Ramis' likeness was used for the character in Ghostbusters: Afterlife, with Bob Gunton and Ivan Reitman acting as stand-ins for the late Ramis. LaMarche was the only voice actor to remain for the entirety of both series. Before the original movie was released, American Cinematographer described Egon as "maniacal" based on reading the script. Ramis credited the part as launching his acting career, as up to that point he had been a director and writer, despite having co-starred alongside Bill Murray in Stripes.

In Ghostbusters: Afterlife, Egon is revealed to have had a daughter, Callie, prior to 1984, whom he is estranged from. Egon came to believe that the apocalypse would come. His continued research came at the cost of his relationships with his fellow Ghostbusters, who disbelieved Egon's assertions. This culminated in Egon stealing Ecto-1 and a large amount of equipment and moving to Summerville, Oklahoma, where he learned of Shandor's secondary Gozerian temple and Gozer's impending return. Egon rigged a proton barrier to contain the ghosts within the Shandor Mines while capturing one of Gozer's minions to force Gozer into a trap he set up. The trap failed, and Egon hid the captured ghost within his house. Egon is killed by the other entity, his death ruled as a heart attack.

Callie moved to Summerville to take possession of Egon's house. Phoebe, Callie's daughter and Egon's granddaughter who shares a similar passion for science with her late grandfather, discovered the trap containing Gozer's minion, which is released the following day by Gary Grooberson, and Egon's spirit guided her to his underground workshop, where he helped her fix a damaged proton pack. He also helped Trevor fix the dilapidated Ecto-1, and guided Callie into realising that, far from being a deadbeat, Egon had always watched over her.

During the final battle with Gozer, Egon materialised as a ghost in order to aid Phoebe and his old Ghostbuster colleagues in trapping Gozer permanently. He reconciled with his friends and family before passing peacefully into the afterlife.

==== Winston Zeddemore ====
Winston Zeddemore is played by Ernie Hudson in all four main series movies and the 2009 video game, and was voiced by Arsenio Hall in the first three seasons of The Real Ghostbusters. Buster Jones provided Winston's voice in the remaining seasons, and he reprised the role in a cameo on Extreme Ghostbusters. Hudson reportedly auditioned to reprise the role of Winston for the animated series, but he was rejected in favor of Hall. Unlike the other members of the team, Winston is not a scientist with a background in the paranormal; the novelization says that he was in the Marines. He is hired when the Ghostbusters' business begins to pick up. Despite not sharing the educational credentials of his coworkers, Winston often serves as the everyman of the team, acting as a voice of reason and displaying more common sense than the others. In the 2009 video game, Winston claims to have spent time in the Egyptian exhibit of the museum while in graduate school working on his doctorate, suggesting experience in anthropology or a related science, and addressing himself as a doctor, indicates that he has his own PhD.

The post-credits scene in Ghostbusters: Afterlife reveals that Winston's post-Ghostbusters career was highly lucrative as he built several businesses from the ground up. In his discussion with Janine Melnitz, though, he reveals that nothing fulfilled him like being with the original Ghostbusters, which is why he has secretly been financing Ray Stantz's occult business. He vows to expand the support to the new crew as they continue Egon's work.

==== Dana Barrett ====
Portrayed by Sigourney Weaver, Dana Barrett was a cellist living at 550 Central Park West (55 Central Park West), a haunted apartment building which would become the gateway for the apocalyptic deity Gozer the Gozerian. Dana's living quarters is located where the entrance to the building's Gozerian temple is hidden, referred later to by Ray Stantz as the "Spook Central." She is singled out early for unwelcome paranormal attention by Gozer's minions, and seeks the help of the Ghostbusters after seeing their advertisement on television. She is possessed by the demon Zuul, Gatekeeper of Gozer, who, along with Keymaster Vinz Clortho, opens the interdimensional gate to summon Gozer to Earth in the first film. She promptly attracts the romantic attention of Peter, whose flippant behavior causes her to doubt her decision to seek aid from the Ghostbusters. In the sequel five years later, Dana is a divorced mother of an eight-month-old boy named Oscar; Peter is neither her former husband nor Oscar's father. Dana was then working as a restorationist for the fictitious Manhattan Museum of Art. It is here that she (and later Baby Oscar) come to the attention of the evil Prince Vigo the Carpathian, whose malevolent spirit inhabits his massive self portrait. When Dana and Baby Oscar become the target of Vigo's plot, the Ghostbusters re-enter her life to save her, Baby Oscar, and the world once again.

Dana was also a neighbor of Louis Tully at 550 Central Park West in the first movie. The two remained acquainted, then became friends. Louis and Janine Melnitz baby-sat Oscar (and themselves became a romantic item) during the second film. Dana appears in the mid-credits scene of Ghostbusters: Afterlife (2021), in which she and Peter are revealed to be married and settled in Cortland, and play with the cards Peter used to discover his students' psychic potential. Peter is hooked up to the "shock" machine, in which Dana is having pleasure by tormenting her husband with it. She is not seen or mentioned in Ghostbusters: Frozen Empire, but a poster is glimpsed that advertises a concert by "Cellist Dana Barrett". Dana is the only character that didn't appear in The Real Ghostbusters and Ghostbusters: The Video Game.

==== Janine Melnitz ====
Janine Melnitz, the Ghostbusters's secretary, is played by Annie Potts in both movies, and is voiced by Laura Summer and Kath Soucie in The Real Ghostbusters and Pat Musick in Extreme Ghostbusters. Janine has occasionally worn the Ghostbusters uniform and used ghost-catching equipment in the animated series. During the first film, and in both animated series, Janine often flirted with Egon but he remained oblivious. She dated Louis Tully in the sequel.

In Ghostbusters: Afterlife, Janine contacted Callie Spengler to inform her of Egon's death and to arrange for Callie to collect Egon's belongings. She informed Callie that Egon had accrued a large amount of debt. In the post-credits scene, she and Winston discuss the latter's success.

==== Louis Tully ====
Louis Tully is a nerdy accountant as well as a tax attorney and a neighbor of Dana Barrett, played by Rick Moranis in Ghostbusters and Ghostbusters II and voiced by Rodger Bumpass in the Slimer! And the Real Ghostbusters animated series. He is possessed by the demon Vinz Clortho, the Keymaster who, along with Zuul, opens the interdimensional gate to bring Gozer to Earth in the first film. In Ghostbusters II, he is revealed to have graduated from night law school, in which he implies that it was an inadequate educational institution, and, in the novelization, revealed that it was called Famous Lawyer's School & Dry-Cleaning Emporium. Due to his limited trainings in laws, he mostly handles matters relating to taxes and probate. He represents the Ghostbusters at their trial in his first court case.

In the film's deleted scenes, revealed that he has a cousin, Sherman Tully (played by Eugene Levy), a dermatologist on staff at the Parkview Psychiatric Hospital. Louis then takes up permanent employment with the Ghostbusters when they reestablish their business. In addition, Louis seeks to become the fifth Ghostbuster. At one point, he borrows a Ghostbuster jumpsuit and proton pack to attempt to help defeat Vigo the Carpathian. After the release of Ghostbusters II, Louis became a semi-regular character on Slimer! And the Real Ghostbusters as the Ghostbusters' legal and financial advisor. Ghostbusters, like many films on which Moranis has worked, had him improvising some of his lines.

Louis is a playable character in New Ghostbusters II for the NES. He appears as a non-playable character in Lego Dimensions voiced by Mick Wingert. In his side quest on the Ghostbusters Adventure World, he requires the player's help to get more guests for his party. Although Louis did not appear in Ghostbusters: The Video Game, it is obvious that he was the "other guy" that Peter referred to who tried to be a fifth Ghostbuster. Louis is still employed by the Ghostbusters, but he left a note on his desk saying that he is "feeling sick, going home early", explaining his absence (due to Moranis declining to reprise his role for the game) and it is filled with piles of paperwork needing to be finished. His own Ghostbuster uniform (with his name on it) hangs behind it as well, implying that he may have officially been a member. Louis is also tasked to scout locations to expand the team's operations beyond New York City.

Though the character did not appear in the 2021 sequel Ghostbusters: Afterlife, old aura scans of Louis taken from when he was possessed by Vinz Clortho are in Egon's storm-cellar laboratory, acknowledging Moranis's past involvements to the franchise.

==== Lenny Clotch ====
Leonard "Lenny" Clotch is the mayor of New York City. He was played by David Margulies in the films Ghostbusters and Ghostbusters II, and by Frank Welker in the animated series The Real Ghostbusters. Though skeptical of the Ghostbusters due to his Catholic background (in reality, Margulies was Jewish), Clotch is apparently open-minded on the paranormal and thus quietly and reluctantly supports them when facing supernatural crisis. By 1989, Clotch is running for governor, and is assisted by Jack Hardemeyer until Clotch fires him for misconduct; he later rehires him. During the supernatural chaos "Vigo Incident of '89", Clotch meets the ghost of deceased mayor Fiorello La Guardia, which was an unpleasant experience for him. By 1991, in Ghostbusters: The Video Game, he is succeeded by Jock Mulligan as mayor implying he has become governor. Decades later, in Ghostbusters: Frozen Empire, they are succeeded by Walter Peck.

==== Walter Peck ====
Walter Peck is a cynical and over-zealous inspector for the Environmental Protection Agency (EPA), for the third district in the greater New York area, played by William Atherton. Spurred on by "wild stories in the media," Peck is sent to "assess any possible environmental impact" by the Ghostbusters' operation. Peter Venkman instantly dislikes Peck and refuses him access to inspect the premises, in particular the Containment Unit ghost-storage facility. This confrontation leads to Peck getting official inspection orders and eventually having the Containment Unit shut off. The result is catastrophic, unleashing all the entities that were trapped, powering Ivo Shandor's tower at 550 Central Park West (55 Central Park West), and providing the 'sign' that Terror Dogs Keymaster and Gatekeeper of Gozer, Vinz Clortho and Zuul (possessing Louis Tully and Dana Barrett, respectively) were waiting for. Peck again confronts the Ghostbusters and orders them arrested, refusing to take responsibility and blaming them for the explosion at the firehouse. This provokes Egon Spengler's furious attempt to assault Peck, and Venkman and Ray Stantz display contempt for Peck's harassment.

As the Manhattan Crossrip of 1984 begins, the Ghostbusters are released from jail and brought to City Hall. There they square off against Peck, trying to convince the mayor that not just the city, but the world, is in danger. Peck's belief that the Ghostbusters were drugging the city with hallucinogens is invalidated by the authorities and experts. Evidence supporting the Ghostbusters' innocence is brought forth, humiliating Peck since he has nothing to support his claims. The mayor sides with the Ghostbusters and has a furious Peck removed from his office. With the mayor's support, the Ghostbusters gear up and head off with a police / military escort towards their confrontation with Gozer the Gozerian. Peck also heads up to 550 Central Park West and bears witness to Gozer manifesting in Its Stay-Puft Marshmallow Man Destructor form. He eventually gets engulfed in Mr. Stay-Puft's melted remains, leaving him publicly humiliated.

Despite this, later, in Ghostbusters II, people like Peck from nearly "every state, county, and city agency" in the New York area sued the Ghostbusters and put them out of business for five years. This caused them to loathe short-sighted, selfish bureaucrats, exemplified by their interactions with the mayor's assistant Jack Hardemeyer and Judge Stephen Wexler.

Walter Peck appears only once in The Real Ghostbusters animated series, in the episode "Big Trouble with Little Slimer," voiced by Robert Towers. Having been fired from the EPA, Peck has become a member of the government organization BUFO (Bureau of Unidentified Flying Organisms). Dead set for revenge, Peck became determined to prove that the Ghostbusters were frauds and end their business. His first attempt involved making a false call to try to arrest the Ghostbusters on trespassing warrants, though it backfires on him when it's discovered that the compound actually was haunted by a ghost. His next attempt involved taking Slimer away from them. Not believing him to be a real ghost, Peck had Slimer classified as a U.F.O, and pressed charges against the Ghostbusters should they refuse to hand him over. Peck then placed Slimer in a cyclotron machine in an attempt to destroy him, and changed the codes to prevent Slimer being rescued. However, the machine was not designed for long-term use. When Peck forgot the code, the Ghostbusters had to use their throwers to prevent the machine from blowing up the building. The general running BUFO dressed Peck down for his reckless, dangerous, and selfish vendetta. Peck and his partner Calahan had their contracts terminated.

In Ghostbusters: The Video Game, Peck – again played by Atherton – went on to lead the PCOC (Paranormal Contracts Oversight Commission), an agency overseeing the Ghostbusters; they remain in mutual enmity; Venkman continues to refer to Peck as "Pecker" and threatens to kill him with his proton pack. For his part, Peck still firmly believes that the Ghostbusters are scam artists despite evidence to the contrary. His attempts to discredit them have become an obsession, which causes Peck more trouble when he's caught in the fight between the Ghostbusters and the spirit of Ivo Shandor. By the end of the game, he has been captured by Shandor and begs the Ghostbusters to free him from his captivity. The Ghostbusters' recruit does so, but simply by severing his bonds with a proton stream and letting Peck fall on the ground. As a result, he angrily leaves, again blaming the Ghostbusters and telling them they have not seen the last of him.

Walter Peck returns in Ghostbusters: Frozen Empire as mayor of New York and Peck still has a vendetta against the Ghostbusters and again scapegoating them for the city's renewed supernatural activities. In the end, despite Peck threatening to put them out of business for good, they maneuver him into supporting the team and reinstating Phoebe to avoid ruining his reputation, once again leading to another defeat for him, albeit not as humiliating as his previous one.

=== Supernatural entities ===
==== Slimer ====
Slimer is a translucent green blob creature, with two skinny arms, no feet, and several chins. In the first movie, Slimer was voiced by director Reitman, while Frank Welker voiced the green ghost in The Real Ghostbusters. In the 1989 sequel Ghostbusters II, Robin Shelby performed Slimer and Reitman again voiced Slimer but most of the footage shot was not used. In the late 1990s cartoon Extreme Ghostbusters, Slimer's voice was provided by Billy West. Troy Baker voices Slimer in the 2009 video game, though with the sound effects used in the first movie. Aykroyd reportedly referred to Slimer as "The Ghost of John Belushi".

In the script for Ghostbusters, Slimer is never called by any name. He is described by Dr. Ray Stantz (Dan Aykroyd) as an "Ugly Little Spud," just before he slimes Dr. Peter Venkman (Bill Murray). In Ghostbusters terminology, Slimer is designated as a "Focused, Non-Terminal Repeating Phantasm or a Class 5 Full-Roaming Vapor" (Class 5 manifestations are fully developed entities that lacked human forms). The creature's original title was "The Onionhead Ghost", which the film crew dubbed him for the horrible odor he used to scare a couple in a scene cut from the original movie. Slimer's personality is one of tremendous gluttony, and he is referred to as a "disgusting blob". In the movies, he is not named and makes short appearances. In the cartoon, he is known as Slimer, is able to speak, and demonstrates a child's intelligence and intense loyalty to Peter and the Ghostbusters with the personality of a dog. His role in the series is explained in the episode "Citizen Ghost", which primarily consists of a flashback to the immediate aftermath of the movie, where Slimer returned to the firehouse as the Ghostbusters were the first people to show any interest in him, the team "adopting" him as a means of testing ghosts and an ally after he helped them defeat ectoplasmic manifestations of themselves that had manifested from their old uniforms after the uniforms were exposed to ghostly energies from the containment unit. In the Marvel UK comics of the Real Ghostbusters, Slimer had his own half-page sketch, in which Slimer's past life was covered; he was originally called King Remils ("Slimer" spelled backwards), a greedy, obese monarch who had died of heart failure.

Slimer's popularity soared from the subsequent spin-off animated television series The Real Ghostbusters. Slimer later starred in his own Slimer! cartoons when The Real Ghostbusters was extended to a one-hour format. SLIMER! was briefly published by NOW Comics, a defunct Chicago firm. Artists included Mitch O'Connell and Mark Braun. Writers included Larry Parr who also wrote for the animated series. Slimer also appeared as a representative of The Real Ghostbusters in the animated anti-drug television special Cartoon All-Stars to the Rescue. Slimer was also the mascot for the Hi-C flavor "Ecto Cooler", which came out shortly after The Real Ghostbusters, and was colored green. Slimer remained on the box well after the Real Ghostbusters was cancelled; but in 1997 the drink was renamed "Shoutin' Orange Tangergreen", and Slimer was removed. Slimer also had a toothpaste named after him. A more monstrous and "evil-looking" incarnation of Slimer appears in the 2016 reboot, as voiced by Adam Ray: it appears in the ghost havoc scenes, as it ravages a hot dog cart, but, as the Ghostbusters near to investigate, he steals the Ecto-1 and starts joyriding with other ghosts (including a Lady Slimer) around Manhattan, but the Ghostbusters decide not to shoot him, as the car contains a nuclear reactor. Later, they actually do shoot at the car to use the reactor to reverse the effects of the ghost portal, with Slimer and Lady Slimer sharing a kiss before falling inside it.

==== Stay-Puft Marshmallow Man ====
The Stay-Puft Marshmallow Man – mascot for the fictional Stay-Puft Marshmallows company – became the chosen Destructor form of Gozer (towering roughly 112.5" feet tall) after Dr. Ray Stantz "tried to think of the most harmless thing, something he loved from childhood and that could never, ever possibly destroy them." Stay-Puft also makes appearances in the animated series The Real Ghostbusters (most times friendly due to not being possessed by Gozer any longer, other times a bit cranky), and returns as a boss – the resurrected Destructor avatar sans Gozer – in Ghostbusters: The Video Game. Stay-Puft was inspired by Peter O'Boyle, a security guard at Columbia Pictures whom director Reitman met filming his previous movie, Spacehunter: Adventures in the Forbidden Zone. According to Sam Delaney of The Guardian, "Stay-Puft's familiar mascot combined elements of real life brand ambassadors Bibendum (aka the Michelin tire man) and the Pillsbury Dough Boy." The costume was created by Bill Bryan using miniatures, optical compositing and Bryan himself in a latex suit. In the 2021 film Ghostbusters: Afterlife, Gozer creates Mini-Pufts as minions out of Stay-Puft Marshmallows as distractions.

==== Gozer the Gozerian ====
Gozer the Gozerian is a Class 7 Deity of Destruction revered by the Hittite, Mesopotamian and Sumerian cultures who appears as the first film's main antagonist, known by many titles that include "The Destructor", "The Destroyer", "Volguus Zildrohar, Lord of The Sebouillia", "Scourge of the Glethestements" and "The Traveler." Its base form is that of an androgynous woman, leading to it typically being identified as female. Gozer's appearance is preceded by increased paranormal activity and the disruption of natural forces. As briefly mentioned in the film and fully covered by the 2009 game sequel, Gozer had a following on Earth around 6000 BC before being banished by the Babylonian goddess Tiamat following a protracted conflict between their followers. Via its chief minions – Terror Dogs Zuul the Gatekeeper and Vinz Clortho the Keymaster, Gozer can enter into another reality and offers those witness to its arrival to choose an avatar form known as a Destructor before proceeding to destroy that plane of existence, as it did in one dimension as a Torb (electric eel-like creature) and in another, a Sloar (reptilian humanoid that produces venomous ectoplasmic substance that conducts psychomagnotheric energy).

In the 1920s, cult leader Ivo Shandor and his followers set up Gozer's coming to Earth while predicting the years during which a cross-dimensional rip would occur. Such a rip occurred years after Shandor's death as the "Manhattan Crossrip of 1984", when Zuul and Vinz Clortho opened the portal for their master to emerge from the rooftop temple of 550 Central Park West (55 Central Park West). Being confronted by the Ghostbusters upon arrival, Gozer uses Ray Stantz's accidental thought to assume its Destructor form of the Stay-Puft Marshmallow Man before being banished back to its realm when the Ghostbusters fired their crossed proton streams on the gateway. Prior to it being banished, Peter Venkman mockingly nicknamed Gozer "flat top", "chick", and "prehistoric bitch" after its first attack. Thirty-seven years later, in Summerville, Oklahoma, it is revealed that Winston Zeddemore himself referred to Gozer as "muffin" out of his own scorn toward it.

Gozer "reappears" in the 2009 game via the Gozerian Mandala-revived form of Mr. Stay Puft, but was easily defeated since lacking a portal to Gozer's domain made it comparatively weaker than its initial manifestation along with its fixed manifestation as Stay Puft within Earth preventing Gozer from assuming more effective avatar forms and the fact the Ghostbusters upgraded their arsenal since their first encounter. Stay-Puft's defeat convinces a disillusioned Ivo Shandor to alter his plans while forsaking his faith in Gozer.

Gozer returns in the 2021 sequel, Ghostbusters: Afterlife, as the main antagonist. In the film, Egon learned of Gozer's eventual return in 2021 and moved to Summerville, Oklahoma, where the selenium used to construct 550 Central Park West (the structure used to summon Gozer) was mined from, to prepare a series of traps to stop Gozer permanently. Egon lured the disembodied Gozer to his farm after capturing one of its minions and preventing ghosts from flooding into Summerville, but the gambit failed, and Egon hid the ghost trap holding the creature. Egon is then attacked by the other creature, causing him to suffer a fatal heart attack. When the creature inside the trap was freed, it returned to Shandor's mine. Vinz Clortho and Zuul picked new hosts and return to the Gozerian temple, and Gozer was brought back to Earth in a form similar to its previous, but includes skeletal protrusions and spikes, with energy surging throughout its body (due to Jason Reitman's desire to use prosthetic like Alien film series' that starred Sigourney Weaver instead of a form-fitting costume like the first film's and of different actresses as the character both physically and disembodied, and with Gozer being a shape-shifter, explaining the differences in appearance). This time, Gozer does not assume a Destructor Form when facing the Ghostbusters. However, it animates Stay-Puft Marshmallows as Mini-Pufts as minions. Egon's grandchildren, Phoebe and Trevor, re-enact Egon's plan to lure Gozer to the farm by capturing Zuul in a ghost trap to render it incorporeal, though the trap once again fails and Zuul is released with Gozer's physical form restored. It is confronted once again by the original Ghostbusters, including the ghost of Egon, who help snare Gozer while Phoebe battles the entity and Trevor fires a proton beam to power the trap. Gozer and its minions are again defeated by the Ghostbusters, trapped inside ghost traps buried underneath the farm, and its threat is neutralized. However, after Gozer and its minions are deposited into the firehouse's ecto-containment unit, a warning light blinks.

In Ghostbusters: Frozen Empire, Gozer is referred by Janine Menitz after the Ghostbusters defeated another evil deity Garraka.

In Ghostbusters terminology from West End Games' role-playing game, Gozer would be a Class 7 Metaspectre. Gozer never appeared in The Real Ghostbusters animated series or receive a classification, but is referenced by Ray as a "Primal God" in the episode, "Janine Melnitz, Ghostbuster". Gozer was also used as a benchmark for other potent entities encountered, such as Proteus, Nexxa, Murray The Mantis and Great Cthulhu. Gozer was originally played by Yugoslav actress/model Slavitza Jovan and its demonic voice was provided by Paddi Edwards in the 1984 film. In the 2021 film, Gozer was portrayed by Emma Portner and an uncredited Olivia Wilde while voiced by Shohreh Aghdashloo.

==== Terror Dogs: Zuul the Gatekeeper and Vinz Clortho the Keymaster ====
Zuul and Vinz Clortho are the primary servants and harbingers of Gozer the Gozerian, their true forms being bipedal demons before manifesting in the physical world as horned quadruped hounds. Though they look similar, Vinz's primary horns are twice as long as Zuul's. A pair of fully corporeal possessors, Zuul and Vinz seek out a mortal female and male to inhabit and turn them into The Gatekeeper and The Keymaster, respectively, for a sexual rite to open a portal for their master to manifest through. In Ghostbusters terminology from West End Games' role-playing game, The Terror Dogs would each rank as a Class 7 Metaspectre, and in Erik Burnham's Tobin's Spirit Guide: Official Ghostbusters Edition, they are designated as a Class 7 Fully Corporeal Possessors. In addition to their ability to dematerialize and possess mortals, The Terror Dogs exhibit other supernatural powers such as summoning lesser entities, levitating, telekinesis and shape-changing (usually the physical form of those they possess into their own horrific forms).

Prior to the "Manhattan Crossrip of 1984", manifesting through twin gargoyles atop 550 Central Park West (55 Central Park West), Zuul and Vinz possess Dana Barrett (Sigourney Weaver) and Louis Tully (Rick Moranis) respectively to summon Gozer. In the end, they are forced back to their dimension by the Ghostbusters. While not necessarily the origin of the word "Zuul," there is a similarity with the ancient Maya word for dog, "tzul".

Zuul's name was referred to by Patty Tolan in the remake of the original film Ghostbusters (2016) after hearing strange recordings, implying that the setting of this film is a parallel universe to the original film and its sequels', and that Gozer is going to attack their universe, making the film possibly canonical to the original film series, though these were never explored further onscreen.

Zuul and Vinz Clortho reappear in Ghostbusters: Afterlife. In the film, in addition to being minions and emissaries of Gozer, they serve as sentinels to stand and keep watch the temples devoted to their master including the one in Shandor's mine at Summerville. Because of this, for 27 years, they have been clashing with Egon Spengler after he arrived to prevent Gozer from returning. Egon captured one of them in an attempt to trap Gozer, but his plan failed and he hid the ghost trap underneath the floor boards of his house prior to being attacked by the other creature and suffering a fatal heart attack. After Egon's estranged daughter, Callie, moves to Summerville to inherit his farm, her daughter Phoebe uncovers the trap and unintentionally freed the creature inside with help from Gary Grooberson, and it returns to the Shandorian mine. Vinz Clortho chooses to possess Gary, while Zuul possesses Callie, and the two unite in the Gozerian temple in the Shandor mines to summon Gozer. Phoebe and Trevor attempt to enact Egon's plan to trap Gozer by trapping Zuul inside a ghost trap with Gozer and Vinz pursuing them to the farm. But the trap fails a second time and Gozer frees Zuul, who possesses Lucky before she is trapped for good, alongside Vinz Clortho and Gozer, after the original Ghostbusters appear to aid, and Trevor fires a proton beam to power the trap.

==== The Grey Lady ====
Doctor Eleanor Twitty alias The Grey Lady or "The Library Ghost", portrayed by Ruth Hale Oliver, is a lady in grey and the first ghost encountered by the original three Ghostbusters (Ray, Egon and Peter) while they are investigating paranormal activity at the New York Public Library. When they attempt to touch her, she transforms into a much larger and more frightening skeletal form and causes the trio to flee the library in terror. Though they do not catch her, they get a scan of her and use the information to construct their containment grid and ghost-catching equipment, allowing the creation of their ghost-catching business. In Ghostbusters terminology from West End Games' role-playing game, The Grey Lady would be a Class 4 Free-Floating, Full-Torso, Vaporous Apparition, as she was human in appearance and later identified by the Ghostbusters. In Ghostbusters: The Video Game (2009), she is designated as a Class 4 Semi-Anchored Entity.

She returns in the 2009 video game, where much of her history is revealed, and the Ghostbusters uncover the tragic story of her death. She was once Dr. Eleanor Twitty, the New York Public Library's head librarian in the 1920s, and overseer of its Special Collections of ancient artifacts, stone tablets, long-forgotten tomes, and rare books. She was murdered in 1924 by philologist and oil tycoon Edmund Hoover, The Collector, a disciple of Ivo Shandor who seduced her for the Gozerian Codex among other rare books in her care. She is memorialized by the library as a dedicated staffmember who died protecting its properties. However, since Twitty's death, other librarians sense her haunting presence, eventually frightening one staff, Alice Melvin (Alice Drummond), in 1984. In the video game, the Ghostbusters discover her reading the Codex in the library's secret catacombs where she died before capturing her. Due to the ease of the capture, they state that she must have wanted them to recover the Codex to aid them in defeating Hoover after he died and became the guardian of the mandala node Shandor built into the library. Offscreen, she is later freed after the spirits of the Cult of Gozer attack the Ghostbusters' firehouse headquarters for the spiritual energy from their ecto-containment unit.

In the film Ghostbusters: Frozen Empire (2024), The Library Ghost makes a cameo appearance in the library, in both her Grey Lady form as well as her transformed skeletal form that still frightens Ray Stantz. Oliver returned as the Library Ghost in human form via the archived footage from the first film, but new puppet was made for her skeletal form.

==== Dream Ghost ====
According to Tobin's Spirit Guide, dream ghosts are Class 4 benign entities that only manifest in the presence of a sleeping individual. Ray encountered with such a spirit in his sleep, who was portrayed by late Playboy centerfold Kymberly Herrin. In omitted scenes, she was originally a ghost who haunts Fort Detmerring guardhouse. It is believed that when alive she was a sweetheart of a military officer who stationed there over a hundred years ago. In the IDW Publishing's Ghostbusters comic book series, she has a reference in Ghostbusters Annual 2017 in the Dramatis Personae Pages on Ray's biography with the line "In love with a ghost (but not the one from Fort Detmerring)."

==== Ivo Shandor ====
Ivo Shandor, a surgeon and an architect of some renown during the early 20th century, was born in Romania around 1859. He moved to New York City from Bucharest in 1898. Shandor’s achievements set in motion the plot of the original film, and he appears as the "boss" of the 2009 video game. He is played by actors Brian Doyle-Murray in the game and J.K. Simmons in the 2021 film Ghostbusters: Afterlife. He is a relative of Wolf Van Shandor, a famous artist who made mythology-inspired artworks. His architectural style includes elements of Federalism, Art Deco, and (Mesopotamian). Shandor is obsessed with mythologies, having extensive knowledge of the occult and of science that rivals Egon Spengler and Ray Stantz. Insane with a God complex, he deemed that humanity is beyond redemption after the First World War. He established the Cult of Gozer, comprising nearly a thousand followers. The cult was based on his family's island home on the Hudson River, where he mass-produced ectoplasm. John Horace Tobin, author of several reference books, infiltrated Shandor's new religious movement and published his findings on their methods and history as part of Tobin's Spirit Guide.

Shandor used his connections to steel mogul and disciple Cornelius Wellesley to design 550 Central Park West (55 Central Park West) as a temple to summon Gozer, using materials from a mining operation he established along with the town of Summerville, Oklahoma in 1927. Shandor also developed a mandala across the city, with the New York Public Library, the Museum of Natural History, and the Sedgewick Hotel (built by Shandor's misanthropic follower Godfrey McCallister Sedgewick) as key nodes protected by demonic spirits who were originally his three top disciples (Edmund Hoover, Cornelius Wellesley, and Evelyn Lewis). The fourth node is located on Shandor Island (before it sank) and is guarded by a captured Sloar, a demon that produces the black slime that powers the Mandala system and flows into a series of abandoned city subway tunnels, turning New York City into a hotspot for supernatural activity. His cult experimented with time travel, attempting to find artifacts from the future that would reveal the outcomes of their apocalyptic schemes, but managed to retrieve a Ghostbusters (1984) DVD from an unknown origin (implying that the Cult of Gozer had reached a parallel universe where events of the Ghostbusters' world are fictitious) but were unable to play it because the DVD had not been invented yet. After Shandor apparently died in 1945, reputedly from complications surrounding an attempted self-surgery, his body was believed to be buried in a cult-owned mausoleum in what is currently Central Park. His resting place was desecrated, as had been those of most other New Yorkers. Apparently having no living relatives (though later revealed to have a descendant in Dr. Ilyssa Selwyn), Shandor's fortune and resources are managed by his eponymous foundation.

Shandor's original scheme comes to fruition during the events of the first film in 1984, when sufficient energy is collected to physically manifest Gozer's minions, Zuul and Vinz Clortho, in preparation for their master's coming. The Ghostbusters foil Gozer's entry and neutralize it. As revealed in the video game, Shandor is also indirectly responsible for the events of Ghostbusters II, as the psychomagnotheric "mood" slime produced on his island was discovered by the malevolent spirit of Vigo the Carpathian underneath the Manhattan Museum of Art; Vigo used Shandor's substance to strengthen himself and to pursue his own apocalyptic agenda after his cursed painting's arrival at the museum.

After decades of operating behind the scenes, Shandor finally makes an appearance in Ghostbusters: The Video Game as a main antagonist of the game. It is revealed that prior to his death he made pacts with the Gozerian pantheon, allowing his spirit to become a powerful deity in exchange for his services. By 1991, Shandor possesses the body of Mayor Jock Mulligan and makes Peck head of PCOC to hinder the Ghostbusters, while he abducts his descendant – Dr. Ilyssa Selwyn – to invoke the nodes of his mandala and revive Gozer's Mr. Stay-Puft Destructor form. After Gozer is defeated by the Ghostbusters and Dr Selwyn is freed, the disillusioned Shandor forsakes Gozer and decides to use the mandala to deify himself, boastfully renaming himself "The Architect" (Class 7 Transformed Mortal Remnant). He is defeated when the Ghostbusters cross their proton streams during the fight after following him into the Underworld.

The 2021 film Ghostbusters: Afterlife reveals that Shandor's preserved body was placed in a glass coffin within a Gozerian temple built under the Shandor Mines, which doubles as a portal to manifest Gozer. Egon’s estranged daughter Callie and grandchildren Phoebe and Trevor inherit his home and secret lab after he dies attempting to prevent Gozer's return. Guided by Egon's spirit, Phoebe and Trevor discover his old ghostbusting equipment and learn of Shandor's plan. Revived in his body once Gozer fully manifests, Shandor praises the deity and expresses his desire to rule by its side before Gozer rips him in half.

The Ghostbusters: Afterlife script and credits list the spelling of the surname as Shandor; this is correct for the Magyar language (Hungarian), which spells the English /s/ sound as <sz>, pronounces its written "s" like English "sh", and is where the name originated (as a variant of Alexander); the Magyar variant of his forename is Ivan. His canonical forename is the South Slavic (Bosniaks, Croats, Serbs) Ivo; his surname in that language would have been Šandor. In the Romanian language, his name would have been spelt Ioan Șandor.

Shandor's native Kingdom of Romania had only recently been established at time of birth, was multi-ethnic, and fell to the Austro-Hungarian Empire. The spelling Shandor is displayed on-screen in the original film but is not in the subtitles; this represents his adopted country, the United States of America.

== Ghostbusters II (1989) ==
=== Human characters ===
==== Oscar Barrett ====
Oscar Barrett (played by William T. Deutschendorf and Hank J. Deutschendorf II) is Dana Barrett's baby boy, born 8 months prior to the beginning of Ghostbusters II. He is nearly sacrificed to serve as a new earthly incarnation of Vigo the Carpathian, but is saved by the Ghostbusters.

There has been speculation as to who Oscar's father actually is. Sigourney Weaver – on the June 14, 1989 episode of "The Arsenio Hall Show" – recalled she thought the father was the Violinist from the Lincoln Center scene. Referred to by Peter as "The Stiff", the Violinist is given the name "Andre Wallance" in the novelization of the 1984 movie, 'Ghostbusters: The Supernatural Spectacular.' On the 1999 Ghostbusters DVD commentary track, both Joe Medjuck and Ivan Reitman state that Oscar's father is the Violinist. In July 2016, Ivan Reitman changed his opinion to Oscar's father probably being Peter Venkman (Bill Murray). However, this is contradicted by Dana and Peter revealing in Ghostbusters II that they had long not been involved in a romantic relationship. According to Dana, her former husband, and Oscar's father, was a fellow orchestra employee and their relationship fell apart after he accepted a job offer for an orchestra in London. Originally, Dan Aykroyd and Harold Ramis had Peter Venkman as the infant's father when plotting the story.

Peter says to Oscar in their first scene together, "You know, I... I should have been your father. I mean, I could have been..."

==== Jack Hardemeyer ====
Jack Hardemeyer (played by Kurt Fuller), is Mayor Lenny Clotch's assistant. Like Walter Peck, he is skeptical of the Ghostbusters' operations and tries to discredit them. After overstepping his authority and having the Ghostbusters committed to a psychiatric hospital under the pretense of protecting the mayor's political interests, Hardemeyer is then fired for his misconduct. However, on Liberty Island, Hardemeyer is by the mayor's side again during him giving a Key to the city to the Ghostbusters, indicating that he got his job back. In a deleted scene, it is revealed that he was originally supposed to be killed off by the mood slime, but it changed because it is too gruesome at that time for a family comedy film.

==== Janosz Poha ====
Dr. Janosz Poha (played by Peter MacNicol) is Dana Barrett's boss at the fictional Manhattan Museum of Art. He is somewhat nerdy and harbours a hopeless love interest in her. Janosz is later enslaved by Vigo the Carpathian to bring Dana's baby Oscar to serve as a new vessel for Vigo's evil spirit. However, Vigo's plan for reanimation is stopped by the Ghostbusters, who also manage to free Janosz from Vigo's spell.

=== Supernatural entities ===
==== Vigo the Carpathian ====
Vigo the Carpathian (full name: "Prince Vigo von Homburg Deutschendorf") (Wilhelm von Homburg) appears in the second film as the main antagonist. He was a sadistic and power-hungry 16th/17th century tyrant of Carpathia and the conquered country of Moldavia. He describes himself as the "Scourge of Carpathia" and "the Sorrow of Moldavia." His unfortunate subjects gave him other titles: Vigo the Cruel, Vigo the Torturer, Vigo the Despised and Vigo the Unholy. During his time, he was as despotic as other notorious tyrants in history like Attila and Genghis Khan, and according to Leon Zundinger's article in the occult text Magicians, Martyrs and Madmen, that "Carpathia was in a constant state of turmoil" until he died. Peter Venkman (Bill Murray)—upon hearing all these unflattering titles—cynically commented, "Wasn't he also 'Vigo the Butch?'"

Born in 1505, Vigo was a warlock skilled in black magic, granting him an unnaturally long life span. It came to an equally unnatural end when in the year 1610, he was "poisoned, stabbed, shot, hung, stretched, disemboweled, drawn and quartered." In spite of all that, as Ray Stantz (Dan Aykroyd) notes about Vigo, "just before his head died, his last words were, 'Death is but a Door; Time is but a Window... I'll be back!'" Vigo was based on Vlad the Impaler (the inspiration for Dracula by Bram Stoker), and in part on Grigori Rasputin, who also survived several attempts on his life.

In addition to the dark arts, Vigo was also skilled in painting. This combination provided him with the means to remain within the mortal realm after death. Vigo's spirit possesses and remains within his life-size self-portrait, which inevitably arrives at the restoration department of the fictitious Manhattan Museum of Art in 1989. In Ghostbusters terminology from West End Games' role-playing game, Vigo would be a Class 4 Full-Torso Apparition, as he was human in appearance and identified easily. He is also designated as a Class 4 Possessor in Erik Burnham's Tobin's Spirit Guide: Official Ghostbusters Edition. However as the events of Ghostbusters II progressed, Vigo drew strength from the negatively-charged rivers of psychomagnotheric "mood" slime (revealed later in Ghostbusters: The Video Game produced by the Gozarian cultists under Ivo Shandor) flowing beneath Manhattan. In doing so, his potency increased to the comparable levels of a Class 7 entity. With his newfound power, Vigo manipulates art gallery curator Dr. Janosz Poha into finding a child whose body he can permanently inhabit at the stroke of midnight on New Year's Day, causing a supernatural crisis throughout the city that later labeled as the "Vigo Incident of '89". Janosz chooses Oscar, in return for being allowed to take Dana as his wife. His plan is foiled by the Ghostbusters' use of positive mood slime, disrupting his attempts to possess Oscar. Needing a host, Vigo briefly possesses Ray Stantz, but this gives Winston Zeddemore a better aim for firing his slime blower while Egon Spengler and Peter Venkman fire their particle throwers at Vigo's painting's canvas without harming Stantz, and he is again trapped within his painting.

In the animated series The Real Ghostbusters, Vigo was mentioned in the sixth episode of season 5 "Partners in Slime", indicating that he also exist in the animated Ghostbusters canon as an unseen character.

In Ghostbusters: The Video Game, the portrait of Vigo is stored in the Ghostbusters' firehouse as one of the cursed artifacts they collect and filed. Though unable to again be a threat without access to Shandor's psychomagnotheric slime to draw strength from, Vigo can only taunt anybody who approaches him. He also makes cryptic predictions based on real-world history, as the game's release post-dates the time period of the game by nearly two decades, along with outcomes of the game's future events.

Vigo's full name is a combination of the stage name of Norbert Grupe (aka Wilhelm von Homburg), who played Vigo, and William and Henry Deutschendorf, the twins that played the baby Oscar. The menacing voice of Vigo was provided by Max von Sydow.

==== The Scoleri Brothers ====
Nunzio and Tony Scoleri were portrayed by puppeteers Tim Lawrence and Jim Fye, respectively, and co-created by Henry Mayo with collaborations with Lawrence, Thomas Enriquez, and Howie Weed. In the film, the brothers were convicted murderers sentenced to death by electric chair by the then-newly appointed Judge Stephen "The Hammer" Wexler at Ossining Correctional Facility in 1948. Since then, they have haunted the Foley Square Courthouse as unseen poltergeists, where Wexler tried them.

Forty-three years later, they manifest as Class 4 Noncorporeal Elemental Spirits when Wexler was trying the Ghostbusters in court, unintentionally scaring him so much he rescinded the court judgment on the Ghostbusters practicing their craft. Nunzio also carries the trial's prosecutor to the hall; the prosecutor survived but was traumatized by her ordeal.

== Extreme Ghostbusters (1997) ==
=== Eduardo Rivera ===
Eduardo Rivera (voiced by Rino Romano) was first introduced as one of the next generation of Ghostbusters in Extreme Ghostbusters. Seemingly a lazy, sarcastic and somewhat clueless character, Eduardo nevertheless makes himself an integral part of the team by being determined and reliable. Eduardo, along with Garrett, resembles original Ghostbuster Peter Venkman in that, like Venkman, Eduardo is sarcastic, has a penchant for pursuing women, and is generally unscientific. He constantly spouts pop culture references and reads "J.N. Kline" young-adult horror novels. Eduardo has a long-running subplot dealing with a love–hate relationship between him and Kylie, although it is revealed "In Your Dreams" that he has intimate feelings and dreams about her. These feelings are reinforced in that he is usually the one to rescue Kylie from dangerous situations, and vice versa, in several episodes. He once said to Kylie herself that nothing was going to happen to her "while [he's] around". In fact, in the episode "Darkness at Noon" he outright admitted to Kylie, who was possessed by a ghost at the time, that he felt an attraction of sorts when he saw her for the first time and even showed the intention of kissing her when Kylie asked him to. In "The Unseen" he takes the rap for Kylie's mistake, not wanting "the worst day of her life to get any worse". In "Rage", Eduardo reveals to have an older brother, Carlos "Carl" Rivera, an NYPD officer who is angry with Eduardo for not being a police officer like the rest of their family, and thinks the Ghostbusters are a scam, which is why Eduardo kept his job a secret. In the same episode it is also implied that his father is dead (or at least retired) as he and Carlos refer to him in the past tense during a heated argument. In "Fear Itself", it is revealed that Eduardo has a fear of death (specifically his own). He has a vicious rivalry with Slimer, but has ended up working with the ghost, and volunteered to save him in "Slimer's Sacrifice". He also has an on-the-surface rivalry with Garrett, with the two often mocking each other and attempting to one-up the other. In spite of this, as the series goes on, the two seem to have the closest thing to a friendship even though Garrett's enthusiastic personality completely contrasts Eduardo's cynical attitude. (The official website claimed he slacks off due to fear of failure.) Despite all his cynicism and slacking he demonstrates a reasonably high level of intelligence as in the episode "Eyes of a Dragon" he explained how the proton aspect of light works to Kylie and later on how to defeat the ghost of that episode. Eduardo was also the one to smash a cursed orb, causing the eye-stealing ghost to disintegrate in the episode "The Unseen", and also continued the incantation that destroyed the demon of an alternate dimension in which he, Roland and Kylie were imprisoned in the episode "Casting the Runes". Eduardo has also exhibited bouts of jealousy whenever Kylie seemingly flirts with other men and in "Till Death Do Us Start" he showed signs of sheepish nervousness when asked if he and Kylie were together.

=== Kylie Griffin ===
Kylie Griffin (voiced by Tara Charendoff) was first introduced as one of the next generation of Ghostbusters in Extreme Ghostbusters. She is appointed by the group to carry the ghost trap on her back. She becomes involved with the Ghostbusters after enrolling in Egon Spengler's course at City College of New York. Kylie shares certain traits with Egon, such as knowledge of the supernatural. Both are eccentric and socially awkward and they both had encounters with supernatural beings from their childhood (Egon met the Boogeyman and Kylie's friend was taken by the Grundel). As part of Extreme Ghostbusters, Kylie is featured in the video games Extreme Ghostbusters for the Game Boy Color, Extreme Ghostbusters: Code Ecto-1 for Game Boy Advance and Extreme Ghostbusters: The Ultimate Invasion for the PlayStation. She was also the basis of several action figures from Trendmasters. Kylie is widely regarded as the fan favorite of Extreme Ghostbusters.

Kylie reappears as a supporting character in IDW Publishing's Ghostbusters comic. She first appears in issue 5 in 2012 as the manager of Ray Stantz's occult book shop. In November 2012, it was announced that Kylie would be made an official Ghostbuster in issues beginning in February 2013.

=== Roland Jackson ===
Roland Jackson (voiced by Alfonso Ribeiro) was first introduced as one of the next generation of Ghostbusters in Extreme Ghostbusters. He is the mechanic of the group. Roland is the most level-headed and mechanically gifted of the new Ghostbusters, helping Egon repair and improve the Proton Packs and Ecto-1; his reason for joining Egon's class was seeing the Ecto-1 at an auto show. Roland approaches the paranormal from a practical point-of-view, and in the episode "Fear Itself" reveals that his only fear is the dangerous breakdown of his equipment. In "The Infernal Machine", he became disgruntled that his technological efforts were being taken for granted. Roland's strongest wish is to get into the Ivy League and become a doctor. He's a very staid, square personality, slow to anger, though he came close to striking one of the racists in "The True Face of the Monster"; it is implied he has had to deal with racist attitudes before. Roland has twice come under the mental control of villains, the Siren in "Sonic Youth" and Luko in "The Infernal Machine". "Grease" reveals Roland is the oldest in a lower-middle-class family and volunteers for the Little League and helps the homeless; in "Grundelesque" we meet his very mischievous younger brother whom Roland (at first) refuses to believe is a troublemaker. Like Winston, Roland is the only African American member of the team, yet he has a talent with machines like Ray.

=== Garrett Miller ===
Garrett Miller (voiced by Jason Marsden) was first introduced as one of the next generation of Ghostbusters in Extreme Ghostbusters. Garrett is a lifelong wheelchair user, has a very 'jock'-like attitude and is a huge fan of extreme sports and attempting mad stunts. In the episode "Grease", it is revealed that Garrett was born with the inability to walk and studying to be a physical therapist, and throughout the series he only refers to his condition to mock it (and in "Be Careful What You Wish For", uses it as an excuse to dump some work on Eduardo). He is the most headstrong and enthusiastic of the new Ghostbusters, often claiming that he is in it only for the adrenaline rush; he was left bitterly disappointed in "Ghost Apocalyptic Future" to learn he was the only Ghostbuster not remembered in the future dystopia. While he studies to be a physical therapist to help other disabled people, his secret dream is to be an NBA star. In "Fear Itself", it is revealed that Garrett is claustrophobic (though he never admits it to anyone), and has a deep disdain towards the FBI ever since the incident where two agents arrested them under the belief they were causing the sabotages and released a gremlin they recently captured while they were on a plane. He has a rivalry with Eduardo, the two of them constantly bantering and trying to one-up each other. In "Deadliners", we find out Garrett wrote a (bad) horror story starring himself (the other Ghostbusters died on the first page, to their annoyance). Like Ray, Garrett is the most enthusiastic. Garrett is the only Ghostbuster in the history of the franchise never to be made as a toy (all other Ghostbusters received at least two toys, including Louis and Janine), presumably due to the implausibility of having the wheelchair as a separate assembling piece. Though a prototype figure was made. Bob Higgins has said that during a focus group of young children, the creators found Garrett was the most popular character: "when we asked... which of these characters would you want to be and they all wanted to be Garrett, they all wanted to be the guy that does the crazy things. They all wanted to be the guy that was the leader and they all kind of saw him as the leader of this group [even though he wasn't]".

== Ghostbusters: Answer the Call (2016) ==
=== Human characters ===
==== Abby Yates ====
Dr. Abigail L. "Abby" Yates is portrayed by Melissa McCarthy in the 2016 film, and is the Ghostbusters' de facto leader.

In the novelization, she transferred to Erin's high school after moving from Indiana in her senior year. The two became fast friends due to their fascinations with the paranormal, and spent their college years at the University of Michigan researching ghosts. They collaborated on a book about their findings, but Erin backed out of a planned interview after her graduate advisor at Princeton panned the project. Undaunted, she moved to New York City to continue her research. Like Erin, her expertise is Particle Physics, but Abby fancies herself as a fearless parapsychologist, having an additional degree in the field.

In the film, she rereleases her book without Erin's consent, threatening her bid for tenure. When Erin demands to have the book taken down, Abby complies in exchange for her participation at a ghost investigation with Holtzmann at the Aldridge Mansion Museum. She shares traits with Ray Stantz - both have been possessed and have the same enthusiasm and talent for invention. Like the Ghostbusters from another narrative universe (established by Dan Aykroyd, Harold Ramis, and Ivan Reitman in the 1984 film), Abby likes Chinese food, especially wontons, and is a regular patron of Zhu's Authentic Hong Kong Food. However, she is frustrated with their delivery man, Benny (Karan Soni), who fails to deliver her orders correctly, suspecting him of stealing the food she paid for. Abby hires Kevin Beckman to carry heavy equipment, but having an attraction to "huskier men" she does not find him attractive.

==== Erin Gilbert ====
Dr. Erin Gilbert, Abby Yates' second-in-command, is played by Kristen Wiig in the 2016 film. She is introduced as an assistant particle physics professor at Columbia University, but her bid for tenure fails after her previous research into the paranormal with Abby comes to light. Having been repeatedly stalked by a ghost of a deceased neighbor when she was 8 years old, Erin later loses her belief in the supernatural after years of psychiatric therapy paid by her family but regains it after encountering Gertrude Aldridge's ghost.

She shares traits with Peter Venkman as both kept getting slimed and are also team leaders with a sense of humor and attraction to the opposite gender. Erin is attracted to Kevin Beckman, and she had tried to seduce him; her motive of hiring him as a receptionist is for her to look at.

In the novelization, she is depicted as having grown up near Battle Creek, Michigan; she met Abby in her senior year of high school and spent much of her time at the University of Michigan researching ghosts with Abby. She did postgraduate work at Princeton University and got her doctorate at MIT. In the extended version of the film, revealed that Erin was dating fellow Columbia University professor Phil Hudson (Justin Kirk), but their relationship ended after Erin got fired. Also, like Egon Spengler, Erin is prone to violent reactions when pushed too far temperamentally and has a powerful right cross that would break one's nose.

==== Jillian Holtzmann ====
Dr. Jillian "Holtz" Holtzmann is portrayed by Kate McKinnon in the 2016 film. An engineering physicist by training who just missed being admitted to CERN, she is introduced as Abby's research partner on the paranormal (taking over Erin Gilbert's position) and becomes the team's equipment designer, constructing their proton packs as well as a range of auxiliary weapons. Though she is implied to be a lesbian (as McKinnon is in real life), Holtzmann seems to be attracted to Kevin Beckman's charisma, despite his stupidity. She is hinted to have a romantic interest in Erin, as seen in an alternate ending scene where she claims that they are dating, as well as several other instances of flirting throughout the film. Her mentor is Dr. Rebecca Gorin (Sigourney Weaver), revealed later in IDW Comics's series Ghostbusters 101 that she is a parallel universe counterpart of Dana Barrett.

In the novelization, it is revealed that several of her peers in school started calling her by her last name because "Jillian" sounded too feminine, and by the time of the film she almost never answers to her first name. She shares traits with Egon Spengler; both are highly intelligent, tend to do strange things, and eat junk food.

Director Paul Feig confirmed in an interview with The Daily Beast that Holtzmann was supposed to be a lesbian, or somewhere on the LGBT+ spectrum, but the studio refused to allow that detail into the movie and instead left the audience to more personally interpret her character. She was also observed by some viewers to depict autistic traits, or more specifically, someone with Asperger syndrome.

==== Patty Tolan ====
Patricia "Patty" Tolan is portrayed by Leslie Jones in the 2016 film. She works for the New York MTA as a subway booth attendant, and is the only member of Abby's team who does not have an advanced degree, but is working on her master's in history. She is however, a big fan of non-fiction and is a municipal historian with intense knowledge of New York's history. After contacting them to report a ghost sighting in one of the tunnels, she joins the team and borrows a hearse from her uncle Bill Jenkins's funeral home that is eventually converted into Ecto-1, a vehicle for personnel and equipment transport.

She shares traits with Winston Zeddemore (revealed later in IDW Comics's series Ghostbusters 101 that her uncle is a parallel universe counterpart of him) as both believe in the supernatural without being scientists, and are African American.

==== Kevin Beckman ====
Kevin Beckman is the Ghostbusters' receptionist in the 2016 film, played by Chris Hemsworth. He serves as the male counterpart to Janine Melnitz from the first two films, a "fellow in distress" (a damsel in distress role thus in Dana Barrett's position), and an embodiment of the jock stereotype. In the film, the team is skeptical about hiring him since he is silly and a bit of a dullard. However, he gets the job because no one else applied, and he is seen as a nice, calm guy. Additionally, the girls desperately need his help on carrying heavy equipment due to him being a muscleman. Erin Gilbert nurses a crush on him, and even Jillian Holtzmann is apparently also attracted to him, with the former has tried to seduce him. Kevin sometimes provides jokes throughout the film. Later, he is inspired to be a fifth Ghostbuster. Kevin becomes possessed by the spirit of Rowan North, who uses him as a host and goes to the Mercado Hotel to activate the device to unleash the ghost army in New York City. The Ghostbusters arrive in the building to save him and Rowan discards him but the girls catch him when Kevin falls down to the floor. After repelling Rowan's invasion, Kevin is back in his job as the girls see him as a valuable worker in their business.

==== Rowan North ====
Dr. Rowan North appears in the 2016 film as the main antagonist, portrayed by Neil Casey. In the film, he is essentially a combination of Gozer the Gozerian and Ivo Shandor. Numerous diplomas on his wall indicate that he is a scientist, having earned a bachelor's degree and a Doctorate in Physics from Stanford University and Massachusetts Institute of Technology, respectively, making him a foil personality to Abby Yates, Erin Gilbert, and Jillian Holtzmann. However, due to a psychiatric disorder, Rowan has been unable to find steady work in his field and works in the Mercado Hotel as a maintenance man. He is also a skilled comics artist, and makes a lot of horrific doodles of his plans on pages of a copy of Erin Gilbert and Abby Yates's book "Ghosts from Our Past".

Rowan is miserable with his life and blames everyone for him being scorned and mocked. An occultist with a god complex, Rowan plans revenge by unleashing a ghost army in New York City. He places ionizers (similar to the Ghostbusters' proton packs) he built all over Manhattan connected to the main machine in the Mercado Hotel, as a former site of paranormal history of violence that sat on the intersection of ley lines running through Manhattan. He uses the ionizers to charge the ley lines, intending to activate a vortex between the mortal and ghostly dimensions. Rowan also used Gilbert and Yates's book as foundation for his plans, developing his technology based on their research. When the Ghostbusters discovered his plans, he electrocuted himself with his main machine. However, while reading Rowan's copy of her book, Gilbert discovers that Rowan planned to commit suicide all along so he could become a godlike ghost (Class 7 manifestation) powered by his machine's ionized psi energy. After briefly possessing Abby, Rowan then possessed Kevin Beckman to get to the Mercado and activate the portal machine, unleashing ghosts in New York. When the Ghostbusters arrived, Rowan discarded Kevin, took on a perverted, kaiju-like form of the caricature ghost from the Ghostbusters logo, and went on a rampage. The women destroyed the vortex by firing their particle throwers at Ecto-1's reactor, detonating a nuclear explosion inside it. Rowan was pulled into the Ghost World, but caught Abby, trying to kill her. Erin entered the dimension and saved her, leaving Rowan trapped in the Ghost World.

=== Supernatural entities ===
==== Gertrude Aldridge ====
Gertrude Aldridge, portrayed by Bess Rous, was the first ghost seen by Erin, Abby and Holtzmann in the 2016 film, in a similar role to the Library Ghost in the 1984 film. Gertrude Aldridge was the psychotic eldest daughter of a wealthy New York City aristocrat who murdered her family's servants. To avoid scandals, rather than turn her into the police or have her committed, the Aldridges lock her away for life in their manor's basement, feeding her through a small slot on the door. This secret is eventually discovered by another family, the Mulgraves, after they found her father's journal and remains, and they later discovered that the basement is haunted after hearing Gertrude's wailing as a poltergeist (Class 2 or 3 entity, noncorporeal and telekinetic). The manor becomes the city's haunting attraction, and the house has turned into a museum. However, after its supernatural activity had diminished at some point, the Mulgraves and their employees then fake them to keep the manor open.

In the present day, she haunts the Aldridge Mansion Museum when tour guide Garrett (Zach Woods) was about to head home. As soon as Garrett heard her banging on the basement door, he makes numerous attempts to escape before clinging on a collapsed stair for dear life. Gertrude later reveals herself from the green ectoplasm on the floor, with Garrett shrieking. Despite these attacks, Garrett manages to escape and informs his boss Ed Mulgrave Jr., who is well-aware of the manor's supernatural history, who contacts Erin for help. While Abby and the group were inspecting the mansion, she manifests from the basement door as a Class 4 Semi-Anchored Entity, electrified by Rowan North's ionizer, and moving towards the group. When Erin tries to communicate with her, Gertrude suddenly transmogrifies and vomits ectoplasm on Erin, then escapes out of a wall and into the streets.

During Rowan's invasion of New York City, the team, calling themselves "Ghostbusters" encounter her again, alongside the Electrocuted Ghost found in the subway and Mayhem. She participates in the battle by picking Erin up off the ground and throwing her to a nearby pilgrim ghost. She later attempts to attack Erin again with "Sparky", but they end up getting knocked back by a proton shotgun blast.

==== Electrocuted Ghost ====
The Electrocuted Ghost (not to be confused with the Scoleri brothers of the 1989 film, though, like them, he is also a Class 4 Semi-Anchored Noncorporeal Elemental Entity), also known as "Sparky", is the second ghost Erin, Abby and Holtzmann spotted at Seward Street Subway Station in Auburn, New York. It is heavily implied that he is the ghost of William Kemmler, the first inmate executed by electric chair at Auburn Prison in 1890, based on his resemblance to him. He is portrayed by Dave Allen. Shortly after Rowan North (Neil Casey) gave his train ticket to Patty Tolan, he disappeared onto the tracks, causing Patty to go tell him to get out. Instead of finding him, she finds a device on the tracks. The device then opens, revealing the Electrocuted Ghost, causing Patty to flee. Later, the team arrive with Patty and after inspecting the tracks for a bit, Sparky appears. The team decides to test their new proton lasers on him, but the first attempt did not have enough power to even reach the ghost. After being caught in the second attempt, a train later hits Sparky, nearly killing the group as well. Patty then states he will be the third scariest thing on the train.

The Ghostbusters encounter "Sparky" again, alongside Gertrude Aldridge and Mayhem during the Battle for New York. He joins Gertrude Aldridge in trying to attack Erin, but they get knocked back by a proton shotgun blast, which caused him to disintegrate.

==== Mayhem ====
Mayhem is a Class 5 supernatural entity that haunts Stonebrook Theatre. Its origins are unknown but likely it was not human based on its bestial appearance akin to a bat, suggesting it an animal spirit claiming the theater as its territory, and it manifested after Rowan North planted his ionizer there. The entity plays the similar role to Slimer in the 1984 film as being the first spirit the Ghostbusters have caught during their public debut, even having the same color. Mayhem later escapes, during which it murders paranormal debunker, Doctor Martin Heiss (portrayed by Bill Murray), by throwing him through a window, similar to Slimer's attack to Heiss' facsimile Peter Venkman in the 1984 film though he survived.

The Ghostbusters encounter Mayhem again, alongside Gertrude Aldridge and "Sparky" during the Battle for New York.

== Ghostbusters: Afterlife (2021) ==
=== Human characters ===
==== Phoebe Spengler ====
Phoebe is portrayed by Mckenna Grace in Ghostbusters: Afterlife. Phoebe is the youngest grandchild of founding Ghostbusters member, Dr. Egon Spengler (Harold Ramis). She is intelligent, resourceful, inquisitive, and in many ways takes after her grandfather and an aspiring scientist. She initially is a skeptic on the paranormal-like ghosts until the encounter with her ghostly grandfather. Trying to fit in with normal social cues, Phoebe attempts to connect with people, leading her to use a series of bad jokes. She also tells jokes to cope with her anxiety or to distract others. Like Egon, Phoebe is also a puzzle and chess hobbyist. In addition, she is skilled in locksport, in which her mother often calls Phoebe for lockpicking when having no keys to open doors to her own properties. She also shares Egon's fondness for junk foods like popcorn and, like him, she is prone to violent reactions when pushed too far temperamentally, as demonstrated by her being tempted to fire a proton stream at Sheriff Sherman Domingo and his deputies. As stated by her mother Callie, Phoebe is having difficulty relating to her father due to them having nothing in common. Due to the family's financial troubles and eviction, Phoebe travels with her mother and older brother Trevor to Summerville, Oklahoma to begin anew at the farmhouse left to them by the now deceased Egon. It is here that she discovers the farmhouse is being haunted and a hidden ghost trap belonged to her grandfather, and her family's connection to the original Ghostbusters team's legacy. Rather than being scared, Phoebe is curious of the house's poltergeist after knowing that the ghost is benign, leading her to discover that the entity is the grandfather she never acquainted. Fascinated with the Ghostbusters and their exploits and technology, she then restores their equipment after Egon leads her to his storm cellar laboratory, during which she alters one of his jumpsuits for her to wear. In time, Phoebe becomes confident of herself and brave when facing dangers; this development later surprises her mother when Phoebe wards off Vinz Clortho. Being lonely, Phoebe befriends a boy who goes by the name Podcast, another outcast who believes in conspiracy theories, and bonds with her grandfather, despite his being a ghost. She eventually forms her own team and using Egon's lab as the new Ghostbusters' headquarters, and comes face-to-face with Gozer, helping to trap the malevolent being. After Gozer is defeated once more, Phoebe receives a commendation from Peter Venkman, thus acknowledges her as a Ghostbuster, and she grieves over her grandfather after seeing his departure to the afterlife.

==== Trevor Spengler ====
Trevor is portrayed by Finn Wolfhard in Ghostbusters: Afterlife. Trevor is the eldest grandchild of Egon Spengler. A motorhead, he loves cars and is his family's mechanic, responsible for the maintenance of his mother's Subaru Outback. He finds and eventually repairs the Ghostbusters' Cadillac, ECTO-1 (with a little of ghost Egon's help in mending circuits). Unlike his sister, Trevor bears no resemblance to their maternal grandfather, embodies average teenage boy stereotypes of obsessing over driving and girls. The only thing that Trevor and Egon apparently had in common is that they are both skilled automotive mechanics. At the same time, he adjusts to their new life in Summerville, Oklahoma, gets himself a job as a carhop at the drive-in diner, Spinners Roller Hop, to help his mother financially and to be close to the waitress Lucky Domingo. Trevor is a skeptic, and as supernatural phenomena begins to occur in Summerville, he becomes a reluctant third member of his sister's Ghostbusters team after Podcast, serving as Ecto-1's driver. It is Trevor who realizes that the mass-trap needs more power to work, and uses his proton pack to boost the capacitors on the farm.

==== Podcast ====
Podcast is portrayed by Logan Kim in Ghostbusters: Afterlife and Ghostbusters: Frozen Empire. Podcast is Phoebe's classmate in Summerville Middle School; he befriends Phoebe after seeing that, like him, she also needs a friend. He is a paranormal believer and conspiracy theorist who makes a series of vlogs detailing strange events and occasional restaurant reviews in Summerville, in which the forty-sixth episode is the most popular and attracts Ray Stantz as his only subscriber. Though not as scientifically minded as Phoebe he has high intellect and investigative mind, thereby an amateur sleuth. As a conspiracy theorist, Podcast suspects that Egon Spengler was murdered before anybody else does. He keeps Egon's Aztec Death Whistle as a souvenir and his means against evil spirits (even though it is ineffective against Muncher). After learning Phoebe's relation with one of the original Ghostbusters, he becomes a second member of Phoebe's own Ghostbusters team.

==== Lucky Domingo ====
Lucky Domingo is portrayed by Celeste O'Connor in Ghostbusters: Afterlife. Lucky is a classmate at Summerville High School who befriends Trevor soon after he moves to town. She also works at Spinners Roller Hop as a carhop and is the daughter of the town sheriff. Her family has been living in Summerville since her great-grandparents following the town's establishment. Hating her tedious town life and seeking adventure, Lucky becomes the fourth member of Phoebe Spengler's Ghostbusters team after Trevor, providing her extensive knowledge on Summerville to Phoebe.

==== Callie Spengler ====
Callie is portrayed by Carrie Coon in Ghostbusters: Afterlife. She is Egon Spengler's daughter, divorced and unemployed. She struggles to make ends meet and is eventually evicted from their apartment in Chicago due to late rent payments. Having never reconciled with Egon, she is unaware of his whereabouts or activities until told of his death. Like her father, Callie enjoys Chinese food and shares his fondness for egg rolls. When she arrives at the farmhouse in Summerville, Oklahoma she meets Janine Melnitz who clarifies her late father's situation. She subsequently meets and dates Phoebe's summer schoolteacher Gary Grooberson, but is possessed by the demon Zuul, Gatekeeper of Gozer, and freed when Phoebe and Podcast open a ghost trap underneath her terror dog incarnation. She then assists the neophyte Ghostbusters in their defense of the farm and the mass-trap of Gozer. When Egon appeared as a ghost, she finally reconciles and makes peace with him before he departs for the afterlife.

==== Gary Grooberson ====
Gary Grooberson is portrayed by Paul Rudd in Ghostbusters: Afterlife. He is Phoebe and Podcast's science teacher and a seismologist, investigating mysterious local earthquakes. Despite being a scientist, Phoebe initially stereotyped Grooberson as a middle school football coach based on his unkempt appearance and seemingly laid-back attitude. Besides having expertise on seismology, Grooberson also has knowledge in world history and culture, indicated by his familiarity with cuneiform writings and Aztec objects. He is also a fan of the Ghostbusters and believer of the paranormal, and loves popular culture such as cinemas and comic books. Needing income while staying in Summerville, he takes the job as a summer schoolteacher. He is apathetic about his job, and because most of his students are delinquents and not interested in learning, he just lets them watch old violent movies in his classroom and gets paid while focusing on his seismic investigations - except Phoebe and Podcast, whom he mentors in science and the paranormal. When Phoebe brings Gary a Ghost Trap she found in the Spengler farmhouse, he assumes it is a replica. After discovering the device is real and Phoebe's relation to Egon Spengler, Gary is supportive of Phoebe following her grandfather's footsteps as a Ghostbuster. After Gary and Callie begin dating, Phoebe initially feels uncomfortable, but she later accepts their relationship. Gary plays a news clip on YouTube, showing them footage of the Ghostbusters during what came to be known as the Manhattan Crossrip of 1984.

In Ghostbusters: Frozen Empire, Gary's childhood dream of becoming a Ghostbuster is fulfilled after he moved to New York City with the Spenglers, collaborating with them, his idols, Podcast, and Lucky Domingo. He has become a father figure to Callie's children and is especially very protective of Phoebe. In addition of using the Ghostbusters' equipment, Gary also has the capability of repairing them without needing Phoebe or the original Ghostbusters' help.

==== Sherman Domingo ====
Sherman Domingo is Summerville's sheriff and Lucky's father, and is portrayed by Bokeem Woodbine in Ghostbusters: Afterlife. He is skeptical of the neophyte Ghostbusters' operations in Summerville. He and Deputy Medjuck (portrayed by Dan Aykroyd's daughter Stella) pursued and arrested the kids after they stopped the rampaging Muncher. His officers are fascinated with Egon Spengler's equipment after learning that the "dirt farmer" was an inventor. Phoebe dislikes the sheriff's department after they refer to her grandfather as a lunatic. Later, during an interdimensional crossrip event caused by the possessed Grooberson disabling the proton cannons, Domingo's department flee, allowing the neophyte Ghostbusters to retrieve their equipment from the evidence storage locker.

=== Supernatural entities ===
==== Muncher ====
Muncher, voiced by Josh Gad and creature designed by Brynn Metheney, is a new ghost described by the creators as a new generation of Slimer. In life, he was a miner working for Shandor Mining Company who couldn't get enough of the ore he was mining for. After his death, his ghost was conjured into the mortal world by a seance gone awry in the 1940s, in a selenium processing plant owned by his employer. Since then, he is trapped in the factory manager's office where the conjuring occurred. Like Slimer, Muncher is also a Class 5 manifestation and gluttonous spirit, and he is extremotrophic, specifically eats metals and ores, similarly to bacterium Halomonas titanicae. In addition, because of the munching noise he makes while chewing, he is named Muncher by Phoebe and Podcast, after they found him in the plant, where he is eating pipes. After Podcast provoked Muncher with his ineffective death whistle, Phoebe is forced to fight the ghost with her grandfather's proton pack to defend themselves. Following a failed attempt to capture him in the plant, Muncher flees into Summerville and heads to Shandor's mines, leaving a trail of destruction in his wake; the kids have no choice but to stop him, as they are the only people around with the Ghostbusters' means. Phoebe, Podcast and Trevor successfully capture Muncher, but release him later on when they return to Summerville Sheriff Department to retrieve the equipment Lucky's father seized from them. Muncher eats through the bars of the cell housing the Ghostbusters equipment and flees.

== Ghostbusters: Frozen Empire (2024) ==
=== Human characters ===
==== Lars Pinfield ====
Dr. Lars Pinfield is portrayed by James Acaster in Ghostbusters: Frozen Empire. In the film, Lars is an eccentric new recruit and inventor from the United Kingdom who is responsible for creating new technology for the Ghostbusters, include upgrading Egon Spengler's decades-old equipment in his absence. His left hand is frostbitten after touching the brass object Garraka is stored in; his arm is seen in a cast and sling afterwards.

==== Nadeem Razmaadi ====
Nadeem Razmaadi is portrayed by Kumail Nanjiani in Ghostbusters: Frozen Empire. He is a descendant of the Firemasters and inherited their pyrokinetic powers but has no knowledge of them, because he had no interest in his family's history despite his grandmother trying to tell him about his lineage. After getting control over his abilities, and with the help of Melody, Nadeem manages to hold Garraka off for long enough while the original Ghostbusters use the containment field to entrap it.

==== Hubert Wartzki ====
Dr. Hubert Wartzki is portrayed by Patton Oswalt in Ghostbusters: Frozen Empire. His expertises are anthropology and library and information science, and he works at the New York Public Library. Like the Ghostbusters, Wartzki is a paranormal believer and he provides background detail about Garraka to them.

=== Supernatural entities ===
==== Garraka ====
Garraka is an evil Class 7 apocalyptic horned deity trapped inside an ancient orb that functions similarly to witch bottles, witch balls and the Ghostbusters' trapping technology and once belonged to the Firemasters, a benevolent coven who practiced apotropaic magic, capturing evil spirits much like the Ghostbusters. Garraka is so powerful that even while trapped he can mind control ghosts and Gozer's Mini-Pufts. Garraka can create sub-zero temperatures and uses "Kusharit Umoti" - "the power to kill by fear itself". His weaknesses are copper alloys that used for apotropaic practices like brass, combined with fire. He has been weakened by the absence of his horns that augment his powers and properties. Garraka sought to free himself from his imprisonment with the help of the spirit Melody, offering to help her ascend to the afterlife in return. After being freed, he attempted to cast the Ghostbusters' dimension in a deadly winter curse called the Death Chill, but was defeated by the Ghostbusters with the help of Melody, who turned on him after learning that he never planned to help her at all.

==== The Hell's Kitchen Sewer Dragon ====
The Hell's Kitchen Sewer Dragon is a Class 5 entity that was rampaging above New York City and being pursued by the Spengler family-assembled Ghostbusters. He is the first ghost to appeared in the film.

==== Pukey ====
Pukey is a Class 5 entity that rolls around and pukes ectoplasm, it appears like a baby based on its appearance and behaviors. He is also shown to walk. In the Hasbro toy line, Fright Features, he is depicted as throwing up ectoplasm, while donning a meaner look.

==== The Possessor ====
The Possessor is a Class 2 poltergeist that possesses objects. In Frozen Empire, he steals the wax tube containing the chant to free Garraka with a trash bag, He later possess a lion in an attempt to guard said tube, then being blown into bits by Phoebe who uses the Ecto-C. During the start of the climax, he goes to the firehouse in a tricycle, before possessing various objects in order to get to the Ecto-1, in which he tries to kill the Ghostbusters by driving backwards into their path. He transfers upstairs, where he possesses a pizza, flops around, and then is eaten by Slimer. In the Hasbro toy line, Fright Features, he is depicted as a trash bag with legs and a scary face.

==== Melody ====
Melody is portrayed by Emily Alyn Lind in Ghostbusters: Frozen Empire. She is a Class 4 ghost of a 16-year-old girl who was killed in a tenement fire and is unable to pass on, the matchbox that contains the match that started the fire being in her possession, the match unable to be truly used. Since then, she haunts Central Park and frightens people with her presence in spite of her longing for a friend, though in time they see her and other ghosts as pests due to the supernatural has become a common occurrence in New York City for decades caused by Ivo Shandor and his Cult of Gozer. She plays chess with Phoebe, beating her after years of playing following her death, and they become friends. She made a deal with the god Garraka to help him with his plans in exchange for access to the afterlife, but she is also genuinely fond of Phoebe and shows remorse for betraying her trust. Melody later turned against him after seeing that Garraka never intended to help her. After she helped the Ghostbusters defeat Garraka using her matchbox, she is able to finally ascend to the afterlife.
