= Stay Puft Marshmallow Man =

Fictional character from Ghostbusters

Stay-Puft Marshmallow Man
- Ghostbusters character
- Portrayed by Bill Bryan, the Stay-Puft Marshmallow Man serves as the physical avatar for Gozer the Gozerian in the film Ghostbusters (1984).
- First appearance: Ghostbusters (1984)
- Last appearance: Ghostbusters: Frozen Empire (2024)
- Created by: Dan Aykroyd (original concept); Bill Bryan (design)
- Portrayed by: Bill Bryan (suit actor); Anthony Cecere (stunt performer)
- Voiced by: John Stocker; Frank Welker; Ira Heiden; Sarah Natochenny; Shelby Young Jamel Debbouze

In-universe information
- Nickname: Mr. Stay-Puft

The Stay-Puft Marshmallow Man is a fictional character from the Ghostbusters franchise, who appears as a giant, lumbering, and paranormal fluffy monster with a cute but also creepy-looking smile on his face. He first appears in the 1984 Ghostbusters film as a logo on a bag of marshmallows in Dana Barrett's apartment, on an advertisement on a building near the Ghostbusters' headquarters, and finally as the physical manifestation and form of the apocalyptic Sumerian deity Gozer.

Gozer returns in this form multiple times. Subsequently, he has been incorporated into many other types of Ghostbusters media, including the animated series The Real Ghostbusters, comic books, a stage show, and several video games.

== Appearance and character ==
The Stay-Puft Marshmallows Corporation's logo, appeared in the film Ghostbusters (1984) and its sequel films.

Stay-Puft is a large white humanoid figure made of conjoined marshmallows. He wears a white sailor cap with a red ribbon attached on top, and a blue hatband. Around his neck is a traditional blue sailor's collar and a red neckerchief.

After images of him are seen on an advertisement and a bag of the marshmallows earlier in the film, he is then seen in the climax of Ghostbusters as one of the physical manifestations and forms of Gozer, a god who is defeated when Stay-Puft is destroyed. Stay-Puft's exact to-scale height in the movie is 112.5 feet (34.29 m) tall, while his height in the novelization of the movie is given at 100 feet (30.48 m). In Ghostbusters: The Video Game, Stay-Puft is categorized as a Class 7 Outsider Avatar.

He is then resurrected and subsequently captured a number of different times by the Ghostbusters. Although mean and destructive at first, he later befriends Slimer and the Ghostbusters in the animated series The Real Ghostbusters, and helps them out with various problems.

== Concept and debut ==
Dan Aykroyd conceived the Stay-Puft Marshmallow Man for his initial script for Ghostbusters. He created the character to show that "it seems harmless and puffy and cute—but given the right circumstances, everything can be turned black and become evil". Stay-Puft was only one of many large-scale monsters in this early draft of the script. But after Aykroyd worked with co-writer Harold Ramis and director Ivan Reitman, the team scaled back the intended sequence partly for budgetary reasons until only Stay-Puft remained.

The likeness of Stay-Puft was inspired by Peter O'Boyle, a security guard at Columbia Pictures whom Reitman met while filming his previous movie, Spacehunter: Adventures in the Forbidden Zone (1983). According to Sam Delaney of The Guardian, "Stay-Puft's familiar mascot combined elements of real-life brand ambassadors the Pillsbury Doughboy and Bibendum (a.k.a. the Michelin Tire Man)."

Gozer the Gozerian, manifests as a gargantuan iteration of the fictional corporate mascot, the Stay-Puft Marshmallow Man, as its Destructor Form and on a rampage across New York City in Ghostbusters (1984).

Stay-Puft is seen only briefly in the movie. He is "conjured up" as a new form for the fictional Sumerian god Gozer, who previously arrives atop an apartment building at 55 Central Park West in New York City in the form of an androgynous woman with metallic skin and blood red eyes. After a quick battle with the Ghostbusters, Gozer vanishes and in its disembodied voice demands the Ghostbusters, "Choose the form of the Destructor" – whatever they think of will be the form it will assume to destroy their world. The other three Ghostbusters proceed to think of nothing at all in an attempt to deny Gozer this wish. Ray Stantz (Aykroyd) instead thinks of the mascot.

As he explains, "It just popped in there", and that he "tried to think of the most harmless thing", describing Mr. Stay-Puft as "something that could never possibly destroy us". Moments later, a giant Stay-Puft Marshmallow Man is seen walking towards the apartment building. The Ghostbusters shoot at Stay-Puft with their proton packs, setting him on fire, but do not succeed in stopping his advance. They then get the idea of shooting at the portal through which the god emerged, by crossing the streams of all four of their packs. The plan triggers an explosion that destroys the gate and Stay-Puft, reducing the latter into molten marshmallow cream that rains down onto the roof of the skyscraper and bystanders on the street below.

The character is also briefly visible in an ad on the side of a building (a matte painting) during the scene where the Ghostbusters headquarters roof explodes. During the egg frying scene in Dana's apartment, a bag of Stay-Puft marshmallows can be seen.

=== Special effects ===
The character as seen in the movie was created by Linda Frobos by using miniatures and optical compositing with Bill Bryan in a latex suit. The suit was made of two layers, an outer flammable layer and inner fire-proof layer. Some of the finished movie's most noticeable errors appear in the Stay-Puft scenes: he is seen with and without his bow tie, while in another scene the optical rendering was so poor that he passes through a church rather than crushing it. Also, the blue portion of his sailor suit is worn backwards.

The face of Stay-Puft was puppeteered by Terri Hardin. She used remote controls while lying down below the miniature street on the set as Bill Bryan walked around for his scene.

== Adaptations ==
=== Games ===
- In Activision's Ghostbusters (1984), designed by David Crane, small ghosts terrorize the city and gather together in front of the "Zuul Building" and occasionally other locations, where after enough of them have collected they would form the Stay-Puft Marshmallow Man, who could destroy some of the nearby buildings. After enough ghosts have entered the Zuul Building, the player could then go to it and find Stay-Puft moving back and forth blocking the entrance. If the player could pass him without being squashed, the player would then climb the stairs and either win the game or find the final boss Gozer at the top of the building, in the form of a woman. On the NES version, Stay-Puft is seen again from the roof on a screen just, below the final boss. He is climbing the building and acts as a counter: if he reaches the top of the building the game ends.
- In Ghostbusters (1990) for the Sega Genesis, "Stay-Puft" appears outside a highrise building punching inward as the player progresses through the level and then appears as a boss at the top of the building, but is not related to Gozer. Here he claims to have eaten too many marshmallows, then realizing he had become the Marshmallow Man. In addition to trying to punch the player from the left and right sides of the screen, he also uses special powers such as breathing fire and shooting laser bolts from his eyes.
- As described earlier, the Stay-Puft Marshmallow Man appears as a boss in all versions of the 2009 game Ghostbusters: The Video Game.
- In TT Games' Lego Dimensions, he is a playable character in the game, with archive audio from the first film for his dialogue. He comes in his own Fun Pack, with a terror dog as his personal vehicle. He is also a boss in the Ghostbusters Level Pack and the Answer the Call Story Pack in brick built form.
- The character is featured in the 2016 Ghostbusters pinball game by Stern Pinball, with a digital version in The Pinball Arcade and Stern Pinball Arcade by FarSight Studios.
- In the game Yo-kai Watch Blasters, the main antagonist and final boss of the game is called Whismellowman, a giant, evil version of Whisper based on the Stay Puft Marshmallow Man. However, in everywhere except Japan and Korea, the design of him was changed to likely avoid a lawsuit and was also renamed “Whisped Cream”.

=== Stage productions ===
- In the Ghostbusters Spooktacular stage show (1990–1996) at Universal Studios, Florida, the ending battle with Stay-Puft has the Ghostbusters destroying him directly, rather than firing at the portal to close the dimensional gateway.

== Post-movie appearances ==
Outside of appearances in the television series, Stay-Puft (seen here menacing the Ghostbusters and Slimer) appeared in numerous issues of the various Ghostbusters comicbook series as well. From The Real Ghostbusters #138. Published by Marvel UK.

Following the original film, the television series The Real Ghostbusters brought Stay-Puft back; in fact Joe Medjuck, the executive producer of the show, states that Stay-Puft was in the first script they received from Dan Aykroyd on the series. In the episode titled, "Mr. Sandman, Dream Me a Dream", a spectral Sandman creates versions of anything which a person is dreaming of – in this way a new version of Stay-Puft is created – however, whatever is created disappears when the person awakens. In the episode "Deadcon 1", Stay-Puft appears as a guest of honor at a ghost convention. After another episode, "Cry Uncle", he is accidentally freed from the Ghostbusters' containment system and later recaptured. He reappears in episode 65, "The Revenge of Murray the Mantis", where he is "released" from the Ghostbusters' containment unit to help defeat a giant mantis too powerful for the Ghostbusters to fight on their own. Stay-Puft is controlled with the help of Slimer (a green blob-like creature). After defeating the Mantis, Stay-Puft floats behind the Ghostbusters in a parade. He later helps them again in the episode "Sticky Business" number 85, when the president of the Stay-Puft Marshmallow Company asks the Ghostbusters if he can use their large Stay-Puft in a television commercial. Once again Slimer goes into the containment unit to bring Stay-Puft out. An episode explains that Egon took a sample of the marshmallow ectoplasm and positively charged it, thus creating a friendly version of the Stay-Puft Marshmallow Man that would assist the Ghostbusters when needed. When questioned by a policeman in the series about the abrupt personality change, Peter replied that Stay-Puft was "all better now". The character was voiced by John Stocker, and later by Frank Welker in this series.

The Terminal Reality game Ghostbusters: The Video Game (2009), set two years after the events of Ghostbusters II, brings back the Stay-Puft Marshmallow Man to ravage Times Square while searching for Dr. Ilyssa Selwyn. Stay-Puft has the ability to spawn Class 5 Manifesting Outworlders, labeled "Marshmallow Minis" that vaguely resemble Gozer's minions Zuul and Vinz Clortho, to do his bidding like overwhelming the Ghostbusters. Peter, Ray, and a new rookie escort Dr. Selwyn to the roof of a tall building. In pursuit, Stay-Puft climbs the side of the building while Egon, at street level, is preparing a large trap. The rookie burns Stay-Puft's face with "Boson Darts" from an upgraded proton pack, causing Stay-Puft to fall to street level, where he exploded upon impact, scattering his marshmallow body, and his hat, which hangs on a nearby building, all over Times Square. Towards the game's climax, the characters realize that Gozer assumed the form of Stay-Puft again because he can only have one destructor form for each dimension he enters; he was locked into the form of the Marshmallow Man when summoned back to the Earthly plane. This causes Ray to admit he had not selected such a bad destructor after all due to it having strategic disadvantages; as demonstrated in the film Ghostbusters (1984), a gargantuan Stay-Puft Marshmallow Man is too slow because of its weight and lack of bones, and had less offensive capability beyond its massive size, thereby making Gozer vulnerable to proton streams and boson darts fired by even just one Ghostbuster when under this form. In comparison, Gozer's Destructor Form is weaker than Ivo Shandor's, which is much faster and agile, and, while in the Ghost World, can charge itself with spiritual energy to make itself stronger, taking five Ghostbusters with every upgraded arsenal that they have to defeat. In the realistic version, the player can listen to one of the in-game answering machine messages from an upset member of the fictional company that owns the Stay-Puft Marshmallow brand (voiced by Chuck Huber), who is unhappy with the recent Gozer/Stay-Puft attack, believing it was a publicity stunt by the Ghostbusters. Another message, implied to be left by a hobo, asks the Ghostbusters if it is safe to eat Stay-Puft's remains. A Stay-Puft Figurine appears as one of the collectible paranormal objects found in the game; it is found in the kitchen area of the Sedgewick Hotel and, after being collected, will appear in the Ghostbuster Firehouse's bunkhouse.

In the Tobin's Spirit Guide, it is revealed that since the defeat by the Ghostbusters, Gozer has been trying to assume a more powerful avatar to correct its mistake.

In the reboot film Ghostbusters (2016), which sets in another narrative universe, Stay-Puft makes a brief appearance as a possessed Thanksgiving parade balloon that pinned the Ghostbusters Abby Yates, Jillian Holtzmann, and Patty Tolan to the ground before being saved by Erin Gilbert, who bursts the balloon. Stay-Puft's role as a hundred foot tall rampaging monster is replaced by the sketch ghost from the Ghostbusters' logo who was morphed into a giant-sized version of itself assumed by Rowan North, the film's antagonist.

Two Mini-Pufts, as appeared in the film Ghostbusters: Afterlife, created by Brynn Metheney.

2021's Ghostbusters: Afterlife revealed that the events of the original Ghostbusters did not tarnish the reputation of the mascot but created a prominence for it. Tiny-sized versions of it (labeled as "Mini-Pufts") make their appearances as Gozer's mischievous minions for purposes of sabotages, deceptions, and distractions. Like Gozer's Destructor Form, they look funny, adorable, seemingly innocent and, additionally, harmless in size (each is 3.5 inches (89 mm) tall) on the outside. However, the Mini-Pufts are chaotic, like their master, and can do plenty of damage as a swarm. In Ghostbusters terminology, they would be Class 5 manifestations, similar to the Marshmallow Minis in Ghostbusters: The Video Game. Numbers of voice actors including Ira Heiden, Sarah Natochenny, and Shelby Young voiced the Mini-Pufts.

The Mini-Pufts also appear in Ghostbusters: Rise of the Ghost Lord. They returned in Ghostbusters: Frozen Empire as the Ghostbusters' captives. In the film, Ray Stantz keeps the surviving Mini-Pufts for company in his bookstore because of his fondness with the Stay-Puft Marshmallows Man, but Podcast hates them ever since they attacked him in the Ecto-1 at Summerville and would try to destroy them with his mallet without Ray's knowing. Later, rival deity Garraka usurps command of the Mini-Pufts from Gozer in its absence, during which they attack Podcast in the car again while the Ghostbusters fight the deity, much to his vexation.

== Merchandise ==
Along with the original 1986 Kenner line of Ghostbusters toys, Stay-Puft has been included in:

- McDonald's Happy Meals
- Specialized monster kits such as those by Tsukuda, who made models of both Stay-Puft and the Terror Dog from the first movie.
- In 2009, Diamond Select Toys released Stay-Puft in 2-inch Minimates mini-figure form as well as 11-inch vinyl bank form. The bank received an angry version at Comic-Con that same year, and glow-in-the-dark versions of both were released in 2010.
- In 2010, and then (redesigned) in 2012, the Stay-Puft Quality brand of gourmet marshmallows were released as official Ghostbusters merchandise with packaging prominently featuring the character.
- Stay-Puft was not present in Mattel's 2009 Ghostbusters toy line, however, Mattel released him as an exclusive collectable for the 2011 San Diego Comic-Con and on MattyCollector.com after the show. This was the biggest version of Stay-Puft to date; he was 20 inches tall, and covered in a soft foam covering.
- In 2011, Rubie's Costume Co. released an inflatable Stay-Puft Halloween costume as a companion piece for the Ghostbusters jumpsuit costumes they had previously created.
- In July 2011, Diamond Select Toys (DST) released a seven-inch light-up statue version of Stay-Puft.
- Stay-Puft Marshmallow Man is playable in Lego Dimensions. He was released in a fun pack with a Terror Dog vehicle/gadget on March 15, 2016.
- Several POP! Vinyl figures of Stay-Puft Marshmallow Man were released by Funko.
- In June 2016, Build-A-Bear Workshop released a stuffed version of Stay-Puft Marshmallow Man as a part of their 2016 Ghostbusters collection.
- Circa 2017, Playmobil created a version apparently similar to the 1980s "The Real Ghostbusters" action figure version.
- In 2017, Bandai created an S.H. Figuarts action figure of the character, as a Tamashii webshop exclusive.
- In 2021, Campfire Marshmallows created bags of Mini-Marshmallows and regular marshmallows with the Stay-Puft branding in conjunction with the upcoming Ghostbusters: Afterlife.
- Welsh brewery Tiny Rebel brew a marshmallow stout called Stay Puft, with artwork resembling the character.
- IKON released a limited edition 46cm poly-stone statue of the character in 2020. This features interchangeable heads and a New York City road display base.
- SH Figuarts released a Stay Puft figurine that is posable, and has interchangeable faces.
