= Ruth Oliver =

Ruth Oliver may refer to:

- Ruth Law Oliver (1887–1970), American aviator
- Ruth Hale Oliver (1910–1988), American astrologer
