= New Ghostbusters II =

1990 video game

- European NES cover art
- Developer: HAL Laboratory
- Publishers: HAL Laboratory; Activision (Game Boy, NA & EU)
- Composer: Jun Ishikawa
- Series: Ghostbusters
- Platforms: Game Boy; Nintendo Entertainment System
- Release: Game Boy: JP: October 16, 1990; NA: December 1990; PAL: 1991; NES/Famicom: JP: December 26, 1990; PAL: 1991
- Genre: Action
- Mode: Single-player

New Ghostbusters II (ゴーストバスターズ２, Gōsutobasutāzu 2) is an action video game for the Nintendo Entertainment System and Game Boy, both developed and published by HAL Laboratory in 1990 in Japan and in 1991 in the PAL region. The NES version was never released in North America due to licensing issues with Activision. As a result, NES players in North America only received Activision's Ghostbusters II game. HAL also developed a Game Boy version of New Ghostbusters II, titled simply Ghostbusters II, which they also published in Japan, while Activision published it in North America and PAL regions.

== Gameplay ==
In the game, the player is presented with four Ghostbusters to choose from: Peter Venkman, Ray Stantz, Egon Spengler, or Winston Zeddemore. The NES version features their accountant, Louis Tully, as a fifth playable character. This, along with the North American version of Ghostbusters II, were the only titles ever released that allowed players to play as Winston. While the action can be performed by oneself in the NES version, a secondary player may join the game with the ability to press B on a second controller to release a ghost-catching trap. The objective of the game is to trap all the ghosts in an area until an arrow appears which alerts the player where to travel to next. A boss appears at the end of each stage.

== Version differences ==
New Ghostbusters II for the NES is not a port of the Game Boy version, or vice versa. The Nintendo Entertainment System version features new music, different layouts for the levels and alternate versions of cut scenes between levels and stage bosses. The Game Boy version has 5 stages. None of the versions of New Ghostbusters II has multi-player capabilities.

== Reception ==
On release, Famitsu magazine scored the Game Boy version of the game a 25 out of 40.
