= Slimer =

Fictional character from Ghostbusters

- Ghostbusters character
- Slimer, as he appeared in the film Ghostbusters (1984) and its sequel Ghostbusters: Frozen Empire (2024), made from the authentic molds for the making of the costumes of the films and displayed at the character's co-creator Steve Johnson's Brick and Mortar Productions Studios.
- First appearance: Ghostbusters (1984)
- Created by: Dan Aykroyd and Harold Ramis (concept); Steve Johnson (design)
- Voiced by: Ivan Reitman (Ghostbusters & Ghostbusters II); Adam Ray (Ghostbusters (2016 film)); Frank Welker (The Real Ghostbusters & Cartoon All-Stars to the Rescue); Billy West (Extreme Ghostbusters); Troy Baker (Ghostbusters: The Video Game)

In-universe information
- Species: Ghost
- Titles: Focused, Non-Terminal Repeating Phantasm; Class 5 Full Roaming Vapor
- Spouse: Lady Slimer (2016 Remake)

Slimer (originally referred to as the Onionhead and sometimes the Mean Green Ghost and the Ugly Little Spud) is a character from the Ghostbusters franchise. Slimer is a green, gluttonous ghost that is the first successful catch of the newly formed Ghostbusters.

He appears in the films Ghostbusters (1984), Ghostbusters II (1989), the remake Ghostbusters (2016), and Ghostbusters: Frozen Empire (2024), in the animated television series: The Real Ghostbusters, Slimer! and Extreme Ghostbusters, and in the video games: Ghostbusters: The Video Game (2009), Beeline's Ghostbusters (2013), Ghostbusters: Spirits Unleashed (2022) and Ghostbusters: Rise of the Ghost Lord (2024). Slimer was voiced by Ivan Reitman and Adam Ray in the films and by Frank Welker in the animated series. In The Real Ghostbusters, he is the Ghostbusters' mascot and friend.

Ghostbusters: Afterlife (2021) instead features a similar ghost named "Muncher".

== Creation and conception ==
=== Ghostbusters ===
During the pre-production of Ghostbusters, Ivan Reitman remarked Slimer was sort of like Bluto in the film Animal House, like the ghost of John Belushi.

Special effects artist Steve Johnson sculpted the gluttonous, slimy, green ghost then known only as the "Onion Head ghost" on set due to the puppet's unpleasant smell. Now commonly known as "Slimer", it was not called that until the 1986 animated television series The Real Ghostbusters. The Slimer design took six months, and approximately $300,000 to develop. It went through many variations, which Johnson blamed on executive interference through micromanagement, constant adjustments, and conflicting notes on how to modify each detail. He said: "In the beginning, they asked for a 'smile with arms' but before I knew it ... 'give him 13% more pathos, put ears on him, take his ears off, less pathos, more pathos, make his nose bigger, now his nose is too big, make his nose smaller ... Make him more cartoony, make him less cartoony."

The day before his deadline, Johnson learned Dan Aykroyd and Harold Ramis had wanted Slimer to be an homage to John Belushi's likeness. With that information and a series of Belushi headshots, Johnson took at least three grams of cocaine and believed that Belushi's ghost was visiting him to provide encouragement. It was during this episode that he sculpted the final Slimer design that appears in the film. Aykroyd admitted the character was inspired by Belushi, particularly his body. Ramis said the comparison was not malicious, explaining that Belushi was the person most likely to trip over a coffee table and knock a bookcase over. The model had three interchangeable faces for larger expressions, while smaller features like blinking were controlled by cables and rods by a team of puppeteers. Smaller, egg-size models were made for less animated movements like flying around the ceiling of the Sedgewick Hotel ballroom. The full-size Slimer puppet was performed by Mark Bryan Wilson, who wore the foam rubber suit reinforced with spandex while being filmed against a black background. As Wilson's movement was restricted by the puppet's cables, the camera was moved around him to simulate movement. Wilson worked with oversized props so the ghost would appear smaller after composited into live-action.

For the live-action set, in the scene where Ray spooks Slimer, a room service cart trailed after him. The cart was motorized and piloted from underneath by one of Chuck Gaspar's crew. Naturally, when the cart crashes, the driver is not present. The shot of Slimer phasing through the wall was shot at Entertainment Effects Group and incorporated optically later on.

=== Ghostbusters II ===
Sculpted character concept of Slimer for the filming of Ghostbusters II that resembles its counterpart from the animated television series The Real Ghostbusters.

Slimer was not always a definite part of the Ghostbusters II script. It was a matter of considerable debate if he should appear at all. Slimer's appeal was widespread among children thanks in part to the first movie and The Real Ghostbusters. Slimer was given a subplot and written into the movie: Slimer would eat various foods in the Firehouse while Louis Tully would try to trap him, then they would become friends. Michael Gross requested that elements of the animated version of Slimer be incorporated into the movie. Tim Lawrence and Thom Enriquez worked on a new design. Meanwhile, Bobby Porter was called in to portray Slimer. Some of the technology and techniques used for Nunzio Scoleri were used for Slimer – the divided head construct, pneumatic jaws, SNARK, and a fat suit – a departure from the first movie where he was hand puppeteered. Then Slimer was removed from the script. Porter was released.

Two weeks later, Slimer was back in the script and had a bigger role. However, Porter was no longer available. Effects coordinator Ned Gorman remembered working with Robin Navlyt on Willow and she was brought in. Navlyt was the same height as Porter and fit into the suit very well. Chris Goehe and his mold shop crew made a full lifecast on her and Al Coulter worked on a new skullcap. The Slimer shoot was finished close to the first day of shooting. Michael Gross was on hand to push the crew to keep Slimer subtle and reduce any complicated approaches to moving him. Slimer's segments were deemed intrusive by preview audiences. During editing, Ivan Reitman decided to limit Slimer's role even though all scripted scenes were filmed and completed. Ultimately, Slimer's scenes were trimmed to two brief shots plus one during the end titles.

=== Origin of name ===
In the script for Ghostbusters, and in the film itself, Slimer is never actually called by any name (the term "slimers" is used to identify a kind of ghost). The creature was called "The Onionhead Ghost" by the film crew, and in the film's closing credits, Steve Johnson is credited as the sculptor for "Onionhead". Slimer was marketed as "the Green Ghost" in initial merchandise for The Real Ghostbusters. When the cartoon series was produced, and in response to the name much given to the character by audiences, the writers renamed the green ghost "Slimer", and the name stuck on all subsequent Ghostbusters properties, including Ghostbusters II and Ghostbusters: Answer the Call, despite the character never actually being referred to as Slimer within either film. Although Slimer was referred to as "The Green Ghost" early in the related toy line, in later releases of his first figure, an extra label was applied, specifying "Known as 'Slimer' in the Real Ghostbusters TV show".

In the in-narrative explanation for The Real Ghostbusters Slimer's name was revealed in the eleventh episode of The Real Ghostbusters, "Citizen Ghost" (first broadcast on November 22, 1986). A flashback depicting how the Ghostbusters made friends with Slimer reveals the ghost was so nicknamed by Ray Stantz.

In Ghostbusters: The Video Game, according to its Tobin's Spirit Guide, Stantz named the green ghost Slimer to annoy Venkman, who still nurses a grudge against the creature.

== Character ==
Throughout the first film, Slimer appears to lack intelligence, only caring about gaining food to eat (such as hot dogs). In the second movie, Slimer appears fatter and more intelligent and could drive a bus, and in The Real Ghostbusters, showing compassion from Ray Stantz, and kissing Janine, though always annoying and teasing Peter Venkman (who sometimes nicknames him "Spud").

The character's origins have been described variously across licensed media. Aykroyd described Slimer as "a confluence of psychic energy" rather than the undead soul of any individual. The Marvel UK comic book The Real Ghostbusters #22, non-canonical to the film or animated television series, explained that he was King Remils ("Slimer" backwards), an obese king who died of heart failure. In Erik Burnham's Tobin's Spirit Guide, it is believed by the Ghostbusters that Slimer was conjured by the Sedgewick Hotel's owner Godfrey M. Sedgewick (who was one of Ivo Shandor's disciples) in the early 1920s after a rite went awry.

The 2016 reboot features a different incarnation of Slimer, who savages a hot dog cart and, after an attack by the Ghostbusters, steals the Ecto-1 to go on a joyride with his girlfriend, Lady Slimer, and other ghosts. A deleted scene from the film was meant to expand on Slimer's rebooted continuity origins: when he was alive, Slimer was a gangster who killed a restaurant waiter that got his order incorrect, resulting in his imprisonment and execution. After his death, the Ghostbusters encounter him haunting the same restaurant, but due to the experimental nature of their equipment, they inadvertently disfigure him, destroying his legs and turning him green, before he escapes.

== Appearances ==
=== Film ===
==== Original continuity ====
===== Ghostbusters (1984) =====
One of the original Slimer costumes, used during the filming of the film Ghostbusters (1984).

Voiced by Ivan Reitman, Slimer (not named until The Real Ghostbusters) was a legendary ghost to all on the original staff of the Sedgewick Hotel. His usual territory was the twelfth floor, but his outings were usually non-violent and simply involved gorging himself on food from room service carts. As a result, the hotel was able to keep a lid on the supernatural problems for a while. For some reason, Gozer's approaching time of arrival provoked Slimer (and many other ghosts) into being much more active than usual. Eventually, the staff could no longer keep the ghost a secret and called the Ghostbusters. However, the team had not yet fully tested their equipment and were not completely prepared for a full capture. Ray Stantz attempted to hold Slimer by himself, but the ghost escaped through a wall, charged at Peter Venkman, and covered him in ectoplasmic residue.

Slimer fled into the hotel's Alhambra Ballroom, where the Ghostbusters successfully caught and trapped him after causing extensive property damage. Stantz loaded him into the team's storage facility as a demonstration for Winston Zeddemore after the latter was hired to work for them. He and all the other captured ghosts were released when Walter Peck ordered the facility to be shut down. Slimer took refuge in a hot dog cart soon afterward, surprising the vendor greatly upon opening it. After the defeat of Gozer, the film's closing credits begin over scenes of the Ghostbusters being celebrated by the citizens of New York City. The last shot of the film is Slimer flying towards the screen, after which the film cuts to black, and the remainder of the credits roll.

===== Ghostbusters II (1989) =====
Robin Shelby as Slimer, costumed for the filming of the film Ghostbusters II (1989).

Again voiced by Ivan Reitman, and now officially known as Slimer (due to the popularity of The Real Ghostbusters), Slimer first appears in Ghostbusters II when Louis Tully caught Slimer eating his lunch, to which the two of them fled in fear from one another. In a deleted scene set between the scene with Dana's bathtub and the scene with Dana and Venkman going out for dinner (mentioned in the novelization), Louis attempts to catch Slimer using a Proton Pack by baiting him with fried chicken.

Later in the film, on New Year's Eve, Louis decides to take up a Proton Pack and help the Ghostbusters. In an attempt to patch up their initial misunderstanding, Slimer helped an exhausted Louis by giving him a ride to the Manhattan Museum of Art (to which Louis wonders how he got a license to drive a bus).

==== Ghostbusters (2016) ====
Slimer appears in the 2016 film Ghostbusters: Answer the Call, voiced by Adam Ray and puppeteered by Ronald Binion (who fit into the character suit) and Rick Lazzarini (who operated his facial controls). After Rowan North unleashes an army of ghosts upon New York City, the Ghostbusters see a green glow coming from a hot dog stand, and find Slimer inside. Slimer promptly hijacks the Ecto-1 and rides off. The Ghostbusters are unable to stop him. Slimer is later seen driving the Ecto-1 around New York City and several of his ghostly friends. While the original Slimer was created as an androgynous blob with no gender-defining characteristics, Ghostbusters: Answer the Call introduces a female "Lady Slimer" character with red lipstick and a bow tie in her blonde hair (voiced by Ghostbusters II's Slimer suit puppeteer Robin Shelby). The Ghostbusters later cause both Slimers to crash the Ecto-1 into the portal to cause "Total Protonic Reversal" and close the portal.

Slimer's role as the first ghost the Ghostbusters busted was fulfilled by a gargoyle-like spirit, Mayhem, at the Stonebrook Theatre. It even has the same color as Slimer's.

==== Ghostbusters: Frozen Empire (2024) ====
In December 2023, it was revealed that Slimer was set to appear in the 2024 film, Ghostbusters: Frozen Empire. In the movie, Slimer is squatting in the attic of the firehouse, living in a mound of discarded candy and snack food wrappers, his slime occasionally leaking into the bedrooms below. Trevor Spengler discovers him there and tries to catch him, but fails. At the climax of the movie, after the Possessor tries and fails to kill Trevor using Lucky Domingo's proton pack, it flees and takes possession of a pizza; Slimer quickly appears and devours it, accidentally ending that threat.

In the film, Slimer, puppeteered by Kevin Mangold, is exactly as he appeared in Ghostbusters (1984) as a mean, green, gluttonous, ugly "Onionhead" spud; the costume was made from the same molds used during the filming of the first film, ignoring the looks from the films Ghostbusters II (1989), Ghostbusters (2016), and the animated television series The Real Ghostbusters (1986–1991).

=== Television ===
==== The Real Ghostbusters ====
After the Ghostbusters stopped Gozer, they began rebuilding their Firehouse. During this process, the green ghost from the Sedgewick Hotel secretly observed them. Once the Firehouse was fully restored, a celebratory dinner was held. The ghost made himself known and attempted to steal the food. Janine Melnitz speculated the ghost was lonely and the Ghostbusters were the first humans to pay him any attention. The Ghostbusters dismissed her theory. Over the next few months, they occasionally saw Slimer.

Ray Stantz took a liking to the ghost and named him "Slimer" to annoy Venkman. When the Ghostbusters were attacked by their ghostly Doppelgängers, Slimer distracted the entities long enough for them to be drained of their energy. The Ghostbusters were then able to overpower and trap them. The Ghostbusters agreed to adopt Slimer from then on. For an official statement to the press given by Venkman, Slimer is allowed to freely roam for "scientific research being conducted".

===== Slimer! and The Real Ghostbusters =====
In 1988, Slimer got his own cartoon series primarily aimed at young children. Unlike the previous series, Slimer was able to talk very well. Many episodes of Slimer! had little to do with the Ghostbusters franchise, simply being about everyday events for Slimer. Like in the first film, he still haunts the Sedgewick Hotel, visiting it in many episodes as a visiting pest.

Slimer was given personal enemies in the show, such as an eccentric scientist named Professor Dweeb who wanted to capture Slimer in order to study him, an alley cat named Manx, a dog named Bruiser, and two ghosts named Goolem and Zugg.

==== Extreme Ghostbusters ====
After the dissolution of the Ghostbusters, Slimer stayed with Egon Spengler as he watched over the Containment Unit in the Ghostbusters Firehouse. In 1997, when there was a sudden surge in supernatural activity, Slimer flew to Egon's class to inform him of the bad news. After the formation of the "Extreme Ghostbusters", Slimer joined them in their cases.

Slimer's appearance was slightly different from the previous series, as he had a ghostly tail and a slightly bigger face, which was less compacted than the previous series. Unlike the version of Slimer from The Real Ghostbusters and Ghostbusters II, this version acted much like the version from the original Ghostbusters. Slimer's voice was noticeably higher in pitch than in The Real Ghostbusters, because he was voiced by Billy West, instead of Frank Welker, who reprised his role as Ray in the two-part series finale "Back in the Saddle".

==== Cartoon All-Stars to the Rescue ====
Slimer, as he appeared in The Real Ghostbusters, is among the various cartoon characters who help the main character Michael turn away from drugs.

=== Video games ===
==== Ghostbusters: The Video Game ====
At one point, Slimer was recaptured and kept in a Paranormal Containment Research Tank in the Firehouse in the lobby. Egon Spengler is said to have used him for various paranormal studies and the Tobin's Spirit Guide reveals that Ray named Slimer out of mockery to Peter (nods to the take on Slimer in The Real Ghostbusters). Ray, however, occasionally referred to the green ghost Onionhead or Spud. Slimer, along with the other ghost that had also haunted the hotel, Arbison Morguncher (the Sloth Ghost), is gluttonous. The specters of Evelyn "The Spider-Witch" Lewis, fisherman and restaurateur Enzo "Pappy" Sargassi, and some bellhop and guest ghosts also reside the hotel with them. Thanksgiving weekend 1991, Slimer was playing with Peter Venkman's ESP cards inside the Paranormal Containment Research Tank.

The Psi Energy Pulse damaged the Tank and Slimer escaped. The team finds him looking at the Containment Unit. When the Rookie takes a shot, Slimer avoids it and the Proton Stream hits the Unit, releasing the Sloth Ghost. Rookie and Ray pursued Slimer into the Sub-Basement but it escaped through a wall. After the Sloth Ghost was recaptured, the Ghostbusters headed to the Sedgewick Hotel on Ray's hunch Slimer would return to his old haunt. Sure enough, Slimer was found by Ray, Peter, and Rookie eating and drinking off someone's tray in front of Room 1218. The rookie took a shot but Slimer ran for it and tried to hide. Rookie roused him out and Slimer flew off towards the elevators where he descended back to the ground floor (but not before sliming Peter for a second time). Slimer is joined by Bellhop Ghosts. With renewed paranormal activity, Egon opts to split up. Rookie and Peter are tasked with recapturing Slimer. Peter believes he's feasting in the Alhambra Ballroom but the manager John O'Keefe bars entrance. Peter regroups and leads Rookie through the kitchen to access the other entrance to the ballroom. Rookie and Peter successfully trap Slimer.

Slimer is placed back into a working Paranormal Containment Research Tank when the team returns from Times Square. When Ivo Shandor and his Gozarian cultists shut down the containment grid, Slimer is among the escapees. After the Ghostbusters destroy Shandor and return to the physical plane, Slimer slimes Ilyssa Selwyn just as she and Peter are about to kiss in Central Park. In the stylized version of the game, Slimer flies around, on the loose once again, as the Rookie fires on him during the credits.

==== Beeline's Ghostbusters ====
Slimer appears in Beeline's Ghostbusters game for iOS. The game was released on January 24, 2013. Slimer's role in the game is that Slimer escapes the Containment Unit and floats around the Ghostbusters Firehouse. The player can tap on him for a daily reward, which increases in value if the player is consistent.

==== Lego Dimensions ====
Slimer appears as a playable character in Lego Dimensions, packaged with the "Slime Shooter" vehicle, with Frank Welker reprising his voice role. He makes cameo appearances in the main campaign, causing trouble for the heroes, while a bonus level adapting the first film recreates his original encounter with the Ghostbusters in the Sedgewick Hotel. He also appears as a quest-giver in the Ghostbusters adventure world. He appears once again as part of the Ghostbusters (2016) Story Pack, recreating his role in the events of the rebooted film's story.

== In other media ==
- Slimer makes an appearance of RadioShack’s “the Phone Call” 2014 Super Bowl commercial, with Tom Spina Designs, Inc.'s digital artist Tyler Ham faithfully recreated the character's "Onionhead" looks from the original film through the use of CGI.
- Slimer makes an appearance in a 2019 Walmart commercial. He was seen eating bags of groceries in the trunk of the Ecto-1.
- Slimer appeared alongside Janine Melnitz in a series of commercials for Quickbooks.
- He appeared in commercials for Hi-C Ecto-Cooler in 1987 to promote The Real Ghostbusters.

== See also ==
- Doop (character), a Marvel Comics character similar to Slimer

== Works cited ==
- McCabe, Joseph (2016). "Making Magic". The Complete SFX Guide to Ghostbusters. United Kingdom.
- Waddell, Callum (2016). "Slimer Designer". The Complete SFX Guide to Ghostbusters. United Kingdom.
