= Peter Venkman =

Fictional character from Ghostbusters

- Ghostbusters character
- Dr. Peter Venkman as portrayed by Bill Murray in the film Ghostbusters (1984)
- First appearance: Ghostbusters (1984)
- Created by: Dan Aykroyd; Harold Ramis
- Portrayed by: Bill Murray
- Voiced by: Bill Murray (Ghostbusters: The Video Game, Lego Dimensions); Lorenzo Music (The Real Ghostbusters, 1986–1987); Dave Coulier (The Real Ghostbusters, 1988–1991; Extreme Ghostbusters guest star)
- Created for: John Belushi

In-universe information
- Title: Doctor
- Occupation: Scientist; Ghostbuster
- Spouse: Dana Barrett (wife)
- Children: Oscar (stepson)
- Nationality: American

Peter Venkman, PhD is a fictional character from the Ghostbusters franchise. He appears in the films Ghostbusters, Ghostbusters II, Ghostbusters: Afterlife, Ghostbusters: Frozen Empire and in the animated television series The Real Ghostbusters and Extreme Ghostbusters. In those four live action films, he was portrayed by Bill Murray, and was voiced in the animated series first by Lorenzo Music and then by Dave Coulier. Dan Aykroyd originally wrote the script with John Belushi in mind to play the role of Peter but Belushi died of a drug overdose on March 5, 1982, leading Murray to get the role. Peter is a parapsychologist, initially a skeptic on the paranormal despite being a scientist on the subject, and the leader of the Ghostbusters.

In 2008, Peter Venkman was selected by the magazine Empire as one of The 100 Greatest Movie Characters of All Time, described by Empire's Nick de Semlyen as "the ultimate New York hero: cynical, sarcastic, secretly sweet-natured", "a man possessed by manic spontaneity, with a wont to twirl in circles around a public concourse or declare undying love for a woman he's just met", and the "most popular" character played by Murray.

== Character ==
Born and raised in Brooklyn, New York, Peter Venkman is one of three professors of parapsychology on the Ghostbusters team. He holds Ph.D.s in both parapsychology and psychology, though he rarely uses his scientific prowess (despite what he had learned in fields like metallurgy, engineering, and physics), and the papers of his research at Columbia University are sloppily written and spurious, leading people to doubt whether he was a legitimate scientist. Though never shown in the films, his dialogue implies that he reads erotic magazines like Playboy and Penthouse and watches pornographic films, and a poster of Marilyn Monroe taped on the wall of the laboratory he shared with Egon Spengler and Ray Stantz at the university likely belonged to him. Originally his professional interests were focused on paranormal phenomena like ESP; he appeared not to believe in ghosts until he actually saw one. In the movies, he is characterized by his flippant persona, his approach to his profession as a scientific charlatan, and his womanizing demeanor. Fred Pfeil sees in him a postmodern hero, whose level of "crass self-interest" safeguards him from being ensnared by a stereotypical role.

Despite Peter's lackadaisical attitude, he has developed plans that help the Ghostbusters save the day, and he is shrewd and more street smart than the more academically inclined Ray and Egon. Peter serves as the front man and leader for the group and possesses more social ability than his friends. For instance, he persuades the city mayor to release them after being arrested, return their equipment, and otherwise support their attempt to stop Gozer the Gozerian. In addition, Peter uses a combination of his social skills and psychology/parapsychology knowledge (presumably) to assist the Ghostbusters during their climatic battles in Ghostbusters, Ghostbusters II, and Ghostbusters: Afterlife. Specifically, he informs his fellow Ghostbusters the intentions of Gozer when they are asked to choose the form of the destructor during the climax of the first film as well as distract Vigo the Carpathian and Gozer during the climax of the second film and Ghostbusters: Afterlife, respectively.

== Appearances ==
=== Film ===
==== Ghostbusters (1984) ====
Peter Venkman was a professor working with Egon Spengler and Ray Stantz at Columbia University. The trio were researching the supernatural but, unlike his partners, Peter was not as enthusiastic about the topic. On campus, he attempts to seduce female students despite risking his reputation and academic career. Despite having a passing interest in ESP, he appears not to have believed in ghosts until witnessing one personally. The team of three discovered the librarian ghost, but were unable to catch and show her off to the public. Subsequently, their funding was cut and they were fired from their university positions, though Peter seemed happy to look for new opportunities. After being fired, the three of them decided to build some advanced paranormal equipment and go into a career of freelance ghost catching.

Peter encouraged and prodded Ray to mortgage his house in order to find the capital needed to purchase the firehouse. Whether motivated by the prospect of becoming rich or just the fact that he no longer had to work under the thumb of the board of regents, Dr. Venkman was very motivated to begin a new career. Peter soon became the first to meet the company's first client, Dana Barrett, and formed a romantic interest. Dana had claimed that there were monsters in her fridge even though Peter could not find any such thing. After that incident, Peter, Egon, and Ray were eating dinner at the firehouse when their secretary Janine got a call. Peter and his team came to the Sedgewick Hotel, where Peter came face to face with the ghost that would one day become known as Slimer. Peter was slimed during his first encounter with the ghost, which Ray greatly praised as "actual physical contact." Peter and his team eventually captured the ghost, which soon made them popular and busy around town with other ghosts.

Peter had stopped by at one of her orchestra rehearsals. He happened upon her talking to a colleague who played in the orchestra with her, and who was interested her as well. He asked, "Who's the stiff?" and she answers, "The stiff happens to be one of the finest musicians in the world." Peter has found some answers for Dana, but say they can find out more on another night. Peter continues to compliment and flirt in confidence and Dana reluctantly says, trying to keep down a commotion, "I'll see you Thursday." He says, "We'll eat and read." As she walks away with her male colleague, he addresses her somewhat jealously, "So, who the hell is that?!" and Dana replies, "A friend. An old friend." She smiled because of Peter constantly complimenting her appearance and now stating that in front of her male colleague.

Not too long afterwards, Janine is overrun with calls and stressed out. She tells Peter there is a man waiting in his office from the EPA and she has been working two weeks without a break and states that he promised he would hire more help. He sarcastically praises her experiences in order to let her know the door is open for her to discover more opportunities if she is unsatisfied with working for him. As the phone is ringing once more, Peter replies to her, "Are you going to answer that?". Peter soon meets an EPA representative named Walter Peck, who becomes angry when Peter refuses to show him the storage facility.

As Peter was coming to see Dana and take her out on a date, he notices that she has undergone a radical change in appearance and is now acting very strangely. She bars entrance to her apartment, asking him if he is "The Keymaster". After getting the door slammed in his face he tricked her in order to gain entry. Once inside Dana refers to herself as Zuul, "The Gatekeeper" and tells Peter she is awaiting the coming of Gozer, "The Destructor". Peter replies, "Oh..." and notices slime seeping through the kitchen door and furniture.

The possessed Dana quickly leads Peter to the bedroom where she tries to seduce him asking him "Do you want this body?" He replies by asking if it is a trick question. The possessed Dana is unrelenting in her attempted seduction, telling Peter "Take me now, subcreature." Peter ignores her and Dana slams him onto her bed, pouncing on him and pinning him to the bed with supernatural strength. She passionately kisses him and rolls him over on top of her, telling him "I want you inside me". Peter tells her she apparently has two people inside of her already. Peter then attempts to try to talk to the real Dana Barrett, ignoring her seductive advances in the process. While asking for Dana she replies in an inhuman growling voice that "There is no Dana, only Zuul". Peter gives Zuul to the count of three to leave Dana's body, to which she responds by turning her eyes white, thrashing her head back and forth on her bed, then growling furiously like a beast, and levitating above her bed. Peter, realizing the seriousness of Dana's condition, sedates her and calls Egon to explain what is going on. He soon learns from Egon that her building was renovated by an evil architect named Ivo Shandor, and she is possessed by Zuul, the Gatekeeper of Gozer.

After Peck returns and shut down the Containment Unit, the ghosts all escape, and Peter and the other Ghostbusters are imprisoned for EPA violations. Peter convinces the mayor that an apocalypse of "Biblical proportions," is coming to destroy the city.

The Ghostbusters are released and go toward Dana's building, escorted there by a police and army motorcade as a dark cloud starts to cover the entire city. After an earthquake strikes, nearly trapping them in rubble, the Ghostbusters made it to the top of the building. However they are too late to stop Dana and Louis Tully from releasing the evil Gozer and transforming into their possessors' Terror Dog forms. The Ghostbusters confronted Gozer, who electrocutes them before being zapped by their proton packs. He vanishes and returns in the form of the Stay Puft Marshmallow Man (which Ray had been thinking of). Peter and his team then cross their proton streams, and force the door to Gozer's dimension to close, destroying the Marshmallow Man in a blaze of flames and saving the city. Peter rescues Dana, no longer possessed, from the rubble of Zuul's charred body, finally winning her affections for saving her.

==== Ghostbusters II (1989) ====
Despite saving the city from Gozer, the Ghostbusters were put out of business due to being sued for the damage done during the battle. Also, Peter and Dana's relationship faltered due to his fear of commitment and taking her for granted. She left Peter for her male colleague in the orchestra, married him and had a son, Oscar. However, he unexpectedly "ditched" her for an opportunity, leaving Dana and Oscar behind.

In the five years since, Egon described Peter (even to Dana) as being borderline(-manic) until he eventually "crossed the border." Peter became the host of a psychic reality talk show in the years after the Gozer battle. The Ghostbusters go to Dana's aid after she claimed her baby stroller rolled away from her by itself, and pinpoints that there was "something brewing under the street," of First Avenue. Egon, Peter, and Ray dig under the surface of the road where they discover a river of slime. The three Ghostbusters are summoned to court after causing a city-wide blackout, where they stand trial on the grounds of violating a restraining order and destroying a section of First Avenue. They go back into business after the slime sample in the courtroom absorbed the judge's negative energy while shouting and exploded out two ghosts; the Scoleri Brothers. After the judge rescinded the order and dismissed the case (while under duress from the ghosts), the Ghostbusters were allowed to put on their equipment and bust the ghosts, declaring to the public afterwards that they were open for business once again. While his teammates investigate the river of slime underneath the city, Peter renews his relationship with Dana and becomes paternally attached to Oscar despite not being his father. When Oscar is targeted by the ghost of Vigo the Carpathian, Peter and the team defeat Vigo and save both Dana and Oscar in a final battle at the Manhattan Museum of Art, saving the city once again.

In court, Peter implied that two years prior to the film's events, the team secretly had violated the judiciary orders against them and used their proton packs. During the confrontation with Vigo, even when paralyzed, Peter's tongue was still as sharp as ever and he still managed to provoke Vigo's ire with a variety of pointed insults, including referring to him as a "dumb blond".

==== Ghostbusters: Afterlife (2021) ====
Murray reprised his role as Peter in Ghostbusters: Afterlife (2021).

In Ghostbusters: Afterlife, after the closure of the Ghostbusters business following Egon's theft of the Ecto-1 and the majority of their equipment, Peter returned to teaching at SUNY Cortland, becoming a Professor of Advertising, indicating that he has earned an advanced degree in business education and marketing. He, Ray and Winston arrive in Summerville, Oklahoma during a new Crossrip incident to aid Egon's family in stopping Gozer. After Gozer's defeat, Peter praises Egon's granddaughter Phoebe for her fighting Gozer herself before they joined her, acknowledging her as a Ghostbuster. After Peter returns to Cortland, he reunites with Dana Barrett who has since become his wife, as indicated by the wedding rings they are wearing. Dana submits him to the same ESP test that he once used on his parapsychology students, hooking him up to the shock machine to playfully torture him, especially after Dana caught him cheating the test and he lets slip that he only shocked men (not women) with it.

==== Ghostbusters: Frozen Empire (2024) ====
Murray again reprises his role as Peter in the 2024 film, Ghostbusters: Frozen Empire. In the film, in a rare occasion, Peter actually uses his scientific prowess, when he evaluates Nadeem Razmaadi (Kumail Nanjiani) and determined that he has pyrokinetic powers. He later joined his fellow Ghostbusters in the climactic fight against Garraka. with the original Ghostbusters team playing a pivotal role by opening the containment unit to capture the death-chilling deity.

=== Television ===
==== The Real Ghostbusters ====
In The Real Ghostbusters series, Peter's womanizing is toned down somewhat (though he is still quick to approach attractive women), but he retains his quick wit and cynical demeanor, and his arrogance is played up more. While not the official leader of the group, Peter is the closest thing they have to one, and often makes the decision whether the Ghostbusters will take a case or not. He often reinforces the prospect of Ghostbusters being a business and, with rare exceptions, opposes ghostbusting without the promise of equity. He is originally opposed to the idea of Slimer living in the firehouse, but quickly develops a love–hate relationship with the ghost; mostly hate whenever he is "slimed" on an episodic basis.

The episodes "Venkman's Ghost Repellers", "Cold Cash and Hot Water", and "Treasure of the Sierra Tamale" feature Peter's father, a con artist/businessman who could not make an honest dollar and was often away on business during Peter's childhood, as mentioned in "X-mas Marks The Spot". He is depicted as a selfish, even obnoxious father; his relationship with Peter is estranged. Peter has claimed to be a Scorpio, as mentioned in "Mean Green Teen Machine". In "Last Train to Oblivion", one of Peter's favorite hobbies is trains, and he used to dream about driving a big locomotive when he was a child (Peter even studied engineering in college for two years before discovering it had nothing to do with trains). Peter Venkman was voiced by Lorenzo Music during the first two seasons. After season 2 was completed, Bill Murray complained to the studio that the character sounded too much like Garfield the cat (who was also voiced by Music and Murray went on to voice Garfield in the 2004 live-action film and its 2006 sequel) and requested a change. The studio brought in Full House star and America's Funniest People co-host Dave Coulier to replace Music for the third season. According to Couiler, he wasn't trying to impersonate Bill Murray or Lorenzo Music but rather come up with his own style of voice for the character.

==== Extreme Ghostbusters ====
Peter only appears in the two-part series finale. After the closing down of the Ghostbusters, Peter went to Hollywood and tried to sell an idea for a Ghostbusters movie, but never got it going because he was waiting for Brad Pitt to become available to portray him.

The Ghostbusters in Extreme Ghostbusters keep a statue of Peter Venkman, complete with uniform and working original Proton Pack, in the Ghostbusters Firehouse.

=== Video games ===
==== Ghostbusters II (NES) ====
Peter was featured as a playable character in Ghostbusters II for NES.

==== New Ghostbusters 2 ====
Peter was featured as a playable character in New Ghostbusters 2 for NES and Game Boy.

==== Ghostbusters: The Video Game ====
Venkman shows some initial distrust when Ray and Egon hire the Rookie, jealous that he gets issued new equipment and gets a 'title'. However, upon Egon and Ray explaining to Peter that the equipment the Rookie is issued is "highly experimental and, if not handled properly, could blow the user clear into New Jersey," Peter immediately lost interest in both the Rookie and his gear. Peter eventually warms up to the Rookie and occasionally praises his developing skills, but his interest is soon lost once they encountered Ilyssa Selwyn who, true to himself, he took an instant liking to. Peter flirted with her, but she was disinterested. At the end, he won her heart and shared a brief kiss with Ilyssa before she was slimed by Slimer.

Peter still maintains the smooth-talking slacker identity from the previous two movies, willing to jump at any chance to get out of doing work or going into a dangerous situation. He offers to take Marine Ecto-8 to avoid going onto Shandor Island. These attempts are transparent at best, prompting the other Ghostbusters to roll their eyes or glare at him.

Peter is primarily motivated by his own best interests. He can be goaded into expending effort if an attractive female or a lucrative payoff is involved. But in the end he will come around to doing the right thing when it's important.

==== Beeline's Ghostbusters ====
Venkman appears in Beeline's Ghostbusters game for iOS. The game was released on January 24, 2013.

==== Lego Dimensions ====
Venkman appears as a playable character in Lego Dimensions, with archival audio of Bill Murray being used to represent his character. Out of the four, Venkman is the default Ghostbuster that is selected. He also unlocks a level when you get him called “A Spook Central Adventure”, which retells the plot of the original Ghostbusters.

== Comparison ==
Bruce G. Hallenbeck, author of Comedy-Horror Films: A Chronological History, 1914–2008, compares Peter Venkman to Groucho Marx, who hosted the 1950s quiz show You Bet Your Life. Hallenback said, "With a quip for every situation, a put-down for everyone who deserves it and an ability to rise above it all, Venkman is a lot like Groucho." The comparison is also reinforced by the scene in the original movie where, waiting for Dana Barrett to finish the day's rehearsals with the orchestra, Peter jogs up and down a bustling New York square hopping on a single foot, alternately, just as Groucho Marx used to do.
