= Kevin Mangold =

American actor and horse jockey

Kevin Mangold is an American actor, stuntman, editor, producer and former horse jockey. He appeared most notable in the film Seabiscuit.

== Filmography ==
=== Film ===
Year	Title	Role	Notes
1998	Gang Land	Whino #1	
2003	Seabiscuit	Saratoga Jockey	
2011	The Mudman	Boy	
2023	The Primevals	Hominid	Filmed in 1994
2024	Ghostbusters: Frozen Empire	Slimer	

=== Television ===
Year	Title	Role	Notes
1986	Silver Spoons	Spike	Episode: "One for the Road: Part 1"
1995	Ellen	Bear	Episode: "The Spa"
1996	Saved by the Bell: The New Class	Orville	Episode: "Little Hero"
2012	Red Clover	Leprechaun	Television film
2012	BlackBoxTV Presents	Bear Suit	Episode: "Silverwood: Kidnapped"
2017	Wet Hot American Summer: Ten Years Later	Arrow Hit Camper	Episode: "Softball"
2021	The Rookie	Ken Haverfield	Episode: "Red Hot"
