= Ghostbusters: Frozen Empire =

2024 film by Gil Kenan

- Theatrical release poster
- Directed by: Gil Kenan
- Written by: Gil Kenan; Jason Reitman
- Based on: Ghostbusters by: Dan Aykroyd; Harold Ramis
- Produced by: Ivan Reitman (Note: Although Reitman died in 2022, he received a posthumous producer credit on the film.); Jason Reitman; Jason Blumenfeld
- Starring: Paul Rudd; Carrie Coon; Finn Wolfhard; Mckenna Grace; Kumail Nanjiani; Patton Oswalt; James Acaster; Bill Murray; Dan Aykroyd; Ernie Hudson; Annie Potts; William Atherton
- Cinematography: Eric Steelberg
- Edited by: Nathan Orloff; Shane Reid
- Music by: Dario Marianelli
- Production companies: Columbia Pictures; Ghost Corps; Right of Way Films
- Distributed by: Sony Pictures Releasing
- Release dates: March 14, 2024 (AMC Lincoln Square Theater); March 22, 2024 (United States)
- Running time: 115 minutes
- Country: United States
- Language: English
- Budget: $100 million
- Box office: $202 million

Ghostbusters: Frozen Empire is a 2024 American supernatural comedy film directed by Gil Kenan, who co-wrote it with Jason Reitman. It is the sequel to Ghostbusters: Afterlife (2021) and is the fourth mainline installment and the fifth overall in the Ghostbusters franchise. The film stars Paul Rudd, Carrie Coon, Finn Wolfhard, Mckenna Grace, Ernie Hudson and Annie Potts reprising their roles from the previous films, joined by new additions Kumail Nanjiani and Patton Oswalt. It sees the veteran Ghostbusters returning to New York City and collaborating with their successors to save the world again from a new ancient evil.

Following the success of Afterlife, Sony Pictures announced a sequel in April 2022 with Reitman returning to direct. In December, co-writer and executive producer Kenan took over as director, with Reitman remaining as co-writer and co-producer. That same month, Rudd, Coon, Wolfhard, Grace, Hudson, Potts, Bill Murray and Dan Aykroyd were all confirmed to reprise their roles. New cast members, including Nanjiani and Oswalt, were announced in March 2023, with principal photography commencing that month and wrapping in June as Dario Marianelli composed the film's score. It is the first film of the franchise to be released following the death of co-creator and Reitman's father Ivan, who posthumously receives a producer credit, and the film is dedicated to his memory.

Ghostbusters: Frozen Empire premiered at the AMC Lincoln Square Theater in New York City on March 14, 2024 and was released in the United States on March 22 by Sony Pictures Releasing. The film received mixed reviews from critics and grossed $202 million on a budget of $100 million.

== Plot ==
Three years after the Summerville incident, (Note: As depicted in Ghostbusters: Afterlife (2021)) Callie Spengler, her boyfriend Gary Grooberson, her children Trevor and Phoebe and their friends Lucky Domingo and Podcast, relocate to New York City to aid Winston Zeddemore and Ray Stantz in re-establishing the Ghostbusters. Following the team's most-recent ghost capture, Walter Peck, the Ghostbusters' long-time opponent and current mayor, threatens to put them out of business for good. To appease him, Callie removes Phoebe from the team for being underage. Upset, Phoebe plays chess in a nearby park, where she encounters and befriends Melody, the ghost of a teenager killed in a fire.

Ray and Podcast collect cursed objects for examination. Nadeem Razmaadi sells them a strange brass orb with ritual markings written in Mesopotamian Arabic. Knowing that copper-based alloys have long been believed to be spiritually conductive, Ray concludes that the orb is an apotropaic trap meant to contain a powerful entity. When Ray evaluates the orb's psychokinetic energy levels, it emits a broad-spectrum psionic burst. A cold wave travels from the orb to the Ghostbusters' firehouse headquarters and damages the containment unit, which is almost at full capacity.

Winston takes the orb to his company's paranormal research and development center, run by Doctor Lars Pinfield. Using an experimental device, he is unable to extract any orenda from it. The orb's captive psychically sabotages one of the center's confinements, allowing a "Possessor" ghost to escape and hide in Podcast's equipment. To learn more, Lars joins Trevor and Lucky to see Nadeem, who reveals that his grandmother kept the orb hidden within a brass-lined chamber. Peter Venkman, brought in to help, discovers Nadeem has latent pyrokinesis.

Ray takes Phoebe and Podcast to visit Doctor Hubert Wartzki, a research librarian and anthropologist at the New York Public Library, who explains that the orb was invented over four thousand years ago in West Asia by sorcerers known as the Firemasters. It was intended to imprison Garraka, a demigod who sought to conquer humanity by inflicting fear powerful enough to freeze living creatures to death. Garraka's vulnerability to fire and brass, coupled with the removal of his horns, allowed the Firemasters to trap him within the orb. Nadeem's grandmother was of the Firemasters' lineage and prevented Garraka from escaping in 1904 after he murdered the members of the Manhattan Adventurers' Society, who were conducting a mock ritual to free him.

When the trio attempts to stop the escaped Possessor from stealing a phonographic recording of the society's ritual, Peck exploits Phoebe's involvement to condemn the Ghostbusters' headquarters and confiscate their equipment. After an argument with Gary and her mother, Phoebe runs away and takes Melody to Winston's research center, where she uses his extraction equipment to project herself as a ghost for two minutes so she can physically interact with Melody. However, Melody reveals she has been secretly collaborating with Garraka, who has offered her passage to the afterlife. By controlling Phoebe's disembodied spirit, Garraka forces her physical body to recite the ritual chant. He then escapes, recovers his removed horns at Nadeem's residence and begins terrorizing the city. Knowing Garraka will liberate the ghosts in the containment unit after freeing the ones at the center, the Ghostbusters gather to defend their headquarters. They are aided by Nadeem, who dons the brass Firemaster armor kept by his grandmother and attempts to master his powers.

Garraka overpowers them and breaches the containment unit, but Phoebe electroplates her proton pack with brass to strengthen it and confronts him; Melody atones for her misdeeds by helping Nadeem utilize his powers to weaken Garraka. Ray, with help from his fellow veteran Ghostbusters including Janine Melnitz, reconfigures the containment unit to serve as a greater ghost trap and defeat Garraka. A passage is opened for Melody and she reconciles with Phoebe before departing for the afterlife to reunite with her family. With the city saved, the Ghostbusters are hailed as heroes again, with Peck forced to support the team and reinstate Phoebe, before pursuing the liberated ghosts, including Slimer and the Mini-Pufts.

== Cast ==
- Paul Rudd as Gary Grooberson
- Carrie Coon as Callie Spengler
- Finn Wolfhard as Trevor Spengler
- Mckenna Grace as Phoebe Spengler
- Kumail Nanjiani as Nadeem Razmaadi
- Patton Oswalt as Doctor Hubert Wartzki
- Celeste O'Connor as Lucky Domingo
- Logan Kim as Podcast
- Emily Alyn Lind as Melody
- James Acaster as Doctor Lars Pinfield
- Bill Murray as Peter Venkman
- Dan Aykroyd as Ray Stantz
- Ernie Hudson as Winston Zeddemore
- Annie Potts as Janine Melnitz
- William Atherton as Walter Peck

Additionally, Kevin Mangold and Ian Whyte serve as the puppeteers for both Slimer and Garraka, respectively, though the latter's voice performers were uncredited. Shelby Young and Ryan Bartley additionally appear, uncredited, as the vocal effects of the Mini-Pufts, miniature doppelgängers of the Stay Puft Marshmallow Man, with Young returning from Afterlife. John Rothman cameos as New York Public Library administrator Roger Delacorte, reprising his role from the first film.

== Production ==
=== Development ===
Following the release of Ghostbusters: Afterlife in November 2021, Dan Aykroyd expressed interest in having the surviving cast of the original Ghostbusters team reprise their roles in up to three sequels. In April 2022, it was announced that a sequel to Afterlife was in early development at Sony Pictures.

In June 2022, the film was confirmed by director Jason Reitman under the working title Firehouse. That same month, it was announced that the sequel would take place in New York City. On October 5, 2022, Mckenna Grace announced that she would reprise her role. The following month, Ernie Hudson revealed he had read a script for the film.

In December 2022, it was announced that Gil Kenan would take over as director from Reitman, who remained as a writer and producer. It was also announced that Paul Rudd, Finn Wolfhard and Carrie Coon would return. In March 2023, it was announced that Kumail Nanjiani, Patton Oswalt, James Acaster and Emily Alyn Lind had been cast in the film. Lind's role was established in secrecy during pre-production. She met Reitman, Kenan, and casting director John Papsidera, and was not aware that she had the role until shortly before filming.

According to Nanjiani, the filmmakers drew inspiration from the animated series The Real Ghostbusters (1986–1991), noting they "wanted to make a long episode of the animated series".

=== Filming ===
Principal photography began on March 20, 2023, in London, Winnersh Film Studios, and Shinfield Studios, under the working title Firehouse, with Eric Steelberg serving as the cinematographer. On April 25, 2023, Hudson indicated that Aykroyd, Murray and Potts would reprise their roles from previous Ghostbusters movies in the film; Aykroyd confirmed he would return for the sequel in June 2023.

Filming was spotted in New York City, where Casey Neistat was caught filming a stunt scene in a video posted on June 7, 2023, while documenting the effects of the 2023 Canadian wildfires in New York City. Filming wrapped on June 23.

== Music ==
On January 18, 2024, Dario Marianelli was confirmed to compose the film's score, replacing Afterlife composer Rob Simonsen. This marked Marianelli's second collaboration with Kenan after A Boy Called Christmas (2021). He recorded his score on the Barbra Streisand Scoring Stage in the John Williams Music Building on the Sony Pictures Studios lot in Culver City. The original film's composer Elmer Bernstein's son, Peter Bernstein, returned as score consultant, after doing so for Afterlife. In addition to using some of the elder Bernstein's original scores on some of the film's scenes, the song "Ghostbusters", which was performed by Ray Parker Jr., is heard during the film's end credits. Other songs "Home on the Range", arranged by Kenan and Reitman, "Melano" by Caino x Jun R.O.T., and "Love Is Strange" by Mickey & Sylvia are used in the film.

On March 7, 2024, Japanese girl group Atarashii Gakko! released a track called "Ghostbusters: Frozen Summer" as a collaboration with Sony Pictures Entertainment Japan.

== Release ==
=== Theatrical ===
Ghostbusters: Frozen Empire was scheduled to be released on December 20, 2023, but was delayed due to the SAG-AFTRA strike and rescheduled for March 29, 2024 (taking over the original release date of Sony Pictures Animation's Spider-Man: Beyond the Spider-Verse). The film had its world premiere in New York City on March 14, 2024, and was released by Sony Pictures Releasing on March 22, 2024.

=== Home media ===
In April 2021, Sony signed deals with Netflix and Disney for the rights to their 2022 to 2026 film slate, following the film's theatrical and home media windows. Netflix signed for exclusive "pay 1 window" streaming rights, which is typically an 18-month window, and included Ghostbusters: Frozen Empire and past Ghostbusters films. Disney signed for "pay 2 windows" rights for the films, which would be streamed on Disney+ and/or Hulu as well as broadcast on Disney's linear television networks.

Ghostbusters: Frozen Empire was released digitally on May 7, 2024, and on 4K Blu-ray, Blu-ray, and DVD on June 25, 2024.

== Reception ==
=== Box office ===
Ghostbusters: Frozen Empire grossed $113.4 million in the United States and Canada and $88.6 million in other territories, for a worldwide total of $202 million.

In the United States and Canada, Ghostbusters: Frozen Empire was released alongside Immaculate and Late Night with the Devil, and was projected to gross $43–45 million from 4,345 theaters in its opening weekend. The film made $16 million on its first day, including $4.7 million from Thursday night previews, slightly topping Afterlife's $4.5 million. It went on to debut at $45 million, landing between the opening weekends of Ghostbusters ($46 million in 2016) and Afterlife ($44 million in 2021), topping the box office, and pushing the Ghostbusters franchise past the $1 billion mark. Deadline Hollywood credited Sony's marketing efforts for boosting the opening weekend, but suggested that the franchise would perform better if it returned to the original movie's focus on "wall-to-wall humor" and "big comedy stars." In its second weekend the film made $15.7 million (a drop of 65%), finishing second behind newcomer Godzilla x Kong: The New Empire. Ghostbusters: Frozen Empire finished in third place during its third weekend with $9 million (a drop of 42%).

=== Critical response ===
On the review aggregator website Rotten Tomatoes, 42% of 302 critics' reviews are positive, with an average rating of 5.2/10. The website's consensus reads: "Ghostbusters: Frozen Empire offers a certain amount of nostalgia-fueled fun for fans of the original, but a crowded cast and surprisingly serious tone prevent this sequel from truly sparking." It is the lowest-rated installment in the franchise on the site. Metacritic, which uses a weighted average, assigned the film a score of 46 out of 100, based on 50 critics, indicating "mixed or average" reviews. Audiences surveyed by CinemaScore gave the film an average grade of "B+" on an A+ to F scale, while those polled by PostTrak gave it an 80% overall positive score, with 64% saying they would recommend the film.

Jake Wilson of The Age gave it 2.5 out of 5 stars, writing, "Aykroyd and Grace are the soul of the thing, to whatever degree a soul exists. At this point, Aykroyd has shed any pretense of ironic distance, emerging as the mournful weirdo he surely always was." CNN's Brian Lowry called it "a very busy movie that lacks the emotional hook of its predecessor while spending too much time on the wrong characters in a way that yields a rather lifeless, chilly affair."

Richard Roeper of the Chicago Sun-Times gave the film three out of four stars, writing that it "carries the same endearingly goofy, science-nerd spirit of the first film and delivers a delightful balance of slimy ghost stuff, sharp one-liners, terrific VFX and a steady stream of callbacks to various characters, human and otherwise, from the 1984 movie." Jake Coyle of the Associated Press gave it 2.5 out of 4 stars, saying that it was "A significant upgrade from Afterlife" and "a breezier, more serviceable sequel that has a modest charm as an '80-tinged family adventure."

=== Accolades ===
Accolades received by Ghostbusters: Frozen Empire
Award	Date of ceremony	Category	Recipient(s)	Result	Ref.
Nickelodeon Kids' Choice Awards	July 13, 2024	Favorite Movie	Ghostbusters: Frozen Empire	Nominated	
Nickelodeon Kids' Choice Awards	July 13, 2024	Favorite Movie Actor	Paul Rudd	Nominated	
Saturn Awards	February 2, 2025	Best Fantasy Film	Ghostbusters: Frozen Empire	Nominated	
Saturn Awards	February 2, 2025	Best Film Costume Design	Alex Fortes & Ruth Myers	Nominated	
Saturn Awards	February 2, 2025	Best Film Music	Dario Marianelli	Nominated	
Saturn Awards	February 2, 2025	Best Younger Performer in a Film	Mckenna Grace	Nominated	

== Future ==
In February 2024, Kenan revealed that ideas for multiple future films in the Ghostbusters franchise had been discussed. Kenan specifically mentioned the Mini-Pufts storyline as something he and Reitman would like to expand upon. The Mini-Pufts are featured in the film's post-credits scene.

In October 2024, Kenan confirmed that a sequel to Frozen Empire was being developed. In November 2024, Aykroyd stated that he did not expect himself or Murray to return for any future installments, saying "I think probably they’re going to move on to advancing it beyond the originals, which they should."
