= Ruth Hale Oliver =

American astrologer and writer (1910–1988)

- Born: April 16, 1910; Philadelphia, Pennsylvania, U.S.
- Died: October 3, 1988 (aged 78); Burbank, California, U.S.
- Occupations: Astrologer, newspaper columnist, author
- Years active: 1949–1988
- Spouse: George Gercke (1931–1940; divorced)
- Children: Susan Oliver

Ruth Hale Oliver (April 16, 1910 – October 3, 1988) was an American astrologer, astrology teacher, writer, and occasional actress.

She was born in Philadelphia to L. Stauffer Oliver, an attorney (born in New Jersey) and Margaret H. Scott (born in England). She was married to George Gercke in 1931 and divorced in 1940. She died on October 3, 1988, from natural causes at the age of 78. Oliver had one child, actress Susan Oliver.

== Filmography ==
Year	Title	Role	Notes
1983	Trapper John, M.D.	Lady Runner	Episode: "The Agony of D'Feet"
1984	Ghostbusters	Library Ghost	(final film role)
2024	Ghostbusters: Frozen Empire	Library Ghost	(archival footage, posthumous release)

== Ruth Hale Oliver bibliography ==
- The Basic Principles of Astrology: A Modern View of an Ancient Science; ISBN 1-4254-8604-5 (1-4254-8604-5, softcover), Kessinger Publishing, 1962 (reprinted 2011)
- Astropsychiatry (co-author: Harry F. Darling), CSA Press, 1968 (1973 reprint); ISBN 087707111X/ISBN 9780877071112.
