= North Moore Street =

Street in Manhattan, New York

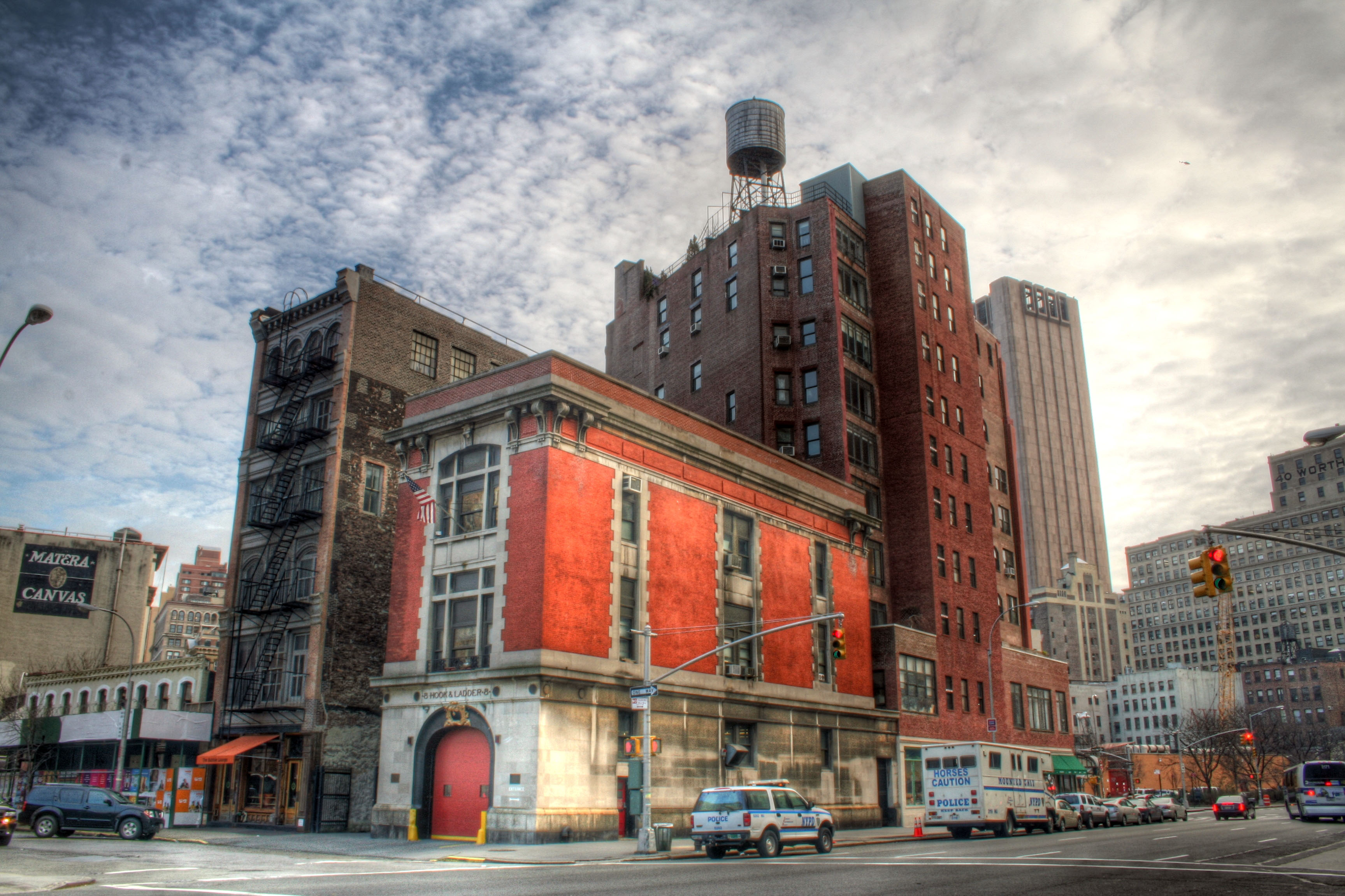
- Firehouse, Hook & Ladder Company 8 at the intersection of Varick Street and North Moore Street
- Interactive map of North Moore Street
- Namesake: Benjamin Moore
- Maintained by: New York City Department of Transportation
- Location: Tribeca, Manhattan, New York City
- Postal code: 10013
- Coordinates: 40°43′12″N 74°00′32″W
- West end: West Street
- Major junctions: Greenwich Street; Hudson Street; Varick Street
- East end: West Broadway

Construction
- Commissioned: 1790

Other
- Known for: Firehouse, Hook & Ladder Company 8

North Moore Street is a moderately trafficked street in TriBeCa, a neighborhood in the New York City borough of Manhattan. It runs roughly east–west between West Broadway and West Street. Automotive traffic is westbound only.

== Naming ==
On street signs and maps, the street is usually written as "N. Moore Street". The street was named in 1790 for Benjamin Moore (1748–1816), the second bishop of the Episcopal Diocese of New York, the president of Columbia College (now Columbia University), and the father of Clement Clarke Moore. Bishop Moore is remembered for having given Holy Communion to Alexander Hamilton on his deathbed. The addition of "North" or "N" avoids confusion with the older Moore Street, a short street near the Battery at the southern tip of Manhattan across from 1 New York Plaza.

Based on North Moore Street's abbreviation, "Nathaniel Moore Street" has been given as an incorrect name for the street. According to a 1984 article in The New York Times, some city documents around that time identified the street as "Nathaniel Moore Street". This was based on statements made by members of the local community board, even though the only notable person of that name in New York City's early history was Columbia College president Nathaniel Fish Moore (1782–1872), who would have been seven years old when North Moore Street was named. While Trinity Church records do not list a Nathaniel Moore, they did list Benjamin Moore, who was 41 years old when North Moore Street was given its name.

== Culture ==
In 1969, Fluxus artist Joe Jones opened his JJ Music Store (aka Tone Deaf Music Store) at 18 North Moore Street, where he presented his repetitive drone music machines. He created there an installation in the window so that anyone could press numerous door buttons to play the noise music machines displayed there. Jones also presented small musical installation performances there, alone or with other Fluxus artists, such as Yoko Ono and John Lennon, among others. From April 18 to June 12, 1970, Ono and Lennon (aka Plastic Ono Band) presented a series of Fluxus art events and concerts there called GRAPEFRUIT FLUXBANQUET. It was promoted with a poster designed by Fluxus leader George Maciunas. Performances included Come Impersonating John Lennon & Yoko Ono, Grapefruit Banquet (April 11–17) by George Maciunas, Yoshimasa Wada, Bici Hendricks, Geoffrey Hendricks, and Robert Watts; Do It Yourself (April 11–17) by Yoko Ono; Tickets by John Lennon + Fluxagents (April 18–24) with Wada, Ben Vautier and Maciunas; Clinic by Yoko Ono + Hi Red Center (April 25-May 1); Blue Room by Yoko + Fluxmasterliars (May 2–8); Weight & Water by Yoko + Fluxfiremen (May 9–15); Capsule by Yoko + Flux Space Center (May 16–22) with Maciunas, Paul Sharits, George Brecht, Ay-O, Ono, Watts, John Cavanaugh; Portrait of John Lennon as a Young Cloud by Yoko + Everybody (May 23–29); The Store by Yoko + Fluxfactory (May 30-June 5), with Ono, Maciunas, Wada, Ay-O; and finally Examination by Yoko + Fluxschool (June 6–12) with Ono, Geoffrey Hendricks, Watts, Mieko Shiomi and Robert Filliou. After moving out, Joe Jones's store-loft space became the art studio of No Wave artist Joseph Nechvatal, where he presented occasional Colab art events, then, in 1980, that of musician Jon Hassell, and finally that of video artist Bill Viola, before being merged into Walkers Restaurant.

Throughout the late-seventies Charlemagne Palestine performed long piano concerts regularly in his loft on North Moore Street. Since 1981, the digital art studio of Manfred Mohr has been located at 20 N. Moore.

Exterior shots of the Ghostbusters headquarters were filmed at the FDNY Hook & Ladder No. 8 firehouse, located at 14 North Moore Street, at its intersection with Varick Street. A small parking lot at the corner of West Broadway a block away was "a staging area for foam and vehicles ... [for] the classic" 1984 comedy. The interiors of the building were filmed in Fire Station No. 23 in Los Angeles.

The same W. Broadway/N. Moore corner has also been the location for the diner set of the 1994 film It Could Happen to You, a set site for Zoolander in 2001 and, in 2006, the location for a free-standing billboard advertising the animated film Enchanted.

== Notable residents ==
- John F. Kennedy Jr. (1960-1999), journalist and lawyer
- Katy Perry
- Joe Jones
- Russell Brand
- Harvey Keitel
- Joseph Nechvatal
- Lindsay Lohan
- Jon Hassell
- Ice Cube
- David Letterman
- Charlemagne Palestine
- Ed Burns
- Bill Viola
- Christy Turlington
- Nathan Lane
- Manfred Mohr
- Jackson Mac Low
- Anne Tardos
- Peter Venkman
- Egon Spengler
- Ray Stantz
- Winston Zeddemore
- Janine Melnitz
- Louis Tully
