= Egon Spengler =

Fictional character from Ghostbusters

- Ghostbusters character
- First appearance: Ghostbusters (1984)
- Last appearance: Ghostbusters: Afterlife (2021)
- Created by: Dan Aykroyd; Harold Ramis
- Portrayed by: Harold Ramis
- Voiced by: Harold Ramis (Ghostbusters: The Video Game); Maurice LaMarche (The Real Ghostbusters, Extreme Ghostbusters)
- Body doubles: Bob Gunton; Ivan Reitman

In-universe information
- Species: Human
- Gender: Male
- Title: PhD
- Occupation: Scientist; Ghostbuster
- Family: Elon Spengler (twin brother)
- Significant other: Unnamed partner (deceased)
- Children: Callie Spengler (daughter)
- Relatives: Trevor Spengler (grandson); Phoebe Spengler (granddaughter)
- Nationality: American

Egon Spengler, PhD is a fictional character from the Ghostbusters franchise. He is a member of the Ghostbusters and one of the three doctors of parapsychology, along with Dr. Peter Venkman and Dr. Ray Stantz.

Egon Spengler debuted in Ghostbusters (1984), and subsequently appeared in the films Ghostbusters II (1989) and Ghostbusters: Afterlife (2021), the animated television series The Real Ghostbusters and Extreme Ghostbusters, and in the video games Ghostbusters: The Video Game and Ghostbusters Beeline. Egon was portrayed by Harold Ramis in the films and voiced by him in Ghostbusters: The Video Game and Lego Dimensions, while voiced by Maurice LaMarche in the cartoon series.

== Creation and conception ==
The character's name, Egon Spengler, is an amalgamation of the name Egon Donsbach, who was a Hungarian refugee classmate of Ramis' at Senn High School, and the name of German polymath Oswald Spengler.

Christopher Walken, John Lithgow, Christopher Lloyd, and Jeff Goldblum were all considered for the role of Egon Spengler, before Ramis, who had gotten close to the character while writing him, felt compelled to play it himself.

Maurice LaMarche stated that when he auditioned for the part of Egon in The Real Ghostbusters, he was asked not to do an impression of Ramis, which he ignored because impressions were one of his strengths as a performer, and there was no other way he could imagine properly portraying the character other than to follow Ramis' example. He got the part anyway and said in an interview that he did two different takes: one in which he impersonated Ramis, the other in which he tried a more "Woody Allen"–like approach that did not suit the character's physicality.

== Character ==
Egon Spengler is the member of the team responsible for the main theoretical framework for their paranormal/quantum studies, having earned over a dozen advanced degrees including parapsychology and nuclear engineering from New York University and Massachusetts Institute of Technology, respectively. He is socially awkward, as demonstrated by his stiff interactions with the Ghostbusters' secretary Janine Melnitz, and his reliance on Peter Venkman as a spokesperson for the group.

Egon is the most serious and rigid member of the team. Of his hobbies, Egon states that he collects "spores, molds, and fungus", and claims that, as a child, the only toy he ever had was "part of a Slinky", which he straightened out. As implied in the first movie, Egon apparently is a junk food junkie, due to his affection for sweets and snack crackers. In the second film it is revealed that he and Ray like takeout foods such as pizza, Asian, Greek, and Mexican cuisine; in the first film, there is also a scene where Egon dines on Chinese takeout with Peter and Ray, during which he eats egg rolls while he finishes building the proton packs. Despite being a stereotypical timid professor-like figure, Egon is prone to violent reactions when pushed too far temperamentally, as demonstrated by his attempt to assault Walter Peck.

After Egon dies, the haunting in his farmhouse reveals that, like Ray, he was a skilled automotive mechanic, evidently collected wrecked cars for parts when he was alive and able to repair the Ecto-1's engine with his grandson Trevor as a poltergeist.

== Appearances ==
=== Film ===
==== Ghostbusters (1984) ====
Egon was very interested in paranormal phenomena, even while working with Ray Stantz and Peter Venkman at Columbia University. He and Ray Stantz studied paranormal literature in their spare time, and Egon personally follows John Horace Tobin's works including Tobin's Spirit Guide, and were interested in theories of reincarnation. It is mentioned in the film's novelization that Egon's mother is alive, and he calls her after finding a payphone to inform his termination of his employment at Columbia University, while Peter and Ray are discussing plans for the Ghostbusters business, explaining his absence on this scene.

Egon was usually the first to interview case subjects, adding to their mantra, "we're ready to believe you." Examples were Dana Barrett from her Zuul encounter and her carriage phenomenon with Oscar. Even people Peter called "schizo" always went to either Egon or Ray to describe their paranormal experiences, no matter how far-fetched their stories were. For his part, Venkman once took back everything negative he said about Egon, rewarding the fellow scientist with his favorite candy bar (a Crunch bar). Egon's only weakness is evidently junk food (or at least snacks), as he is seen, on occasion, snacking on candies, crackers (like Cheez-It), egg rolls, and Twinkies.

When house-hunting for their headquarters, Egon was against Peter leasing the firehouse at North Moore Street due to its conditions and location (dilapidated wirings, neighborhood being plagued by criminal elements, etc.), but Ray was attached to the building due to his fondness for its brass fireman's pole and the fact it was a place they could afford with their then-pitiful budgets. In time they renovated the building to suit their needs after their business took off.

With Ray's assistance, Egon developed the technology behind the P.K.E. Meter, the Proton Pack, the Trap, the Aura Analyzer, the para-goggles, and the storage facility. He spent a lot of time focusing on the stability of the storage facility and was concerned about the possibilities of a P.K.E. surge of dangerous proportions. Egon was particularly critical of Walter Peck's actions, and his attitude that the Ghostbusters were responsible for the explosion of the containment unit that occurred when Peck ordered a utility worker to shut the unit down. After their encounter with Stay Puft, Egon suggested an atypical solution when he recommended blasting Gozer's dimensional portal while crossing the proton streams to reverse the particle flow and send Gozer back to its dimension; he was also aware of the inherent risks involved in crossing the streams.

Egon once tried to drill a hole in his own head (a process known as trepanning), which he says "would have worked" if Peter had not stopped him.

==== Ghostbusters II (1989) ====
Due to the large amount of collateral damage New York City suffered from the battle with Gozer, the Ghostbusters were sued by nearly every county and city agency in New York. Additionally a judicial restraining order was enacted which barred the Ghostbusters from performing services as paranormal investigators and eliminators, effectively putting them out of business. Five years after the events of the first film Egon returned to teaching at Manhattan College, working at its Institute for Advanced Theoretical Research and was conducting experiments on human emotions, during which he invented the Giga Meter, a device similar to the PKE Meter designed to detect and measure psychomagnotheric energy in gigaelectron volts. A negative test involved keeping a couple with marriage problems locked in a room for hours and gradually raising the temperature. A positive test involved a girl in a room with dozens of stuffed animals and a puppy.

He was the first person Dana Barrett contacted when her baby carriage took off by itself. Egon recommended bringing in Ray, and they both performed a physical exam on Dana's son Oscar. Egon, along with Peter and Ray were later arrested after digging a large hole under First Avenue as part of their paranormal investigations to help Dana. At trial they were found guilty by judge Stephen Wexler (whom Egon said was known as "The Hammer") of willful destruction of public property, fraud, violating their judicial restraining order, and malicious mischief. While angrily insulting the trio, judge Stephen Wexler inadvertently manifested the ghosts of the Scoleri Brothers, two murderers he sentenced to death by the electric chair. In the ensuing chaos judge Wexler dismisses the charges against the Ghostbusters and rescinds their judicial restraining order, allowing Egon, Ray, and Peter to capture the released ghosts and effectively putting the Ghostbusters back in business.

Egon had a dry sense of humor which he would use to bewilder Peter, and smirked at his friend's cluelessness as to what the word "epididymis" meant.

Egon primarily worked with Ray (both of whom still lived at the Firehouse), conducting research on the pink slime. Eventually they developed "slime blowers", consisting of large metal tanks and handheld nozzles that fire positively charged substance. Still very scientifically minded, Egon here seemed to have loosened up a little bit, letting his sense of humor show and even giving Dana a smile and Peter (who was carried away with photographing Vigo's portrait), a knowing smile. It is implied by Peter that two years prior to the film's events, the team had used their proton packs. Not limited to John H. Tobin's books, Egon and Ray rely on the latter's resources at Ray's Occult Books, and through Leon Zundinger's article in Magicians, Martyrs and Madmen found information about Vigo the Carpathian.

==== Ghostbusters (2016) ====
Although the 2016 Ghostbusters film is a reboot, the film's marketing confirms that a version of Egon Spengler does exist in the film's fictional universe. According to a tie-in video to the film, Kate McKinnon's character Dr. Jillian Holtzmann and Harold Ramis' character Dr. Egon Spengler created the film's proton packs. The paragraph accompanying the video read:

Engineers at Sony Corporation developed the 2016 Proton Pack™ in collaboration with nuclear engineer and munitions expert Dr. Jillian Holtzmann. Sony President and CEO Kazuo Hirai commented "The perfection of the Proton Pack™, long a dream of the world’s greatest engineers since first pioneered by Dr. Egon Spengler of Columbia University, is an example of Sony’s relentless pursuit of innovation. It absolutely delivers the wow factor that is so important to our company mission".

Additionally, in the film itself, a bronze bust of Harold Ramis as the film's version of Spengler is seen just as Erin Gilbert leaves her office. During the credits of Ghostbusters, the words "For Harold Ramis" are seen.

==== Ghostbusters: Afterlife (2021) ====
Ghostbusters: Afterlife, which serves as a direct sequel to the original Ghostbusters and Ghostbusters II, opens with a portrayal of Spengler's death. In the film, it is retroactively established by Jason Reitman and Gil Kenan (with acknowledgements from two of the franchise's creators Dan Aykroyd and Ivan Reitman and Harold Ramis's family as canon), that Egon fathered his daughter Callie around 1982 with someone before the events of the first film. Even Peter and Ray are unaware of her, though Janine does know. However, he became estranged from his family, and Callie grew resentful of her father and blames his life as a scientist for his abandoning her. Despite the Ghostbusters successfully closing the "Manhattan Crossrip of '84", at some point after the "Vigo Incident of '89", Egon had discovered prophecies written by the Cult of Gozer's prophets saying Gozer would return in 2021, but his insistence that the Ghostbusters prepare for this strained their relationship (a nod to the real-life estrangement between Ramis and Bill Murray after their collaboration in the film Groundhog Day), and preparing for the events of the prophecies is the reason for his distance with his daughter, who he intended to protect.

Ten years after the Manhattan Crossrip, Egon stole equipment and the Ecto-1 and moved to Summerville, Oklahoma, where Ivo Shandor had mined the selenium used to build the Shandor Apartments building in New York City. Shandor had built another gateway for Gozer in his mine, and Egon spent years preparing to stop Gozer's eventual return, building automated energy cannons with the components of the proton packs and PKE meter to barricade the portal with crossed streams, as well as setting a ghost trap field with an array of 198 traps for Gozer on his property. He earned the nickname "Dirt Farmer" from Summerville's residents for not growing anything on his land, and for his eccentricity. At some point before the Ghostbusters disbanded, he added a scissor seat on the right side of the Ecto-1 with Ray and added a taser configuration on the team's PKE meters for defense against the spectral entities they hunt; he uses the taser against Gozer's minions after he settled in Summerville, an innovation which even frighted Zuul. He is revealed to be a collector of strange artifacts, like a death whistle from the Aztec culture similar to the ones first discovered by archaeologist Francisco Rivas Castro in 1999, some witch bottles hanged on his dead trees, and Sentinel figurines from Shandor's Gozerian Temple, and still eating junk food. He remained in contact with Janine and had called Ray once, again trying to warn him about Gozer. Due to his advancing age, Egon's health had declined and he struggled with a life-threatening cardiovascular disease.

In June 2021, Egon captured one of Gozer's minions, which Gozer needed to successfully manifest on Earth, and used the creature in an attempt to lure Gozer into the trap field. When the ambush failed because the traps' capacitors malfunctioned, Gozer sent the other minion to attack Egon, who suffered a fatal cardiac arrest and died before Gozer could learn its trapped minion's whereabouts.

Egon's death results in Callie and her two children, Trevor and Phoebe, moving from Chicago to Summerville to take possession of his house and belongings. Because of knowing that their grandfather left their mother and them never had acquainted with him as well as not knowing his past as a Ghostbuster, the children thinks Egon was a ne'er-do-well. Though unseen by his family as a poltergeist (Class 2 or 3, noncorporeal and telekinetic), Egon's presence guides Phoebe into continuing with his plan to defeat Gozer, and she eventually stages an ambush after forming her own Ghostbusters team. In the process, Egon establishes a familial bond with Phoebe which he was unable to do with Callie when he was alive, as Phoebe takes after him. In turn, Phoebe is affectionate to her ghostly grandfather, respecting Egon as a fellow scientist and chess player, and feeling hurt when her mother expresses contempt for Egon. He also guides Callie to realize that, even if he was not present, he had always kept an eye on her life. When Ray, Peter and Winston arrive to aid the family in stopping Gozer, Egon materializes as a fully formed Class 4 Full Torso Apparition (much like the Library Ghost when in human form in the first film) beside Phoebe to help them one last time. He embraces his family and acknowledges his colleagues before fading away to the afterlife.

Outside of archived audio clips, Egon has no speaking lines throughout the film and his face was obscured in present-day shots until his return as a ghost. The likeness of Harold Ramis was recreated digitally for key shots in conjunction with body doubles (Bob Gunton and Ivan Reitman). In the beginning of the credits at the end of the film, the words "For Harold" are seen once again.

==== Ghostbusters: Frozen Empire (2024) ====
In the sequel Ghostbusters: Frozen Empire, the Ghostbusters' new recruit Lars Pinfield (James Acaster) took over Egon's position as the team's resident inventor, modifying his equipment with the 21st century components, include reverse-engineering his ecto-containment unit into a machine that can extract spiritual energy. Like Egon's granddaughter Phoebe, Pinfield's appearance and behaviors are eerily similar to Egon's despite not being related to him. Egon is mentioned occasionally, and old photographs and footages of Harold Ramis as Egon appear briefly, and Phoebe keeps her grandfather's original proton pack as hers since Summerville and later plates it with brass to fight the horned deity Garraka. The day before battling Garraka, it is implied that Phoebe assaulted Walter Peck offscreen, as Egon attempted to years ago, resulting her being arrested.

=== Television ===
==== The Real Ghostbusters ====
Egon's hair was changed from brown in the films (Ramis' natural hair color) to a blond pompadour in the animated series (Egon wore his hair in a ponytail on Extreme Ghostbusters). This was explained as they did not want everyone to have dark hair, and wanted the characters to each have a distinguishing feature so the audience would be able to easily recognize each one.

Despite his leanings toward science, Egon has a family history of witchcraft (three ancestors, Zedekiah, Eli and Ezekiel, were wizards), of which he is not so much ashamed as "strongly" considers irrelevant, mainly because he sees science as relevant. Egon's faith in science was also tested in one episode where the Ghostbusters get abducted to the ghost world by the ghost of Al Capone. Egon's scientific equipment fails until he is told by former capos of Capone (who aid the Ghostbusters in revenge for Capone double-crossing them) that only magic can harm ghosts in the ghost world as opposed to science harming ghosts in the human world, thus forcing Egon to accept the wizardry methods of his ancestors to defeat Capone.

He is the love interest of Janine Melnitz, the Ghostbusters' secretary, in the first film and both animated series (Ghostbusters II excluded their romance due to Ramis' dislike of the subplot, thus having Janine date Louis Tully instead). Egon sometimes appears to be unaware of Janine's romantic interest in him, but at times he displays having similar feelings for her, such as when he gave her a geranium as a gift when she expressed an interest in plants (which backfired horribly when it was revealed that the geranium was possessed by a ghost and nearly destroyed her apartment, along with much of Brooklyn; though Egon managed to thwart the ghost, Janine angrily told Egon he would have to pay for the damages to her home) and when he rushed to her rescue in "Janine, You've Changed"; he also embraces her in "Ghost Busted" after she was kidnapped and held for ransom by a gangster, and became jealous when she was briefly involved with a slimy businessman named Paul Smart.

In the episode "Cry Uncle", Egon's well-meaning but skeptical uncle Cyrus, visits him and, since he does not believe that Egon's work with the Ghostbusters is real scientific work and therefore a waste of Egon's genius, tries to make him come back to Ohio (where Egon grew up) to work at his uncle's lab, but fortunately, after his uncle accidentally releases the Stay Puft Marshmallow Man from the containment unit, he realizes that ghosts are real and accepts Egon's work.

Throughout the series, Egon would have his soul switched with that of a demon, have his molecular structure destabilized to the point that it stranded him in the Netherworld (requiring him to be rescued by the others), regress into a baby, turn into a were-chicken, and have his intellect switched with Slimer's. He has however, ceased his sugar junkie ways, only to briefly be tempted by a candy store when in Slimer's body (a likely fact that Slimer was an overt glutton).

It is revealed in "The Boogieman Cometh" that, as a child, Egon was stalked by the boogieman, a supernatural monster that fed on the fear of children and hid in their closets, and was particularly fond of Egon's fear; it was these encounters with the creature that inspired Egon to study the paranormal, and as an adult, he would battle the Boogieman twice and defeat him.

It is implied in one episode of the animated series that Egon accidentally burned down his family's garage.

In both this series and its follow-up, Egon is voiced by Maurice LaMarche. LaMarche has said in interviews that he was instructed by the producers not to impersonate Ramis when he auditioned for the role. However, he did so anyway and ultimately got the part.

==== Extreme Ghostbusters ====
Egon is the only original Ghostbuster to return for the Extreme Ghostbusters series as a regular (with Maurice LaMarche reprising his role), acting as a mentor to the new Ghostbusters (the others appeared for a two-part episode, "Back in the Saddle"), monitoring and sustaining the Containment Unit and taking care of Slimer while working as a paranormal studies professor at a university. He is the de facto leader of the new, younger team of Ghostbusters; although the old team had gone into retirement after they apparently dealt with all the ghosts in the city, after the digging of a new subway tunnel resulted in the release of an ancient ghost, Spengler was forced to recruit his only four current students to act as the new Ghostbusters.

Although willing to do his share of the legwork, Egon overestimates his abilities and his aging becomes apparent when he is no longer able to work at the same level as in his younger days, generally working at the firehouse doing research while the team handle the actual 'Ghostbusting', though when the situation calls for it he will help. Janine is still carrying a torch for him, which leaves him a little flustered. He celebrates his 40th birthday during this series, which would put him in his late twenties when The Real Ghostbusters began. Age is the largest factor causing Egon to having transition from active ghost hunting to a mentorship role; in one episode where the original Ghostbusters guest starred on an episode the audience clearly sees middle adulthood has affected the speed and weakened the stamina of the original Ghostbusters.

==== The Earth Day Special ====
Although Egon Spengler does not appear in the 1990 The Earth Day Special, his character and status as a Ghostbuster is mentioned, and Harold Ramis portrays his twin brother, named Elon Spengler, who is the President of the Wastebusters.

=== Video games ===
==== Ghostbusters: The Video Game ====
A likeness of Ramis circa 1991 (the year in which the game takes place) appears in the Ghostbusters: The Video Game that was released on June 16, 2009. Ramis also reprised his role for the game by voicing him. In the game, Egon becomes significantly more 'hands-on' during the course of the video game. He and Ray instruct the Rookie in the use of the Proton Pack and its eventual PCS upgrades. Over the course of the game, it becomes evident that he was somewhat traumatized by their exhausting trek up the stairs of 55 Central Park West. While in the alternate dimension of the library, Egon is heard to groan, "Oh no," and when Ray asks if he saw something scary, Egon replies, "Stairs, lots of stairs". Before the "Return to Sedgewick Hotel" mission, Stantz comments that Egon was once a coroner, to which he replied that he maintains interest in the subject as a hobby. Like other Ghostbusters, Egon remains carrying a grudge against Walter Peck and struggles to control his anger when Peck is around. According to a message left on the Ghostbusters' answering machine, Peck made calls that canceled Egon's orders for parts that he needed with pleasure.

==== Beeline's Ghostbusters ====
Egon appears in Beeline's Ghostbusters game for iOS alongside his niece, Michelle Ying. The game was released on January 24, 2013.

==== Lego Dimensions ====
Egon appears in Lego Dimensions, with archival audio of Harold Ramis being used to represent his character.

=== Comics ===
- Egon appears in the Ghostbusters manga, entitled Ghost Busted, where he tells an actress he studied four years at Columbia University, studied two years at Oxford University, and had an extended residence with the Gnostic Monks of Carpathia.
