= Podcast (disambiguation) =

Podcasts are downloadable recorded audio (radio) programs (audio logs) that one can listen to.

Podcast or variation, may also refer to:

- "Podcast", a fictional character from the film Ghostbusters: Afterlife
- Podcasts (app), Apple software for playing and streaming audio programming

== See also ==
- Category:Podcasting
- Category:Podcasts
