= Ghostbusters: The Video Game =

2009 action-adventure video game

- Windows, PS3, and Xbox 360 box art
- Developers: Terminal Reality (PS3, Windows, X360); Red Fly Studio (PS2, PSP, Wii); War Drum Studios (PS2); Saber Interactive (Remastered); A.C.R.O.N.Y.M. Games
- Publishers: Atari Interactive (Note: PAL-region releases for PlayStation consoles were published by Sony Computer Entertainment Europe.); Mad Dog Games (Remastered)
- Director: Drew Haworth
- Producer: Michael Duane Fetterman
- Designers: Andy Dombroski; Glenn Gamble
- Programmers: Craig Reichard; Nathan Peugh
- Artists: Austin Cline; Grant Gosler; Robert St Aubin; Daniel Soni
- Writers: Dan Aykroyd; Harold Ramis; Flint Dille; John Zuur Platten; John Melchior; Patrick Hegarty
- Composers: Kyle Richards; Chris Rickwood
- Series: Ghostbusters
- Engine: Infernal Engine
- Platforms: Microsoft Windows, PlayStation 2, PlayStation 3, PlayStation Portable, Xbox 360, Wii, Nintendo DS; Remastered Version: Nintendo Switch, PlayStation 4, Xbox One, Microsoft Windows
- Release: June 16, 2009: PS2, PS3; NA: June 16, 2009; EU: June 19, 2009 Wii, Windows, Xbox 360; NA: June 16, 2009; EU: November 6, 2009 PlayStation Portable; NA: October 30, 2009; EU: November 6, 2009; AU: November 12, 2009 Remastered Version: Switch, PS4, Xbox One; WW: October 4, 2019
- Genres: Action-adventure, Third-person shooter
- Modes: Single-player, multiplayer

Ghostbusters: The Video Game is a 2009 action-adventure third-person shooter video game based on the Ghostbusters media franchise. Terminal Reality developed the Windows, PlayStation 3, and Xbox 360 versions, while Red Fly Studio developed the PlayStation 2, PlayStation Portable, and Wii versions. The game was released after several development delays and multiple publisher changes. In North America, all versions of the game were published by Atari Interactive, while in Europe, the PlayStation 2, PlayStation Portable, and PlayStation 3 versions were published by Sony Computer Entertainment Europe. A separate game for the Nintendo DS with the same title was developed by Zen Studios and released at the same time, albeit with substantial differences in the gameplay and story.

The game follows the player's character as a recruit in the Ghostbusters, a team of parapsychologists who pursue and capture ghosts. The game features elements of typical third-person shooters, but instead of a traditional gun, each player is equipped with a Proton Pack, and other technological means of fighting and capturing ghosts. The game's plot is set in 1991, two years after the events of Ghostbusters II, with the Ghostbusters team training the player's character while investigating paranormal activities in New York City.

Many of the principal cast members from the films were involved in the game's production. Each of the actors who portrayed the Ghostbusters in the films (Dan Aykroyd, Harold Ramis, Bill Murray, and Ernie Hudson) lent their voices and likenesses to the in-game characters. It is also Ramis's final portrayal as Egon Spengler in the Ghostbusters franchise before his death in 2014, and the game's remastered edition was posthumously dedicated to him. Aykroyd and Ramis, who wrote the films, also aided in script doctoring for the game. Other film cast members to reprise their roles were William Atherton, and Annie Potts. Ghostbusters: The Video Game contains the soundtrack from the original Ghostbusters film, along with various characters, locations, and props featured in the films. Aykroyd later described the game as being "essentially the third movie."

The game received generally favorable reviews from critics, and more than three million copies were sold. A remastered version for Microsoft Windows, Nintendo Switch, PlayStation 4, and Xbox One, developed by Saber Interactive and published by Mad Dog Games, was released on October 4, 2019.

== Gameplay ==
The single-player campaign is the same for the PlayStation 3, Windows, and Xbox 360 versions of the game. The PS2 and Wii versions have a significantly different campaign, but the stories are mostly identical.

The game is a third-person shooter, placing players in the role of a new recruit to the Ghostbusters team known as "the Rookie". Players control the Rookie's movements as he explores the environments of each level, seeking out paranormal activities and ghosts, either alone or with the other Ghostbusters. Players can switch to a first-person perspective by equipping the Rookie with a PKE Meter and goggles. In this mode, paranormal items are highlighted and the PKE Meter helps direct players to ghosts or haunted artifacts.

In both the original and the remastered versions of the game, Terminal Reality's Infernal Engine allows for the Ghostbusters' Proton Stream to bend in real time, reacting as it did in the films.

Players can aim and fire a Proton Stream to weaken ghosts, before switching to a capture stream to maneuver them into a ghost trap. Players must vent the Proton Pack to avoid it overheating, which can prevent the use of the pack's weapons. The Capture Stream can also be used to "slam" ghosts, and move objects in the environment.

Over the course of the game, the Proton Pack can be upgraded to include additional firing modes such as the Shock Blast, Slime Blower (positively charged), and a Meson Collider, each with an alternate firing mode (a Boson Dart, Stasis Stream, Slime Tether and Overload Pulse). Upgrades are earned by capturing ghosts, and identifying cursed artifacts and new species of ghost. The game also tallies monetary destruction caused by the player, with PlayStation 3 Trophies and Xbox 360 Achievements awarded for either minimizing damage done, or for causing a high amount of damage.

Many of the achievements' names come from quotes in the films, such as the "You Gotta Try This Pole" achievement.

In place of a traditional heads-up display, the player's health and weapon status are represented as meters on the back of the Proton Pack. The player's health regenerates over time if they do not take further damage, and if knocked down, the player can be revived by any Ghostbusters still standing. Similarly, the player can help revive fallen team members. If all active Ghostbusters fall, including the player, the player must restart at the last checkpoint.

=== Other versions ===
The PlayStation 2, PSP, and Wii versions differ slightly from the PlayStation 3, Windows, and Xbox 360 versions. In addition to the cartoon-like graphics and the E10+ rating, the Wii version uses the Wii Remote for gameplay. Visual aspects of the interface are relocated, such as placing the Proton Pack's temperature meter as a HUD element instead of on the backpack. In the PlayStation 2, PSP, and Wii versions, the player "slams" a ghost by initiating a Simon Says-type game with the ghost, and the player can choose to play as a man or woman.

The DS version shares the same plot, but its gameplay differs in that it is in a squad-based tactical style, with driving sections and RPG elements. The player controls the original cast rather than an unnamed rookie.

=== Multiplayer ===
The PlayStation 3 and Xbox 360 versions feature an online multiplayer mode. Players can play online with up to three others in a variety of missions outside of the main storyline. These missions include capturing as many ghosts as possible in a limited period of time or attempting to defend ghost disruptors as they are charged up. The Wii version is the only platform to feature offline multiplayer, with the entire single-player mission playable by two players in a split-screen mode. An adversarial multiplayer suite was advertised for the Wii version as well, but it is not in the final release. In December 2012, after three years of online gameplay, Atari shut the PlayStation 3 servers down for the online modes. Atari cited the declining online gameplay as the main reason for shutting down the servers.

== Synopsis ==
=== Setting and characters ===
The disembodied spirit of Ivo Shandor, shown prior to the character taking the Destructor Form called "The Architect", an unseen antagonist in the film Ghostbusters (1984), is formally introduced as the game's chief adversary.

Ghostbusters: The Video Game is set in November 1991 during the Thanksgiving celebrations, two years after the events of the 1989 supernatural comedy film Ghostbusters II. The primary characters are Peter Venkman (Bill Murray), Raymond Stantz (Dan Aykroyd), and Egon Spengler (Harold Ramis), a trio of eccentric parapsychologists who start a ghost-catching business in New York City known as the Ghostbusters. In the original film Ghostbusters, the team combat a rising paranormal threat in the city, hiring a fourth member, Winston Zeddemore (Ernie Hudson) to cope with demand. It is revealed that this threat was the result of machinations by long-dead cult leader Ivo Shandor to bring about catastrophe using his building, 55 Central Park West, to summon the demi-god Gozer the Gozerian. Ghostbusters II follows the team after they have been put out of business due to the damage caused by defeating Gozer. They re-form as a new threat arises in the form of Vigo the Carpathian, a 16th-century tyrant reborn in a painting. In Ghostbusters: The Video Game, the Ghostbusters have become city contractors, authorized and insured to capture ghosts.

The game's player character Rookie, in likeness of associate editor Ryan French

The player character is a new recruit dubbed the "Rookie". He is tasked with testing the Ghostbusters' experimental and dangerous devices. Returning characters from the films include the team's receptionist Janine Melnitz (Annie Potts), Walter Peck (William Atherton), who heads the Paranormal Contracts Oversight Commission (PCOC), which oversees the Ghostbusters' operations, Vigo the Carpathian (Max von Sydow), the ghost Slimer, and the Stay Puft Marshmallow Man, which is the Destructor form of Gozer. The game introduces Mesopotamian professor and Gozerian expert Ilyssa Selwyn, (Alyssa Milano) Jock Mulligan (Brian Doyle-Murray), who succeeded Lenny Clotch as the mayor of New York City, and the Ghostbusters recruit (the game's associate editor Ryan French). The events of the game are set in motion by the machinations of Shandor, who, in death, has become powerful and elevated to the level of a deity, known as a Node Guardian, alongside their accomplices, as well as Edmund Hoover, Cornelius Wellesly, and Evelyn Lewis, who are identified in-game as Azetlor the Destroyer, the Chairman, and the Spider-Witch, respectively. The Ghostbusters find themselves battling them and other spirits of Gozerian cultists, along with their restless murdered victims and random ghosts that are lured by the cult's mandala.

=== Plot ===
A psi energy pulse emanates from the Gozer exhibit at the Museum of Natural History, engulfing New York City and increasing supernatural activity. The pulse frees Slimer from the Ghostbusters' headquarters, and the Ghostbusters and the Rookie pursue him to the Sedgewick Hotel, where Slimer was first captured. They find that the hotel is haunted by dozens of ghosts and that the Destructor Form of Gozer, the Stay-Puft Marshmallow Man, has returned and is wreaking havoc throughout the city. Under Ray's guidance, the Rookie destroys Stay-Puft, with the Ghostbusters noting that he was pursuing Sumerian expert Dr. Ilyssa Selwyn.

Another haunting at the New York Public Library draws the team into a confrontation with the restless spirit of the librarian, Dr. Eleanor Twitty (the first ghost encountered by the Ghostbusters in the first film). They learn that Dr. Twitty had been murdered by the philologist Edmund Hoover (a Gozerian cult leader known as the Collector) over a rare book, the Gozerian Codex. After capturing Dr. Twitty, a portal opens to an afterlife dimension referred to by the Ghostbusters as the Ghost World. The Ghostbusters travel through the portal and encounter the spirits of Gozerian cultists. These spirits include Hoover, reborn as Sumerian demi-god Azetlor the Destroyer, whom the Ghostbusters defeat. A recurring symbol the team sees in these haunted locations is revealed to be a mandala representing a spiritual labyrinth running throughout the city, with major nodes positioned toward the library, museum, hotel, and in the Hudson River. The mandala is powered by the ghosts that are drawn into it, increasing in power as they pass through each node, before being fed into the core to power a Destructor Form like Gozer's. The energy merges the Ghost World into the mortal realm, which could result in a disaster of apocalyptic proportions.

Mayor Jock Mulligan places the team's nemesis, Walter Peck, in charge over the Ghostbusters' operations. The Ghostbusters cleanse the museum and hotel and defeat two cult leaders, the Chairman (Cornelius Wellesly) and the Spider-Witch (Evelyn Lewis). At the final node in the Hudson River, the team locates Ivo Shandor's island mansion rising from the water, and discovers that Ilyssa is the occultist's orphan descendant who was unaware of her true heritage. It was Ilyssa's presence that triggered the mandala after Peck recommended her to curate the Gozer exhibit, leading the Ghostbusters to suspect that he is a Gozer cultist who orchestrated the events. They also discover machines built by the cultists pumping various colors of ectoplasmic slime into tunnels beneath the city, including the pink "mood slime" from their prior adventure, turning the municipality into a supernatural hotspot that allowed the spirit of Vigo the Carpathian to empower himself. The Ghostbusters disable the pumps and destroy the creature producing the slime, closing the last node and sealing the mandala, trapping its accumulated energies.

Returning to their headquarters, the Ghostbusters find that Ilyssa had been abducted and the team's ecto-containment unit had been shut down again, releasing their supernatural captives. Because the team disabled the mandala, the cultists retaliate by using the Ghostbusters' captives to provide an alternate energy for their Supreme Destructor and need Ilyssa for the ritual. The Ghostbusters battle their way to the center of a mausoleum emerging in Central Park. Like Shandor's building on Central Park West where they defeated Gozer, it is also a gateway between dimensions. They discover that Ilyssa and Peck are both prisoners, and that Shandor's spirit has in fact possessed Mayor Mulligan while using Peck as his decoy and pawn to hinder their operations. Seeing his god defeated by the Ghostbusters twice, Shandor decided to usurp Gozer's position and deal with them himself, having become godlike after making pacts with the Gozerian pantheon. Because Shandor is already dead, he would need a living blood relative (Ilyssa) nearby for his schemes to work. The Ghostbusters exorcise Shandor from the Mayor but are dragged into the Ghost World, where they battle Shandor's Destructor Form, a being called the Architect hell-bent on ruling a post-apocalyptic world as its god. Just as they had done to defeat Gozer, the Ghostbusters cross their proton streams, causing an explosion that destroys Shandor's avatar and sends the team home. They escape the collapsing mausoleum with Ilyssa, Peck, and Mayor Mulligan.

During the credits, as the public celebrates the Ghostbusters victory, the group and Ilyssa realize they are overstaffed, but offer the Rookie a position as the head of a yet-to-be-opened Ghostbusters franchise in another location.

== Development ==
In-game likenesses of Ernie Hudson, Harold Ramis, Dan Aykroyd, and Bill Murray

In 2006, game developer ZootFly started to work on a Ghostbusters game before having secured the rights to develop the game from Sony. The company subsequently released videos of an early version of the game. The company was unable to secure the rights to develop the game as a Ghostbusters game, continuing to develop the game as a non-Ghostbusters-themed game renamed TimeO.

Coincidentally, in 2007, Vivendi Games and developer Terminal Reality met with Sony Pictures to discuss the possibility of developing their own Ghostbusters video game. The positive reaction that Zootfly's videos garnered helped sell the concept of such a game to Sony. After a successful pitch, Terminal Reality started developing the game, eventually stating that the PlayStation 3 would be the lead development platform. One feature of the game that Terminal Reality promoted was a crowd artificial intelligence system to be used extensively for a Thanksgiving Day parade level that was eventually cut from the final version. Terminal Reality had seventy people on the project, along with thirty to fifty contractors worldwide.

The game was officially announced by Vivendi Games subsidiary Sierra Entertainment and Sony Pictures Consumer Products on November 19, 2007, and would be released for all major platforms within the Fall of 2008.

Development of the game went into limbo when Vivendi Games's merger with Activision to form Activision Blizzard was finalized. On July 28, 2008, Activision Blizzard announced that only five Sierra titles would be published through Activision, with Ghostbusters not being one of them. The Sierra PR team later confirmed that the game was not, and would not, be canceled.

In October 2008, Infogrames, the parent company of Atari and Atari Interactive, announced they had picked up the publishing rights to Ghostbusters and The Chronicles of Riddick: Assault on Dark Athena from Activision. to coincide with the 25th anniversary of the first film's theatrical release. Infogrames' announcement ended months of speculation. At the 2009 Consumer Electronics Show, Sony confirmed that the game would be released on June 16 in North America and June 19 in Europe, alongside Blu-ray releases of the Ghostbusters films. In May 2009, Atari Europe sold the European publishing rights to the PlayStation versions of the game to Sony Computer Entertainment Europe for a June 2009 timed exclusive release on the PS3 and PS2, and an Autumn release for the PSP respectively. Atari Europe announced they would still release the Wii, Xbox 360 and DS versions in the regions. Following Namco Bandai Games' purchase of Atari's European operations and distribution handing over to Namco Bandai Partners, this release schedule remained intact.

Terminal Reality reported total development costs between US$15 and 20 million. Terminal Reality had expressed interest in making a game based on the possible third Ghostbusters film, though the studio has since shut down.

The project allowed Dan Aykroyd and Harold Ramis to explore some aspects of the original films that they otherwise had not been able to in the past, such as incorporating a boat as transportation, an idea Aykroyd wanted in the films. It also allowed Aykroyd and Ramis to pursue some of the ideas left out of the original script, including the appearance of Ivo Shandor as Gozer, who was intended to appear in the film's finale as the ghost of a man in a business suit. Other concepts used in the game, such as the alternate dimensions that open up during the latter half of the game, are based on the original Ghostbusters 3 concept Hellbent, which was in development hell during the 1990s.

Bill Murray made several demands, including equal screen time for all Ghostbuster characters, but was fully committed to the project.

Sigourney Weaver had initially turned down the offer to reprise her role of Dana Barrett when approached by Terminal Reality but showed interest when she learned that Murray was attached to the project. At this time, the game was too far into production and there was no role for Weaver. Similarly, the team was interested in getting Rick Moranis to reprise his role as Louis Tully, but he declined the offer. Despite the lack of character roles and involvement from Weaver and Moranis, Dana and Louis are both mentioned in the game.

In the remastered version, Harold Ramis was remembered at the end of the game's opening titles following his death in 2014.

== Reception ==
Reception

Aggregate score
Aggregator	Score
Metacritic	PC: 74/100; PS2: 64/100; PS3: 78/100; WII: 76/100; X360: 79/100; PSP: 54/100; PS4: 66/100

Review scores
Publication	Score
GameSpot	7.5/10
IGN	8.0/10
PSM3	85/100

Ghostbusters: The Video Game was met with a generally positive reception. Greg Miller of IGN gave it 8.0 out of 10, describing the game as a "love letter to Ghostbusters fans" that "makes you feel like you are really a Ghostbuster". He lauded the CGI cutscenes as a positive feature but disliked the lip-sync and found the character animation to be stiff in the other cutscenes. Miller gave the Wii version a 7.8 out of 10. Fellow reviewer Matt Casamassina believed that the aiming system in Ghostbusters was better than the aiming system in Resident Evil 4. PSM3 gave the game a score of 85 out of 100, stating that the game was "too short, but packed with quality and imagination." The A.V. Club gave the game a B−, concluding that "It's the best Ghostbusters game of all time, though that really isn't saying much." Kevin VanOrd of GameSpot rated the Xbox 360 and PlayStation 3 versions of the game a 7.5 out of 10, listing the ghost-trapping gameplay and multiplayer mode as positives, and the frustrating spots in the game and repetitive gameplay as negatives. VanOrd gave the Wii version an 8 out of 10, stating that "Ghostbusters is such riotous fun that you'll forgive its short length."

Ars Technica reported graphical differences between the PlayStation 3 and Xbox 360 versions of the game. Though both versions were developed simultaneously by Terminal Reality, Ars claims that the PlayStation 3 version appears to use lower quality textures compared to the Xbox 360 version.

Reviews for the Windows version of the game were more mixed. Reviewers praised various elements of the gameplay, story, acting, and graphics in a way consistent with the other platforms, but noted the lack of multiplayer support and the digital rights management implementation. While the Windows version received a generally positive review from GameSpot's Kevin VanOrd, it received a slightly lower score than the Xbox 360 and PS3 versions due to having no multiplayer features and exhibiting "noticeable signs of console porting, such as minimal graphics options and keyboard-centric menus."

According to Terminal Reality, the game sold over one million units by mid-July 2009. In October 2019, it was revealed the game had sold more than 3 million units.

=== Awards ===
Award	Category	Nominee	Result
13th Annual Interactive Achievement Awards	Outstanding Achievement in Adapted Story	Harold Ramis, Patrick Hegarty, Flint Dille, Dan Aykroyd, John Melchior	Nominated
Spike Video Game Award	Best Game Based on a Movie/TV Show		Nominated
Spike Video Game Award	Best Performance by a Human Male	Bill Murray	Nominated
Spike Video Game Award	Best Cast		Nominated

== Remastered version ==
A remastered version of the game, developed by Saber Interactive and published by Mad Dog Games, was released for Xbox One, Nintendo Switch, PlayStation 4, and Microsoft Windows on October 4, 2019, marking the game's 10th anniversary and the franchise's 35th anniversary. It is dedicated to Harold Ramis, who died five years before the game was remastered. The game's remastered version is based on the PlayStation 3, Xbox 360, and Microsoft Windows versions of the original game. Online features were said to be in development before its release, but were later cancelled due to the code "not cooperating." Foreign language voice tracks recorded for the game were also removed from the remastered version for unknown reasons.

== Legacy ==
Ghostbusters: The Video Game was developed while Dan Aykroyd and Harold Ramis were trying to write a script for a second sequel following Ghostbusters II; this was principally related to the uncertainty on Bill Murray's participation in filming. Around 2005, the script accounted for Murray's potential absence by replacing him with Ben Stiller, leading to initial discussions for how the project would go forward.

Terminal Reality's game was developed with some input from Aykroyd and Ramis. As they incorporated elements of the Ghostbusters 3 script that they had been working on; Aykroyd considered the game to be "essentially the third movie". They were successful in getting all four actors—Murray, Aykroyd, Ramis, and Hudson—to voice their characters in-game. The project's ability to overcome Murray's prior reluctance led Sony to put more effort behind a new Ghostbusters film. In September 2008, Sony announced that work on a new Ghostbusters film was in full production, even if they could not get all four actors involved. The film went under many conflicts and eventually morphed into the 2016 Ghostbusters reboot. Sony later established Ghost Corps, a studio with plans to expand the Ghostbusters franchise into a narrative universe similar to the Marvel Cinematic Universe. Ghost Corps produced a sequel to the original film, titled Ghostbusters: Afterlife. The film is set 36 years later and was released in 2021.

== See also ==
- List of Ghostbusters video games
