= Ghostbusters: Afterlife =

2021 film by Jason Reitman

- Theatrical release poster
- Directed by: Jason Reitman
- Written by: Gil Kenan; Jason Reitman
- Based on: Ghostbusters by: Dan Aykroyd; Harold Ramis
- Produced by: Ivan Reitman
- Starring: Carrie Coon; Finn Wolfhard; Mckenna Grace; Annie Potts; Ernie Hudson; Paul Rudd
- Cinematography: Eric Steelberg
- Edited by: Dana E. Glauberman; Nathan Orloff
- Music by: Rob Simonsen
- Production companies: Columbia Pictures; Bron Creative; Ghost Corps
- Distributed by: Sony Pictures Releasing
- Release date: November 19, 2021 (United States)
- Running time: 124 minutes
- Country: United States
- Language: English
- Budget: $75 million
- Box office: $204.3 million

Ghostbusters: Afterlife (Note: Titled onscreen during the main-on-end titles as Ghostbusters) is a 2021 American supernatural comedy film directed by Jason Reitman, who co-wrote it with Gil Kenan. It is a sequel to Ghostbusters (1984) and Ghostbusters II (1989) and is the third mainline installment and the fourth overall in the Ghostbusters franchise. The film stars Carrie Coon, Finn Wolfhard, Mckenna Grace and Paul Rudd, with Annie Potts and Ernie Hudson reprising their roles from the earlier films. Set thirty-two years after the events of Ghostbusters II, it follows a single mother and her children who move to an Oklahoma farm they inherited from her estranged father Egon Spengler, a member of the original Ghostbusters.

A third main Ghostbusters film had been in development since the release of Ghostbusters II, but production stalled because Bill Murray had refused to return to the series. Following Harold Ramis' death in 2014, Sony Pictures produced a female-led reboot, which was released in 2016. In January 2019, it was announced that Reitman would direct a sequel to the original films, with the new cast being announced by July, while original cast members Potts, Hudson, Murray, Dan Aykroyd and Sigourney Weaver signed on two months later. Principal photography took place from July to October of that year.

After being delayed four times from an original July 2020 date due to the COVID-19 pandemic, Ghostbusters: Afterlife was released in the United States on November 19 by Sony Pictures Releasing. The film received mixed reviews from critics and grossed $204 million against a $75 million budget. A sequel, Ghostbusters: Frozen Empire, was released in 2024.

== Plot ==
in Summerville Oklahoma Egon Spengler captures an entity at occultist Ivo Shandor's mine outside of town and lures another to his farm. He activates an elaborate setup on his property, but the power fails. Egon manages to conceal the ghost trap in his home, before being attacked by the entity and suffering a fatal heart attack, Egon’s estranged and financially struggling daughter Callie inherits the farm and moves there with her children, Trevor and Phoebe, after being evicted from their Chicago apartment. Trevor becomes infatuated with carhop Lucky Domingo, and the scientifically minded Phoebe enrolls in a summer science class taught by seismologist Gary Grooberson, whom Callie later dates.

Phoebe discovers the farmhouse is haunted, and the invisible ghost residing in it leads her to the ghost trap, which she shows to Gary and her new friend, "Podcast". Gary, a fan of the Ghostbusters, helps her learn more about them and her grandfather. He, Phoebe and Podcast tamper with the trap, releasing Vinz Clortho, Keymaster of Gozer the Gozerian, who escapes to the mine. The farm ghost leads Phoebe to Egon's underground laboratory and, after revealing himself as her grandfather, guides her in restoring the Ghostbusters' equipment.

While testing the proton pack with Podcast, Phoebe finds a ghost they call "Muncher" that haunts Shandor's foundry and flees to town. Having repaired the Ghostbusters' engine with Egon's help, Trevor uses the car to chase Muncher with the duo; they capture him, but are arrested for the damage incurred, and their equipment is seized. Using the Ghostbusters' telephone number that she had written down, Phoebe contacts Ray Stantz for help, informing him of Egon's death. In turn, Ray tells her what became of the Ghostbusters following Vigo the Carpathian's defeat (Note: As depicted in Ghostbusters II (1989)) – the team had disbanded following a downturn in business, and Egon then moved to Summerville with all their equipment to pursue an unspecified threat.

Gary is attacked and possessed by Vinz after returning the children home following a date with Callie. Egon leads Callie to a wall of detailed notes and pictures he kept of her life, showing he cared about her more than she thought. Soon after, she is possessed by Zuul, Gatekeeper of Gozer. Phoebe, Podcast, Lucky and Trevor find a Gozerian temple within the mine. Exploring further, they discover the long-deceased Shandor beginning to revive in his casket as automated proton cannons, installed by Egon, hinder Gozer's attempts to cross over. Vinz sabotages the cannons and performs a mating rite with Zuul, allowing Gozer to escape and take physical form. Shandor awakens and pledges his fealty to Gozer, but she kills him.

The children discover Egon's "farm" is an array of ghost traps buried in a dirt field. As supernatural chaos rages throughout town, they free Muncher and use him to recover the seized ghostbusting equipment and Ecto-1, then head to the mine. Phoebe distracts Gozer so Podcast can re-capture Zuul, freeing Callie and weakening Gozer's physical form. They lure Gozer and Vinz to the trap field, but it malfunctions and Zuul possesses Lucky, restoring Gozer's full power. Ray, along with Peter Venkman and Winston Zeddemore, arrive to help and confront Gozer, who seeks to avenge her previous defeat. (Note: As depicted in Ghostbusters (1984)) Supported by Egon's now-manifested ghost, Phoebe uses his proton pack to combat Gozer. The Ghostbusters assist by crossing their packs' proton streams while Trevor uses his to charge the traps' power source, allowing Callie to activate them and capture Gozer and all the other ghosts. Lucky and Gary are freed from their possessions, and Egon reconciles with his family and friends before ascending to the afterlife.

In a mid-credits scene, the original Ghostbusters return to New York City and Venkman is revealed to be married to Dana Barrett. In a post-credits scene, Winston, having become a wealthy entrepreneur and family man since leaving the Ghostbusters, returns the fully restored Ecto-1 to the team's old firehouse headquarters. In the basement, a light on their old ghost containment system begins to flash red.

== Cast ==
The new film's cast was announced in July 2019, with the cast of the original film signing on two months later:

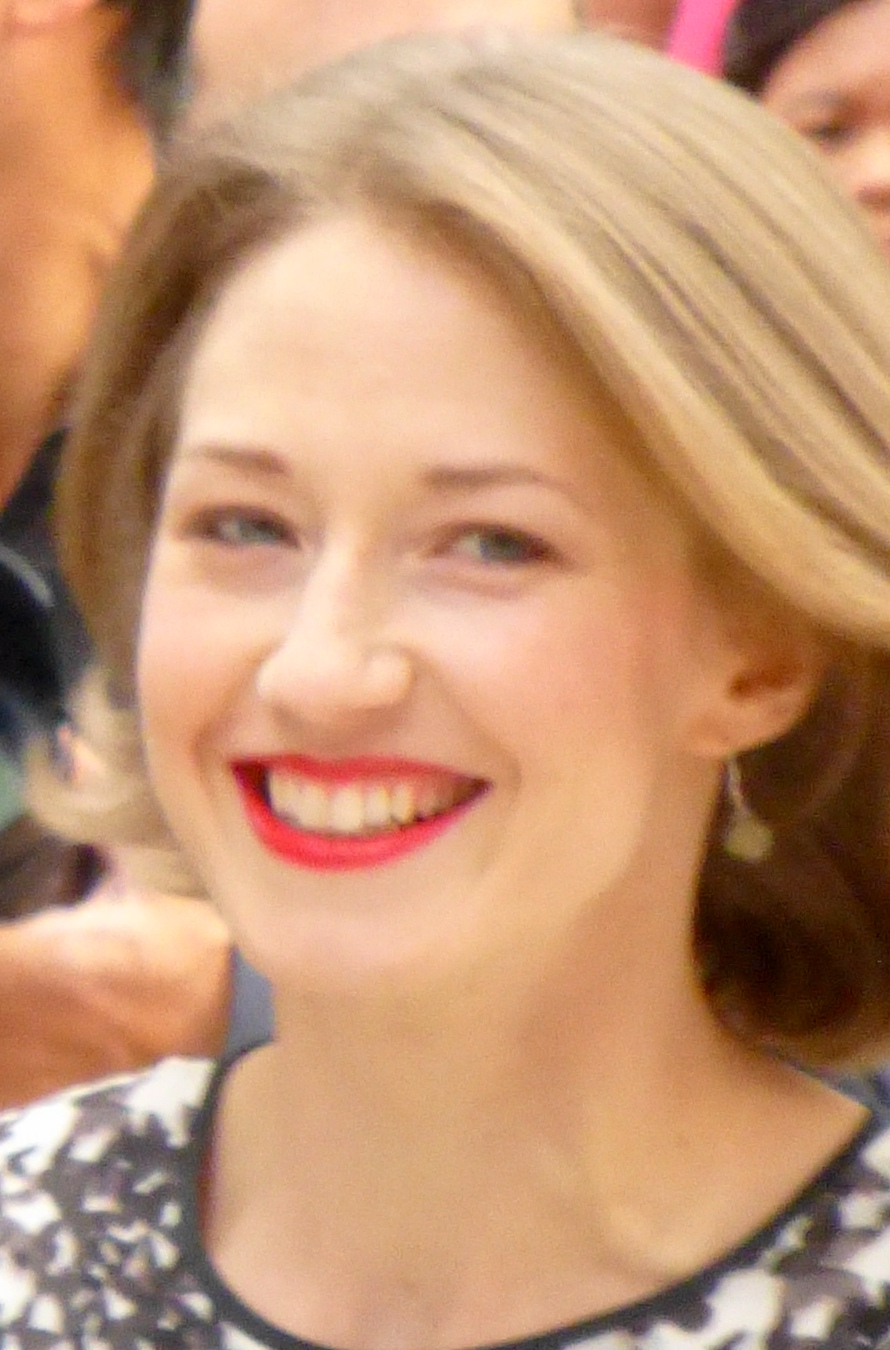
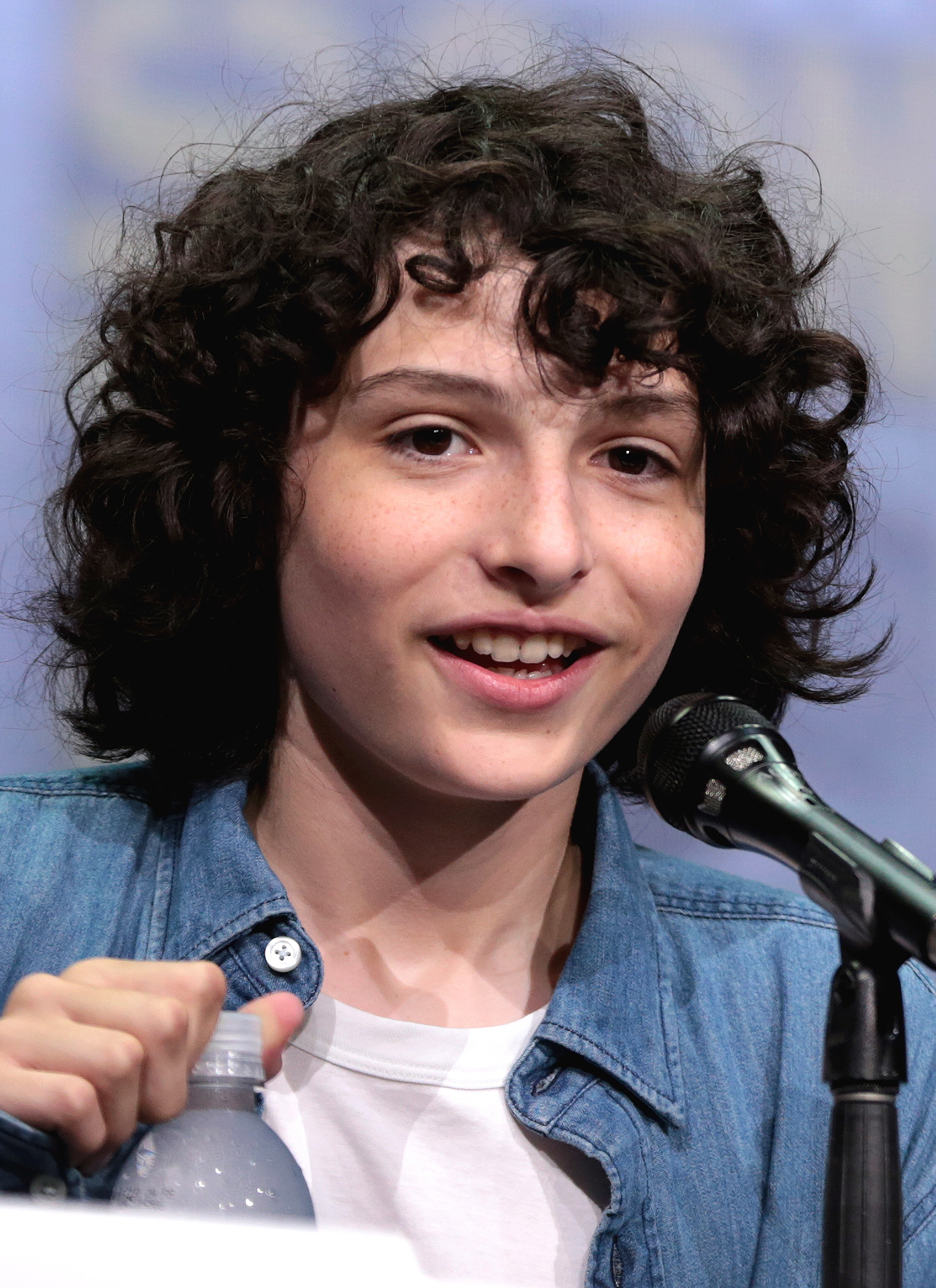
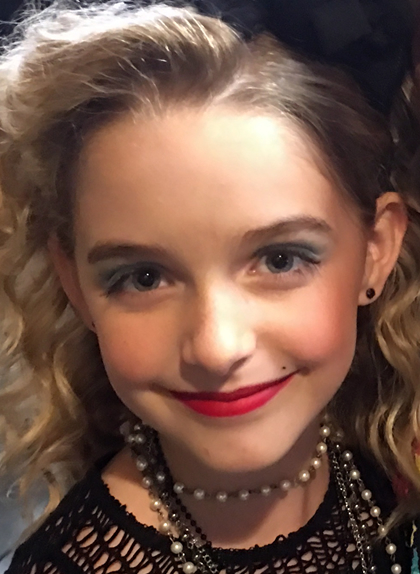
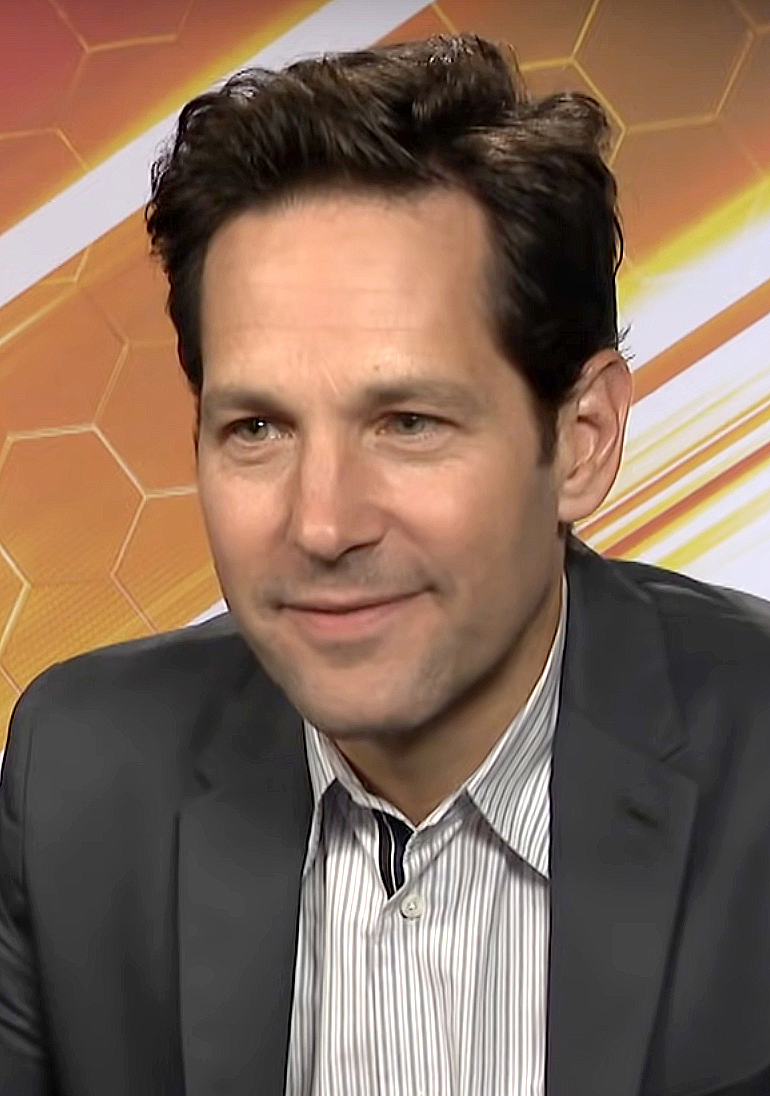
Top: Left to right: Carrie Coon (2013), Finn Wolfhard (2017)
Bottom: Mckenna Grace (2017) Paul Rudd (2018)
- Carrie Coon as Callie Spengler, Phoebe and Trevor's mother
- Finn Wolfhard as Trevor Spengler Callie and Phoebe's brother
- Mckenna Grace as Phoebe Spengler
- Bokeem Woodbine as Sherman Domingo, the sheriff of Summerville
- Paul Rudd as Gary Grooberson as Callie's boyfriend Trevor and Phoebe's teacher
- Logan Kim as Podcast
- Celeste O'Connor as Lucky Domingo, a friend of Trevor's and Sheriff Domingo's daughter
- Bill Murray as Peter Venkman
- Dan Aykroyd as Ray Stantz
- Ernie Hudson as Winston Zeddemore
- Annie Potts as Janine Melnitz
- Sigourney Weaver as Dana Barrett

The film's cast additionally includes Marlon Kazadi as Thickneck; Sydney Mae Diaz as Swayze; and Aykroyd's youngest daughter Stella as Deputy Medjuck, a nod to Joe Medjuck, who was an associate producer on Ghostbusters (1984), an executive producer on the subsequent films and a co-founder of production company Ghost Corps. Harold Ramis posthumously appears as Egon Spengler in archived clips and photographs. Bob Gunton (credited as "The Ghost Farmer") additionally portrayed living and ghostly versions of Egon, using prosthetics and digital makeup respectively, with Ivan Reitman standing in for the latter in some shots. J. K. Simmons portrayed Ivo Shandor, the leader of a Gozer-worshiping cult responsible for Gozer's presences in the modern world. Simmons took the role as a token of friendship with the Reitmans, with whom he frequently collaborates in films like Jason's Juno and Father Figures, co-produced by Ivan. Olivia Wilde, who portrayed Mesopotamian deity Inanna in Ramis' final film Year One, physically portrayed Gozer, previously portrayed by Slavitza Jovan and Paddi Edwards in voice in the original film, with Shohreh Aghdashloo providing the character's voice and Emma Portner portraying her spiritual form. Josh Gad was one of many actors who contributed to the voice of Muncher, a metal-eating ghost of a miner conjured after a séance went wrong at Summerville's local foundry in the 1940s. Ira Heiden (a friend of Jason Reitman's), Sarah Natochenny and Shelby Young provided the vocal effects of the Mini-Pufts, miniature doppelgängers of the Stay Puft Marshmallow Man, but were not credited for their performances.

== Production ==
=== Development ===
==== As Ghostbusters III ====
In the early 1990s, following the release of Ghostbusters II, Dan Aykroyd wrote a script for a third Ghostbusters film tentatively titled Ghostbusters III: Hellbent. In the script, the Ghostbusters are transported to a parallel-universe version of Manhattan called Manhellton, where the people and places are "hellish" versions of Earth, and the characters meet and confront the Devil. At the time, Aykroyd stated that Columbia Pictures was interested, though the principal actors, especially Bill Murray, were not. The Hellbent script's main characters are a new, younger group of Ghostbusters; Ray, Egon and Winston struggle to keep the business going after Peter's relationship with Dana becomes serious. Elements of this story were used in Ghostbusters: The Video Game (2009), which Aykroyd considered to be "essentially the third movie". At various stages of its development, Chris Farley, Chris Rock and Ben Stiller were reported as potential stars of a new Ghostbusters film.

By 2004, Columbia had begun pursuing a sequel but Murray, who disliked sequels, was uninterested in the project. The following year, Harold Ramis confirmed plans to introduce Stiller into the principal cast. By 2009, the project had failed to progress, but by January 2010, Ivan Reitman, director of the first two Ghostbusters films, confirmed he would direct a third one. Also in March, Murray discussed development of the film and his mixed feelings about reprising his role. A release was scheduled for Christmas 2012. That October, Aykroyd commented on the screenplay written by Gene Stupnitsky and Lee Eisenberg, stating that he was particularly impressed with the writing of Murray's character and the implementation of the new team with the original while he and Ramis worked on a second draft of the script.

By August 2011, Aykroyd stated that filming was scheduled to begin later that year with a story focused on passing the Ghostbusters mantle to the younger actors. When Murray decided against reprising his role, Aykroyd said another actor might replace him. Aykroyd also said he wanted retired actor Rick Moranis to return as Louis Tully. By February 2012, the film was placed on hold as the production team re-evaluated the project. Without Murray, the studio searched for replacement actors and considered including his character as a CGI-rendered ghost. In June, Murray again acknowledged all involved were attempting to develop the third film before dropping out of the film the following month. In July, Aykroyd confirmed the film was back in development with a script re-write from Etan Cohen. Aykroyd said of the script: "It's got to be perfect. That's the whole thing. There's no point in doing it unless it's perfect. So that's what we're up to now." By September, Reitman announced the developments of a remake. In May 2013, Aykroyd discussed plot points including real experiments being done by college students at Columbia University as a source of inspiration. The plot would revolve around research being done by the university, which would bring about threats from other dimensions. A new team of Ghostbusters would form to save Earth's plane of existence from supernatural threats. The script reportedly included Murray's character with hopes Murray would decide to join the production.

Following the death of Ramis on February 24, 2014, Sony/Columbia stated that Ramis would appear in a cameo appearance in the film. The film was delayed again to rework the script. By March 2015, Reitman was no longer attached to direct the third film, but would remain as producer, with plans to begin principal photography by early 2015. Weaver wanted her character's son to feature as a member of the team, and Reitman said he had already been included in the script.

==== As Ghostbusters: Afterlife ====
A new film connected to the original two films was revealed in January 2019. Ivan Reitman's son Jason was confirmed to direct from a script he co-wrote with Gil Kenan while Ivan would serve as a producer. The film would feature teenagers—two males and two females—as the recruits for the Ghostbusters team.

Jason Reitman said the film ignores the events of 2016's Ghostbusters reboot, which was directed by Paul Feig. Reitman said he did not mean to snub the 2016 film and that he had "nothing but admiration" for Feig. Feig said Reitman had been a supporter of his film and that he "can't wait to see his take on the Ghostbusters universe". Reitman later said the idea of a teenage girl wanting to be a Ghostbuster had come to him, and with a positive reaction from Feig's film, proved the idea that anyone could be a Ghostbuster would work. Reitman also said the Ghostbusters franchise could readily expand on this idea with all types of people becoming Ghostbusters, personally thanking Feig for making this possible. Reitman considered, unlike the three prior Ghostbusters films—all of which involve people going into the ghostbusting business—he wanted to make this film about family first. With Kenan, Reitman created a script based around the Spengler family and the reason they are so disconnected. According to Dan Aykroyd, "Jason Reitman wrote a beautiful, heartfelt script that takes the real DNA from the first two movies and transfers that directly to the third, the next generation. It hands the legacy off to a new generation of stars, players, actors, and characters." Murray, who was also confirmed to be reprising Peter Venkman, was positive about the script. Ramis's daughter Violet (whom Reitman befriended during the filming of the first film), gave her blessing after reading an early version of the screenplay, saying that the story "captures the spirit of what the old movies are". She occasionally visited the sets and was (at the insistence of Reitman and propmaster Guillaume DeLouche) photographed wearing her late father's proton pack prop from the first film while prop makers from The Hand Prop Room in Los Angeles were building lighter replicas of it for Mckenna Grace to wear.

With a script centered around family, Reitman felt it was appropriate to change the backdrop from New York City to the American West to give the film a new identity and a different color palette. The script was structured to slowly reveal the connection to the Egon Spengler character, which would bring in elements of earlier Ghostbusters films. For example, the film sees Aykroyd's character return to running Ray's Occult Books, as seen in Ghostbusters II, but only the events of the original film are directly referenced.

=== Casting ===
The castings of Mckenna Grace as the young female protagonist, Finn Wolfhard as her brother, and Carrie Coon as their single mother were revealed in March 2019. Reitman described Grace as an avid fan of the series and a perfect fit for his concept of a teenage female Ghostbuster. Wolfhard, who had dressed as a Ghostbuster while in character as Mike Wheeler during the second season of Stranger Things, was unsure he would get the role, saying that "Jason Reitman is probably not even going to look at my tape" because of that. Paul Rudd was cast in the film in June, later confirming his role of Mr. Grooberson, the children's new teacher who knows of the Ghostbusters' legacy. Rudd himself had worked with Harold Ramis in an uncredited role for his final film Year One.

Newcomers Celeste O'Connor and Logan Kim were cast in July. Bill Murray, Dan Aykroyd, Ernie Hudson, Sigourney Weaver, and Annie Potts were confirmed to be reprising their roles from the first two Ghostbusters films. Rick Moranis, who also appeared in the first two Ghostbusters films, did not return to reprise his role in the film.

=== Design ===
Reitman shot on location and relied on practical effect as much as possible to maintain stylistic continuity with the original films. The Spengler farmhouse was a practical set built on a ridge that recalled the Psycho house. An old barn was relocated and reconstructed piece-by-piece on location for the unveiling of Ecto-1. Two Ectomobiles were used during filming. While the vehicles were vintage 1959 Cadillac Miller-Meteor Sentinels, modern performance engines and suspension upgrades were required to complete the stunt sequences which were filmed on real city streets.

==== Creature effects ====
Reitman and the production crew reviewed the designs of the original film's ghosts and other supernatural creatures for use in Afterlife, observing the designs looked different from each other and were distinct. The creature known as "Muncher", co-created by creature designer Brynn Metheney, is similar to Slimer; Reitman explained: "Something happened to Slimer over the years that people started thinking of him as the dalmatian of the firehouse. The original Slimer was an angry dude and very scary and we wanted to get back to that", and Metheney wanted to make Muncher whom "the audience can latch on to" easily, giving him a universal appeal of him being "funny and cool and cute and weird in every way" like Slimer yet completely new and different from his green predecessor. Though the film did not reveal Muncher's origin, Metheney's character personality reveals that the ghost in life was a miner "conjured into existence by a séance gone wrong in the 1940s" at Summerville Foundry's supervisor's office and he has haunted the plant ever since then, "after terrorizing the group that contacted him". Her most ambitious design was the Mini-Pufts; she wanted to give them a realistic look on scale and texture of authentic marshmallows than the colossal Stay Puft Marshmallow Man and even bought packages of them to make tiny marshmallow men for visual reference. For the scenes of Summerville Crossrip, Metheney created the "flaming phantasms" that chase a firetruck and pedestrians outside the Spinners Roller Hop and included the animated series The Real Ghostbusters' popular three-eye ghost Bug-Eye in homage to the show. Other apparition concepts that did not make the final cut include a rancher ghost, Louise the crossing guard ghost of Summerville Middle School, possessed balloons and sandwiches, and more miner ghosts (Dynamite, Pick Axe, Lunchbox, Coats, and Shovel) after Muncher. Creature effects designer Arjen Tuiten, who is a fan of the first film's special effects artist Steve Johnson, personally created the "Old Miner Ghost" in resemblance to his idol's "Zombie Taxi Ghost" without Metheney's involvement.

Egon's Aztec Death Whistle was designed by Landon Lott under Jason Reitman's instruction, and despite the claim in the film that whistles like it are "designed to ward off evil spirits", their actual purpose remains unclear.

Ramis's likeness was recreated with digital makeup created by Pier Lefebvre and his team at Moving Picture Company (MPC) Film in Los Angeles, scanned from his appearance in the original films to create his digital double with alterations on it based on several photographs taken before his death and footage of him being aged. Bob Gunton and Ivan Reitman (his right hand holding Mckenna Grace's to steady the barrel of a proton pack's neutron wand) physically performed the role. Special effects technicians and puppeteers, including Ronald Binion (suit puppeteer for Slimer in the 2016 Ghostbusters film), portrayed Egon's poltergeist by puppeteering objects and lights in his house and storm-cellar laboratory.

=== Filming ===
Principal photography began on July 12, 2019, under the working title Rust City, in and around Calgary, Alberta, and lasted until October. Location filming occurred in surrounding communities such as Crossfield, Beiseker, Drumheller and Fort Macleod (Muncher chase scene) during July and August. Other locations around Alberta were also used. Filming wrapped on October 18.

== Music ==
The score for Ghostbusters: Afterlife was composed by Rob Simonsen and conducted by William Ross and Anthony Parnther. Simonsen studied Elmer Bernstein's score for the first Ghostbusters film and recruited Bernstein's son Peter, who guided the orchestration of Simonsen's score and the use of material from Ghostbusters (1984), as a score consultant. Simonsen used the ondes martenot throughout the score, which was played by Cynthia Millar, who played the same instrument on Bernstein's 1984 Ghostbusters score. The soundtrack was released on Compact Disc on November 19, 2021.

The songs "Ghostbusters", which was performed by Ray Parker Jr., and "Haunted House", which was written and performed by Mckenna Grace are heard during the film's end credits. The songs "The Clapping Song" by Shirley Ellis, "Baby It's You" by The Shirelles, "Can You Get to That" by Funkadelic, "Boredom" by Buzzcocks, "All Your Love (I Miss Loving)" by Otis Rush, "Muddy Water" by The Delmore Brothers, "Wait a Minute Girl" by The Newday, "Foolish Try" by Kelly's Lot, and "On the Road Again" by Willie Nelson are used in the film.

== Release ==
=== Theatrical ===
Ghostbusters: Afterlife was originally scheduled to be released in the United States on July 10, 2020, by Sony Pictures Releasing but its release was postponed to March 5, 2021, due to the COVID-19 pandemic. Sony pushed the film to June 11, 2021, then later shifted the release to November 11, 2021. The film's release was again postponed to November 19. The film was dedicated to Ramis and executive producer Tom Pollock (who died shortly before its completion), and the former is commemorated before its closing credits.

The film was given a surprise screening on August 23 during the 2021 CinemaCon event in Las Vegas; and another for fans at the 2021 New York Comic Con.

=== Marketing ===
In August 2019, toy manufacturer and multimedia company Hasbro obtained the master toy license for the Ghostbusters franchise, with the new products (including action figures and role-play items) originally scheduled to be released in stores in April 2020. Because of the pandemic delays to the film's release date, the introduction of Ghostbusters: Afterlife toys to market was also delayed. Target received exclusive versions of some toys ahead of the projected June 2021 release date, but further rollouts were held back when the studio announced an additional delay until November. A new line of Hasbro action figures based on the film was unveiled on the same day the second trailer debuted. It included several characters and costumes that had not been seen in any promotional material for the film before. In November, Zaxby's promoted the film with a commercial featuring Ghostbusters: Afterlife's Mini-Pufts.

=== Home media ===
Following the film's theatrical screenings, it was released digitally on January 4, 2022, and on DVD, Blu-ray, and Ultra HD Blu-ray on February 1 in North America.

After its digital release on PVOD services, the film acquired the top position on iTunes and Vudu, while being placed second on Google Play. Overall, it spent four weeks at the top position on iTunes and Vudu, while spending five weeks at the top rank on Google Play. The film debuted at the second position on Redbox's digital chart. It was the top-selling digital title on "Redbox On Demand" for four consecutive weeks.

After debuting on disc, it acquired the top position on the "NPD VideoScan First Alert" chart which tracks combined DVD and Blu-ray sales. It sold 285,642 units overall for $5.3 million. It maintained its position in the overall sales for the following week, while being displaced from the top position in the Blu-ray sales by Encanto. It was also the most-rented film from Redbox kiosks for three consecutive weeks. The film was the highest-selling title for February according to the "NPD VideoScan First Alert" chart.

In April 2021, Sony signed a deal with Disney giving them access to their legacy content, including past Ghostbusters films, including Ghostbusters: Afterlife to stream on Disney+ and Hulu and appear on Disney's linear television networks. Disney's access to Sony's titles would come following their availability on Netflix.

== Reception ==
=== Box office ===
Ghostbusters: Afterlife grossed $129.4 million in the United States and Canada, and $75 million in other territories, grossing $204.3 million worldwide. Scott Mendelson of Forbes described the film's theatrical run as "relatively successful" and said it was "made cheaply enough to be a hit".

In the United States and Canada, Ghostbusters: Afterlife was released alongside King Richard, and earned $16.6 million on its first day—including $4.5 million from Thursday night previews, $1 million more than the 2016 film. The film debuted to revenues of $44 million, topping the box office. It made $5.3 million on Thanksgiving and $24.2 million in its second weekend, finishing second behind newcomer Encanto.

In its third weekend, the film earned $10.35 million and exceeded $100 million in the U.S. and Canada. In its fourth weekend, the film dropped to third place at the box office and earned $7.1 million. It made $3.4 million in its fifth weekend, placing fourth, and $1.2 million in its sixth, finishing eleventh. The film returned to the box-office top ten in its seventh weekend, earning $1.5 million and finishing seventh. In its eighth weekend, the film made $1.1 million and finished eighth. The film returned to the box office top ten in its eleventh weekend, earning $776,451 and finishing eighth.

Paul Dergarabedian of Comscore said Ghostbusters: Afterlife opened to a "really solid number" that showed the "brand is really powerful even some 37 years after the original became a cultural phenomenon". The Associated Press noted the "crucial difference" between this film and the 2016 reboot is that Ghostbusters: Afterlife "cost about half as much to make". Variety described the film's opening weekend box office as "stronger than expected" and "an important victory for the studio after it failed in 2016 to revive the decades-old series".

=== Critical response ===
On the review aggregator website Rotten Tomatoes, 63% of 309 critics' reviews are positive, with an average rating of 6.1/10. The site's critical consensus reads, "Ghostbusters: Afterlife crosses the streams between franchise revival and exercise in nostalgia – and this time around, the bustin' mostly feels good." Metacritic, which uses a weighted average, assigned the film a score of 45 out of 100 based on 47 critics, indicating "mixed or average" reviews. Audiences polled by CinemaScore gave the film an average grade of "A−" on an A+ to F scale, while those at PostTrak gave it an 82% positive score, and 69% said they would recommend it.

Sheri Linden of The Hollywood Reporter described the film's cast as "engaging" and "[having] the comic beats down", and added that "they also play more fully fleshed people than the first film offered, reflecting the director's interest in character-driven stories". She also noted some similarities between the film and Stranger Things, The Wizard of Oz and Close Encounters of the Third Kind. Olly Richards of Empire gave the film a score of four out of five, describing it as "thoroughly lovely" and saying it "firmly establishes its own new generation" while being "full of love for the originals". Peter Debruge of Variety described it as an "unnecessary but enjoyable movie", and added, "The good news for Ghostbusters fans is that Afterlife does nothing to tarnish what has come before".

William Bibbiani of TheWrap commented that Ghostbusters: Afterlife will probably satisfy fans of Ghostbusters (1984)—particularly those who like finding Easter eggs—but might disappoint viewers who want it to offer something different; but these could still enjoy the film's "slick and straightforward, formulaic craftsmanship". Scott Mendelson of Forbes gave the film a score of 6 out of 10, describing it as a "charming and witty kid-centric coming-of-age fantasy", but criticized its reliance on "pandering" nostalgic fanservice. Kyle Smith of National Review described the film as "a winsome, endearing summer movie for November, a cunningly engineered generational bridge". The Guardian critic Charles Bramesco gave it one out of five, finding it lacks the humor of Ghostbusters (1984) and instead resembles an "Amblin knockoff" that is similar to the television series Stranger Things. Bramensco concluded it is "a nostalgia object, drained of personality and fitted into a dully palatable mold, custom-made for a fandom that worships everything and respects nothing".

=== Accolades ===
Award	Date of ceremony	Category	Recipients	Result	Ref.
Alliance of Women Film Journalists	January 2022	Sequel or Remake That Shouldn't Have Been Made	Ghostbusters: Afterlife	Nominated	
Art Directors Guild Awards	March 5, 2022	Excellence in Production Design for a Fantasy Film	François Audouy	Nominated	
British Academy Film Awards	March 13, 2022	Best Special Visual Effects	Aharon Bourland, Sheena Duggal, Pier Lefebvre and Alessandro Ongaro	Nominated	
International Film Music Critics Association Awards	February 17, 2022	Best Original Score for a Fantasy, Science Fiction or Horror Film	Rob Simonsen	Nominated	
Las Vegas Film Critics Society Awards	December 13, 2021	Best Visual Effects	Ghostbusters: Afterlife	Nominated	
Las Vegas Film Critics Society Awards	December 13, 2021	Youth in Film - Female	Mckenna Grace	Nominated	
Critics' Choice Super Awards	March 17, 2022	Best Actress in a Science Fiction or Fantasy Movie	Mckenna Grace	Nominated	
Music City Film Critics Association Awards	January 25, 2022	Best Young Actress	Mckenna Grace	Nominated	
San Diego Film Critics Society Awards	January 10, 2022	Best Youth Performance	Mckenna Grace	Runner-up	
Sunset Circle Awards	December 2, 2021	Best Family Film	Ghostbusters: Afterlife	Nominated	
Saturn Awards	October 25, 2022	Best Performance by a Younger Actor	Finn Wolfhard	Won	
Saturn Awards	October 25, 2022	Best Fantasy Film	Ghostbusters: Afterlife	Nominated	
Saturn Awards	October 25, 2022	Best Supporting Actress in a Film	Carrie Coon	Nominated	
Saturn Awards	October 25, 2022	Best Film Special / Visual Effects	Sheena Duggal and Alessandro Ongaro	Nominated	

== Franchise ==
=== Sequel ===
Aykroyd has expressed interest in having the surviving cast members of the original Ghostbusters film reprise their roles in up to three sequels. On the possibility of sequels, David A. Gross of Franchise Entertainment Research said the box-office results were "excellent" and would "encourage Sony to forge ahead with new installments". In April 2022, a sequel was confirmed to be in early development and it would return to New York City as with prior installments. Grace reprises her role, as well as Logan Kim, Celeste O’Connor, Bill Murray, Dan Aykroyd, Ernie Hudson, and Annie Potts.

In December, Gil Kenan took over as director from Reitman, who remains a writer and producer. Rudd, Wolfhard, and Coon were also confirmed to reprise their roles alongside Grace. On March 20, 2023, a photo of Reitman and Kenan was posted to the Ghostbusters Facebook page showing them on the set of the new movie, with the working title Firehouse. The film was released on March 22, 2024.

=== Upcoming animated film ===
A separate animated film from Sony Pictures Animation was also announced to be in development, to be directed by Chris Prynoski and Jennifer Kluska, and written by Brenda Hsueh.
