= Janine Melnitz =

Fictional character from Ghostbusters

- Annie Potts as Janine Melnitz in Ghostbusters (1984)
- First appearance: Ghostbusters (1984)
- Created by: Dan Aykroyd; Harold Ramis
- Portrayed by: Annie Potts
- Voiced by: Annie Potts (The Video Game); Laura Summer (The Real Ghostbusters; seasons 1–2); Kath Soucie (The Real Ghostbusters; seasons 3–7); Pat Musick (Extreme Ghostbusters)

In-universe information
- Species: Human
- Gender: Female
- Occupation: Secretary; Ghostbuster
- Nationality: American

Janine Melnitz is a fictional character in the Ghostbusters franchise. She is the Ghostbusters' secretary and confidante and, occasionally, a ghostbuster herself. Janine Melnitz debuted in the film Ghostbusters (1984), portrayed by Annie Potts, who would return for Ghostbusters II (1989).

Laura Summer initially voiced the character in the animated series The Real Ghostbusters, and later on Kath Soucie voiced the character. In Extreme Ghostbusters, she was voiced by Pat Musick. Potts reprised the role for Ghostbusters: The Video Game (2009), Ghostbusters: Afterlife (2021) and Ghostbusters: Frozen Empire (2024), and had a cameo as a similar hotel receptionist in the 2016 remake.

== Personal life ==
Throughout most Ghostbusters media, Janine is often displayed as having a romantic attraction to Egon Spengler. This is shown in the original movie and the 2021 film Ghostbusters: Afterlife, and more prominently in The Real Ghostbusters. In Ghostbusters II, however, she becomes involved with Louis Tully, who has become the team's financial advisor and lawyer. Despite this, Janine retains her attraction to Egon throughout the entire Real Ghostbusters series and into the Extreme Ghostbusters series.

In "Janine's Genie", in which Janine encounters an evil genie after receiving a possessed lamp (unaware that the genie is evil), one of her wishes is for Egon to fall in love with her, and in one instance when she is driving Ecto-1, Egon comments, "Janine, you're beautiful when you drive." Egon and Janine share a handful of tender moments throughout the series, but Egon's somewhat stilted emotions often create a barrier between them.

== Appearances ==
=== Ghostbusters ===
In Ghostbusters, Janine is hired as the secretary of the Ghostbusters, managing their business affairs and greeting walk-in clients. She reads and plays racquetball in her spare time. Once the company's workload starts to grow, she remarks at one point that she has been working for two weeks straight without a break and says sourly, "I've quit better jobs than this."

In the film's novelization, it is stated that she helped design the Ghostbusters' "no ghost allowed" logo. She also interviews Winston Zeddemore for the job as the fourth member of the team. Later, she helps Egon interview Louis Tully, who was possessed by Vinz Clortho, the Keymaster of Gozer. After the battle with Gozer, she is seen outside of 55 Central Park West, hugging Egon, happy to see him alive and well, joining the rest of the Ghostbusters as they drive off in the Ecto-1.

=== The Real Ghostbusters ===
Janine is the youngest daughter of a working-class family from Brooklyn. Though her parents, sister, nephew, and grandmother all live in Canarsie (as seen in "Janine's Day Off"), she has remained in Brooklyn Heights, where she grew up. She tends to wear loud, blocky jewelry and (in early seasons) a miniskirt at work.

In 1987, Janine owns a red Volkswagen Beetle convertible, which is severely damaged after being loaned to the Ghostbusters in "Beneath These Streets". In "Baby Spookums", she has a yellow Renault 5 Le Car, although it is not known if this is a loaner/rental or her own car; in later instances, she owns a pink Beetle convertible.

On numerous occasions, Janine has taken up a proton pack, and usually a jumpsuit, to help the Ghostbusters in episodes including "Janine's Genie", "Mr. Sandman, Dream Me a Dream", "Janine’s Day Off", "Janine Melnitz, Ghostbuster", and "Jailbusters". However, her jumpsuit color has never been consistent. For example, in "Janine's Genie", it is brownish-orange, similar to Venkman's but lighter. In "Mr. Sandman, Dream Me a Dream", it is a very pale pink, nearly white. In "Janine’s Day Off", she does not wear a jumpsuit at all, just a proton pack. In the episode "Janine Melnitz, Ghostbuster", she borrows one of Peter Venkman's uniforms, and in the Extreme Ghostbusters episode "A Temporary Insanity", she borrows one of Egon Spengler's.

She has a sharp, sarcastic sense of humor and has been known to make jokes about the Ghostbusters, either to their faces or under her breath, but most of the time, she usually gets along with Ray and Winston while usually having a kind of sibling rivalry with Peter.

==== Changes in The Real Ghostbusters ====
Significant changes to the character occurred over the course of The Real Ghostbusters. In the first two seasons, her portrayal is almost identical to the rude secretary Potts portrayed in the film. However, the production of season 3 (ABC season 2) saw Kath Soucie replace Laura Summer as Janine's voice actor. Notably, her marked Brooklyn accent disappeared. Her appearance and personality were also "softened". After the release of Ghostbusters II, her appearance was revised again to match her appearance in that movie.

In the Season 6 episode "Janine, You've Changed", it is revealed that the changes of the past three years were the result of her wishes to a "makeoveris lotsabucks", a demon posing as a fairy godmother (and even referred to as such by Janine herself). This was one of a handful of episodes writer J. Michael Straczynski wrote as a favor to the show's producers since he could not return as a full-time writer due to other working commitments he had at the time. As such, the demon fed off of Janine's insecurity regarding her looks and frustration in failing to win Egon's heart. The demon used her magic to blind Egon (and the other Ghostbusters) to Janine's changes, thus making Janine more dependent on the demon for "improvements" to her appearance in hopes she would become "perfect", making Egon notice her. Unknown to Janine, the demon was feeding on her desire to be "perfect" for Egon to slowly strip away her humanity and turn her into a "makeoveris lotsabucks" herself.

None of the Ghostbusters noticed until Slimer showed them pictures of Janine in their photo album. They demonstrated her startling changes over the years with a hologram projector. The demon had used ectoplasmic energy to alter Janine's cellular and bone structure. When Janine leaves the firehouse to meet the demon alone, the Ghostbusters send Slimer to go after her. In the car, Egon tells the others, just as he's realizing how much Janine means to him, now he could lose her forever. In the climax of the episode, Janine turns into a "makeoverus lotsabucks" with powers similar to those of her "fairy godmother" (allowing her to change her own appearance at will). She lashes out at Egon when he comes to her rescue, blaming him for hardly ever acknowledging her affection for him. Egon defeats the demon's hold over Janine by confessing his love for her (the NOW and Marvel UK comics ignore these changes). Egon's confession proves sincere (and is not just a way of defeating the demon) since he and Janine are later seen sitting on a bench together, watching the sunrise. It is here Egon puts his arm around Janine and asks her out on a date.

Janine's character was changed at the suggestion of consultants, who said that they wanted to change the shape of Janine's glasses (which they thought would frighten children) and change her from a feisty character to the "mother" of the Ghostbusters group since they felt she was "too abrasive". Additionally, the Brooklyn accent was discarded with a change in voice actresses. This, among other reasons, was why writer J. Michael Straczynski left The Real Ghostbusters.

=== Ghostbusters II ===
In Ghostbusters II, she is rehired as secretary by the Ghostbusters, working side by side with Louis Tully, who has become the team's financial advisor, accountant, and lawyer. At some point prior to the film, she dyed her hair red (to match the appearance of the animated iteration of the character from The Real Ghostbusters), Peter Venkman assigns her to babysit Dana Barrett's baby, Oscar. She asks Louis Tully to babysit with her, and she, along with Dana and Louis, sees Oscar being kidnapped by Dana's boss, Janosz Poha. In order to help the guys fight Vigo the Carpathian, she lends Louis one of Egon's spare suits and a spare Proton pack so he can join them in the battle. After the battle, she attends a ceremony to restore the Statue of Liberty, where she and the Ghostbusters are awarded the Key to the City by the mayor.

=== Extreme Ghostbusters ===
Set six years after the series finale of The Real Ghostbusters and Ghostbusters II, Janine has bounced from various jobs since the Ghostbusters closed down in 1991. Having been recently downsized from her last job, she returned to school at the New York City College, and among the various (and unmentioned) courses she is taking is a paranormal one, where she is reunited with Egon, going on to help him form the new team.

=== Ghostbusters: Afterlife ===
Potts reprised her role as Janine in Ghostbusters: Afterlife (2021). In the film, now an elderly woman, Janine informs Egon's daughter, Callie, of her father's death and her inheritance of his decrepit farm in Summerville, Oklahoma. A post-credits scene includes a deleted clip from the original Ghostbusters, in which Janine gives one of her two lucky coins to Egon, followed by a present-day moment in which she looks at the other one before reminiscing with Winston Zeddemore about their Ghostbusters days.

=== Ghostbusters: Frozen Empire ===
Potts again reprised her role as Janine in Ghostbusters: Frozen Empire (2024). In the film, Janine returned being a receptionist to the Ghostbusters and serves as a liaison between them and Zeddemore Industries's paranormal research and development center. She later joined the fight against the horned deity Garraka, wearing her own custom Ghostbusters uniform.

=== Video games ===
Janine has had brief appearances in the Extreme Ghostbusters Game Boy Color game (only released in Europe) and in the Extreme Ghostbusters game Code Ecto-1 for the Game Boy Advance.

Annie Potts reprised her role as Janine in Ghostbusters: The Video Game, once again being the team's secretary, warning them about what's going on, either by calling them or by radio, and making sarcastic comments about the situation. A man named Mark from the Gamble Architectural firm leaves her a message on the Ghostbusters' answering machine, offering her a job as his personal assistant to replace the one he fired during Stay-Puft Marshmallow Man's rampage. Her physical appearance is quite similar to the way she appeared in the second movie, but again being a brunette.

Janine appears as a non-playable character in the Ghostbusters Adventure World of Lego Dimensions, voiced by Courtenay Taylor. She has two missions for the player: The first one has the player bust some ghosts for the mayor, while the second one requires the player to assist her in recovering the books for Ray's bookstore after they're scattered by ghosts.

=== Commercials ===
During the filming of Ghostbusters: Afterlife, Potts also reprised her role as Janine in a series of 2020 commercials for QuickBooks.

== Portrayals ==
In the film series and Ghostbusters: The Video Game, she was portrayed by Annie Potts. In the cartoon series The Real Ghostbusters, she was originally voiced by Laura Summer and later by Kath Soucie. In the cartoon series Extreme Ghostbusters, she is voiced by Pat Musick.
