= Manfred Mohr =

German artist (b.1938)

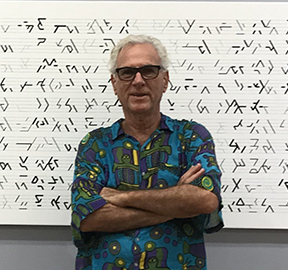
Manfred Mohr posing in front of his work (2019)

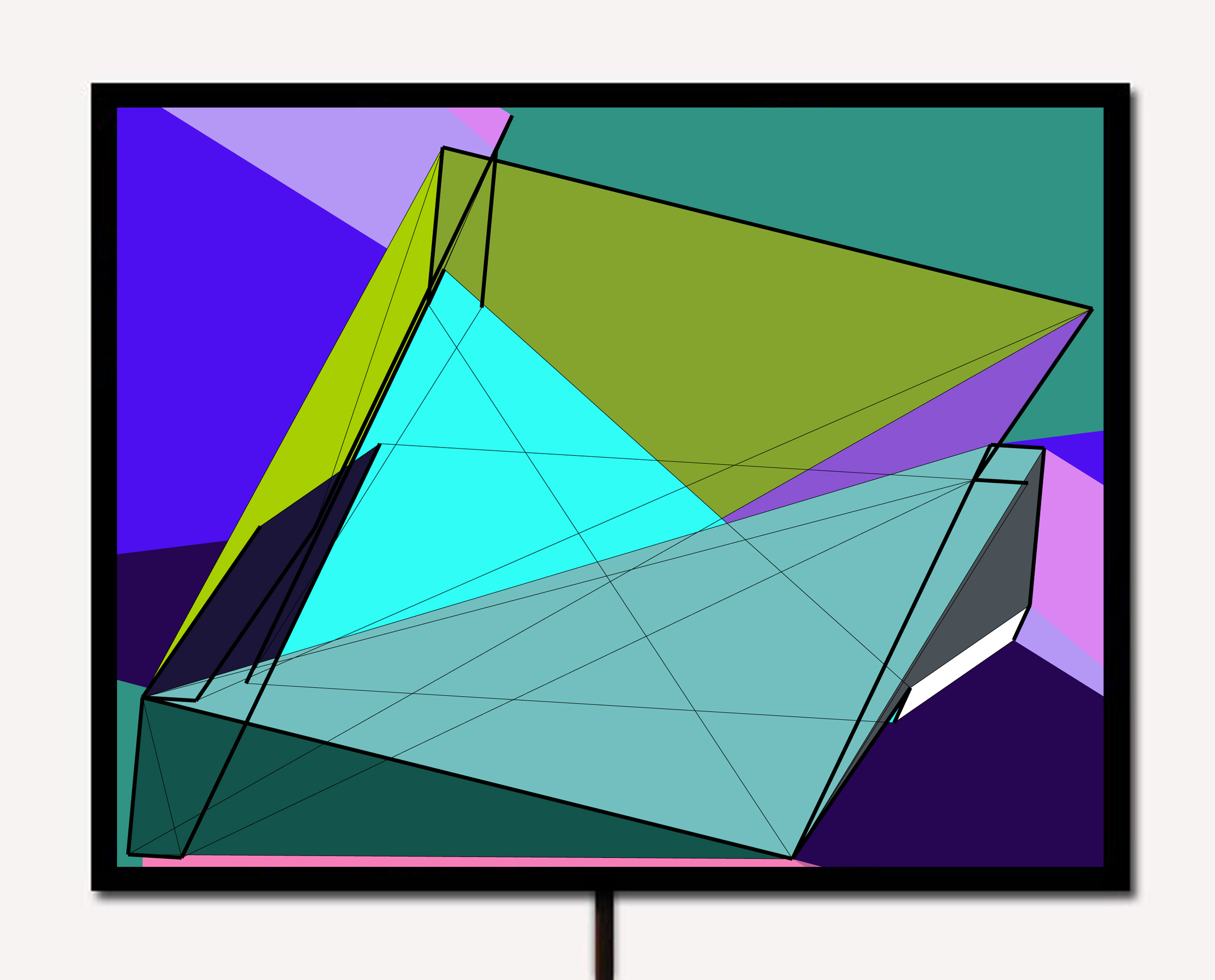
Piece "P-777_D" (2002/04). LCD Screen and PC

Manfred Mohr (born June 8, 1938 in Pforzheim/Germany) is a German artist considered to be a pioneer in the field of digital art. He has lived and worked in New York since 1981.

== Life and career ==
Mohr started his career as an action painter and jazz musician. Inspired by composer Pierre Barbaud, Mohr taught himself programming in 1969 and began creating computer-generated drawings and algorithmic art. He lived in Barcelona in 1962 and in Paris between 1963 and 1983.

His early computer works are algorithmic and based on his former drawings with a strong attitude on rhythm and repetition. In 1990 he was awarded the Prix Ars Electronica (Golden Nica) at the Ars Electronica festival in Linz, Austria. He maintained an art studio in Paris from 1963 to 1983. Mohr attended Kunst + Werkschule in Pforzheim and École des Beaux-Arts in Paris.

In 1968 he co-founded the seminar "Art et Informatique" at the University of Vincennes and in May 1971 had a solo exhibit at ARC – Musée d'Art Moderne de la Ville de Paris. That exhibition has become known historically as the first solo show in a museum of works entirely calculated and drawn by a digital computer.

Recent solo exhibitions of his work include Art Basel "Art Features" with bitforms gallery in Basel, DAM Gallery in Berlin, Mueller-Roth Gallery in Stuttgart, Carroll / Fletcher Gallery in London, bitforms gallery in New York City, Galerie Charlot in Paris, the Museum of Kulturspeicher in Würzburg, and Galerie Wack in Kaiserslautern.

Major retrospectives of his work include ZKM | Media Museum in Karlsruhe in 2013, the Kunsthalle in Bremen in 2007, Joseph Albers Museum in Bottrop, Germany in 1998, and the Wilhelm-Hack-Museum in Ludwigshafen, Germany in 1987.

Mohr's work is collected by the Centre Pompidou in Paris, the Joseph Albers Museum, the Ludwig Museum in Cologne, the Museum for Concret Art in Ingolstadt, the Kunstmuseum Stuttgart, Musee d’Art Contemporain and Musée des Beaux-Arts in Montreal, the Stedelijk Museum in Amsterdam, Musée de l'Élysée in Switzerland, and many others. Mohr has had numerous solo exhibitions in both museums and galleries in New York, Zürich, Cologne, Paris, Amsterdam, Stuttgart, Berlin, Montreal, São Paulo, and Seoul. Additionally, he has participated in group exhibitions at the Leo Castelli Gallery and at the Museum of Modern Art in New York.

Mohr has received many awards including the 2013 ACM SIGGRAPH Distinguished Artist Award for Lifetime Achievement in Digital Art, 2006 (ddaa) Digital Art Award Cologne/Berlin, a fellowship from New York Foundation for the Arts in 1997, the 1990 Golden Nica from Ars Electronica in Linz, the 1990 Camille Graeser Prize in Zürich, and the 1973 Ljubljana Print Biennial. In 1994, the first comprehensive monograph on his work was published by Waser-Verlag in Zürich.

== Studies, exhibitions, and prizes ==
- 1957 – Kunst + Werkschule, Pforzheim (gold- and silversmith, painting); jazz musician (tenor-sax, oboe)
- 1960 – Action painting
- 1961 – Received school prize (art) of the City of Pforzheim
- 1962 – Began the exclusive use of black and white as a means of visual and aesthetic expression
- 1965 – Studied lithography at the Ecole des Beaux Arts, Paris; geometric experiments led to hard edge painting
- 1968 – First one-man exhibition at the Daniel Templon Gallery, Paris; systematization of the picture content
- 1969 – Publication of the visual book Artificiata I. First drawings with a computer.
- 1971 – First one-man show of computer generated digital art in a museum, ARC, Museé d'Art Moderne de la Ville de Paris, Paris / France
- 1972 – Sequential computer drawings were introduced; began to work on fixed structures: the cube
- 1973 – Received awards at the World Print Competition-73, San Francisco, and the 10th Biennial in Ljubljana
- 1977 – Began to work with the 4-D hypercube and graph-theory
- 1980 – Workphase: divisibility, dissection of cube
- 1982 – Quasi-organic growth programs on the cube
- 1987 – First retrospective exhibition, Wilhelm-Hack-Museum, Ludwigshafen; renewed work on the 4-D hypercube; four-dimensional rotation as generator of signs
- 1989 – Extended work to the 5-D and 6-D hypercube. Rotation as well as projection as generators of signs
- 1990 – Received the Golden Nica at Ars Electronica in Linz and the Camille Graeser Prize in Zürich
- 1991 – Workphase: laserglyphs, diagonal paths through 6-D hypercube are cut from steel plates with a laser
- 1994 – The first comprehensive monograph on Manfred Mohr was published by Waser-Verlag, Zürich
- 1997 – Was elected a member of the American Abstract Artists; received an Artists' Fellowship from New York Foundation for the Arts
- 1998 – Started to use color (after using black and white for more than three decades) to show the complexity of the work through differentiation
- 2002 – Designed and built small PCs to run his program "space.color" and since 2004 also the program "subsets". The resulting images were visualized on LCD flat panels in a slow, non-repetitive motion.
- 2006 – Received the [ddaa] Digital Art Award (for digital pioneering- and original geometric research), Köl
- 2013 – Received the ACM SIGGRAPH Distinguished Artist Award for Lifetime Achievement in Digital Art
- 2013 – Honored with retrospective show The Algorithm of Manfred Mohr, 1963-now at ZKM – Media Museum, Karlsruhe
- 2013 – Chosen as Featured Artist in a solo show at ArtBasel/Basel with bitforms gallery

== Gallery ==
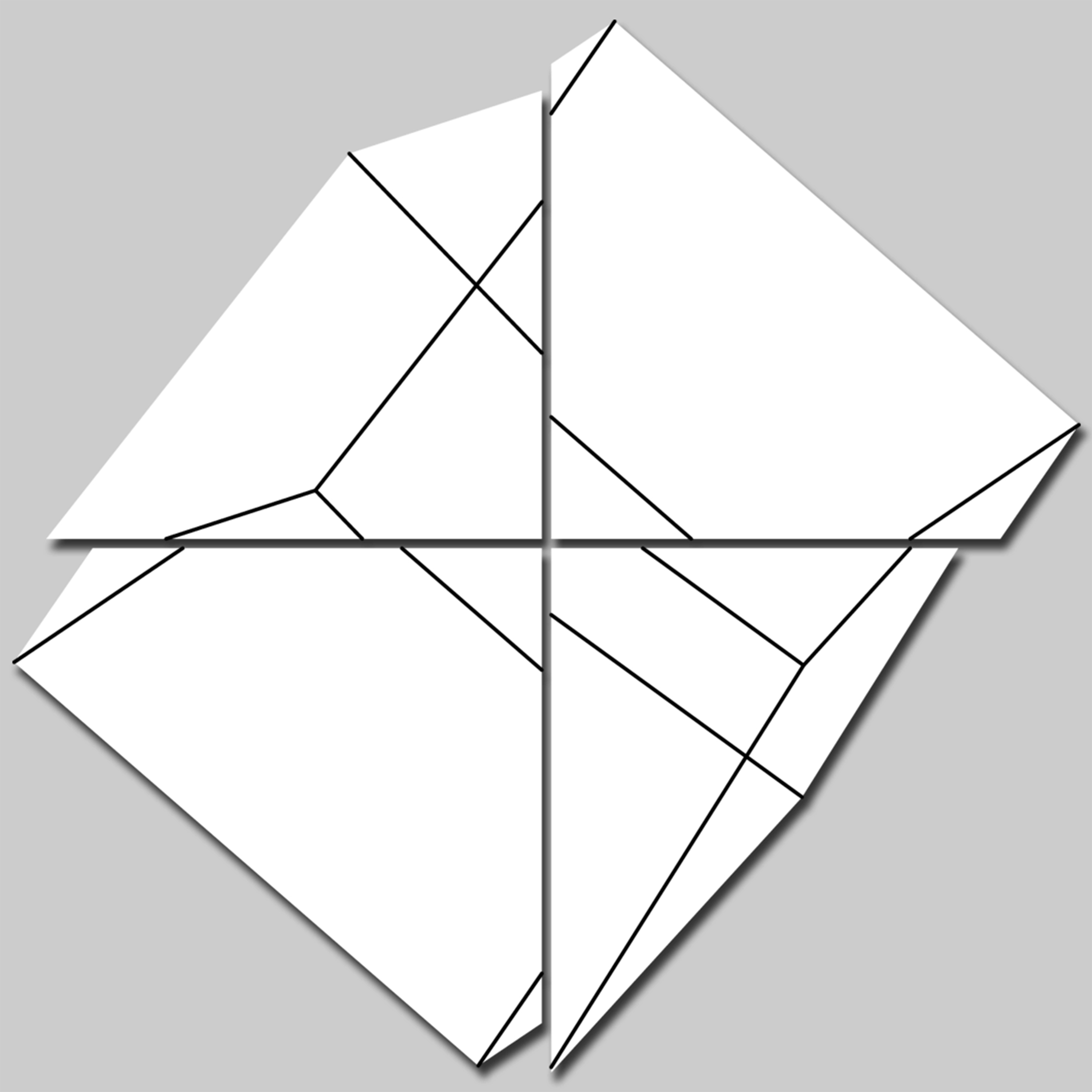
Piece "P-306-O" (1980/82). Acryl/ Canvas/ Wood/ 4 parts

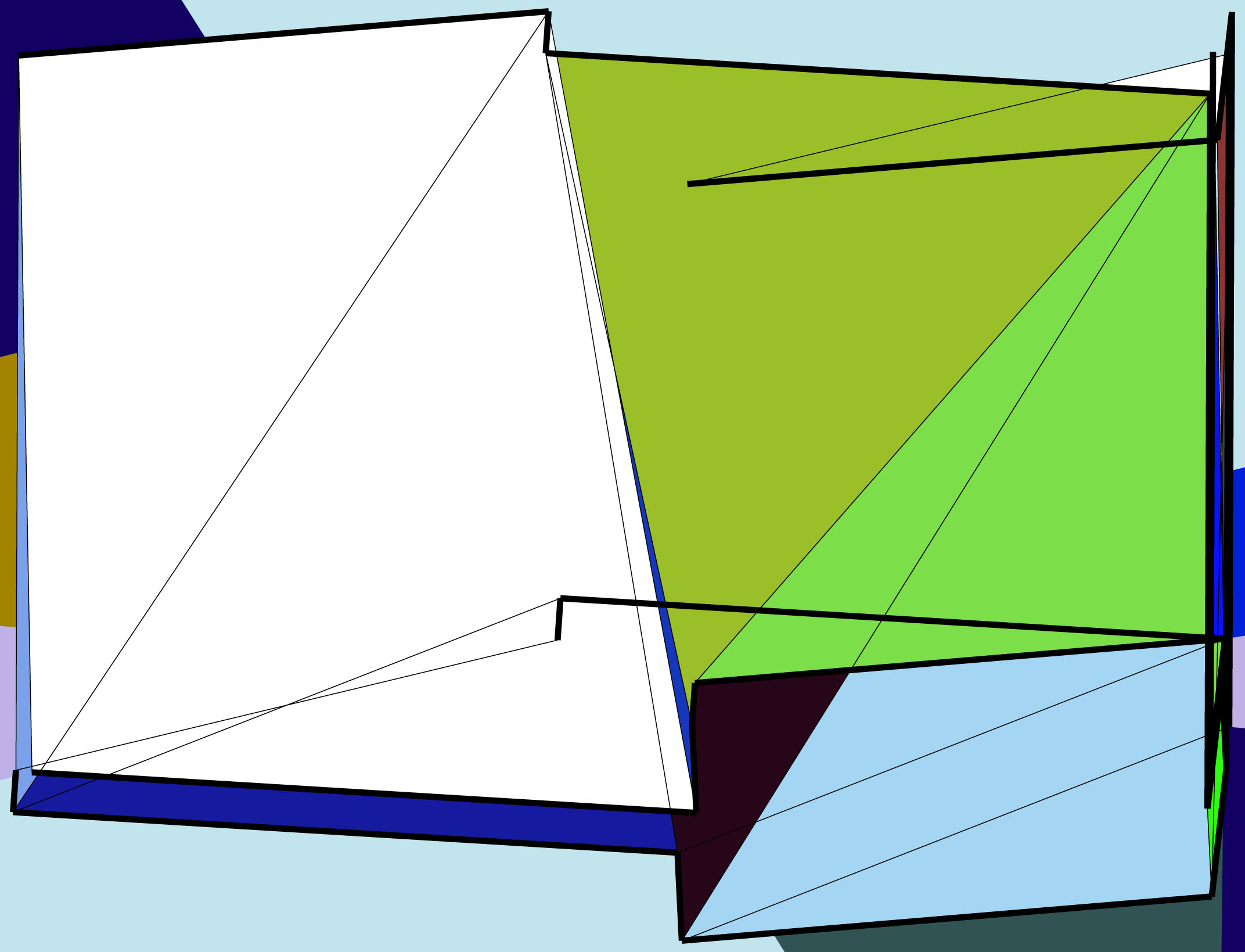
Piece "P-792_32" (2000-2007). Pigment ink on Canvas/ Wood

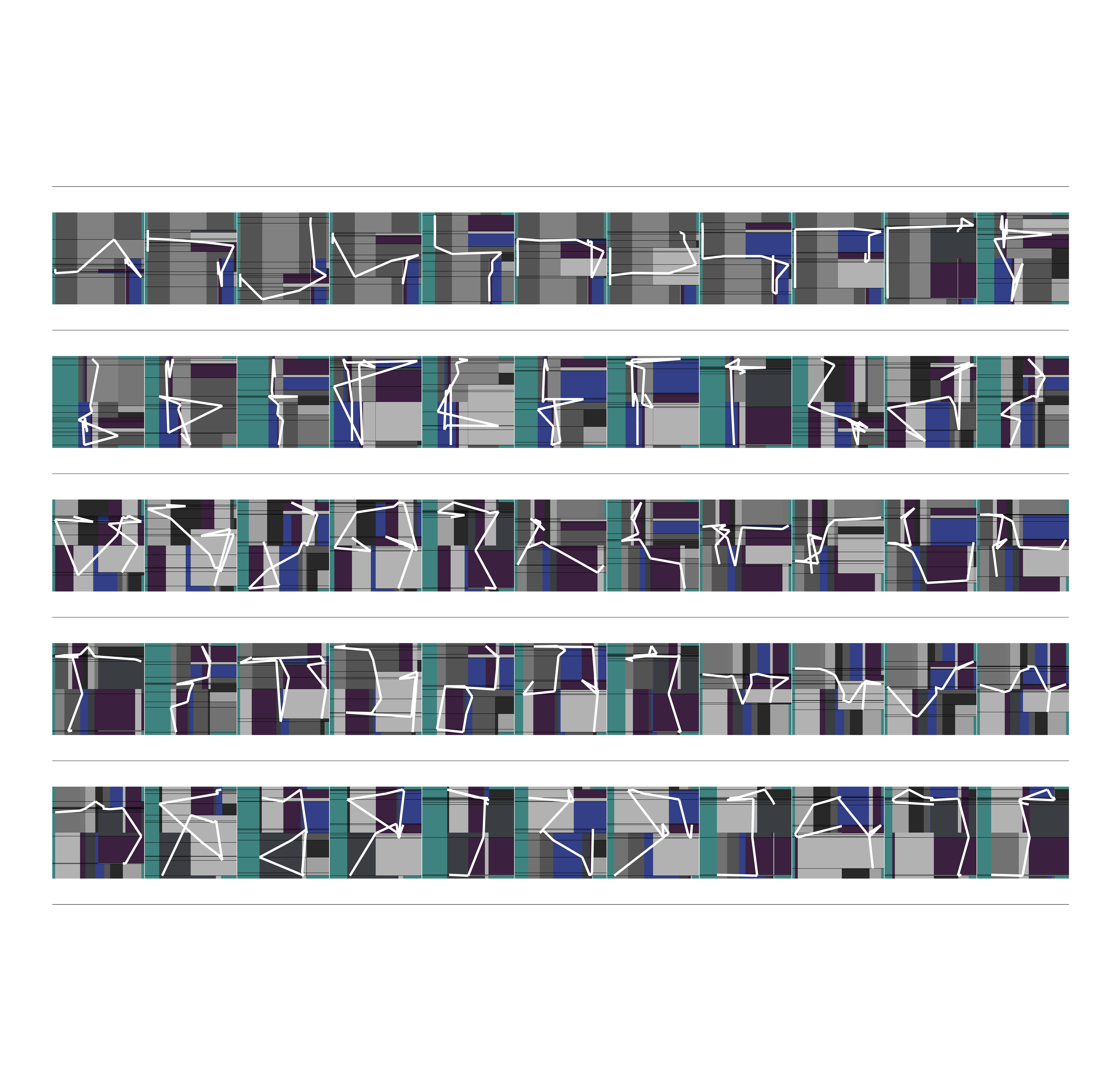
Piece "P1640_1322" (2014). Pigment ink on Canvas

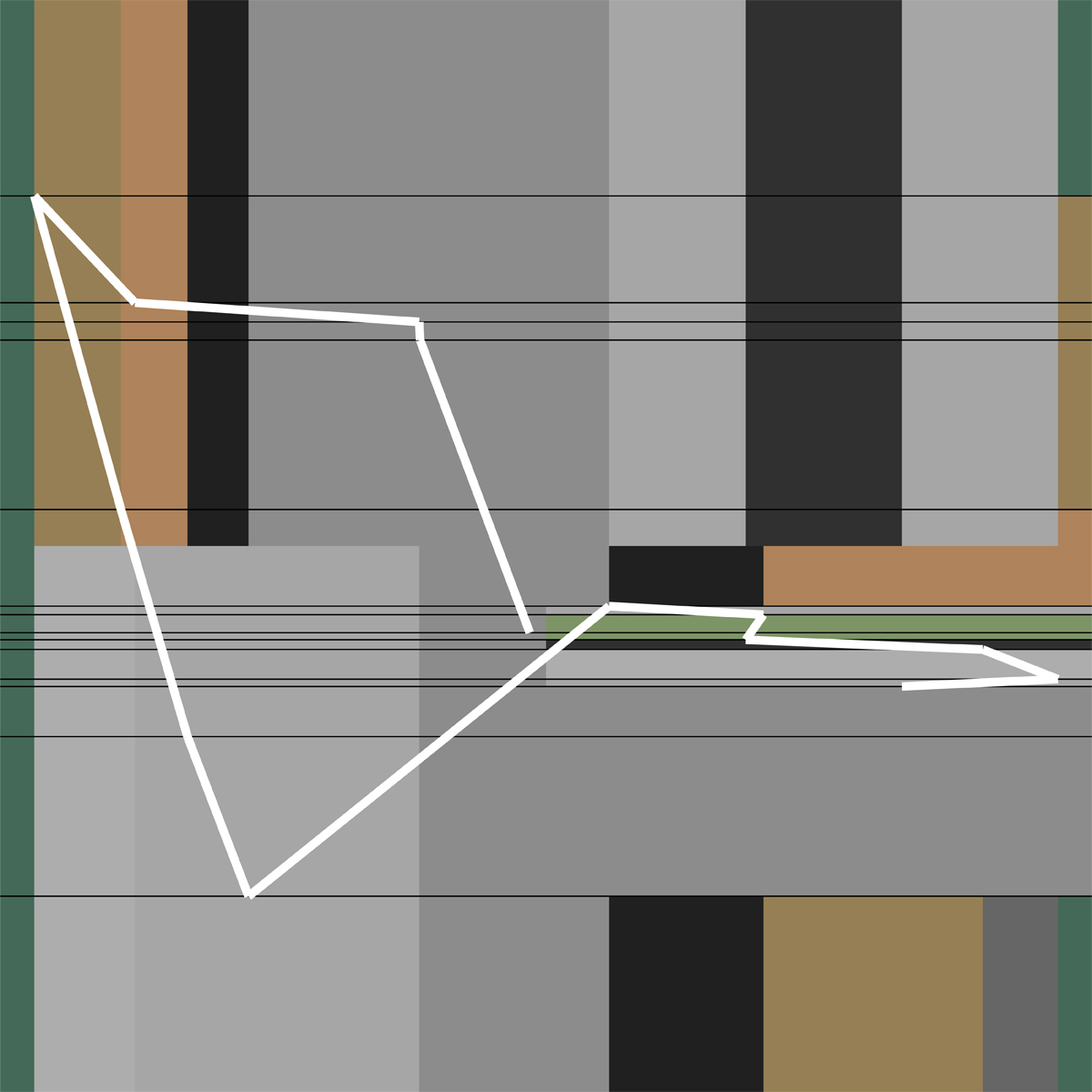
Piece "P1611_5220" (2012/13). Pigment ink on Canvas
