= Firehouse, Hook & Ladder Company 8 =

Fire station in New York City, "Ghostbusters" HQ

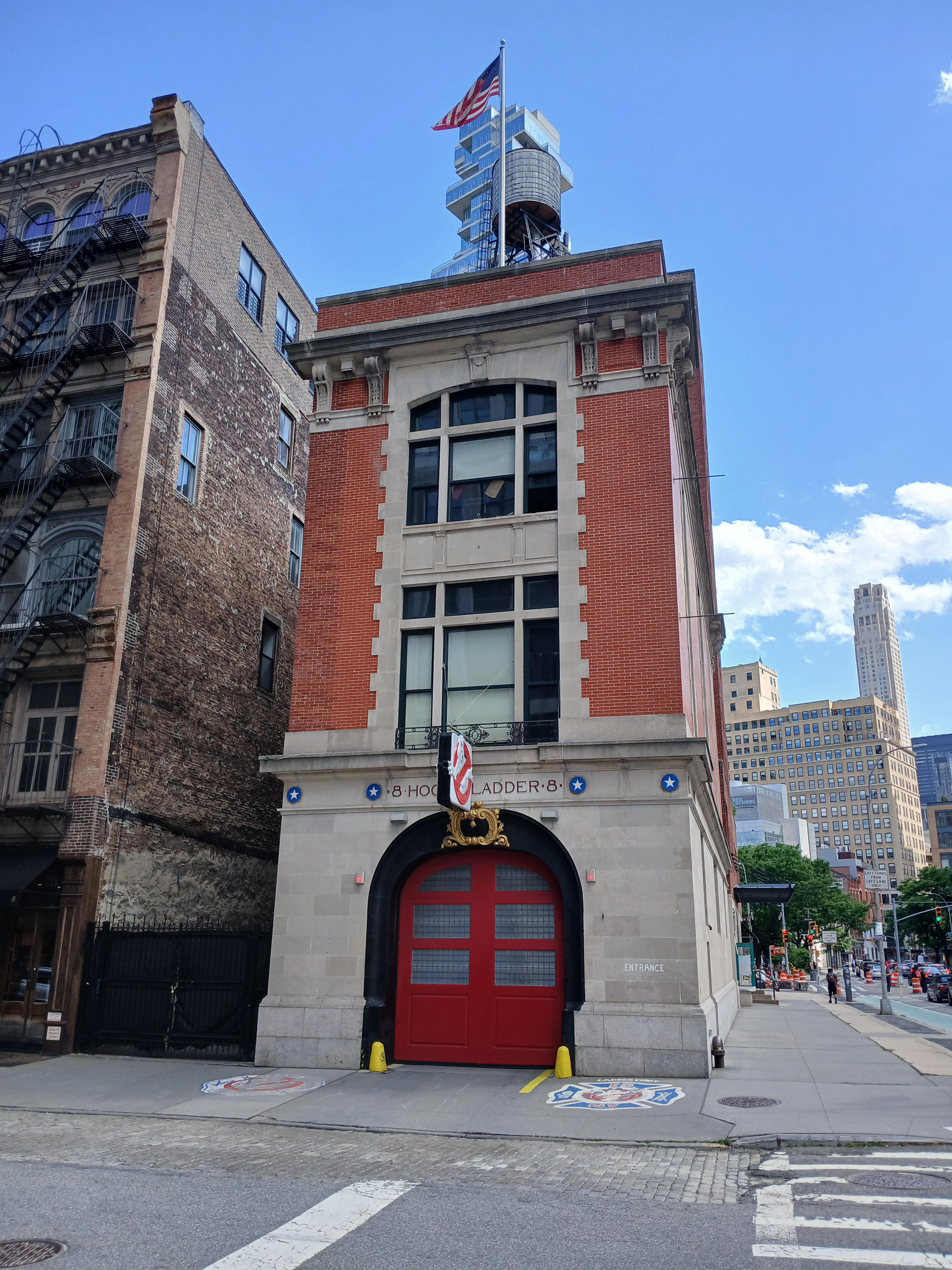
- Hook & Ladder Company 8's firehouse in May 2026
- Interactive map of the Firehouse, Hook & Ladder Company 8 area

General information
- Location: 14 North Moore Street, Tribeca, Manhattan, New York City, United States
- Coordinates: 40.7196°N 74.0066°W
- Opened: 1903

Firehouse, Hook & Ladder Company 8 is a New York City Fire Department (FDNY) fire station, located at 14 North Moore Street at its intersection with Varick Street in the Tribeca neighborhood of Manhattan, New York City. Its exterior has become famous for its appearance in the supernatural comedy franchise Ghostbusters.

== History ==
The firehouse was built in 1903 after the establishment of the FDNY as the base of the formerly independent Hook and Ladder fire company 8. The building was designed as the first of a series of Beaux-Arts style firehouses by the city superintendent of buildings, Alexander H. Stevens. The building, which originally had two vehicle doors, was halved in size in 1913 after Varick Street was widened.

The firefighters of Hook & Ladder No. 8 were among the first responders to the September 11, 2001, attacks. In 2011, the firehouse was threatened with closure after the city administration planned to close 20 fire companies to save money. But after a public campaign to save it, supported by the former Mayor Bill de Blasio and actor Steve Buscemi, who also was a New York City firefighter from 1980 to 1984, the firehouse remains in service. From 2016 to 2018, it was subject to a renovation costing $6 million.

== Filming location ==
The firehouse was selected as the base of the Ghostbusters for the 1984 film after an early draft of the script envisioned the Ghostbusters as a public service much like the fire department. Reportedly, the firehouse was chosen because the writer and actor Dan Aykroyd knew the area and liked the building. While the firehouse served as the set for exterior scenes, the interior of the Ghostbusters base was shot in a Los Angeles studio, and in Fire Station No. 23, a decommissioned Los Angeles firehouse.

In the 2016 reboot of Ghostbusters, the firehouse makes two appearances. In Ghostbusters: Afterlife it is briefly mentioned that the firehouse has become a Starbucks, but Winston Zeddemore eventually buys the location from the company and has the team's Ectomobile restored and delivered there. Their old ghost containment system is still in the basement.

The firehouse has also appeared in the 2005 film Hitch and in episodes of the television series Seinfeld and How I Met Your Mother.

In 2021, The Buffalo Ghostbusters asked fans from all around the world to raise money for a new full-size replica Ghostbusters sign, which it later donated to the firehouse. The sign now prominently hangs outside year-round, above the main entrance, and is visited often by fans. This has led to an annual fundraiser, with a celebration at the firehouse planned each year on the closest Saturday to June 8 to coincide with "Ghostbusters Day."

== Gallery ==
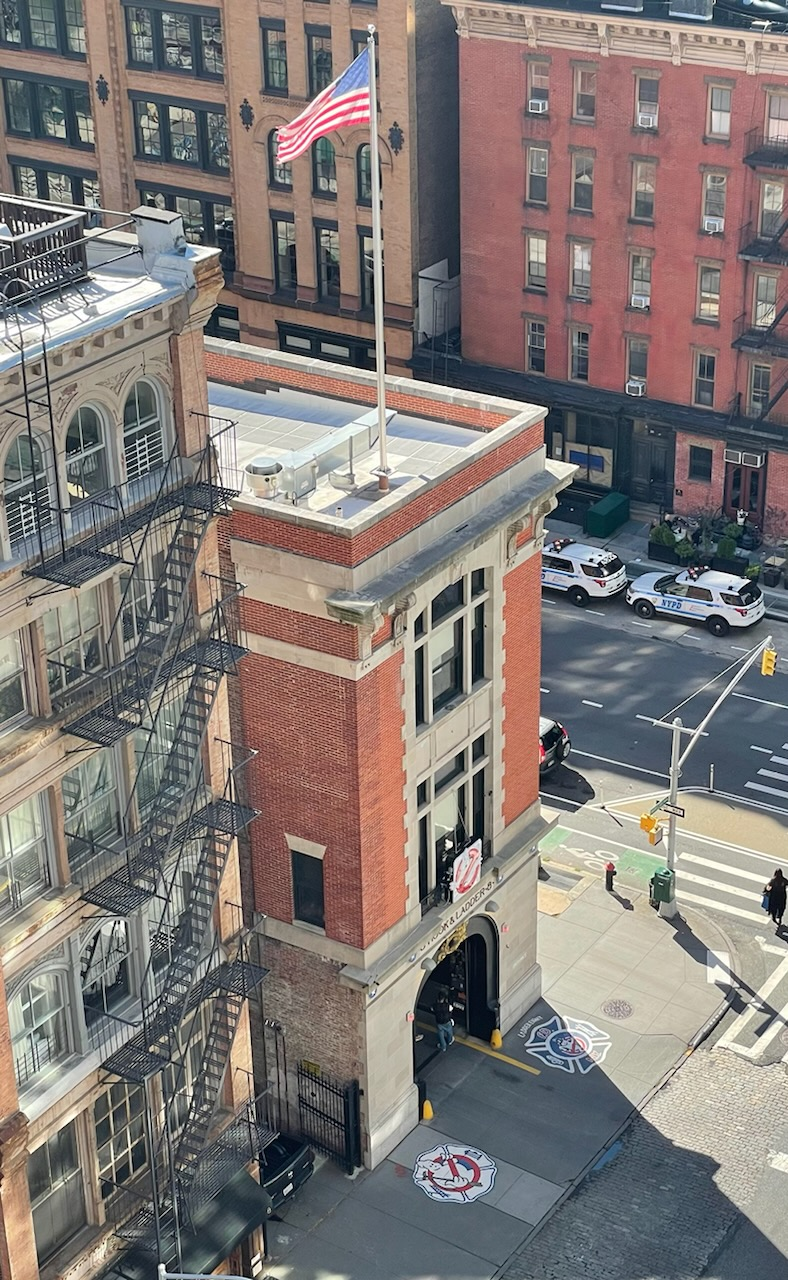
High angle photo of Firehouse, Hook & Ladder Company 8 with visible Ghostbusters logo.

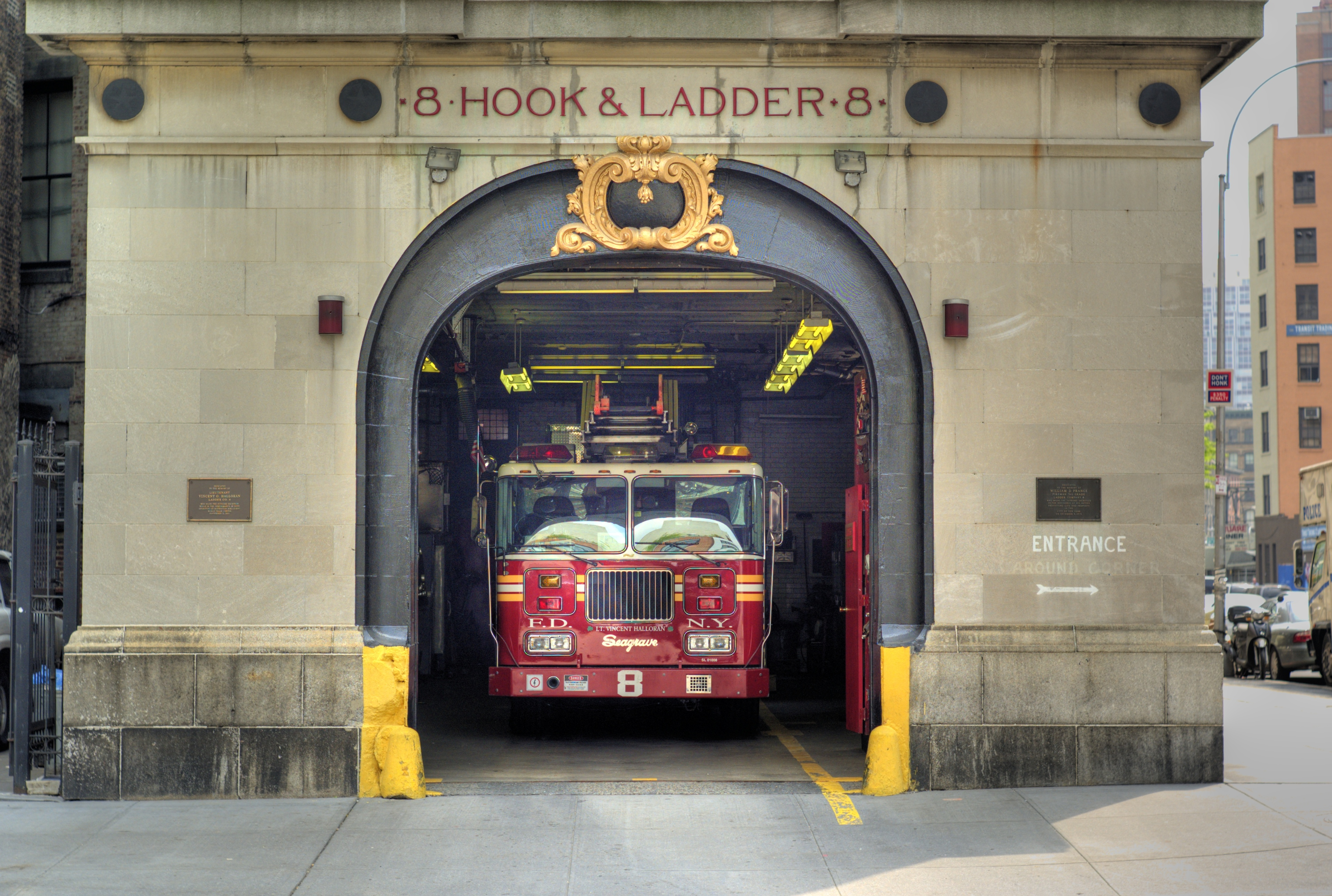
The building's main gate, with a ladder truck inside.

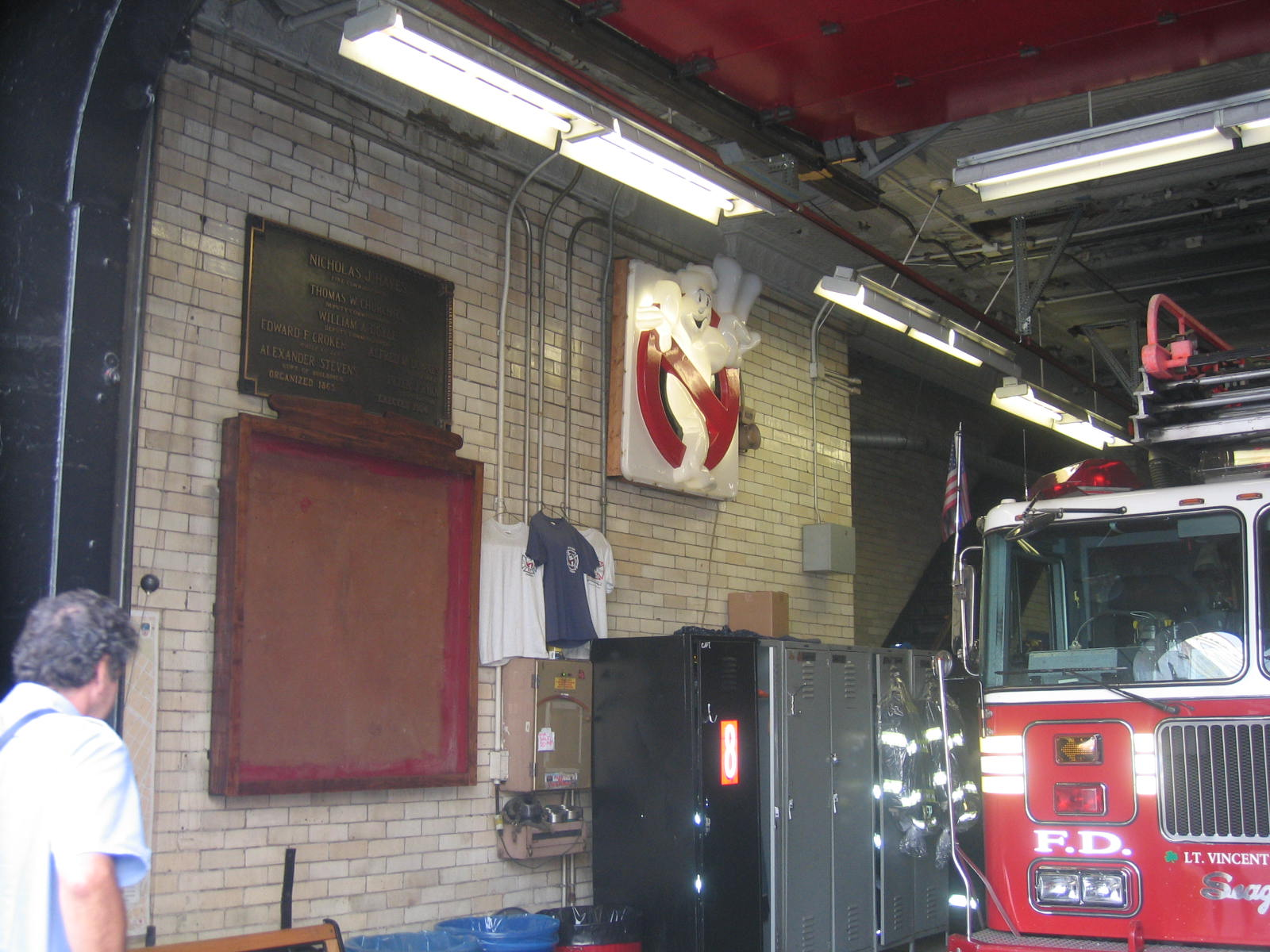
The Ghostbusters logo from the second film hanging on the wall.

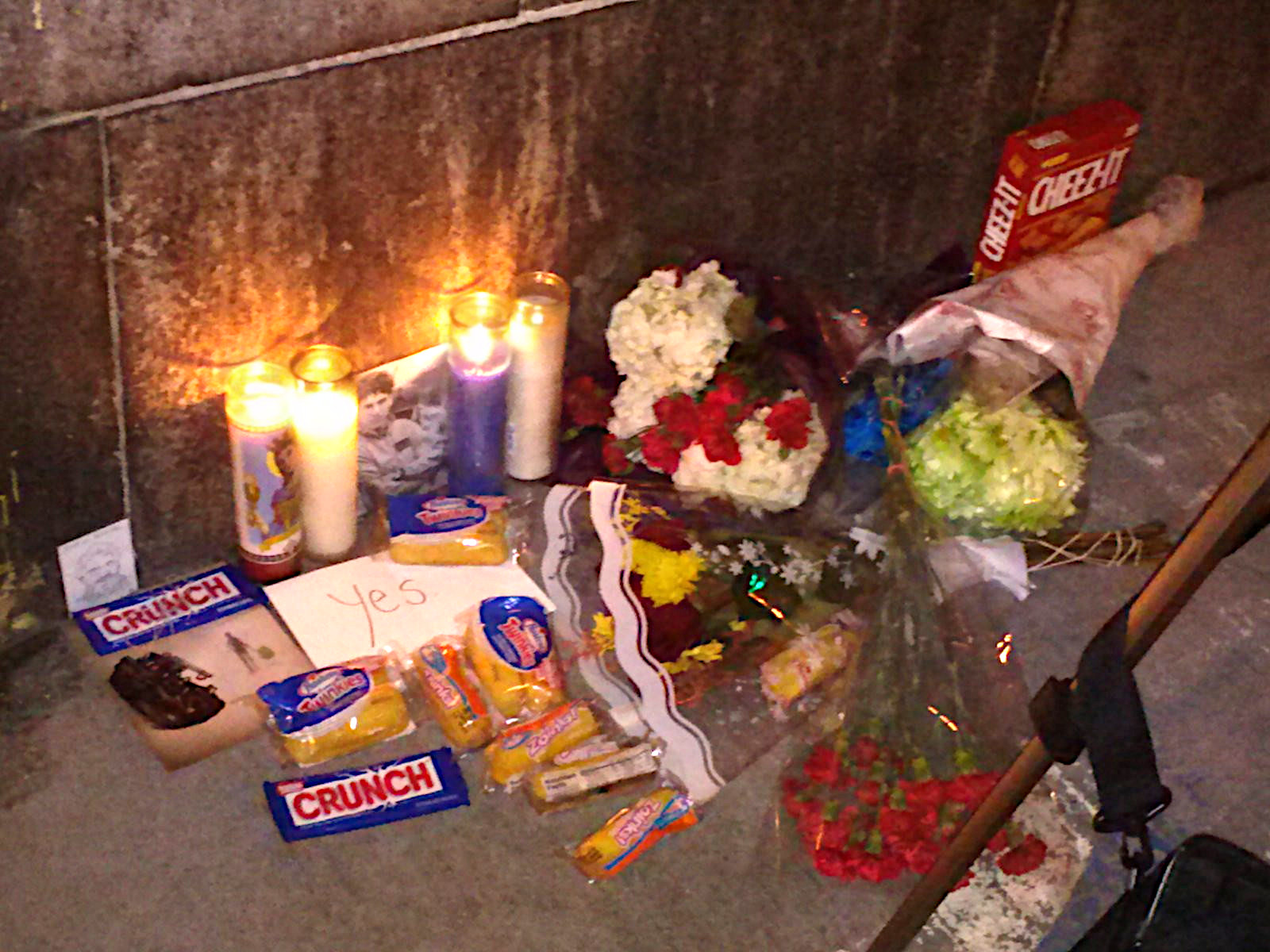
A memorial to the Ghostbusters actor Harold Ramis at the firehouse.

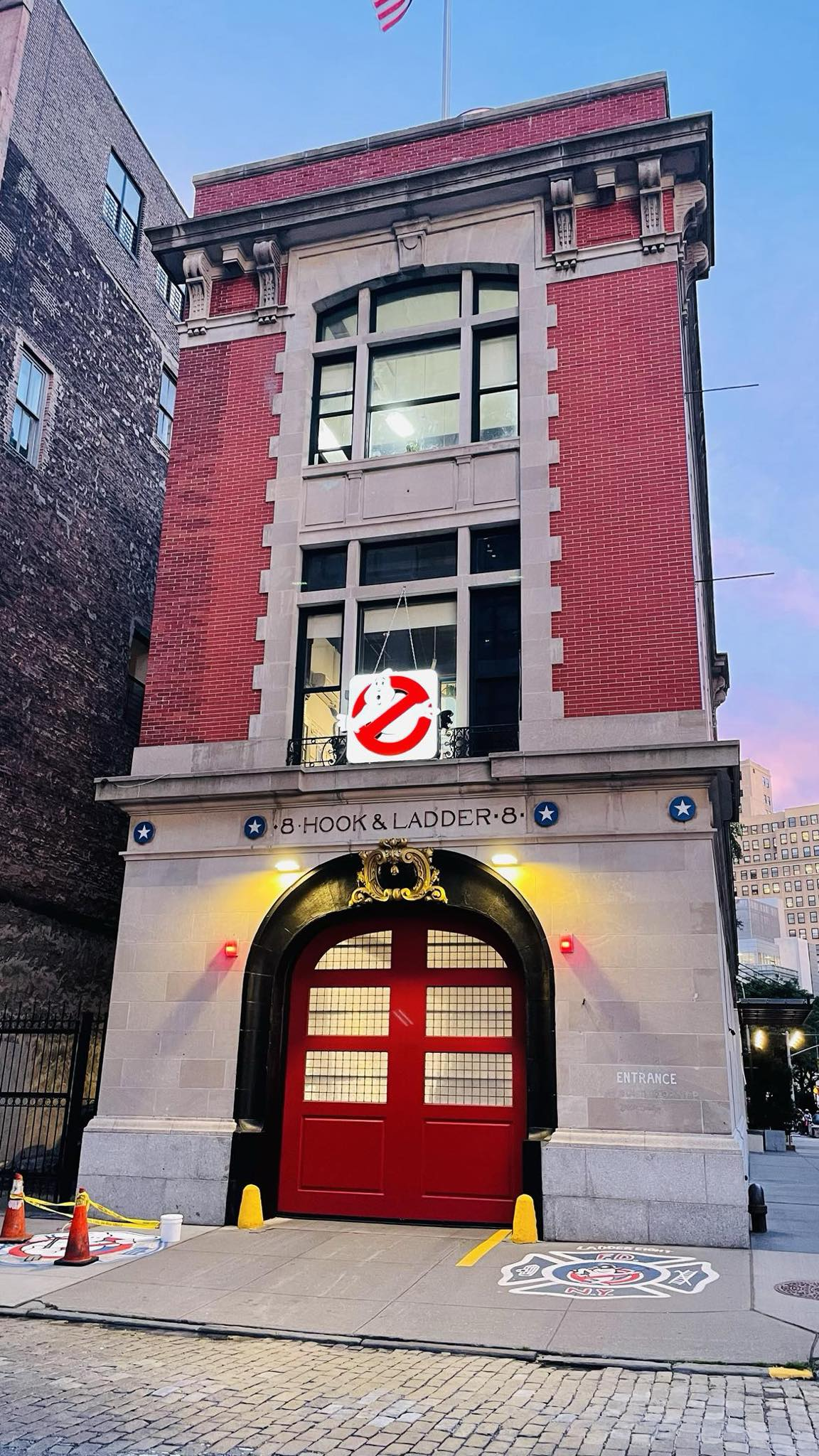
The Ghostbusters sign, donated through a fan fundraiser. Photo taken June 2022.
