= George Hall =

George Hall may refer to:

== People ==
=== The arts ===
- George Hall (actor) (1916–2002), Canadian-American actor
- George Hall (musician) (c. 1893 – c. 1989), American bandleader
- George Hall (cartoonist) (born 1960), Australian comic book writer and artist
- George Lothian Hall (1825–1888), British watercolour artist
- George Henry Hall (artist) (1825–1913), American still-life and landscape artist

=== Military and politics ===
- George Hall (Australian politician) (1811–1867), South Australian MLC and businessman
- George Hall (British administrator), private secretary in South Australia then governor of Parkhurst Prison
- George Hall (New York politician) (1770–1840), US congressman
- George Hall, 1st Viscount Hall (1881–1965), First Lord of the Admiralty of the UK
- George Barker Hall (1819–1858), lawyer, judge and political figure in Canada West
- George Benson Hall (1780–1821), naval officer and Upper Canada politician
- George J. Hall (1921–1946), American soldier and Medal of Honor recipient
- Sir George King-Hall (1850–1939), Royal Navy admiral and last commander of the Australia Squadron
- George W. Hall (c. 1840–?), American mayor of Seattle in the 1890s
- George Williamson Hall (1818–1896), Member of Parliament in Christchurch, New Zealand
- George Hall (Brooklyn) (1795–1868), American mayor of Brooklyn
- George Joseph Hall (1857–1924), member of the Queensland Legislative Assembly
- George Arthur Benjamin Hall (1868–1948), physician and political figure in British Columbia

=== Religion ===
- George Hall (bishop of Chester) (1613–1668), English Anglican bishop
- George Hall (academic) (1753–1811), Irish Church of Ireland bishop of Dromore

=== Sportspeople ===
- George Hall (American football) (born 1984), American football player
- George Hall (baseball) (1849–1923), British-American baseball player
- George Hall (Australian footballer) (1880–1954), Australian rules footballer
- George Hall (footballer, born 1912) (1912–1989), English footballer
- George Hall (footballer, born 2004) English footballer
- Willie Hall (English footballer) (George William Hall, 1912–1967), English footballer

=== Other ===
- Geo. Hall & Sons (1818–1881), manufacturer of soft drinks in South Australia
- George G. Hall (1925–2018), English mathematician and quantum chemist
- George William Hall (1770–1843), vice-chancellor of Oxford University
- George Cleveland Hall (1864–1930), American physician and humanitarian activist
- George Benson Hall Jr. (1810–1876), Quebec lumber businessman

== Places ==
- George Hall, the residence of darts pundit Bobby George
- Georgievsky Hall or St. George Hall, Grand Kremlin Palace, Moscow
