= Zooniverse (disambiguation) =

Zooniverse is a citizen science web portal through which users can contribute to science projects

Zooniverse may also refer to:

- Zooniverse, a comic book published by Fil Barlow
- Zooniverse, a fictional zoo featured in series one of the television series The Mighty Boosh
