= Igor (film) =

2008 American animated film by Tony Leondis

- Theatrical release poster
- Directed by: Tony Leondis
- Written by: Chris McKenna
- Produced by: John D. Eraklis; Max Howard
- Starring: Steve Buscemi; John Cleese; Jennifer Coolidge; John Cusack; Arsenio Hall; Sean Hayes; Eddie Izzard; Jay Leno; James Lipton; Molly Shannon; Christian Slater
- Cinematography: Dominique Monféry
- Edited by: Hervé Schneid
- Music by: Patrick Doyle
- Production company: Exodus Film Group
- Distributed by: Metro-Goldwyn-Mayer Pictures (through MGM Distribution Co., United States); TFM Distribution (France); The Weinstein Company (International)
- Release dates: September 2, 2008 (screening); September 13, 2008 (Grauman's Chinese Theatre): September 19, 2008 (United States); December 17, 2008 (France)
- Running time: 87 minutes
- Countries: United States; France
- Language: English
- Budget: $25 million
- Box office: $30.7 million

Igor is a 2008 animated film directed by Tony Leondis from a screenplay by Chris McKenna. Igor, developed and produced by Max Howard with the California-based Exodus Film Group, was the first feature-length animated film to be financed with private equity. The animation was completed at France's Sparx Animation Studios and a facility in Vietnam. It was distributed in the United States by MGM Distribution Co., by TFM Distribution in France and internationally by The Weinstein Company. It is MGM's first fully computer-animated film as well as the studio's first fully animated film in twelve years (not counting direct-to-video films) following 1996's All Dogs Go to Heaven 2.

Igor features the voices of John Cusack, Steve Buscemi, Sean Hayes, Jay Leno, Eddie Izzard, Jennifer Coolidge, Arsenio Hall, John Cleese, Molly Shannon and Christian Slater, with James Lipton in a live-action role. Conceived by McKenna as a twisting of evil scientist film tropes, Igor features Cusack as the titular Igor, who lives in the kingdom of Malaria where others of his kind serve as assistants to evil scientists. In trying to achieve his dream to become an evil scientist, Igor accidentally creates a sweet-natured female monster named Eva.

Igor's first teaser trailer premiered at the 2008 New York Comic Con before being released online on May 7, 2008. Promoted with a video game, toys, books, comic books and fast-food tie-ins, Igor premiered at the Grauman's Chinese Theatre on September 13, 2008, before starting its American nationwide theatrical run five days later. The film received mixed reviews from film critics and grossed $30.7 million worldwide on a $25 million budget. Igor received an Annie Award nomination for Valérie Hadida's character design.

== Plot ==
The land of Malaria, driven into poverty by a never-ending storm, has saved itself through evil inventions: King Malbert encouraged the best and most wicked scientists to create doomsday devices and blackmail the rest of the world. the leading mad scientists compete in the annual Evil Science Fair, assisted by hunchbacked second-class citizens known as "Igors".

One Igor aspires to become an evil scientist himself; his inventions include his friends Scamper, an immortal, yet suicidal rabbit, and Brain, an unintelligent brain (misspelled "Brian") in a jar. Igor must hide his scientific talents for fear of being sent to the "Igor Recycling Plant", especially from his master, the incompetent Dr. Glickenstein. Meanwhile, the popular Dr. Schadenfreude has won seventeen Evil Science Fairs by stealing the winning inventions from other scientists with the help of his shape-shifting girlfriend Jaclyn, and plots to use this year's invention to overthrow King Malbert and rule Malaria himself.

Unbeknownst to Igor, Glickenstein's girlfriend "Heidi" is actually Jaclyn in disguise, attempting to steal the scientist's plans. Ignoring Igor's concerns, Glickenstein is killed when his latest invention malfunctions. King Malbert, threatened by Dr. Schadenfreude's popularity, visits in hopes that Glickenstein will defeat him at the Evil Science Fair, and Igor lies that his master is creating life, which King Malbert declares would prove him the greatest evil scientist of all time. Igor decides to complete his own project for the Evil Science Fair: creating a monstrous being from various human remains.

With Brain and Scamper's help, Igor assembles a huge, indestructible monster, but the reanimated creature escapes. Sneaking into Glickenstein's castle, Dr. Schadenfreude discovers his rival is dead, and steals Igor's plans for a living monster, which he believes will be his key to taking the throne. Igor discovers the monster's "evil bone" was not activated, making her friendly and gentle, and accidentally names her Eva. His attempt to have her professionally brainwashed instead leaves her aspiring to become an actress.

Dr. Schadenfreude tries to steal Eva with a shrink ray, only to shrink himself and Jaclyn instead. Igor tells Eva that the Evil Science Fair is an audition, convincing her to act destructively. She suggests it may be better to be good than evil, and they bond as they prepare for her "performance". Dr. Schadenfreude attempts to persuade Igor to join him, revealing he knows about Glickenstein's death and the creation of Eva, and offers to make Igor the top evil scientist in Malaria if he gives him Eva to overthrow King Malbert. Igor refuses, but Dr. Schadenfreude tricks Eva into leaving with him.

Discovering the truth, a furious King Malbert sends Igor to the recycling plant to be destroyed, while Dr. Schadenfreude arrives at the Evil Science Fair with Eva. Rescued by Scamper and Brain, Igor realizes that King Malbert's "Beacon of Evil" is actually the device creating Malaria's perpetually stormy weather. King Malbert has been using the device to force his kingdom to extort 100 billion dollars from the world annually as he was dissatisfied with the meager income of the agricultural economy of Malaria. Dr. Schadenfreude manipulates Eva into striking him, activating her evil bone and turning her into a mindless killing machine. As Dr. Schadenfreude seizes the royal throne from King Malbert, Eva defeats the Evil Science Fair's other creations in the Killiseum with a violent rendition of "Tomorrow".

Igor tries to reason with the enraged Eva while Brain and Scamper destroy the weather ray, returning sunny skies to Malaria and deactivating Eva's evil bone, reverting her to her sweet and gentle self. Igor reveals King Malbert's deception to the crowd as he created the clouds to force his kingdom into extorting money from the rest of the world to enrich himself just before the king is crushed to death by his own device. Dr. Schadenfreude is humiliated and Jaclyn runs out of shape-shifting pills, revealing she is an Igor herself. Igor is named Malaria's new president, as the country finally becomes a republic, turning the annual science fair into a musical showcase. Igor and Eva are officially in love, and he shows her his plans to build them a dog, as Malaria celebrates becoming a better and brighter place.

== Voice cast ==
- John Cusack as Igor, a short hunchback who aspires to be an evil scientist
- Molly Shannon as Eva, the hideous, yet sweet monster Igor makes using human remains, who aspires to be an actress. She is mostly based on Frankenstein's Monster.
- Steve Buscemi as Scamper, an immortal, sarcastic, deadly rabbit with suicidal tendencies
- Sean Hayes as Brain, an unintelligent sentient with a human brain inside a jar. Scamper teases Brain by calling him "Brian", because he misspelled his jar. Eva later gives him a new label, with the word "Brain" spelled right.
- Suzy Eddie Izzard as Dr. Frederick "Schadenfreude" Poeklemacher, a fraudulent, flamboyant rival scientist who takes credit for other evil scientists' inventions in hopes of becoming king of Malaria
- Jennifer Coolidge as Jaclyn / Heidi, Dr. Schadenfreude's shapeshifting girlfriend who helps him steal other scientists' inventions by wooing other scientists with her shapeshifting pills. It is later revealed her true form is a female Igor. Her names are a pun on Strange Case of Dr Jekyll and Mr Hyde.
- Jay Leno as King Malbert, the tyrannical ruler of Malaria who turned their main export from crops to mad science after the storm cloud—which he is later revealed to have created—came
- John Cleese as Dr. Glickenstein, a tedious-minded and incompetent mad scientist with a prosthetic arm and Igor's former master; he is shown to have issues from his deceased mother and is said to not be very smart, as he once created an "evil lasagna" that failed to kill anyone (but tasted pretty good).
- Arsenio Hall as Carl Cristall, an invisible talk show host who does not wear pants. He is based on The Invisible Man.
- Paul Vogt as Buzz Offmann, the business owner of the Brain Wash spa. He has the body of a fly, a reference to The Fly.
- Christian Slater as Dr. Schadenfreude's Igor
- James Lipton as himself
- Jess Harnell as Announcer, Royal Guard #2

== Production ==
=== Development ===
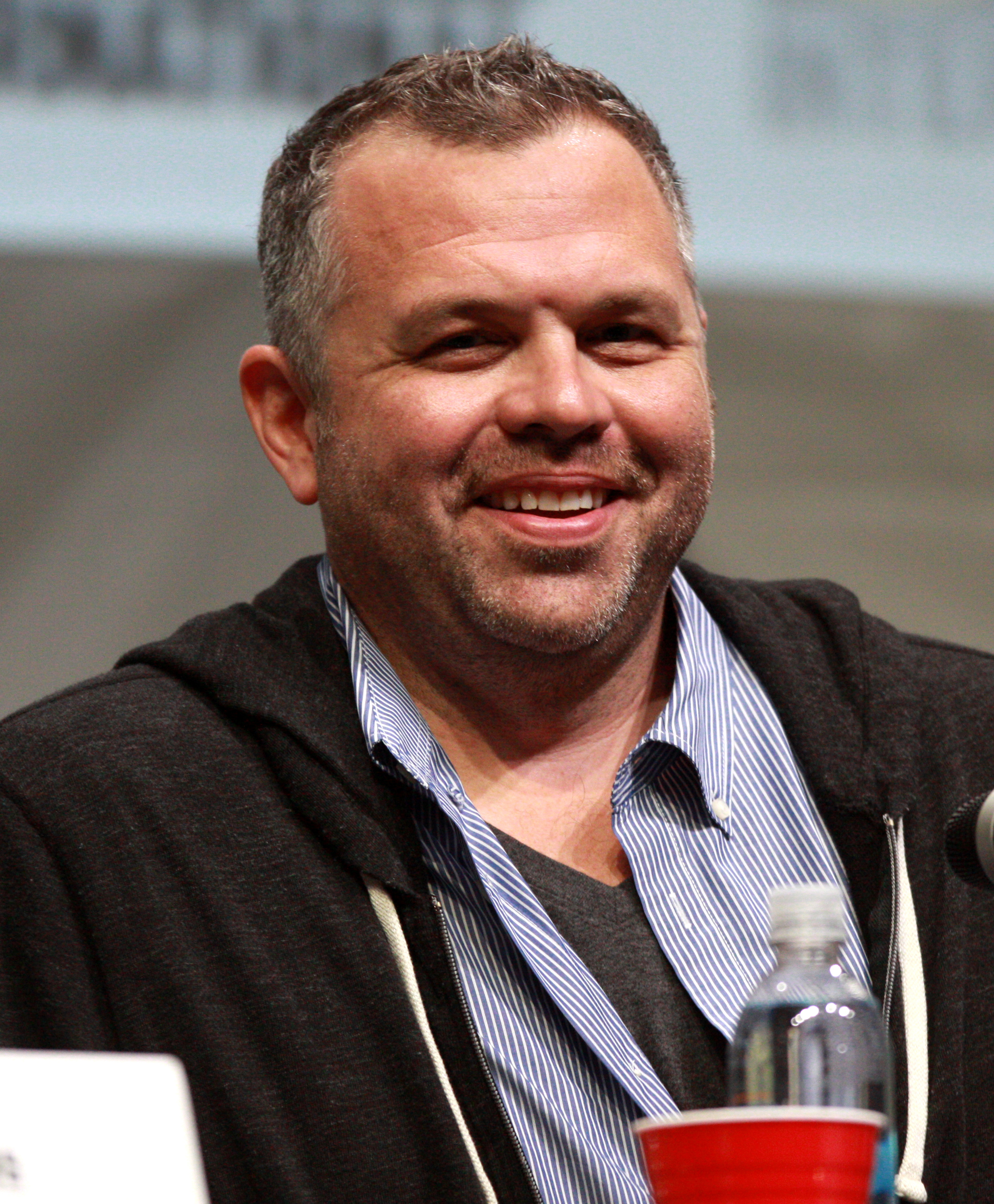
Igor writer Chris McKenna came up with the idea of a twist on scientist horror films in 1998.

While attending the 1998 Cannes Film Festival, Chris McKenna's interest in Transylvania-inspired settings caused him to conceive an evil scientist film like Frankenstein (1931) that has all of its common tropes twisted; the hunchback is smart instead of dumb, the scientist's creation is friendly instead of monstrous, the evil scientist is not intelligent, and the jar brain is stupid. In the 2000s, the increasing amount of cheap technology led smaller, independent companies to produce films in the animation industry; one of them was Exodus, where its film Igor was the first feature-length animation to be budgeted entirely with private equity. McKenna pitched his idea to the California-based Exodus Film Group as a three-paper treatment, instead of as a presentation of drawings and concept art usual for pitching animated features; the company accepted and instructed investors worldwide to finance the film. According to Exodus president John D. Eraklis, "We chose it because it was the most original concept that we had come across in years and Chris McKenna is a brilliant writer."

The Exodus project was first announced on September 7, 2004, with the involvements of McKenna, executive producer Max Howard, and 50 to 75 animators from the studio ElectroAge revealed. Exodus was developing the film as part of a $50 million fund that also included The Hero of Color City and Amarillo Armadillo; Igor made up a chunk of the fund, being budgeted at $30 million. The original plan was to produce a short film, titled Igor: Unholy Frijoles, that would get the producers comfortable with making a feature-length film and serve as a launch for a longer version of Igor to be released in 2007. The seven-minute short was also going to premiere in festivals before being distributed.

In a November 2005 interview, Howard announced that the rigging and voice recording for the short was completed and that storyboards were nearly finished for the animation to start soon; he also shared about the film's content, "This is a slightly edgier picture we're dealing with. We're taking a tongue-in-cheek look at the horror genre, in particular, Frankenstein stories but taken from Igor's point of view. There's sort of an underclass were you're born an Igor and you can only aspire to be an Igor, but, of course, he has greater aspirations than that. It's not supposed to be scary, but there's a gross-out value, which we hope kids will really enjoy. We're not making a soft, preschool property either." In early 2006, in addition to making ways into festivals, DVDs of Igor: Unholy Frijoles were being sold by Exodus to those who invested a minimum of $30,000 in the feature film's budget; in documents, Exodus enticed investors by citing a 2004 Dove Foundation study regarding the superior amount of profitability of G-rated films over R-rated motion pictures.

On September 22, 2006, it was revealed Tony Leondis would direct the feature. He got onboard due to sharing McKenna's interest in horror films and sardonic sense of humor, in addition to being into film noir and German Expressionism works; Leondis helped the writer in developing the setting's backstory, a more complicated process than McKenna predicted that required collaboration from not just the director but also the actors and producers. Leondis explained, "My goal was to take familiar monster motifs and rearrange them in a surprisingly fun way to evoke the memories that people have of classic monster movies. Something familiar enough to connect to, but at the same time fresh and unexpected so that it became a fun ride—and maybe makes them think a little along the way."

=== Casting ===
As Howard described casting A-list actors for the film, "We sent them the script. Steve Buscemi signed on very early, and he's an 'actor's actor.' Then others signed on... it just took off that way." On March 4, 2005, Slater joined the cast to play the title character in the short film, and Fil Barlow to direct. On July 19, 2005, Buscemi, Cleese and Leno entered the cast as the characters Scamper, Dr. Glickenstein and Brian the Brain. Jeremy Piven and Molly Shannon, Leondis' first decision for Eva, were cast for the roles of Dr. Schadenfreude and Eva respectively on October 19, 2006. On January 10, 2007 Jennifer Coolidge joined the cast to play Jaclyn and Heidi, and Leno switched from voicing Brain to King Malbert. On March 28, 2007, John Cusack replaced Slater in the role of Igor, and Hayes joined to voice Brain; the release date was also set for October 24, 2008. Leondis thought Cusack had a "world-weary, but hopeful" tone to his voice perfect for Igor's character arc. On May 11, 2007, Arsenio Hall was revealed to be in the cast. On July 26, 2007, Eddie Izzard replaced Piven in the role of Dr. Schadenfreude. Izzard created Schadenfreude’s accent.

=== Visuals ===
Igor was produced over the course of two years beginning in November 2007. Due to Igor's inspiration originating from a European nation and being most famous in the continent of Europe, Howard wanted to have a European studio responsible for the animation's aesthetic. He chose Sparx Animation Studios, where its French office did the designs and used $4 million worth of tech for making the film. It was Sparx's first theatrical film, as their previous work were direct-to-video products and television productions such as Rolie Polie Olie (1998–2004) and Mickey's Twice Upon a Christmas (2004). A chunk of the 65 Sparx artists and Leondis previously worked at Walt Disney Animation France, and appreciated the amount of freedom they had when working on Igor. Leondis explained, "At Disney everything had to be done in the house style, but here they really wanted to push boundaries. I came in and said, 'We're going to do something sumptuous, something sophisticated, something crazy. We're going to mix freaks, skulls and the generally creepy with the architecture of the Liberace museum.'" Igor was the last production of Sparx before it shut down its French offices a few months after the film's release.

==== Design and art style ====
Igor's first six months with Sparx involved the French facility conceiving the visual style. For the film's 120 characters, 65 locations and 250 props, Leondis wanted them to be asymmetrical, a decision coming from the film's backstory about a farm land taken over by castles with technology: "I wanted the in-organic shapes to not exactly fit, to be thrust upon our peaceful organic world."

In order to achieve both a film noir and an accessible-while-creepy aesthetic, Leondis and the art director he worked with, Olivier Besson, incorporated a fair amount of mist and smoke. Leondis also went for an art style inspired by the fashion works of Vivienne Westwood, where it takes elements from a variety of time periods; he summarized the setting's look as a mixture of the Middle Ages, the Industrial Revolution and "Pop sixties." The visual's lighting and shading took cues from the works of Rembrandt. Other influences Leondis used on the look included Brassaï's use of black-and-white and Mary Blair's color style. Leondis stated regarding the coloring, "Olivier [Besson] would use an unrealistic color like pink for the sky if the emotional moment called for it—and somehow still made it feel like our world."

In Howard's words, the animators went for a "puppet sensibility" in the characters' movements and designs, a decision inspired by the 1967 stop-motion film Mad Monster Party?. McKenna explained, "the most difficult challenge with Igor was going to be portraying him as a hunchback without making him freakish." The titular protagonist of Igor was not a prisoner per se, but character designer Valérie Hadida nonetheless gave his attire prison sensibilities to symbolize him being jailed in the land he lives in; the back of his "straitjacket" has a prison uniform pattern, and the cuffs on his hands indicate handcuffs. Hadida was later nominated for an Annie Award for Character Design in an Animated Feature Production for her work on Igor. Two patches of orange are also on Igor's back to suggest hope before Eva enters the world, who is colored a warm yellow to symbolize her adding "hope and light" to the land.

==== Animation ====
The animation of Sparx's designs were outsourced to a facility in Ho Chi Minh City that consisted of 150 animators and only worked in television advertisements. Since none of the Vietnamese animators could speak English, Leondis recorded videotapes of himself doing character movements and the voice actors doing their lines; and the Vietnamese workers would animate the characters with the tapes as references. According to Howard, "It was a real buzz to go out there and see our artwork come to life on their monitors. It's a subtle film, but they got it." Igor was computer-animated with Autodesk Maya in less than 18 months.

The set up of the tools and workflow for animating the film went on the same six months the designs were being conceived; the Paris office modelled and rigged the characters, and the Vietnamese space modelled the props and sets. A 3D animatic was done in the next four months by six animators and two camera people, with two-and-a-half of those months involving revisions of the animatic. The following six months, 50 of the Vietnamese workers animated the film before it was taken to the Paris office for the lighting and final compositing to be done with Digital Fusion. According to Sparx manager Jean-Philippe Agati, each animator completed an average of 0.6 seconds of animation. Rending was done with another Autodesk program, Mental Ray; and the company actually trained Sparx in rendering more efficiently for the first half of production . Since Sparx was in a partnership with HP Inc., hardware by the technology company was used for Igor.

=== Music ===
Leondis first met Patrick Doyle, one of his favorite film composers, about Igor in October 2007; Leondis showed Doyle the film without music as well as concept drawings, which got the composer "immediately excited." Due to having themes for different types of characters, Igor's score incorporates multiple styles, such as piano concerto for Eva's theme and a tango tinge for Dr. Schadenfreude's dance-y side. Leondis instructed Doyle to give the score a "slightly eastern feel," offering him the works of composers such as Béla Bartók to reference from. The score's Gothic elements were executed through a set of Choir samples. The soundtrack also includes five Louis Prima songs. The soundtrack was released on September 30, 2008, by Varèse Sarabande. "Pocketful of Sunshine" by Natasha Bedingfield was featured in the film's end credits, but not included on the soundtrack.

== Release ==
=== Pre-release ===
The Weinstein Company bought the North American rights to Igor on February 1, 2006, with Metro-Goldwyn-Mayer Pictures handling U.S. theatrical distribution, as part of a deal with MGM and TWC. However, differences towards the artistic vision and release idea of the film between Weinstein and Exodus led Weinstein to sell the remainder of the U.S. rights to MGM. However, The Weinstein Company remained involved in international distribution, and when selling Igor at the 2006 Marché du Film before production started, companies from almost every territory bought it; according to Howard, "We pre-sold [the film] to all the former east bloc countries pretty much on the name alone."

As of January 13, 2008, the release date was set at October 17, 2008. The Weinstein Company ran an Igor panel at the 2008 New York Comic Con, where, in addition to being an exclusive premiere of the first trailer, McKenna and Leondis presented details about the film. At the panel, Leondis also announced the contest Be an Igor, where voice actors contributed video recordings of themselves acting like an Igor for their voices to be used for extras; the top-five results were included as extras for the film's DVD.

Igor's first poster, made entirely by Leondis, was released by Weinstein on April 23, 2008; and the first trailer premiered online via AniMagTV with a high-definition video released on Yahoo! on May 8, 2008. A presentation for Igor took place at the 2008 Cannes Film Festival, where Harvey Weinstein, McKenna and Slater attended. On August 28, 2008, Exodus partnered with Malaria.com and the Against Malaria Foundation for Igor to be a spokesperson for donating to end the malaria crisis.

On September 15, 2008, Collider revealed another trailer and seven clips of Igor.

=== Merchandise ===
Exodus planned Igor to be a franchise since its inception and made several Igor merchandise deals with other companies while the film was in production. On May 11, 2007, Exodus signed a deal with Simon & Schuster to publish seven children's books based on Igor. Exodus signed another merchandise deal on June 11 with Corgi International, where they would release various products, such as figures, play sets, electronic role-play games, pocket money toys and plush toys, in September 2008. On July 26, Exodus signed a deal with IDW Publishing to produce a set of comic books, a prequel series to Simon & Schuster's Igor books. On November 16, 2007, Exodus penned a deal with CKE Restaurants Inc. to have more than 3,000 Carl's Jr. and Hardee's restaurants sell Igor toys in Cool Kids Combos. In the UK, McDonald's ran a Happy Meal promotion for the movie including 7 toys and a commercial made using stop-motion animation.

=== Video game ===
On December 7, 2007, Exodus signed with Interactive Game Group and Legacy Games to develop and publish Igor video game adaptations for the Nintendo DS, Wii, personal computer and wireless. The Wii version was developed by Santa Cruz Games and the DS version was developed by Artefacts Studio and both were published by SouthPeak Games in North America and Deep Silver in Europe.

=== Release ===
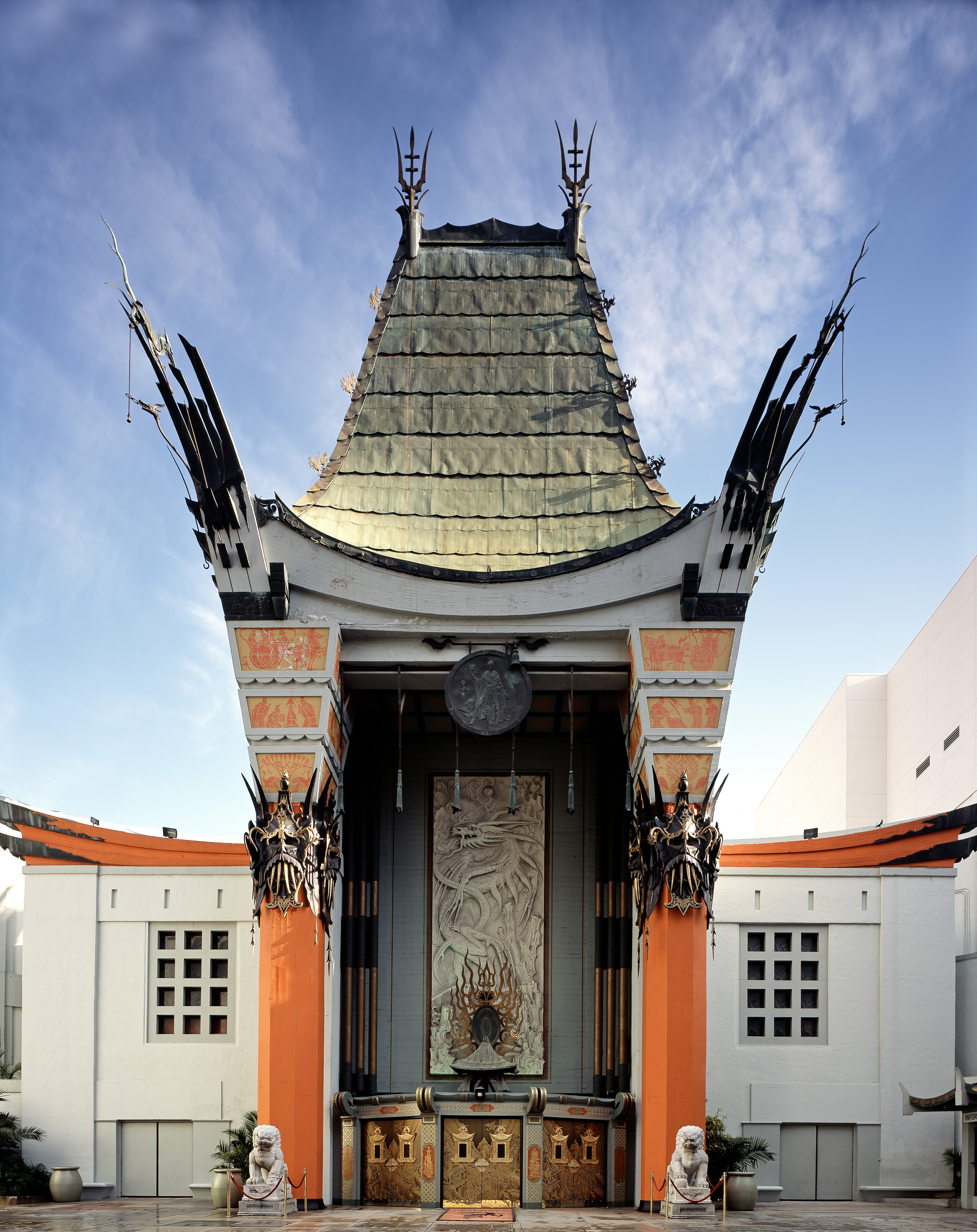
Igor premiered at the Grauman's Chinese Theatre on September 13, 2008.

Igor had its worldwide premiere on September 13, 2008, at the Grauman's Chinese Theatre, where the "red carpet" was purple instead of its usual color. Howard recalled that "almost everyone turned out for the premiere." Worldwide, Igor was released in Taiwan on October 3, 2008; the Philippines on October 8, 2008; Israel and the United Kingdom on October 10, 2008; Greece on October 23, 2008; Malaysia, Qatar and the United Arab Emirates on November 20, 2008; Iceland on November 21, 2008; Singapore on December 11, 2008; France on December 17, 2008; Kuwait and Lebanon on January 1, 2009; Australia on January 3, 2009; Oman on January 8, 2009; Bahrain on January 22, 2009; South Africa on January 23, 2009; Russia on February 19, 2009; Belgium and Egypt on April 1, 2009; the Netherlands on April 23, 2009; Mexico on April 24, 2009; Turkey on May 8, 2009; Spain on June 5, 2009; Portugal on July 23, 2009; Peru on August 13, 2009; Brazil on October 9, 2009; Argentina on December 3, 2009; Japan on January 2, 2010; Chile on February 11, 2010; Uruguay on March 26, 2010; Bolivia on September 9, 2010; South Korea on March 10, 2011; Germany on July 10, 2011; and Venezuela on September 9, 2011.

== Reception ==
=== Box office ===
Metro-Goldwyn-Mayer released Igor theatrically in the United States on September 19, 2008, to 2,300 theaters, more than "1,200 to 1,500 screens" the producers predicted.

According to Gitesh Pandya, "pre-release expectations were low since it is not based on any popular brand name property." However, he projected an opening weekend gross of $8 million due to no competition with other family films and "a marketing push highlighting how Halloween comes early this year thanks to this monster mash." He also suggested the film would drop only modestly in later weeks.

In its opening weekend the film grossed $7,803,347, ranking #4 at the box office alongside Lakeview Terrace, Burn After Reading and My Best Friend's Girl. As of February 2025, Igor has the 203rd biggest opening weekend in a September month. The film then grossed $19,528,602 domestically and $11,218,902 overseas for a worldwide total of $30,747,504. In the UK, the film opened on 32 screens with a gross of £56,177 for a screen average of £1,756 and placing it at No. 20 in the box office chart. The mainstream release opened on October 17 at 418 screens and made £981,750 with a screen average of £2,348. This placed it at No. 3 for that weekend. The UK total gross is £1,110,859.

Noel Murray opined that Igor had a difficult time selling tickets due to being "too macabre for young children and too cutesy for hip adult moviegoers," and Adam Quigley reported it was "instantly forgotten following its release."

=== Critical predictions ===
Alex Billington, also covering the trailer, predicted Igor might be good thanks to its cast, but may do mediocrely at the box office, citing the performance of Arthur and the Invisibles, a previous English-language animated film released in 2006 and made in France. I Watch Stuff was turned off by the "archetypical Disney-esque jokes and characters" presented in the trailer, also mocking Igor's design as "a hunchbacked David Gest." Peter Sciretta also had little faith in the film's quality due to Weinstein's poor reputation with animated films, but Kryten Syxx wrote that "there's enough [in the trailer] to please horror fans" as well as children, Ryan Parsons suggested that Igor "looks charming enough" to compete with bigger productions from Pixar and DreamWorks, and Cartoon Brew thought it looked "intriguing" judging by the trailer.

=== Contemporaneous reviews ===
According to Rotten Tomatoes, the film holds an approval rating of 40% based on 93 reviews, with an average rating of 4.9/10; the critical consensus reads, "With an animation style that apes Tim Burton, and a slew of cultural references that aren't clear enough to reach the crowds, Igor's patched together antics make it hard to see who the film is trying to please." The film holds a "mixed or average" aggregate score of 40/100 on Metacritic based on 19 reviews as of the same time. While The Age called Igor "a fun time-killer for kids aged tween and up", The Austin Chronicle panned it for being uninspired in all aspects, such as animation, story and voice acting.

Many criticisms were pointed towards the story, mainly that it was very unclear in messages, form and age appeal. According to The New York Times, "Kiddies [...] will be undiverted by the humdrum animation and a palette that mirrors the film's moral and meteorological gloom. Neither will they respond to a script (by Chris McKenna) that seems more focused on tickling movie-savvy adults [...] 'Igor' leaves us unmoved by its vertically challenged hero." Exclaim! summarized, " the journey is sloppy and uneven, with technical fouls aplenty. [...] It is difficult to determine what audience might have an appreciation for this, as the material will prove too dark for many youngsters and too insipid for elders." Slant Magazine writer Nick Schager concluded that it "feels chintzy and imitative, with kids unlikely to be seriously captivated by its bland hero and viewers over the age of five ultimately apt to relate only to Scamper (Steve Buscemi), an immortal rabbit desperate to commit suicide." Dark Horizons writer Garth Franklin wrote that its content was too little in amount for a full-length film. Some reviewers were turned off by its pacing; Franklin noted that its "characters run around in a manic rush and yet there's little 'action' to speak of," while Robert Abele of Los Angeles Times wrote the pacing issues came in its editing, camera movements, and line deliveries.

Michael Phillips called Igor unfunny, "uneven and overstuffed," although highlighted the presence of Scamper. The San Francisco Chronicle writer Peter Hartlaub opined "the filmmakers waste some clever and subversive writing by cramming everything into a Disneyfied plot filled with misunderstandings and morality speeches." Similarly, The Globe and Mail thought its interesting monster movie concept was "thwarted by traditional prejudices." Wrote Kurt Loder, "the picture suffers from a humor deficit. The fact that the jar in which Brain resides is mislabeled "Brian" is not hilarious; nor is a strained butt-scratching gag involving an invisible talk-show host." The story is "innocuous and predictable—a modest do-gooder trying to pretend that its not Cartoonland's most direct attack of the Bush administration," wrote Amy Nicholson. In the opinion of an IGN critic, "Writer Chris McKenna [...] has essentially crafted a tale that robs the genre of all of its hallmarks—real monsters, gore, or even just genuinely scary moments—in lieu of a superficially entertaining tome that either borrows heavily from the above predecessors or doesn't have enough creativity not to steal from their iconic landscapes."

Mark Demetrius of Filmink opined that the film was ruined by cliches, an overwhelming amount of adult jokes, forced humor, and a "pathetic" ending. Franklin also panned its "dated" and "forced" pop-culture humor, and Janice Page wrote it "riffs on classic monster-movie cliches mostly by spinning them into newly unfunny cliches." A review from the Toronto Star claimed cliches, "movie quotes and Hollywood parodies dictate the action," also stating the kids wouldn't get the references. Schager explained, "Director Anthony Leondis peppers his tale with a host of leaden cinematic references children will almost surely miss, which is just as well since virtually every film-related gag directed at adults feels like a pitiful attempt at knowing cleverness." According to The Hollywood Reporter, the plot was "undernourished, and the wit erupts only in flashes." The Orlando Sentinel dismissed it as "chatty and dull" and "a bit too reliant on innuendo." As Entertainment Weekly summarized in their review, "the visuals are a kick; the groan-inducing dialogue isn't," and the hero is "charmless." Even a positive TV Guide review thought it didn't work as a children's film due to its adult references and horror film elements.

Pete Hammond of Boxoffice called Igor "first rate" for a low-budget film, while the movie's look was considered by Demetrius to be its best aspect. Some sources thought the film was "all its own" and "fresh" in spite of its influences of Tim Burton films and old-school horror movies, The Orlando Sentinel labeling the animation a "credible" rip-off of The Nightmare Before Christmas (1993). The A.V. Club stated the visuals succeeded in "detail and fluidity" if not for taking "advantage of three-dimensional space." One critic highlighted the film's use of shadow, "not only to strike the pre-requisite mad scientist mood but to enhance the feeling of 3 dimensions. This, coupled with a cinematic eye leaning towards the dramatic, further pulls you into the feature, exposing the creator's love for black and white horror films of years past." The visuals did have its detractors, however. Schager wrote the animation is "at times is vibrant and elaborately eerie, and at others is so stiff, inexpressive and flat." IGN thought the animation looked like "a bargain-basement ripoff of better films." Franklin called it too "inconsistent," Hartlaub who opined "the character design leans more toward disturbing than cute," and Total Film who was turned off by the "shoddiness" of the art style. The voice cast was heavily praised, being called "stellar," "top-notch," and a "quirky highlight" in reviews. According to one journalist, "this is one cast that consistently had me laughing across the board."

Some reviewers found the underlying concepts to be clever, such as a Wired review that opined the film had a "clever premise," "outrageous characters, some artsy scenery, and some cool laboratories. The Sydney Morning Herald praised it for being unique from most family films due to its cast of improv actors and impertinent horror concept: "Igor celebrates a defiantly adolescent and suitably caricatured vision of mortality with the potential to have adults and special young malcontents in stitches." A Total Film reviewer called it "a compellingly oddball tale that should eventually find its niche as a minor late-night cult classic for Nightmare Before Christmas fans," although called its themes of "suicide and spousal abuse" odd for a family film. Some critics called it one of the rare family flicks to appeal to adults as well as kids. In the words of a Newsday character, "the overall tenor of "Igor" is goofily funny—probably a bit sophisticated for kids but certainly good-natured," and "the animated characters possess an unusual depth of emotion." The A.V. Club labeled it an "appealing mix of macabre, reference-heavy horror-movie trappings and good-natured positivism," favorably comparing it to Burton's works for being "appealingly manic and cute as well as sick." A five-out-of-five review from Dread Central claimed, "The comedic timing is top notch with humor that is 95% mean spirited, often remarkably dark and at times even a little gory." Even a reviewer who found the film's concept conformist, Peter Bradshaw, wrote that it was made up for by its dark tone.

The inclusion of Louis Prima songs also garnered divided reactions; while appreciated by some reviewers to the point where one called it "the film's best decision," others found it unfitting with Doyle's score. The soundtrack was ecstatically received by Hartlaub for its mixture of song styles.

== Home media ==
Igor was released to DVD, Blu-ray and Amazon Prime in the United States and Canada on January 20, 2009, by 20th Century Fox Home Entertainment and MGM Home Entertainment; Wal-mart exclusively sold DVDs with memorabilia, toys and a book of the film, and Best Buy sold them five dollars off. The DVD includes deleted scenes, bloopers and a featurette named Be An Igor; and Blu-ray includes those plus an alternate opening and commentary by Leondis, McKenna and Howard. The film ranked fourth in its opening weekend at the DVD sales chart, making $3,509,704 off 175,000 DVD units. As per the latest figures, 596,146 DVD units have been sold, translating to $11,739,919 in revenue. Internationally, the film was issued on Blu-ray in Germany on December 3, 2009 and Mexico in 2014. MGM later included Igor in two of its collections: a Blu-ray Best of Family collection released on February 4, 2014, and an MGM 90th Anniversary DVD set distributed on June 3, 2014.
