= Max Howard =

Film producer

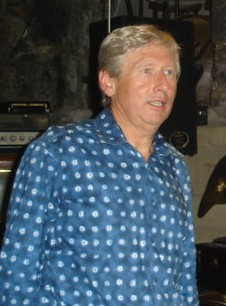
- Howard in 2010
- Born: United Kingdom
- Occupation: Film producer

Max Howard is a film producer and studio executive, based in Los Angeles. He has run studios for Walt Disney Feature Animation in London, Paris, Orlando and Los Angeles, and was president of Warner Bros. Feature Animation. His credits include Who Framed Roger Rabbit, Spirit: Stallion of the Cimarron, and Igor.

Howard lives in Los Angeles, and runs two independent film companies, Melwood Pictures, and the Max Howard Consulting Group. Howard has been honoured with a Doctorate of Arts degree from Teesside University in the United Kingdom in recognition for his services to the animation industry. He is also the Chancellor of Middlesbrough Children's University.

In 2015, Howard started working In China on a regular basis for the DeTao Group, where he runs Melwood Pictures at DeTao, and is developing features based on Chinese content.

== Filmography ==
- 1988 - Who Framed Roger Rabbit - Animation Administrator
- 1989 - The Little Mermaid - Studio Executive
- 1990 - The Rescuers Down Under - Studio Executive
- 1991 - Beauty and the Beast - Studio Executive
- 1992 - Aladdin - Studio Executive
- 1994 - The Lion King - Studio Executive
- 1995 - Pocahontas - Studio Executive
- 1996 - Space Jam - Studio Executive
- 1998 - Quest For Camelot - Studio Executive
- 1999 - The Iron Giant - Studio Executive
- 2002 - Spirit: Stallion of the Cimarron - Executive producer
- 2008 - Igor - Producer
- 2013 - Saving Santa - Executive producer
- 2014 - The Hero of Color City - Producer
- 2017 - Bunyan and Babe - Producer

== Awards ==
In 1998, he received a Certificate of Merit at the Annie Awards in Los Angeles.
