= South Barracks, Gibraltar =

Building in Gibraltar

South Barracks
- Part of Fortifications of Gibraltar
- Gibraltar
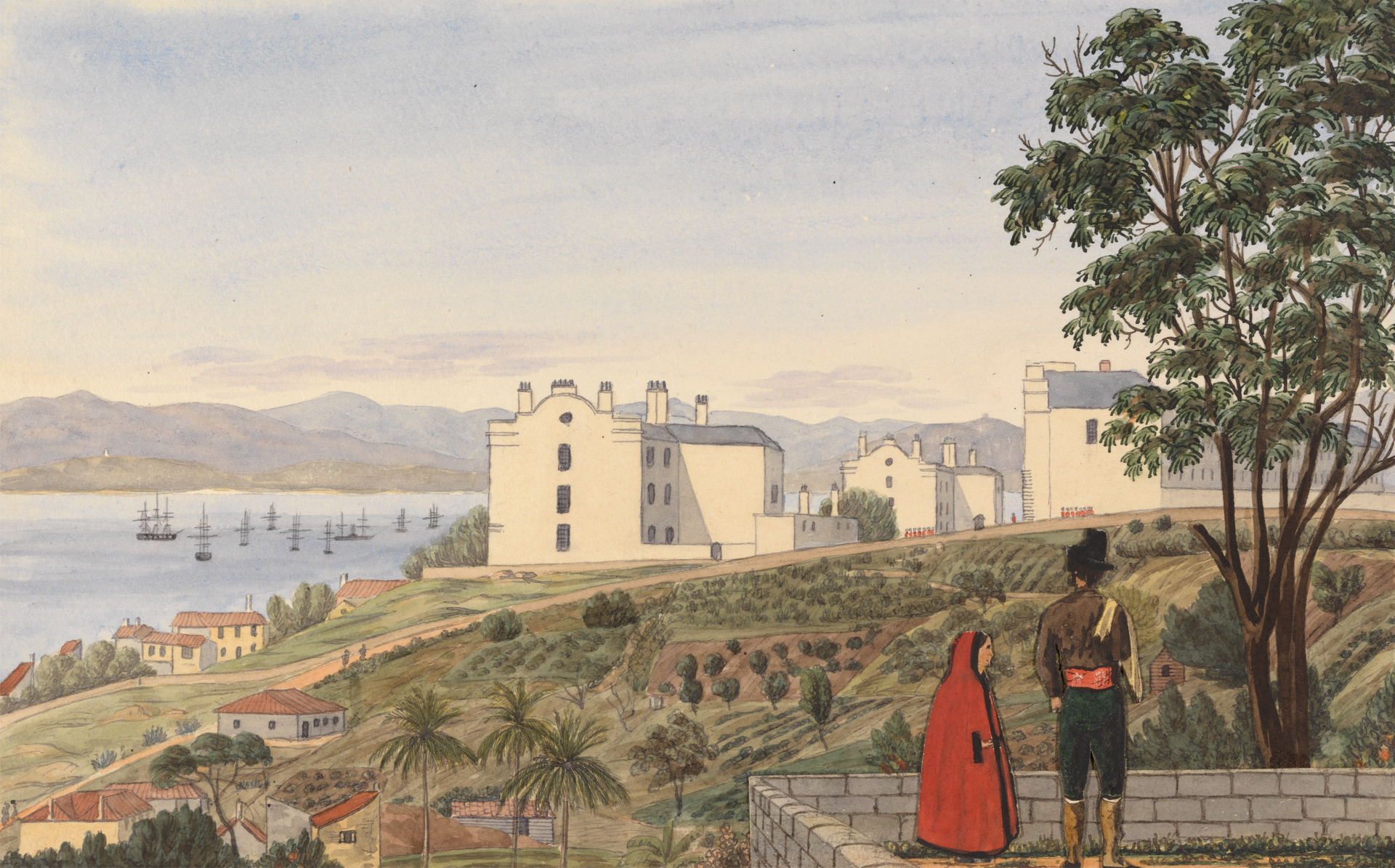
- South Barracks, Gibraltar in 1844 by George Lothian Hall

Site information
- Type: Barracks
- Owner: Government of Gibraltar

Location
- Location in Gibraltar
- Coordinates: 36.125171°N 5.35057°W

Site history
- Built: 1730s

South Barracks were barracks built for the garrison in what is now the British Overseas Territory of Gibraltar. The barracks were built in the 1730s and were on the west side of Gibraltar overlooking the docks and the harbour. The barracks now house St. Joseph's First and Middle School.
