= Extreme Ghostbusters =

1997 American animated television series

- Genre: Horror comedy; Supernatural
- Based on: Ghostbusters by: Dan Aykroyd; Harold Ramis
- Developed by: Jeff Kline; Richard Raynis
- Voices of: Tara Charendoff; Maurice LaMarche; Jason Marsden; Pat Musick; Alfonso Ribeiro; Rino Romano; Billy West
- Opening theme: "Ghostbusters", performed by Jim Cummings
- Composer: Jim Latham
- Country of origin: United States
- Original language: English
- No. of seasons: 1
- No. of episodes: 40

Production
- Executive producers: Joe Medjuck; Danny Goldberg; Richard Raynis
- Producers: Audu Paden; Duane Capizzi
- Running time: 22 minutes
- Production companies: Adelaide Productions; Columbia TriStar Television

Original release
- Network: Syndication (Bohbot Kids Network)
- Release: September 1 – December 8, 1997

Related
- The Real Ghostbusters (1986–1991)

Extreme Ghostbusters is an American animated television series, based on the Ghostbusters franchise, which initially aired from September 1 to December 8, 1997. A sequel to The Real Ghostbusters, which aired from 1986 to 1991 on ABC, Extreme Ghostbusters is set after that series' finale. The 40-episode series initially aired on the syndicated Bohbot Kids Network's "Extreme Block" in 1997, and featured a team of college-aged Ghostbusters led by veteran Ghostbuster Egon Spengler. In some TV listings, the series was called Ghostbusters Dark.

== Plot ==
Many years after the end of The Real Ghostbusters, a lack of supernatural activity has put the Ghostbusters out of business. The members have gone their separate ways except for Egon Spengler, who still lives in the firehouse, monitors the containment unit, takes care of Slimer, furthers his education, and teaches a class on the paranormal at a local college. When ghosts begin to reappear, Egon is forced to recruit four students as the new Ghostbusters: Kylie Griffin, a goth genius and expert on occultism; Eduardo Rivera, a cynical Latino slacker; Garrett Miller, a young wheelchair athlete; and Roland Jackson, a studious African-American machinery whiz. The cast also includes Janine Melnitz (the Ghostbusters' secretary, who returns to the job) and Slimer, a hungry ghost.

The series follows the next generation of Ghostbusters, who track down and capture ghosts throughout New York and (occasionally) beyond the city. A supernatural comedy, following the trend set by its predecessor, has an updated, darker feel exemplified by a gritty, punk-inspired variation of Ray Parker Jr.'s song "Ghostbusters" as its opening theme. The song, written by Jim Latham, is performed by voice actor Jim Cummings. Throughout the series, the new team learns to work together despite their differences: Janine's largely-unrequited affection for Egon, the unresolved love-hate relationship between Kylie and Eduardo, and the Ghostbusters' frequent clashes with authority figures who are skeptical about their work.

== Characters ==
(left to right) Garrett Miller, Slimer, Kylie Griffin, Eduardo Rivera, Roland Jackson, and Egon Spengler.

- Slimer (voiced by Billy West) – Slimer, the least-changed of all the characters in terms of personality, has a less-cartoonish look. Well-meaning, he is often pushed around by the Ghostbusters because his constant eating gets in their way. Slimer tries to fix his mistakes, often with unintended consequences. He is heroic, wielding a proton pack in "Bird of Prey". Slimer is a rival of Eduardo, who (with the other Ghostbusters) cares for him despite his annoying traits. He has lived with Egon for over a decade, and they are closer than in the original series.
- Eduardo Rivera (voiced by Rino Romano) – Lazy, sarcastic and apparently clueless, Eduardo is also determined and reliable; he and Garrett resemble original Ghostbuster Peter Venkman. Eduardo has a love-hate relationship with Kylie, whom he loves. He has an older brother, Carlos "Carl" Rivera, an NYPD officer who resents Eduardo's not being a police officer like the rest of their family and thinks the Ghostbusters are a scam (the reason Eduardo kept his job a secret). Eduardo has a friendly rivalry with Garrett, and his apparent laziness is due to his fear of failure. In an interview and the book "Ghostbusters: The Ultimate Visual History," Rino Romano said: "Spiritually, and I know this sounds kind of stupid, but I thought I was born to play that role. Eduardo was basically the lovable character. He's in love with the girl but he's too much of a wuss to admit it. He's both the comic relief, the antihero, and the romantic foil. Extreme Ghostbusters was the best-written show, because it wasn't just about the ghostbusting, it was about the characters".
- Kylie Griffin (voiced by Tara Strong, credited as Tara Charendoff) – Kylie is the only member of the new team with prior paranormal knowledge; her friend, Jack, was a victim of the Grundel. In awe of Egon when the series begins, they shift to a more equal footing. Kylie's calm exterior often makes her a foil for Eduardo's brashness. Her parents are divorced, and she lives alone with her cat. She was close to her grandmother Rose, who died a year before the series begins; her interest in the paranormal and her goth appearance may be related to her grandmother's death. Kylie also appears in the IDW Publishing Ghostbusters comic books, where she works at Ray Stantz's occult book shop before becoming a Ghostbuster in 2013.
- Roland Jackson (voiced by Alfonso Ribeiro) – Roland is the most level-headed and mechanically gifted of the new Ghostbusters, helping Egon repair and improve the proton packs and Ecto-1; he joined Egon's class after seeing the Ecto-1 at an auto show. Wanting to become an Ivy League doctor, he is slow to anger. Roland, the oldest child of a lower-middle-class family, has a mischievous younger brother he refuses to believe is a troublemaker.
- Garrett Miller (voiced by Jason Marsden) – Garret has a jock-like attitude and is a fan of extreme sports and mad stunts. Born a paraplegic, he mocks his condition and feigns helplessness to convince two FBI agents to un-cuff him. Garret is studying to be a physical therapist, but secretly dreams of being an NBA star. Bob Higgins said that in a focus group of young children, the creators found that Garrett was the most popular character: "When we asked ... which of these characters would you want to be and they all wanted to be Garrett, they all wanted to be the guy that does the crazy things. They all wanted to be the guy that was the leader, and they all saw him as the leader of this group [even though he was not]."
- Egon Spengler (voiced by Maurice LaMarche) – The series' only original Ghostbuster, Egon mentors the new Ghostbusters team. He still lives in the firehouse with Slimer, enabling the building to become the Ghostbusters headquarters when paranormal activity resumes. Before the first ghost escaped, Egon taught classes on the paranormal at New York City College; four people took his class, double the usual number. He usually leaves field work to the new members (providing audio backup from the firehouse and information on their current adversary), but joins them when he feels that a crisis requires his presence. Egon is also interested in mold, and grows cultures in Eduardo's bathtub when they room together. His romantic tension with Janine continues.
- Janine Melnitz (voiced by Pat Musick) – The Ghostbusters' original receptionist is reunited with Egon in his Paranormal 101 class at New York City College. Like Egon, she supervises the new team and occasionally contributes to ghostbusting. Egon calls her the team's accountant and collector, and her attraction to him remains unrequited: "She's spent the last decade flitting from job to job ... trying not to pine for Prof. Spengler".

== Production ==
Showrunner Bob Higgins told Ability that the decision to create a new Ghostbusters was made by the studio, which hoped to reinvigorate a lucrative franchise. Originally announced as Super Ghostbusters in 1996, its initial press release had Janine teaching history at a local college and bringing together a team with "a hip new attitude" to face a plague of ghosts; "Short on time and more than a little desperate, Janine turns to four of her teenaged students." Egon was "huddled in front of a computer screen, battling program bugs instead of spooks."

The show's creators decided "to put together a team of misfits in a way, people that you would not necessarily associate with being superheroes on television"; Eduardo is a slacker, Roland is a "square," and Kylie is moody and sarcastic. Garrett provides balance, "an adrenaline junkie, who could kind of kick start the team." Designer Fil Barlow was given rough outlines and originally designed all the characters except Eduardo as girls (Garrett as Lucy and Roland as Julia), with Egon originally bearded and robed. Barlow imagined Egon as "an ambassador to the ghost realm trying to stop an impending war on the other side."

During production, Lucy/Garrett was bland until producer Jeff Kline suggested putting the character in a wheelchair; Higgins said that this made Garrett more interesting to write, as he was now "one of these guys that takes what he is given and makes the best of it and lives up to any potential that he has." When the character was Lucy, she was given proton-blasting calipers and crutches. Producer Richard Raynis requested a wheelchair instead; although Barlow attempted to show that a female character could "be fearless and gung ho," Raynis requested the gender change. The series received an award from the Los Angeles Commission on Disabilities for its depiction of Garrett.

Other elements were changed during production: Egon replaced Janine as the teacher, Slimer lost a goblin sidekick called Gnat, and Garrett was originally Lucas. Roland was originally a clumsy "gentle giant," and Eduardo dreamed of running in the Olympics. "Lucas" had a hair-trigger temper. The team which helmed Extreme Ghostbusters consisted of a number of producers and writers who had worked on The Real Ghostbusters (including Raynis), and the series was a sequel of the earlier show. It was one of the few sequels of a 1980s cartoon series; Masters of the Universe and Teenage Mutant Ninja Turtles opted for series relaunches, but Extreme Ghostbusters opted for a more realistic passage of time. Maurice LaMarche was brought back to voice Egon Spengler, but Frank Welker and Laura Summer did not return as Slimer and Janine. The series had more explicit tie-ins to The Real Ghostbusters as it continued. "Slimer's Sacrifice" referenced Egon entering the containment unit in the Real Ghostbusters episode "Xmas Marks the Spot"; "Grundelesque" is a sequel of the Real Ghostbusters episode "The Grundel," bringing back the villain and revealing that Kylie lost a friend during its first attack. "Back in the Saddle," the two-part finale, featured the remaining original Ghostbusters joining their successors; Dave Coulier (the second voice of Peter Venkman), Buster Jones (the second voice of Winston Zeddemore), and Frank Welker (the voice of Ray Stantz) reprised their roles.

== Episodes ==
No.	Title	Directed by	Written by	Original release date
1	"Darkness at Noon, Part 1"	Rafael Rosado	Billy Brown, Dan Angel & Dean Stefan	September 1, 1997
Part one of two. Several years after The Real Ghostbusters ended, there is a lull in supernatural activity in New York City and the team has gone their separate ways. In 1997, during excavation of a new subway, three construction workers find skeletons and antiquities in a tunnel. As they discuss what to do, a green vapor seeps out and a multi-armed ghost appears. At New York City College, former Ghostbuster Egon Spengler is teaching a class on the paranormal. His students include Garrett Miller, a young paraplegic athlete; Kylie Griffin, a genius and expert on the occult; Eduardo Rivera, a cynical Latino slacker; and Roland, a mechanical whiz. Janine Melnitz is also in attendance. After she was downsized, Janine continued her education. She and Egon catch up, and Egon says that he still lives in the old firehouse. When the ghost Achira appears in the city and declares that the 11th prophecy will be fulfilled, Egon drafts his students to help him stop this; Achira possesses Kylie.
2	"Darkness at Noon, Part 2"	Rafael Rosado	Billy Brown, Dan Angel & Dean Stefan	September 2, 1997
Conclusion. With Achira spreading disease through the possessed Kylie, the infected Egon helps train and equip the recruits for battle. In Part 1 and most of Part 2, the XGB uses the original equipment in The Real Ghostbusters. In this episode, Egon and the team design and build new equipment.
3	"The True Face of a Monster"	Rafael Rosado	Bob Skir & Marty Isenberg	September 3, 1997
A rabbi's son brings to life a golem to protect his father's synagogue from anti-Semitic vandalism. Meanwhile, Garrett reunites with his old friends from Brooklyn Heights, who also turn out to be a different type of monster.
4	"Fear Itself"	Audu Paden	Duane Capizzi	September 4, 1997
The XGBs investigate strange occurrences in a recently-renovated hotel, and face a creature which brings to life an intruder's innermost fears.
5	"Deadliners"	Scott Wood	Duane Capizzi	September 5, 1997
The XGBs investigate a string of disappearances in the outskirts of town that may be connected to a children's horror novelist named J.N. Kline that also went missing.
6	"Casting the Runes"	Vic Dal Chele	John Semper	September 8, 1997
A petty thief steals a pouch of runes from the Metropolitan Museum of Art, and uses its power to take revenge on people who have harassed him.
7	"The Infernal Machine"	Bob Fuentes III	Steve Roberts	September 9, 1997
The XGBs battle Luko, a demon that possesses inventors to create the perfect machine, only to possess the machine and kill the inventor.
8	"Home is Where the Horror Is"	Frank Squillace	Neil Ruttenberg	September 10, 1997
The XGBs investigate a house when two boys go missing...and discover that the house is the ghost.
9	"Killjoys"	Tim Eldred	Alexx Van Dyne	September 11, 1997
The XGBs pursue vampire clowns which devour victims who laugh in their presence. When Eduardo captures one of the clowns, he turns into one himself thanks to a cursed jack-in-the-box.
10	"The Unseen"	Tim Eldred	Siobhan Byrne	September 12, 1997
Kylie and Eduardo are forced to work together when Eduardo loses Kylie's proton pack and everyone from homeless men to two bank robbers get their hands on it and use it for trivial reasons. Meanwhile, the rest of the XGBs and Egon try to stop the city museum from displaying an orb that steals people's eyesight.
11	"The Crawler"	Scott Wood & Gloria Jenkins	Steve Slavkin	September 22, 1997
Fed up with Egon ignoring her, Janine makes him jealous by dating a handsome Hispanic man who turns out to be a bug-like monster in search of a queen.
12	"The Pied Piper of Manhattan"	Rafael Rosado	Steve Cuden	September 23, 1997
The XGBs are useless when Mayor McShane hires a strange man said to be a Pied Piper for ghosts...until the mayor reneges on his deal, and the piper uses his flute to abduct the city's children.
13	"Be Careful What You Wish For"	Bob Fuentes III	Lara Runnels & Patricia Carr	September 24, 1997
A sinister salesman who can fulfill people's deepest desires arrives in New York City. Each of the granted wishes causes more harm than good, however, particularly for Eduardo (who is trapped inside Kylie's cat, Pagan, after wishing that she would respect him more).
14	"Grease"	Gloria Jenkins	Steve Roberts	September 25, 1997
The XGBs combat a mischievous gremlin on a plane, under the watchful eyes of two government agents who think that they are criminals.
15	"The Jersey Devil Made Me Do It"	Tim Eldred	Ernie Altbacker & James Krieg	September 26, 1997
During Spring Break, The XGBs arrive in a town from the Jersey Devil, armed with a metal-dissolving breath, Now without any of their equipment, the team has to try to stop it, or the townsfolk with sacrifice them to the Jersey Devil.
16	"Dry Spell"	Vic Dal Chele	Neil Alsip	September 29, 1997
The XGBs combat a creature which can drain moisture from the human body, and an obsessed oceanographer who wants to capture it.
17	"Sonic Youth"	Bob Fuentes III	Greg Pincus	September 30, 1997
The hunt for a banshee becomes more difficult when its peace-loving sister, a siren, enchants Roland (and New York City's teenagers and assorted disaffected youth) with her voice.
18	"Ghost Apocalyptic Future"	Tim Eldred	Steve Perry	October 1, 1997
A disturbance in the space-time continuum results in Kylie switching places with a rebel fighter from the future, when New York is ruled by the paranormal tyrant Tempus. Tempus is split into two versions, one in each times. The future characters know Kylie, Roland, and Eduardo as legendary heroes of the Great Ghost War, but are unfamiliar with Garrett.
19	"Bird of Prey"	Chris Berkeley	Mark Hoffmeier	October 2, 1997
A huge, bird-like dragon known as the Hraesvelg drastically changes the weather in New York, and the XGBs must stop it before the city is threatened.
20	"Seeds of Destruction"	Sam Liu	Richard Mueller	October 3, 1997
A seed inhabited by a vengeful paranormal entity wreaks havoc when it transforms plants into overgrown monstrosities which can destroy buildings.
21	"The Luck of the Irish"	Frank Squillace	Brooks Wachtel	November 3, 1997
A recently-released leprechaun is on a vendetta to persecute those it believes stole his pot of gold, and curses Garrett.
22	"The Ghostmakers"	Vic Dal Chele	Mark Amato	November 4, 1997
People are reportedly acting strangely, and Eduardo is possessed by a mirror-inhabiting demon which mimics his behavior imperfectly.
23	"Slimer's Sacrifice"	Gloria Jenkins	Adam Gilad	November 5, 1997
Slimer is trapped in the containment unit, and the Ghostbusters are being picked off one by one by the aggressive dog-like monster Fenris. Eduardo decides to save Slimer, leaving the others to stop the demon god Surtr's plot to bring about Ragnarök. Several older monsters appear, including the banshee and the siren (who is forced to obey Surtr).
24	"Grundelesque"	Vic Dal Chele	Martin Olson	November 6, 1997
The Grundel, a ghost the original team caught years ago, appears to be hunting children again. Kylie becomes obsessed with trying to solve this case, as The Grundel may be the same one who kidnapped her childhood friend, Jack.
25	"In Your Dreams"	Chris Dozois	Steven Melching	November 7, 1997
Morpheus, a dream ghost, uses an obnoxious talk-radio DJ named Barry Sherman, to turn people's dreams into living nightmares.
26	"Moby Ghost"	Alan Caldwell	Richard Stanley	November 10, 1997
When Lotan (a whale-like entity) causes electronic chaos across the city, the XGBs must join forces with a spectral hunter to stop it.
27	"Fallout"	Chris Berkeley	Bruce Reid Schaefer	November 12, 1997
The XGBs have to devise a new plan when an entity which feeds on nuclear isotopes is unaffected by their proton packs. Janine leaves town to visit family, including her sister Doris.
28	"Eyes of a Dragon"	Sam Liu	Joseph Kuhr	November 13, 1997
After a local merchant disappears, the XGBs find that people in Chinatown are having their bones stolen.
29	"Till Death Do We Start"	Tim Eldred	Lane Raichert	November 14, 1997
A yuppie buys a large house in the woods which holds a wishing well. He offhandedly make a wish for a wife, and gets more than he bargains for when the well generates a demon in a wedding dress.
30	"Glutton for Punishment"	Gloria Jenkins	Steven Melching	November 24, 1997
New York residents are going into inexplicable feeding frenzies, and the disorder also affects Slimer. The Ghostbusters try to stop him from devouring the firehouse.
31	"Ghost in the Machine"	Bob Fuentes III & Tim Eldred	Steve Cuden	November 25, 1997
When an abandoned oil well is reopened, a spirit escapes and begins possessing vehicles.
32	"Dog Days"	Chris Dozois	Barry Hawkins	November 26, 1997
The XGBs combat canine problems when a demonic dog enslaves the city's dogs.
33	"Mole People"	Vic Dal Chele	Reed Moran	November 27, 1997
A string of power outages is blamed on a group of underground people, but the XGBs discover that a quartet of energy-based ghosts are the culprits.
34	"A Temporary Insanity"	Tim Eldred	Richard Mueller	November 28, 1997
When Janine goes on vacation, the XGBs hire a temp named Lillith (voiced by Nora Dunn) who is not all she seems to be.
35	"Rage"	Frank Squillace	Thomas Pugsley & Greg Klein	December 1, 1997
When the firehouse is fumigated, Egon moves in with Eduardo. A troll is loose in the city and Eduardo's brother, who despises him for being a Ghostbuster, responds with the NYPD.
36	"Heart of Darkness"	Gloria Jenkins	Neil Ruttenberg	December 2, 1997
A spate of thefts of electrical equipment and a set of priceless crystal skulls bring Egon into contact with an old associate (voiced by John de Lancie).
37	"Back in the Saddle, Part 1"	Tim Eldred	Gary Stuart Kaplan & Larry Swerdlove	December 3, 1997
Part one of two. Janine arranges a unique present for Egon's 40th birthday: a reunion with his old colleagues Peter Venkman, Ray Stantz and Winston Zeddemore from their days on The Real Ghostbusters. The surprise is spoiled, however, by friction between the old and new Ghostbusters.
38	"Back in the Saddle, Part 2"	Chris Berkeley	Brooks Wachtel	December 4, 1997
Conclusion. The Real and Extreme Ghostbusters set aside their differences when a mysterious entity devours people, boats, and towns along the Eastern American Seaboard. The Ghostbusters discover that it is heading for Manhattan from the Bermuda Triangle.
39	"The Sphinx"	Bob Fuentes III & Tim Eldred	Steve Roberts	December 5, 1997
A sphinx is turning Manhattan's intellectuals into idiots as punishment for not solving his riddle. Egon, concerned about getting old, begins to impose himself on the Ghostbusters' fieldwork. NOTE: This episode was written before the "Back in the Saddle" two-part finale, though some episode listings (such as this one) broadcast it as the penultimate episode.
40	"Witchy Woman"	Alan Caldwell	Robin Bernheim	December 8, 1997
Three college-aged witches try to recruit Kylie into their coven to evoke a spirit which will give them more power. When Kylie refuses, they recruit the oblivious (and infatuated) Eduardo.

== Broadcast ==
The series initially aired on the syndicated Bohbot Kids Network (BKN) in 1997, and was aired on ABS-CBN in the Philippines two years later. It aired in the Republic of Ireland on RTE Two from 19 February 1998 to 1999. The channel broadcast a short rerun in the summer of 2007. In 2021, for the upcoming release of Ghostbusters: Afterlife, episodes of The Real Ghostbusters and Extreme Ghostbusters were posted on the Ghostbusters YouTube channel.

== Home media ==
=== United States ===
In 1999, Columbia TriStar Home Video released three VHS volumes of the show. The videotapes were available to purchase separately or as a boxed set of all three volumes. The first featured the "Darkness at Noon" two-parter, the second featured "The Infernal Machine" and "Grundelesque", and the third featured the "Back in the Saddle" two-parter.

On March 19, 2024, Sony Pictures Home Entertainment released the complete series as a 9-disc DVD set.

=== Internationally ===
On June 2, 2009, Sony Pictures Home Entertainment released a two-disc DVD set containing the first thirteen episodes of the series. The release features English, French, German, and Spanish audio. The same DVD was released throughout Europe (United Kingdom, France, Spain, Germany, Italy and the Netherlands) during the rest of the month. The UK release was released by UCA, a joint-venture between Universal Pictures Video and Sony Pictures Home Entertainment.

The first disc was re-released in a three-pack by UCA on September 27, 2010 which also included Alvin and the Chipmunks Meet the Wolfman and the first volume of Casper's Scare School. The volume was re-released again by Sony Pictures Home Entertainment on June 27, 2016 with new packaging to coinside with the release of the 2016 film.

=== Streaming ===
In February 2021, the episodes were uploaded weekly to the Ghostbusters YouTube channel in high definition.

All episodes of the series are currently available for streaming online on The Roku Channel and Tubi.

It was formerly available on Hulu and Netflix in the United States and CTV Television Network's former streaming service CTV Throwback (now replaced by Crave in 2026) in Canada.

== Reception and legacy ==
In a series retrospective, SFX said that the "consensus that any extension of the Ghostbusters brand requires a whole new team of newbies to take on the mantle", and that Extreme Ghostbusters was its first application. The series' failure, blamed by its showrunners on poor American scheduling and the decline of non-educational children's syndication in favor of networks such as Fox Kids and Kids' WB and cable channels (although some American stations carried the series in the 3:00–5:00 pm after-school slot), was seen by SFX as demonstrating that "the appeal of Ghostbusters was only partially the concept, and that it's the characters we love above all must be a sobering thought for anyone charged with rebooting Ghostbusters again." The series was also noted for aiming at "a slightly more adolescent audience with a tougher edge," "clearly intended to test the boundaries of child-friendly horror." The Eduardo/Kylie relationship pushed the edge of the ratings.

== Merchandise and other media ==
The series generated a line of action figures manufactured by Trendmasters. The line included Roland, Eduardo, Kylie, several ghosts, and updated versions of Egon Spengler and the Ecto-1; Garrett did not have a figure, although collectors have found a prototype figure that went unreleased. Deluxe versions of the four Ghostbusters figures were also released, featuring electronic light and sound. A role-playing proton pack & plasma blaster, standalone plasma blaster, and ghost trap with positron blaster were released alongside the action figures.

=== Website ===
The original website included a Flash tour of the firehouse, character profiles, descriptions of ghosts fought, and a Flash game. "Spengler's Spirit Guide" contained journal entries by "Egon" about haunted areas and the how-to of ghostbusting. Two entries, "The Bermuda Triangle" and "The Jersey Devil", appeared in episodes.

=== Video games ===
Three video games based on the series were created: Extreme Ghostbusters for the Game Boy Color, Extreme Ghostbusters: Code Ecto-1 for Game Boy Advance, and Extreme Ghostbusters: The Ultimate Invasion for the PlayStation. There are two PC games: Extreme Ghostbusters: Zap The Ghosts! and Extreme Ghostbusters Creativity Centre.
