= George Hall (cartoonist) =

Australian comic book artist and writer (born 1960)

- Born: 1960 (age 65–66); Bairnsdale, Victoria, Australia
- Occupations: Comic book writer and artist

George Hall (born 1960) is an Australian comic book writer and artist who was prominent during the 1980s. He drew two separate strips for the mid-eighties anthology comic Reverie, alongside creators Paul Harris, Peter Hughes, Robert Shaw, Fil Barlow, Michael Dutkiewicz and Ian C. Thomas.

Hall was born in Bairnsdale, Victoria. He was with Reverie for its entire seven-issue run, and created Sandy Star: Rebel Force (Reverie 1–3), a sci-fi strip, and Bloodgard (Reverie 4–7), a dark superhero concept.

== The Reverie years ==
Reverie was the brainchild of Gary Dellar, who envisaged an anthology title similar to British weekly comics, although with a semi-regular schedule. Gary Dellar also had the help of Paul Harris, whose experience in advertising contributed to production values. The comic was available through newsagents between 1983 and 1986. The average early print run was 2500 and later with a slow but steady growth in sales, hit the incredible amount [issue seven] of 9,000. The cost in financing a comic privately and have it distributed through Gordon & Gotch was enormous. Gary Dellar in his attempt to save on costs purchased a printing press and started printing the comic himself. The covers having been out sourced.

Widely distributed through newsagents with an agreement that the comic would have a shelve life of two months, it made the return sales somewhat of a terminal effect on the future of the comic. The biggest issue, being the last issue, had taken a mere 5 months to tell if it had been a success. It was. Selling two thirds of the print run and making a profit. Unfortunately by the time this information came to the surface, the printing press was sold and the comic was no more. There were at least 15 new artists on board and ready to publish. The major inroads with the future design and direction with issue eight onwards was to be enormous.

With seven issues, it filled an important role at the time, giving new creators a chance to develop their skills and established artists a new platform for their talents. During the course of its run, other artists came on board, some of whom went on to work in the mainstream American comics. Most notable is Michal Dutkiewicz, who went on to work for DC Comics, and Fil Barlow, creator of Zooniverse.

Hall joined Reverie in the months before its first issue, proposing a strip he had first devised during his last year of high school. His first episode was co-plotted by his then-wife, Zora Marko. His second Sandy Star episode also featured background art by Dellar. In the latter part of the Reverie run, he concentrated more on writing, allowing a talented teen-aged artist, Mark Ryan, an opportunity.

== From Sandy Star to Bloodgard ==
George was self-taught, but worked to master the learning curve of published work. He experimented with various techniques during his first three episodes, such as having a background artist in Sandy Star's second episode, while tackling duotones in the third. He even welcomed a different artistic interpretation of Bloodgard after its initial episode. On the writing side of things, his Bloodgard episodes utilized different characters' perspectives for each chapter (Bloodgard third and fourth episodes). Generally, Bloodgard is the better written of his two strips.

The Australian fan press reaction to his work was more favorable to Bloodgard than to Sandy Star: Rebel Force.

In Reverie 3, he introduced an early version of Bloodgard as a secondary character, to assist the plot, then switched entirely over to Bloodgard in Reverie 4, with Sandy Star's last appearance being to introduce Bloodgard's origin and ensure a smooth transition to the new strip.

Bloodgard was a chilling concept. The first two episodes started off as typical superhero fare, only to twist by the end of the second episode, where Bloodgard destroyed the two major global superpowers of his timeline and took over his world. Episodes three and four dealt with the first story arc, where he drew four non-powered versions of himself from other timelines in a bid to destroy them. Had Reverie continued publishing past issue 7, the arc would have ended with one of the four alternate timeline duplicates donning a different set of Bloodgard armour to become the new Bloodgard and take the series further.

The strip anticipated trends in comics that would crop up in the mainstream American ones a few years afterward.

The second episode of Bloodgard featured the art of fourteen-year-old Mark Ryan, who stayed on the strip through to Reverie 7. George continued as writer.

== Recent endeavours ==
Hall wrote a novel called A Question of Theories and explored publishing it via print-on-demand publishing. He has also written a screenplay of the same name.

The novel is a non-superhero work, a satire on American movies of the nineties. In 2012, it became available as an ebook both on Apple iBooks and Barnes-and-Noble.

He continued working on the Bloodgard concept over the years, renaming it to Terrorgard and has recently started writing a prose version, updating it from its original 1980s milieu.

In February, 2009, George Hall was a Twitter volunteer during the Victorian Black Saturday bushfires, relaying important emergency tweets as @geehall1. He again fulfilled this role during other emergencies, including 2010-2011 Queensland Floods and Victorian floods, receiving recognition for this in a number of Australian studies into the use of social media in emergencies.

== Sources ==
- Tabula Rasa article on 1980s Australian comic scene.
