= George Hall (Australian footballer) =

Australian rules footballer

Personal information
- Full name: George Albert Hall
- Born: 16 April 1880; Rutherglen, Victoria
- Died: 22 August 1954 (aged 74); Corowa, New South Wales
- Original team: Yarrawonga

Playing career^{1}
Years	Club	Games (Goals)
1903	St Kilda	4 (2)
- ^{1} Playing statistics correct to the end of 1903.

George Albert Hall (16 April 1880 – 22 August 1954) was an Australian rules footballer who played with St Kilda in the Victorian Football League (VFL).
