= George Lothian Hall =

British painter

- Born: 2 April 1825
- Died: 23 July 1888 (aged 63); Wales

George Lothian Hall (2 April 1825 – 23 July 1888) was known as a watercolour artist. He has paintings in the Yale Center for British Art including many of Gibraltar.

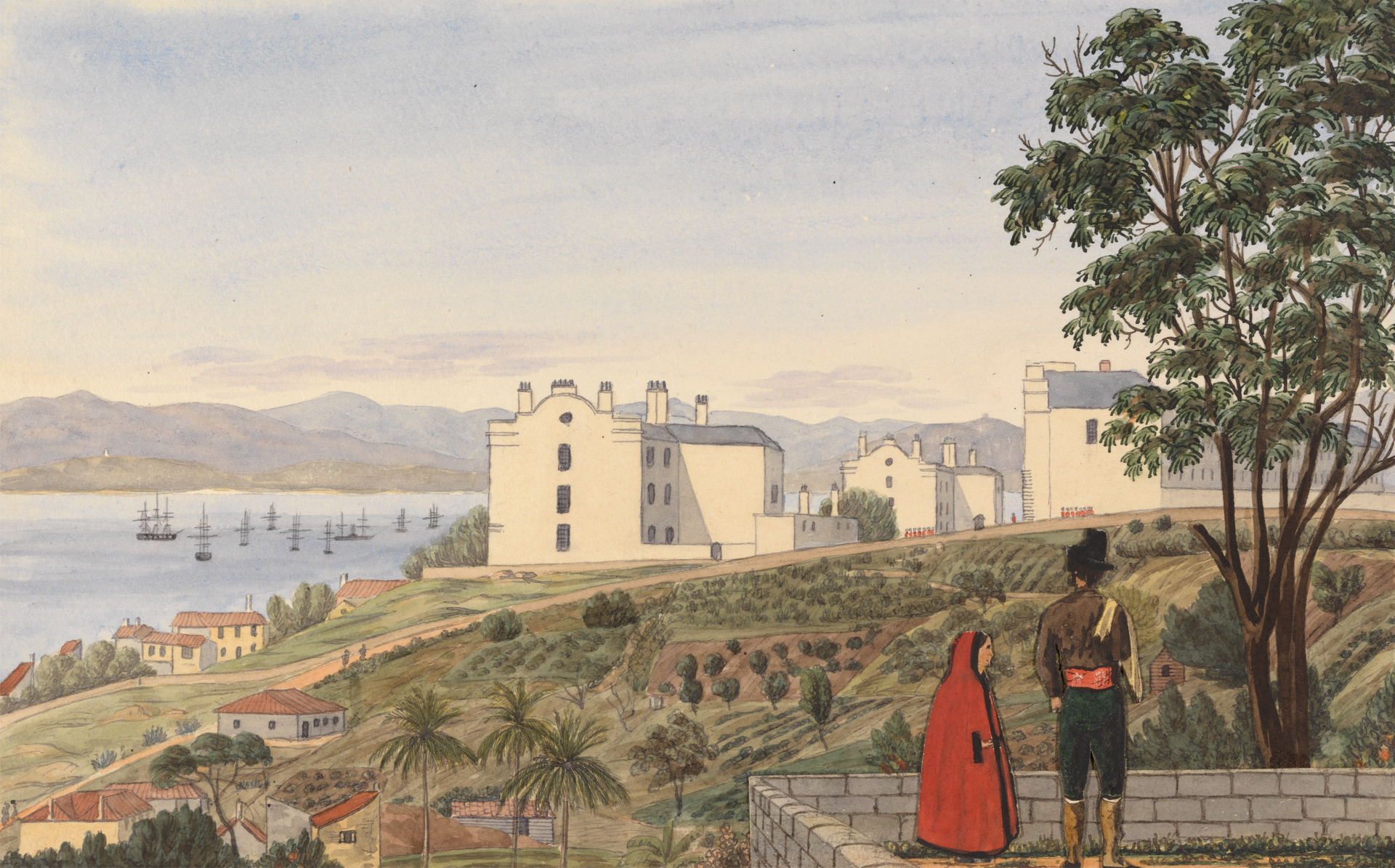
South Barracks, Gibraltar

== Life ==
He was the son of John Hall of Liverpool and Mollance Castle, Kirkcudbrightshire. He was educated at Rugby and Brasenose College, Oxford. In 1848-54 he traveled in Brazil. He began to paint on his return to London, where he exhibited 1856-78, especially at the Dudley Gallery. He exhibited fifteen paintings during that period, seven at the Royal Academy and eight with the Royal Society of British Artists at their Suffolk Street gallery. Hall retired to Wales in 1880, died there on 23 July 1888, and was buried in Llanfair P.G. Island Churchyard in the Menai Straits.
