= The Hero of Color City =

2014 American-Indian film

- Theatrical release poster
- Directed by: Frank Gladstone
- Screenplay by: Jess Kedward; J.P. McCormick; Kirsty Peart; Rich Raczelowski
- Produced by: John D. Eraklis; Max Howard
- Starring: Christina Ricci; Sean Astin; Owen Wilson; E.G. Daily; Jessica Capshaw; Rosie Perez; Tara Strong; Craig Ferguson; Wayne Brady; Jess Harnell; David Kaye
- Edited by: Josh Gladstone
- Music by: Zoë Poledouris; Angel Roché Jr.
- Production companies: Exodus Film Group; Toonz Entertainment
- Distributed by: Xing Xing Digital (international sales); Magnolia Pictures (United States)
- Release date: October 3, 2014
- Running time: 77 minutes
- Countries: United States; India
- Language: English
- Box office: $32,048

The Hero of Color City (also known as The Hero of Colour City in the UK) is a 2014 American animated musical adventure comedy film directed by Frank Gladstone. The film stars the voices of Christina Ricci, Sean Astin, Owen Wilson, E.G. Daily, Jessica Capshaw, Rosie Perez, Craig Ferguson, Wayne Brady, Jess Harnell, and David Kaye. Original songs and the score were written by Zoë Poledouris and Angel Roché Jr. The film follows Yellow, a yellow crayon and her gang of other crayons who find themselves living in a crayon box to save the crayons from two unfinished drawings from their owner who have blocked up their color source.

The Hero of Color City was released in a limited theatrical engagement on October 3, 2014, followed by releases on streaming and video platforms.

The film received generally negative reviews from critics.

== Plot ==
The creative boy Ben is drawing two new characters known as King Scrawl and Gnat. As he is drawing at night, his mom tells him to go to sleep, leaving the drawings uncolored as a result. When he's asleep, his crayons apparently come to life and use their crayon box to enter the magical Color City. One of the crayons, Yellow, is accidentally left behind and enters late. While getting in, she accidentally attracts the uncolored two.

In Color City, she meets up with her friends, Red, Green, Blue, Black, and White and they head to Madame Pink's Spa to repair. After finishing her tip treatment, Yellow makes her way to the Lighthouse for a beach party prepared by her friends. However, she is kidnapped by an angry King Scrawl, but Brown, Sheriff of Color City, frees her. A dejected Scrawl and Gnat choose instead to bounce to the top of the Rainbow Colorfall, the source of the crayons' color. There, they submerge themselves in the flow before it instantly drains out, so they decide to block up the Colorfall with nearby boulders.

Brown and Professor Heliotrops hold a city meeting on Scrawl's potential threat: if the scribbles were to block or even destroy the Colorfall, the crayons would fade away until they became grey and transparent then cease to exist. Yellow's friend group volunteers to stop King Scrawl and save the day. While said group prepares for their voyage to the Colorfall, Yellow accidentally sets the ship they would sail on off while bringing in supplies. At a fork, the obsessive Green is put in charge of guiding the ship, only to immediately crash it. It's where they reach land from the shipwreck that they and the rest of the crayons back at Color City begin to lose color.

In a misty desert, White, camouflaging in the fog, examines more unfinished drawings the others have mistaken for monsters across. The drawings guide the team out the mist, and they are finally colored in for their reward. Further in the team's journey, King Scrawl saves Yellow from the Trashasaur, the drawing-eating Dinosaur, to which Yellow understands King Scrawl and Gnat wanting color. After negotiating with the rest of the nearly-faded team, Yellow and the rest helps them try to pull out the boulders alongside the drawings they colored. They succeed at breaking the dam and releasing the Colorfall, reviving themselves and Color City. Returning to a ceremony at the town with King Scrawl and Gnat now colored, the team is thanked for their bravery and Yellow is awarded by Brown and Heliotrope the honorary Medal of the Hero of Color City.

The crayons return to reality where their owner Ben wakes up to see his once-unfinished drawings colored in. The drawings stuck up on his wall, and on a new day, Yellow and King Scrawl share a wink.

== Cast ==
- Christina Ricci as Yellow, a timid yellow crayon who likes to sing
  - Tara Strong as Yellow's singing voice
- Rosie Perez as Red, a sarcastic and sassy red crayon and one of Yellow's friends
- Jess Harnell as Green, a nerdy and organized green crayon and one of Yellow's friends
- Wayne Brady as Blue, an easy-going blue crayon and one of Yellow's friends
- Jeremy Guskin as:
  - White, an unused white crayon unable to get into Madame Pink's beauty salon and one of Yellow's friends
  - Professor Heliotrope, a lilac crayon scientist
  - Grey, an elderly light-gray crayon
  - Orange
- David Kaye as:
  - Black, a gloomy and unfazed black crayon and one of Yellow's friends
  - King Scrawl, an unfinished drawing who wears king's robes and is friends with Gnat
- Craig Ferguson as Gnat, an insect-like unfinished drawing who is King Scrawl's advisor
- Tom Lowell as Sheriff Brown, a tannish-brown crayon resembling a cowboy with his wear and traits, acting as the sheriff of Color City
- Zoë Bright as Madame Pink, a French-accented pink crayon who owns a beauty salon for crayons to repair after use
  - Bright also voices the Opera Singer
- Sophia Eraklis as Purple
- Robin Howard as:
  - Aquamarine, one of the Sheriff's two official guardsmen
  - Tangerine
  - Periwinkle
- John D. Eraklis as Navy Blue, the Sheriff's other official guardsman
- Frank Gladstone as:
  - Refried Bean, a gassy reddish-brown crayon
  - Astronaut, an unfinished astronaut drawing
- E.G. Daily as:
  - Ben, an imaginative 6-year-old boy and the owner of the Color City Crayons and drawings
  - Ben's mother
  - Tutti Frutti, a purplish-magenta crayon able to change her colors unlike anyone else
  - Neon Lime, a observant and jumpy crayon
- Owen Wilson as Ricky, an uncolored dragon drawing who acts as a leader for the other unfinished drawings
- Jessica Capshaw as Duck, an uncolored drawing who is Ricky's assistant
- Sean Astin as an uncolored drawing of Horatio the Bee, the mascot of Bumble Bee Foods
- Laura Lane as Horse, an unfinished drawing
- Josh Gladstone as Cow, another unfinished drawing

== Release ==
The Hero of Color City had a limited release, as well on iTunes and on demand on October 3, 2014. The film was released on DVD and Blu-ray on December 2, 2014.

== Reception ==
On Rotten Tomatoes, the film received a rating of 30%, based on 21 reviews, with an average rating of 4.40/10. On Metacritic, the film has a rating of 33 out of 100, based on 12 critics, indicating "generally unfavorable reviews".
