= George Hall (footballer, born 1912) =

English footballer

Personal information
- Date of birth: 5 September 1912
- Place of birth: Worksop, England
- Date of death: 1989 (aged 76–77)
- Position: Wing half

Senior career*
Years	Team	Apps	(Gls)
1928	Kiveton Park		
1931	Worksop Town		
1932–1935	Sheffield United	22	(0)
1936–1937	Newport County	28	(0)
1937–1939	Bristol City	13	(0)

Managerial career
- 1946–1947: Scarborough
- 1948–1949: Sparta Rotterdam
- * Club domestic league appearances and goals

George Hall (1912–1989) was an English professional footballer who played over 60 games in the Football League for the likes of Sheffield United and Newport County.

Hall managed Dutch side Sparta Rotterdam between 1948 and 1949.
