= Fil Barlow =

Australian cartoonist and designer

- Born: 8 April 1963 (age 63); Adelaide, Australia
- Occupations: Character designer, cartoonist
- Known for: Zooniverse

Fil Barlow (born 8 April 1963) is an Australian artist, cartoonist, writer, production designer currently based in Los Angeles. Barlow is the creator of the Zooniverse comic book published in 1986-87.

== Biography ==
Barlow was born on 8 April 1963 in Adelaide, South Australia. In 1965, his family moved to Balwyn North, Victoria. He pursued drawing at an early age, self publishing his first comic book, Fudsey, at age of 10, and the next year had his comic Zeroy serialized over four weeks in a Sunday paper called The Observer. Barlow began his professional cartooning career with Australian Scout Magazine at the age of sixteen, two years later he became a regular contributor to Melbourne based Inkspots Magazine. Minotaur Books proprietor, Colin Paraskevas, published Barlow's Zooniverse comic internationally in a joint venture with Eclipse Comics between 1986 and 1987.

Richard Raynis, then producer at DIC offered Barlow the character design supervisor position on ALF, which he worked on from 1987 to 1989. Barlow returned to Australia, moving to the Gold Coast, Queensland in 1992 creating the comic Rex Vectar, which was serialized in Megazone Magazine in 1992 and ran until 1994, he also established his own publishing and animation production house, Zoonimedia. In mid-1994, he moved to Brisbane, with Helen Maier one of the artists associated with Kinetic Comics. In 1996, Barlow returned to Los Angeles with Maier, establishing an animation production house, Artopia. Through his company Barlow has worked as a character design supervisor and lead character designer at Columbia TriStar Television, working on Extreme Ghostbusters, Godzilla: The Series, the 3D series Starship Troopers: Roughneck Chronicles, Max Steel, Heavy Gear and Adam Sandler's feature Eight Crazy Nights.

From 2001 onwards, Barlow has worked independently as character and production designer on Tutenstein, Igor and the co-creation with Helen Maier of the game Spectrobes for Disney.

In 2010, Barlow returned to Melbourne Australia to focus solely on Zooniverse. Barlow began submitting Zoon related animations each month to the web site Loop De Loop, and established a new company Zoonitoons with Maier and in 2012, they began republishing his Zooniverse and Rex Vectar comics. In 2014, the couple began collaborating on 8House: Yorris for Image Comics.

== Credits ==
- Spectrobes (2007) (creator with Helen Maier)
- Igor (2008) (character/production designer)
- Tutenstein (2003–08) (character/production designer)
- Eight Crazy Nights (2002) (character designer)
- Max Steel (2000–02) (creature & character designer)
- Starship Troopers: Roughneck Chronicles (1999-2000) (creature & character designer)
- Godzilla: The Series (1998-2000) (creature & character designer)
- Extreme Ghostbusters (1997) (creature & character designer)
- COPS (1988) (character designer)
- ALF: The Animated Series (1987–89) (production designer)
- Zooniverse (1986–87) (artist, writer, creator)
